= Digital eMation =

South Korean animation studio

Digital eMation, Inc.
- Native name: 디지탈이메이션(주)
- Industry: Animation
- Founded: 1993; 33 years ago
- Headquarters: Seoul, South Korea
- Website: www.emation.co.kr

Digital eMation, Inc. (Korean: 디지탈이메이션(주)) is a South Korean animation studio located in Seoul, South Korea, and founded in 1993. They specialize in traditional animation and digital animation.

== Works ==
Show	Year(s)	Client	Notes
Time Squad	2001	Cartoon Network Studios	season 1 only
Super Duper Sumos	2002–2003	DIC Entertainment, L.P. Ameko Entertainment	
Evil Con Carne	2003–2004	Cartoon Network Studios	
Xiaolin Showdown	2003–2006	Warner Bros. Animation	23 episodes
Martin Mystery	2003–2006	Marathon Animation; Image Entertainment Corporation; Merchandising Media GmbH (seasons 1–2)	
The Grim Adventures of Billy & Mandy	2004–2008	Cartoon Network Studios	Seasons 3–6
The Venture Bros.	2004–2018	Williams Street; Titmouse, Inc.	
The Animated Alias: Tribunal	2004	Bad Robot; Touchstone Television	
Totally Spies!	2004–2008; 2013	Zodiak Kids & Family France; Image Entertainment Corporation (seasons 3–5)	
Megas XLR	2005	Cartoon Network Studios	Season 2 only
Robotboy	2005–2008	Alphanim; LuxAnimation (season 1); Cofinova 1 (season 1)	
Johnny Test	2005–2006	Warner Bros. Animation	season 1 alongside Studio B Productions and Top Draw Animation
Shaggy & Scooby-Doo Get a Clue!	2006–2008	Warner Bros. Animation	14 episodes
Team Galaxy	2006–2008	Marathon Media Group; Image Entertainment Corporation; Rai Fiction	
Famous 5: On the Case	2008	Marathon Media Group; Chorion	
Family Guy	2008–present	20th Television Animation; Fuzzy Door Productions	Season 6 onward
Oggy and the Cockroaches	2008	Xilam Animation	Season 3 only
Batman: The Brave and the Bold	2008–2011	Warner Bros. Animation	
Gormiti: The Lords of Nature Return!	2008	Marathon Media Group; Giochi Preziosi Group	
Seth MacFarlane's Cavalcade of Cartoon Comedy	2008–2010	Fuzzy Door Productions; Main Street Pictures; Media Rights Capital; YouTube Studio	
The Secret Saturdays	2008–2010	PorchLight Entertainment	
The Amazing Spiez!	2009–2012	Marathon Media Group; Image Entertainment Corporation	
The Cleveland Show	2009–2013	20th Television Animation; Fuzzy Door Productions	
Superjail!	2011–2015	Williams Street; Titmouse, Inc.	Seasons 2–4, alongside Titmouse, Inc.
The LeBrons	2011–2014	Believe Entertainment	
Scooby-Doo! Mystery Incorporated	2012–2013	Warner Bros. Animation	Season 2 only
Gravity Falls	2012–2013	Disney Television Animation	nine season 1 episodes
Over the Garden Wall	2014	Cartoon Network Studios	
Be Cool, Scooby-Doo!	2015–2018	Warner Bros. Animation	
Dawn of the Croods	2015–2017	DreamWorks Animation Television	
Mixels	2015	Cartoon Network Studios	1 episode; "Quest for the Lost Mixamajig"
Samurai Jack	2017	Cartoon Network Studios	Season 5 alongside Rough Draft Korea
Stretch Armstrong and the Flex Fighters	2017–2018	Hasbro Studios	
Miraculous Zag Chibi	2018–2024	Zagtoon	
Young Justice: Outsiders	2019	DC Entertainment; Warner Bros. Animation	
Scooby-Doo and Guess Who?	2019–2020	Warner Bros. Animation	Season 1 only
Bless the Harts	2019–2021	Jessebean, Inc. Lord Miller Productions; Fox Entertainment; 20th Television	Alongside Titmouse, Inc. and Yearim
Disenchantment	2021–2023	Netflix; The ULULU Company	Seasons 2 and 3 alongside Rough Draft Korea
Animaniacs	2021–2023	Warner Bros. Animation; Amblin Television	Seasons 2 and 3 alongside Titmouse, Inc., Saerom Animation, Tiger Animation and Yowza! Animation
Harriet the Spy	2021–2024	The Jim Henson Company	
Nickelodeon Intergalactic Shorts Program	2022	Nickelodeon Animation Studio	"Wylde Pak"
Bugs Bunny Builders	2022–2025	Warner Bros. Animation	Alongside Snipple Animation Studios
Futurama	2023–present	20th Television Animation (Note: Credited as 30th Television Animation); The Curiosity Company	even-numbered episodes of Seasons 8 and 9, alongside Rough Draft Korea
Adventure Time: Fionna and Cake	2025	Cartoon Network Studios	Season 2 alongside Saerom Animation

=== Specials ===
Title	Year	Client	Notes
Scooby-Doo! Spooky Games	2012	Warner Bros. Animation	
Scooby-Doo! Haunted Holidays	2012	Warner Bros. Animation	
King Star King	2023	Williams Street	

=== Films ===
Title	Year	Client	Notes
Franklin and the Turtle Lake Treasure	2006	Nelvana	
Billy & Mandy's Big Boogey Adventure	2007	Cartoon Network Studios	
Dante's Inferno: An Animated Epic	2010	Starz Media	"Entry into Hell" segment with Film Roman
Scooby-Doo! Abracadabra-Doo	2010	Warner Bros. Animation	
Scooby-Doo! Camp Scare	2010	Warner Bros. Animation	
Scooby-Doo! Legend of the Phantosaur	2011	Warner Bros. Animation	
Scooby-Doo! Music of the Vampire	2012	Warner Bros. Animation	
Big Top Scooby-Doo!	2012	Warner Bros. Animation	
Scooby-Doo! Mask of the Blue Falcon	2013	Warner Bros. Animation	
Scooby-Doo! Stage Fright	2013	Warner Bros. Animation	
Scooby-Doo! WrestleMania Mystery	2014	Warner Bros. Animation	
Scooby-Doo! Frankencreepy	2014	Warner Bros. Animation	
Scooby-Doo! Moon Monster Madness	2015	Warner Bros. Animation	
Scooby-Doo! and Kiss: Rock and Roll Mystery	2015	Warner Bros. Animation	
Tom and Jerry: Back to Oz	2016	Warner Bros. Animation	
Scooby-Doo! and WWE: Curse of the Speed Demon	2016	Warner Bros. Animation	
Scooby-Doo! Shaggy's Showdown	2017	Warner Bros. Animation	
Tom and Jerry: Willy Wonka and the Chocolate Factory	2017	Warner Bros. Animation	
Scooby-Doo! & Batman: The Brave and the Bold	2018	Warner Bros. Animation	
Scooby-Doo! and the Gourmet Ghost	2018	Warner Bros. Animation	
Scooby-Doo! and the Curse of the 13th Ghost	2019	Warner Bros. Animation	
Scooby-Doo! Return to Zombie Island	2019	Warner Bros. Animation	
Happy Halloween, Scooby-Doo!	2020	Warner Bros. Animation	
Scooby-Doo! The Sword and the Scoob	2021	Warner Bros. Animation	
Straight Outta Nowhere: Scooby-Doo! Meets Courage the Cowardly Dog	2021	Warner Bros. Animation	
Mortal Kombat Legends: Snow Blind	2022	Warner Bros. Animation	
The Venture Bros.: Radiant Is the Blood of the Baboon Heart	2023	Williams Street	

== See also ==
- Rough Draft Korea
- Yearim Productions
- Saerom Animation
- AKOM
- Sunwoo Entertainment
- Anivision
- Grimsaem
