= Charlie Adler =

American voice actor (born 1956)

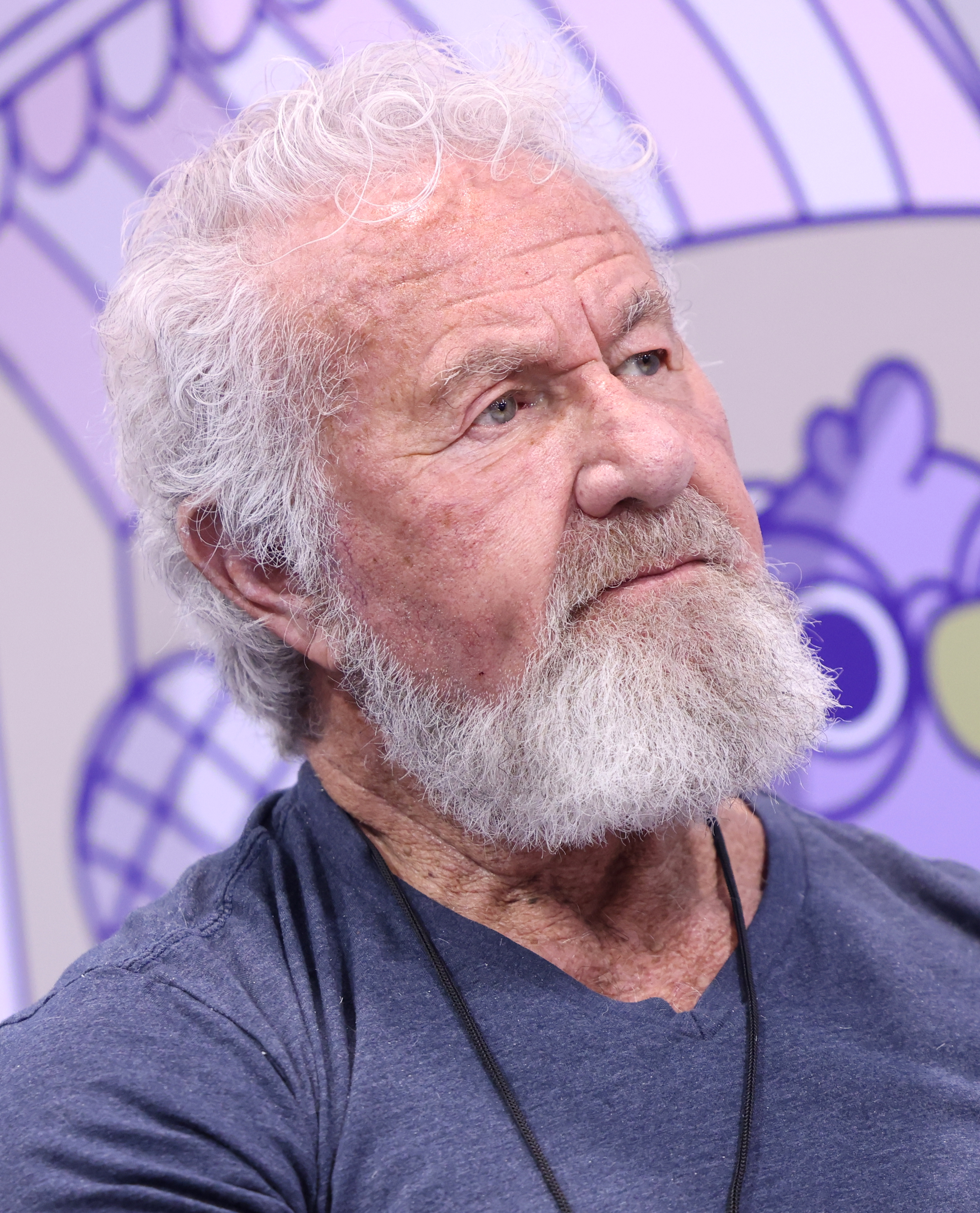
- Adler in 2026
- Born: Charles Michael Adler; October 2, 1956 (age 70); Paterson, New Jersey, U.S.
- Occupations: Voice actor; voice director
- Years active: 1971–present

Charles Michael Adler (born October 2, 1956) is an American voice actor and voice director. He is known for his roles as Buster Bunny on Tiny Toon Adventures, the Bigheads on Rocko's Modern Life and Rocko's Modern Life: Static Cling, Ickis on Aaahh!!! Real Monsters, Doctor Doom, Wrecker, Sabertooth and others in The Super Hero Squad Show, MODOK in various Marvel media, Cobra Commander in GI Joe: Resolute and Renegades, Starscream in the Transformers film series, Mr. Whiskers of Disney's Brandy & Mr. Whiskers, the titular characters of Cartoon Network's Cow and Chicken along with its main antagonist, The Red Guy, Professor Monkey-for-a-Head in Earthworm Jim, I.R. Baboon in I Am Weasel, T-Bone in SWAT Kats: The Radical Squadron, and Tex Hex in Bravestarr.

== Early life ==
Adler grew up in a suburb of New York City. He decided to become an actor in the 5th grade, as his teacher had been an actor. His sister Cheryl Adler is a psychotherapist who wrote the book Sober University. Adler was mentored by Imogene Coca whom he met while performing improv. Growing up, Adler was a self-described "TV junkie", and an avid fan of Rocky and Bullwinkle, The Three Stooges, the Krazy Kat cartoon, and Irene Ryan's Granny Moses from The Beverly Hillbillies.

== Career ==
Adler's first professional acting job was in a commercial in 1971. Afterward, he took a hiatus from acting. During this time, he worked a variety of jobs, including waiter, janitor, paper delivery man, floor stripper, house painter, remedial reading teacher and caretaker for an Episcopal church.

In 1975, Adler was a member of Allan Albert's groundbreaking improv company The Proposition and starred in an Off Broadway production of Once Upon a Mattress with Imogene Coca and Rita Rudner.

In 1984 and 1985, he starred as Arnold Beckoff in Torch Song Trilogy, for which he was nominated for the 1985 Helen Hayes Best Actor Award, in New York City before moving to California in 1986.

Adler's first animation role was recorded in New York City, voicing Spike in Rescue at Midnight Castle.

In 1985, after convincing the head of the Abrams, Rubiloff and Lawrence agency to allow him to audition for their voice-over department, Adler later attended a private audition for Ginny McSwain and Arlene Thornton. An agent had praised him in front of them as the "next Frank Welker". McSwain recalls that "he blew their minds", but Adler claims that initially they had no interest in him. Having no demo, they arranged for him to record an audition. He improvised characters during the tape, which impressed both McSwain and Thornton; however, he was so embarrassed with his performance that he acted with his back to them and his face hidden with a hat and sunglasses. From then on, his voice acting career took off.

Adler landed the roles of Nat Smurfling in the fourth season of The Smurfs, the fictionalized version of "Rowdy" Roddy Piper on Hulk Hogan's Rock 'n' Wrestling, Silverbolt on The Transformers and Eric Raymond, Techrat, and Zipper in Jem.

He was disenchanted with live-action acting after working on The Redd Foxx Show, in which he portrayed Ralph/Rita. In an interview for The Magic Behind the Voices, Adler commented on that experience: "you spend your whole life going, "God, I just want to be in a TV show and have a parking space". Then I got it and it was just so not what I wanted to do."

He became active in animation. His roles included reprising Spike on the My Little Pony TV series, Low-Light on G.I. Joe, Cavey Jr. on The Flintstone Kids, Mr. O'Greasy on A Pup Named Scooby-Doo, Deputy Fuzz and Tex Hex on Bravestarr, Pinky Dalton on The Good, the Bad, and Huckleberry Hound, Quark and Zappy on Rockin' with Judy Jetson, the TurkeyBoy and sometimes Hamburglar in McDonald's commercials and The Wacky Adventures of Ronald McDonald, Mad Dog, Hacksaw, and Howard Huge in TaleSpin, Dripple on Tom & Jerry Kids Show, and the titular character on Paddington Bear.

In 1990, Adler lent his voice to Buster Bunny on Tiny Toon Adventures. Producer Tom Ruegger recalled that he and voice director Andrea Romano insisted Steven Spielberg cast him due to the "great deal of energy" he brought to Buster. In 1992, during the show's third season, he abruptly left the show. John Kassir replaced him for the remainder of Tiny Toons.

In 1993, Adler went on to play Chance "T-Bone" Furlong on SWAT Kats: The Radical Squadron, Bill on The Terrible Thunderlizards, Ickis on Aaahh!!! Real Monsters, Ed and Bev Bighead on Rocko's Modern Life, Stalker Slaughter on Captain Planet and the Planeteers and Screwball Squirrel, as well as reprising Dripple for Droopy, Master Detective.

In 1995, Adler voiced several characters on What a Cartoon!. In the latter, he played Cow, Chicken, and The Red Guy. No Smoking was a pilot created by David Feiss, which was greenlit to be a series in 1997 with him on board to reprise his characters, for a new series, titled I Am Weasel. Cow and Chicken ran from 1997 to 1999, receiving multiple awards and nominations, including an Annie Award for "Outstanding Individual Achievement for Voice Acting in an Animated Television Production" for Adler as Cow. Later on I Am Weasel was made into a spinoff series, in which he reprised the three characters and also voice I.R. Baboon.

His voice directing career began in the late 1990s with Rugrats and later collaborated with Klasky Csupo. Adler has directed The Wild Thornberrys, Rocket Power, All Grown Up!, The Marvelous Misadventures of Flapjack, The Replacements, among others.

In 2002, Adler, with David Feiss and Michael Ryan, directed his own short film No Prom for Cindy.

Adler also voiced Dr. Peacock in Froot Loops commercials, Padrig Winks and Mr. Hornsby on Jakers! The Adventures of Piggley Winks, SAVO on Danger Rangers, Mr. Whiskers on Brandy & Mr. Whiskers, Optimatus on Loonatics Unleashed, and Doctor Doom on The Super Hero Squad Show.

In 2007, Adler provided the voice of Starscream in Michael Bay's live-action Transformers film franchise. Just as Chris Latta voiced both Starscream and Cobra Commander in the Sunbow cartoons, Adler voiced Cobra Commander on G.I. Joe: Resolute and G.I. Joe: Renegades. He also voiced the titular character in the webtoon Inspector Beaver.

Adler was the guest of honor at the 2017 edition of AnthroCon.

He also plays MODOK on Avengers Assemble. His subsequent credits as voice director include: Nickelodeon's Blaze and the Monster Machines, New Looney Tunes (season 1), Kulipari: An Army of Frogs, Kung Fu Panda: The Paws of Destiny, Creature Commandos and Harley Quinn.

== Filmography ==
=== Film ===
List of voice performances in direct-to-video and feature films
Year	Title	Role	Notes
1985	Rainbow Brite and the Star Stealer	Popo	Credited as Charles Adler
1986	My Little Pony: The Movie	Spike, Woodland Creature	
1987	G.I. Joe: The Movie	Low-Light	Direct-to-video
1987	The Chipmunk Adventure	Additional Voices	
1988	BraveStarr: The Movie	Deputy Fuzz, Tex Hex	
1989	Police Academy 6: City Under Siege	The Mastermind	Uncredited
1989	The Little Mermaid	Additional Voices	
1990	Roller Coaster Rabbit	Carnival Barker	Uncredited; Short film
1990	DuckTales the Movie: Treasure of the Lost Lamp	Arab	
1990	The Rescuers Down Under	Additional Voices	
1990	The Prince and the Pauper	Weasel #2 & 3, Pig Driver, Peasant and Man in Street	Short film
1992	Tiny Toon Adventures: How I Spent My Vacation	Buster Bunny	Direct-to-video
1992	Cool World	Nails	Credited as Charles Adler
1992	Aladdin	Gazeem, Melon Merchant, Nut Merchant	
1993	Once Upon a Forest	Waggs	
1998	Rusty: A Dog's Tale	Agent the Snake	Credited as Charles Adler
1998	The Rugrats Movie	United Express Driver	Credited as Charles Adler
2000	Rugrats in Paris: The Movie	Inspector	
2003	Charlotte's Web 2: Wilbur's Great Adventure	Templeton, Lurvy	Direct-to-video
2005	Tom and Jerry: The Fast and the Furry	Grammy	Direct-to-video
2005	Stuart Little 3: Call of the Wild	Beaver	Direct-to-video
2006	Bratz: Genie Magic	Reporter	Direct-to-video
2007	Transformers	Starscream	
2009	Transformers: Revenge of the Fallen	Starscream	
2009	The Haunted World of El Superbeasto	Krongarr	Direct-to-video
2011	Transformers: Dark of the Moon	Starscream	
2011	A Turtle's Tale: Sammy's Adventures		
2013	Khumba	Wild Dog #1, Dassie Leader	Credited as Charles Adler
2015	Top Cat Begins	Granny Dibble	
2016	Norm of the North	Forebear	
2017	All I Want for Christmas Is You	Santa, Mr. Ingersoll, Dougie's Dad	Direct-to-video
2019	Rocko's Modern Life: Static Cling	Ed Bighead, Bev Bighead, others	Netflix film
2024	Hitpig!	Super Rooster	

=== Television ===
List of voice performances in television shows
Year	Title	Role	Notes
1984	My Little Pony	Spike	
1985–89	The Smurfs	Natural "Nat" Smurfling	
1985	The Pound Puppies	Flack	Credited as Charles Adler
1985–86	Hulk Hogan's Rock 'n' Wrestling	"Rowdy" Roddy Piper	Credited as Charles Adler
1985–87	The Transformers	Silverbolt, Triggerhappy, others	
1985–88	Jem	Eric Raymond, Zipper, Tech Rat, Angus (episode "Danse Time"), others	
1986	Smurfquest	Natural "Nat" Smurfling	Television film
1986	The Glo Friends	Excavator, Glo Bug, Dipper Duck	
1986	G.I. Joe: A Real American Hero	Low-Light	
1986	Inhumanoids	George Landisburg	Uncredited
1986–87	My Little Pony 'n Friends	Spike, Woebegone	
1986–88	The Flintstone Kids	Captain Caveman Jr.	
1986–90	The Real Ghostbusters	Osiris, Sandy Van Sanders, Elizabeth	
1987	Sky Commanders	Kreeg	
1987	Ultraman: The Adventure Begins	Andy	Television film
1987	DuckTales	Filler Brushbill, Pluck	Episode: "Much Ado About Scrooge"
1987	Pound Puppies	Shadow Monster	Episode: "The Rescue Pups/Good Night, Sweet Pups"; uncredited
1987	The Little Troll Prince	Stav	Television film
1987–88	The Little Clowns of Happytown	Pranky	
1987–88	Yogi's Treasure Hunt	Greed Monster	
1987–88	BraveStarr	Deputy Fuzz, Tex Hex, others	
1987–88	The New Adventures of Mighty Mouse	Bat-Bat, Moe	
1988	The Good, the Bad, and Huckleberry Hound	Pinky Dalton, Pig, TV Announcer from Bit-2 News	Television film
1988	Rockin' with Judy Jetson	Quark, Zappy	Television film
1988	The New Yogi Bear Show	Additional Voices	
1988	The Completely Mental Misadventures of Ed Grimley	Additional Voices	
1988	Dino-Riders	Hammerhead, Turret, Lokus	
1988	Christmas in Tattertown	Sidney the Spider	
1988–89	Slimer!	Rafael	
1988–90	A Pup Named Scooby-Doo	Mr. O'Greazy, others	
1989	The Further Adventures of SuperTed	Wally	Episode: "Leave It to Space Beavers"
1989	The Karate Kid	Additional Voices	Episode: "My Brother's Keeper"
1989	Dink, the Little Dinosaur	Additional Voices	Episode: "Phantom of the Cave/Dry River"
1989	Camp Candy	Additional Voices	
1989–90	Paddington Bear	Paddington Bear	
1989–83	ABC Weekend Special	Mr. Funnbunny, Street Pig	
1990	Wake, Rattle, and Roll	Igor Jr., Catula	Credited as Charles Adler
1990	Gravedale High	Additional Voices	Episode: "Cleo's Pen Pal"
1990	Timeless Tales from Hallmark	Ugly Duckling, Crocodile #1	Episode: "The Ugly Duckling"
1990	Midnight Patrol: Adventures in the Dream Zone	Rocky	
1990	The Wizard of Oz	Cowardly Lion	
1990–91	TaleSpin	Mad Dog, Hacksaw, Howard Huge	
1990–92	Tiny Toon Adventures	Buster Bunny	Main role
1990–93	Tom & Jerry Kids	Dripple	
1991	Star Street: The Adventures of the Star Kids	Sagi, Moon, Gemo	
1991	Yo Yogi!	Additional Voices	
1991	ProStars	Additional Voices	
1991–92	Darkwing Duck	Major Trenchrot, Andy Ape, Loophole, Mr. Mikey	
1991–96	Captain Planet and the Planeteers	Stalker Slaughter, Piebald, Thylacine, Newt	
1992	Defenders of Dynatron City	Dr. Mayhem	
1992	Goof Troop	Moe the Ghost, Igor, The Magician's Hat	
1992	The Plucky Duck Show	Buster Bunny	
1992	Super Dave: Daredevil for Hire	Additional Voices	
1992–93	The Little Mermaid	Squid #1, Additional Voices	
1992–96	Capitol Critters	Jammet	
1992–97	Eek! The Cat	Bill, others	
1993	Family Dog	Additional Voices	
1993	2 Stupid Dogs	Greg	
1993	Marsupilami	Additional Voices	
1993	Biker Mice from Mars	Corroder Cody	Episode: "The Masked Motorcyclist"
1993	Wild West C.O.W.-Boys of Moo Mesa	Additional Voices	Episode: "Circus Daze"
1993	Mighty Max	Ernie	
1993	Hollyrock-a-Bye Baby	Rocky	Television film
1993	A Flintstone Family Christmas	Additional Voices	
1993	Droopy, Master Detective	Dripple, Screwball Squirrel, Lightning Bolt	
1993–94	Problem Child	Additional Voices	
1993–94	Bonkers	Police Light, Tiny, others	
1993–94	Cro	Steamer, Mojo, Big Red	
1993–94	Sonic the Hedgehog	Snively	
1993–95	SWAT Kats: The Radical Squadron	Chance "T-Bone" Furlong, others	
1993–96	Rocko's Modern Life	Ed Bighead, Bev Bighead, others	
1994	Yogi the Easter Bear	Paulie	Television film
1994	Aladdin	Mechanicles	
1994	Bobby's World	Harry's Dad	
1994–96	Duckman	Sgt. Red Herring, Juan Asalas, Doctor	
1994–97	Aaahh!!! Real Monsters	Ickis, others	
1995	Beavis and Butt-Head	Mr. Adler	
1995	What-a-Mess	Additional Voices	
1995	Santo Bugito	Eaton Woode, Miguel	Credited as Charles Adler
1995–96	Earthworm Jim	Professor Monkey-for-a-Head, others	
1995–97	The Mask: Animated Series	Pete, Sergeant Cole, Ice Cream Man	
1995–97	What a Cartoon!	Various	
1995–97	The Twisted Tales of Felix the Cat	Felix The Cat (Season 2), Various	
1995–99	Timon & Pumbaa	Irwin, others	
1996	The Spooktacular New Adventures of Casper	Additional Voices	
1996	Tales from the Crypt	Smokey	Episode: "The Third Pig"
1996	The Real Adventures of Jonny Quest	Rawlings, Robber #2	Episode: "The Ballad of Belle Bonnet"
1996	Mighty Ducks: The Animated Series	Dr. Droid, Otto Maton, Flork	
1996	Quack Pack	Additional Voices	
1996	Project G.e.e.K.e.R.	Dr. Maston, Jake Dragonn, Gene Damage	
1996	The Tick	Sarcastro	Episode: "The Tick vs. Education"
1996	Jungle Cubs	Ned	
1996–97	The Twisted Tales of Felix the Cat	Felix the Cat (season 2)	
1997	Bruno the Kid	Additional Voices	Episode: "The Unfriendly Skies"
1997	Adventures from the Book of Virtues	Swindler, The Child	Episode: "Humility"
1997	Cave Kids	Bug	Episode: "Beanstalk Blues"
1997	Spicy City	Rocco, ZBig, Additional Voices	
1997	Extreme Ghostbusters	Additional Voices	Episode: "The Unseen"
1997	Men in Black: The Series	Additional Voices	Episode: "The Buzzard Syndrome"
1997–99	Todd McFarlane's Spawn	Additional Voices	
1997–99	Cow and Chicken	Cow, Chicken, The Red Guy, I.R. Baboon, various	
1997–2000	I Am Weasel	I.R. Baboon, The Red Guy, Cow, Chicken	
1997–2006	Space Goofs	Candy Caramella, others	English dub
1998	Channel Umptee-3	Additional Voices	Episode: "The Lying Show"
1998	Oh Yeah! Cartoons	Herr Brush, Koko Bird, Warden, Produce Guy	
1998	The Secret Files of the Spy Dogs	Additional Voices	Credited as Charles Adler
1998	Mad Jack the Pirate	Additional Voices	
1998	Toonsylvania	Additional Voices	
1998–2003	The Wacky Adventures of Ronald McDonald	Hamburglar, McNugget #3, McSplorer	
1999	Hey Arnold!	TV Announcer	Episode: "Love and Cheese/Weighing Harold"
1999	Johnny Bravo	Director, Fan #1	
1999–2001	Rugrats	Ickis, Professor Spooky	Credited as Charles Adler
2000	Pepper Ann	C.J.	Episode: "Burn Hazelnut Burn/Career Daze"
2000	The Wild Thornberrys	Wrestlers	Episode: "Horse Sense"
2000	As Told by Ginger	Principal, Radio Announcer	Episode: "The Party"
2000	100 Deeds for Eddie McDowd	The Dogfather, Retriever	
2000–01	Cartoon Cartoon Fridays	Chicken, I.R. Baboon, The Red Guy	
2000, 2002	The New Woody Woodpecker Show	Bucky Beaver, Caveman Woodpecker	2 episodes
2000–02	Rocket Power	Blimp Announcer, Helicopter Reporter	
2001	The Oblongs	Executive #1	Episode: "My Name Is Robbie"
2002–05	The Grim Adventures of Billy & Mandy	Snowman, Lubbermouth, Zombie Kid	
2003–04	Ozzy & Drix	General Malaise, Abglobtus Goop, Dr. Hammertoe	
2003–07	Jakers! The Adventures of Piggley Winks	Padrig Winks, Mr. Hornsby	
2004	All Grown Up!	Chance, Pete	
2004–05	Dave the Barbarian	Various	
2004–05	The Adventures of Jimmy Neutron, Boy Genius	The Junkman	
2004–06	Brandy & Mr. Whiskers	Mr. Whiskers	
2004–07	Pet Alien	Dinko, Flip, Cap'n Spangley, Dr. Daffodil	
2005–06	The Buzz on Maggie	Additional voices	
2005–06	Danger Rangers	S.A.V.O., additional voices	
2005–08	Camp Lazlo	Additional voices	
2006–07	Loonatics Unleashed	Optimatus, Director	
2006–07	Shuriken School	Principal of Shuriken, Vladimir, Tetsuo, Principal of Katana, Cleaning Lady	English dub
2006–09	The Replacements	Prime Minister Ricobo	
2007	El Tigre: The Adventures of Manny Rivera	Mano Negra	Episode: "Old Money"
2007–08	Random! Cartoons	Finster #2, Space Pilot #2, Evil Guy, Space Thugs	
2007–09	Chowder	Additional voices	
2008	The Emperor's New School	Additional voices	Episode: "Guaka Rules"
2008	Wizards of Waverly Place	Report Card	Episode: "Report Card"
2008	Wolverine and the X-Men	Mojo, Captain Gruber, others	
2009	G.I. Joe: Resolute	Cobra Commander, Stalker, Flint, Gung-Ho	
2009–11	The Super Hero Squad Show	Doctor Doom, Sabretooth, Melter, Super-Skrull, Doombots, Cynthia Von Doom, Wrecker, Captain Britain, Plantman, others	
2010–11	G.I. Joe: Renegades	Cobra Commander, Buzzer, others	
2010–12	Hero Factory	Corroder, Chief Drax, Toxic Reapa, Speed Demon	
2011–15	WordGirl	Additional voices	
2012–14	Ben 10: Omniverse	Proctor Servantis, Blarney Hokestar, Collectimus, others	
2013	Bubble Guppies	Additional voices	Episode: "Sir Nonny the Nice!"
2013	Phineas and Ferb	MODOK	Episode: "Phineas and Ferb: Mission Marvel"
2013–18	Avengers Assemble	MODOK, Super-Adaptoid	
2014	The Tom and Jerry Show	Polly's Mother	Episode: "Holed Up/One of a Kind"
2014	Wander Over Yonder	Stok, Additional voices	Episode: "The Nice Guy/The Timebomb"
2015	Ultimate Spider-Man	MODOK	Episode: "Contest of the Champions: Part 3"
2015	The Awesomes	Additional voices	
2015–22	Blaze and the Monster Machines	The King, White Knight, Robbie, others	
2016	The Lion Guard	Mjomba	Episode: "Too Many Termites"
2016–24	Kulipari	Commander Pigo	
2016–17	Rolling with the Ronks!	Mormagnon	
2019	SpongeBob SquarePants	Manager, Jelly Fisher Gal, Fan Boy	Episode: "Jolly Lodgers"
2019–20	The Rocketeer	The Great Orsino, Clyde	
2019–20	Spider-Man	MODOK, Father Octavius, A.I.M. Agent #1	
2020, 2025	Harley Quinn	Nick Quinzel, Grandpa	2 episodes
2020	Madagascar: A Little Wild	Murray	
2021–22	Rugrats	Graham	

=== Video games ===
List of voice performances in video games
Year	Title	Role	Notes
1996	Normality	Leader Paul	
1996	Nickelodeon 3D Movie Maker	Ickis	Credited as Charles Adler
1996	Blazing Dragons	The Pied Piper, Hunter, Fisherman	
1997	Atomic Bomberman	Bomberman	
1997	Fallout	Harold	
1998	Fallout 2	Harold	
1999	Planescape: Torment	Ignus	Credited as Charles Adler
2000	Baldur's Gate II: Shadows of Amn	Kalah, Telos, Rielev, Rejiek Hidesman	Credited as Charles Adler
2000	Escape from Monkey Island	Jumbeaux LaFeet, Mungle the Pirate Student	Credited as Charles Adler
2000	Sacrifice	Additional Voices	
2000	Stupid Invaders	Candy Hector Caramella, Chicken, Cow, Singing Pufferfish	Credited as Charles Adler
2000	Nicktoons Racing	Ickis	Archival recording
2001	Rugrats: All Growed Up	Dr. Spooky	
2002	Earth and Beyond	Gratis August Var	Credited as Charles Adler
2005	Ty the Tasmanian Tiger 3: Night of the Quinkan	Redback Russ	Credited as Charles Adler
2006	Cartoon Network Racing	Cow, Chicken, The Red Guy, I.R. Baboon	
2009	MadWorld	Jude the Dude, Frank, Killseeker A	
2009	Transformers Revenge of the Fallen: Decepticons	Starscream	Credited as Charles Adler
2009	Transformers: Revenge of the Fallen	Starscream, Sunstorm	
2009	Marvel Super Hero Squad	Doctor Doom, Sabretooth	
2010	Star Trek Online	S'Taass, Gazzan	
2010	Marvel Super Hero Squad: The Infinity Gauntlet	Doctor Doom, Doombot	
2011	Marvel vs. Capcom 3: Fate of Two Worlds	Super-Skrull	Also Ultimate
2011	Marvel Super Hero Squad Online	Doctor Doom, Red Skull, Annihilus, others	Credited as Charles Adler
2011	Marvel Super Hero Squad: Comic Combat	Doctor Doom, Doombot	Credited as Charles Adler
2012	Final Fantasy XIII-2	Additional Voices	Credited as Charles Adler
2013	Marvel Heroes	Super-Skrull	Uncredited
2013	Lightning Returns: Final Fantasy XIII	Additional Voices	
2014	Disney Infinity 2.0	MODOK	
2015	Disney Infinity 3.0	MODOK	
2016	Lego Marvel's Avengers	MODOK	
2016	Skylanders: Imaginators	Chain Reaction, Skunkwalker, Scholarville Mabu	
2018	Red Dead Redemption II	The Local Pedestrian Population	

=== Live-action ===
List of appearances in film and television
Year	Title	Role	Notes
1986	The Redd Foxx Show	Rita / Ralph	2 episodes
1988	Thirtysomething	Mister Squeeze Auditioner	Episode: "The Competition"
1990	1st & Ten	Rod	Episode: "Earn This One for Ernie"
2009	Wake	Priest	
2010	Totally Tracked Down	Himself	Episode: "Estelle Harris: Master of Her Domain"
2011	Hot in Cleveland	Director	2 episodes
2013	I Know That Voice	Himself	Documentary

== Casting and voice director ==
- All Grown Up!
- As Told by Ginger
- Blaze and the Monster Machines
- Bratz (Season 1)
- Bratz Genie Magic
- Bratz: Passion 4 Fashion - Diamondz
- Bratz: Rock Angelz
- Bubble Guppies (Seasons 2–4)
- Dante's Inferno: An Animated Epic
- Dead Space: Downfall
- DreamWorks Dragons: Rescue Riders
- Harley Quinn
- Holly Hobbie and Friends (episodes 1–4)
- Immigrants
- Jimmy Neutron: Boy Genius
- Johnny Bravo Goes to Bollywood
- Kite Man: Hell Yeah!
- Kulipari
- Kung Fu Panda: The Paws of Destiny
- Madagascar: A Little Wild
- Marvel Super Hero Squad: Comic Combat
- Marvel Super Hero Squad: The Infinity Gauntlet
- Me, Eloise
- New Looney Tunes (season 1)
- Rocket Power
- Rugrats (1991)
- Rugrats (2021)
- Rugrats Go Wild
- Rugrats in Paris: The Movie
- Sabrina: Secrets of a Teenage Witch
- Stressed Eric
- Stripperella
- The Bob's Burgers Movie
- The Brothers Flub
- The Buzz on Maggie
- The Emperor's New School
- The Happy Elf
- The Marvelous Misadventures of Flapjack (Season 1)
- The Nutty Professor
- The Replacements
- The Rugrats Movie
- The Wacky Adventures of Ronald McDonald
- The Wild Thornberrys
- The Wild Thornberrys Movie
- Todd McFarlane's Spawn
- Top Cat Begins

== Awards and nominations ==
Year	Award	Category	Work	Result
1985	Helen Hayes Award	Outstanding Lead Actor in a Touring Production	Torch Song Trilogy	Won
1999	Annie Award	Outstanding Individual Achievement for Voice Acting in an Animated Television Production	Cow and Chicken	Nominated
2000	Annie Award	Outstanding Individual Achievement for Voice Acting in an Animated Television Production	Cow and Chicken	Nominated
2003	Daytime Emmy Award	Outstanding Children's Animated Program	Rugrats	Won
2020	Daytime Emmy Award	Outstanding Directing for an Animated Program	Kung Fu Panda: The Paws of Destiny	Nominated

Preceded by Michael Dobson	Voice of Starscream; 2007	Succeeded by Tom Kenny
Preceded by Tom Kenny	Voice of Starscream; 2009	Succeeded by Sam Riegel
Preceded by Steven Blum	Voice of Starscream; 2011	Succeeded by Steven Blum
