= Immigrants (2008 film) =

- Film poster
- Hungarian: Immigrants - Jóska menni Amerika
- Directed by: Gabor Csupo
- Written by: Billiam Coronel; Josh Lieb
- Produced by: Arlene Klasky; Gabor Csupo; Gabor Kalomista; Tamas Rakosi
- Starring: Hank Azaria; Eric McCormack
- Edited by: Mano Csillag; Peter Tomaszewicz
- Music by: Drew Neumann; Gregory Hinde; Gabor Csupo
- Production company: Klasky Csupo/Global Tantrum (Note: Animation outsourced to Anivision Korea and Sunwoo Digital International.)
- Distributed by: Hungaricom (Hungary); Grand Allure Entertainment (international)
- Release dates: 30 October 2008 (Hungary); 31 October 2009 (United States)
- Running time: 77 minutes
- Countries: United States; Hungary
- Languages: English; Hungarian

Immigrants (Hungarian title: Immigrants - Jóska menni Amerika) is a 2008 adult animated comedy film directed by Gábor Csupó. It is also known as L.A. Dolce Vita or Immigrants: L.A. Dolce Vita. It is the fifth and (to date) final feature-length film from the studio Klasky Csupo, and the first and only feature-length animated movie that was directed by Csupo. It is also the only Klasky Csupo film without Paramount Pictures or Nickelodeon's involvement.

The characters and storyline in this film were the basis for a new animated series for Spike TV, which was scheduled to debut in August 2004. However, despite scheduling a two-hour marathon for the series premiere and ordering an additional six episodes, the series never aired due to the decline of animation programming on Spike TV. It was later compiled into a film and released in Hungary on October 30, 2008.

In America, the film was released on Region 1 DVD in 2009 by Echo Bridge Home Entertainment.

== Plot ==
Jóska, a Hungarian immigrant in Los Angeles, shares an apartment with Vladislav, a Russian immigrant. In their quest for the "American Dream", they encounter all kinds of troubles, wild adventures and comical situations. The pair are routinely saved by their big hearts and loyalty to each other in this unlikely tale of friendship in a foreign country.

== Characters ==
- Vladislav is a Russian immigrant who has a teenage daughter, Anya. He desperately seeks to land a job to support his daughter and Jóska, he occasionally lets out a jolly-like laugh whenever he's happy.
- Jóska is a Hungarian immigrant and is a roommate of Vladislav. Unlike his friend, he is somewhat familiar with US culture, he occasionally whistles a happy tune.
- Anya is Vladislav's daughter who tries to fit in as a normal teenager such as getting a tattoo.
- Flaco is Vladislav and Jóska's Hispanic friend who lives with his wife.
- Nazam is the Pakistani immigrant father of four daughters (who all wear hijabs in public) and his only son who works as a celebrity bus driver for tourists.
- Rashid is a Pakistani teenager who lives with his father Nazam, he is also a brother to four sisters and friend of Anya and Min.
- Chea is Min's father who owns a Chinese restaurant where everything costs one-dollar.
- Min is Chea's Chinese daughter, and Anya's friend, who works in her father's restaurant.
- Splits is the African-American neighbor of Jóska and Vladislav. He routinely informs anyone who will listen that he had sex with a thousand women.
- Greta Night is the old landlady of the foreign occupants. She is attracted to Vladislav and occasionally offers to marry him to extend his stay in America (while also offering to "jumpstart his sex life"). She also threatens to call immigration whenever her residents do anything of which she disapproves.

== Voice cast ==
=== Cast ===
- Ferenc Hujber as Joska
- Győző Szabó as Vlad
- Szonja Oroszlán as Anya
- Titanilla Bogdányi as Min Chea
- Gábor Reviczky as Splits Jackson
- Imre Józsa as Mr. Chea
- Zolee Ganxsta as Flaco
- József Kerekes as Nazam Kazmi
- Levente Molnár as Rashid Kazmi
- Judit Hernádi as Greta Knight

=== Supporting cast ===
- Sándor Fábry as Businessman
- Zsóka Kapocs as Christina Aguilera
- Ferenc Rákóczi as Hentes (Butcher)
- Aranka Halász as Madame Loo
- István Szellő as TV Reporter
- András Both as Doorman
- István Kovács as Doorman Trainer
- Péter Kálloy-Molnár as Glutco Manager
- Jozsef Lang as Sam
- Iván Kamarás as Bar Owner

=== Cast ===
- Hank Azaria as Joska
- Eric McCormack as Vlad
- Milana Vayntrub as Anya
- Lauren Tom as Min Chea
- Carl Lumbly as Splits Jackson
- Freddy Rodriguez as Flaco
- Ahmed Ahmed as Nazam Kazmi
- Vik Sahay as Rashid Kazmi
- Patti Deutsch as Greta Knight

=== Supporting cast ===
- Quinton Flynn as TV Reporter, Hermaphrodite, Glutco Manager, Businessman
- Karen Maruyama as Madame Loo
- Laraine Newman as Lady #2, Nurse
- Christina Pickles as Harriet
- Freddy Rodriguez as Crutches Guy
- Tom Kenny as Craig, Courier
- Dan Castellaneta as Bar Owner
- Ed O'Ross as Officer Kaufman
- Natalija Nogulich as Angry Tenant
- Takayo Fischer as Japanese Woman
- Ahmed Ahmed as Monk
- Jack Angel as Longshoreman
- Scott Menville as Diseased Guy, Frat Boy
- Vik Sahay as Band Leader, Cheesy Guy
- Will Shin as Gangbanger
- Erv Immerman as Mr. Witte
- Lynne Maclean as Mrs. Richie
- Mick Murray as Charlie
- Dave Walsh as Mouqard
- Stacey Ferguson as Christina Aguilera, Skinny Woman
- Bret Csupo as Woman 1-2
- Jen Alexander as Gloureus Woman
- Nick Dickinson as Tattoo Guy
- Jeremy Ratchford as Tattoo Artist
- Marc Jordan as Detective
- Tema Bonita as Exotic Lady
- Mark DeCarlo as Butcher
- James Harmon as Mr. Lowham
- Diane Michelle as Ms. Lowham, Binkie Lady
- Jeff Bennett as Health Inspector
- Michael J. Gough as Counter Clerk
- Andre Ware as Customer, Bus Rider #2
- Rodney Saulsberry as Paramedic
- Lauren Tom as Lady #1
- Marabina Jaimes as Lady #3
- Jim Ward as Doctor, Bus Rider #3
- Hope Levy as Bus Rider #1
- Courtenay Taylor as Sexy Nurse
- Candi Milo as Waitress, Teen Girl #1
- Gregg Berger as Sam
- Rino Romano as Yoga Teacher
- Kimberly Brooks as Teen Girl #2
- Kevin Michael Richardson as Doorman
- Mikey Kelley as DJ
- Dee Bradley Baker as Steve The Pig
- Dorie Burton as Ms. Binkie, Redless Club
- Vaikette Hoffman as Blind Club
- Tasia Valenza as Coffee Cashier
- Cristina Pucelli as Valley Girl
- Rene Auberjonois as Doorman Trainer
- Hank Azaria as Sylvester
- Frank Welker as Indian General
- Lambardo Boyar as Dishwasher, Alto
- Jesse Corti as Bass
