= Phil Snyder =

American voice actor, comedian, author, animator, musician, screenwriter and producer

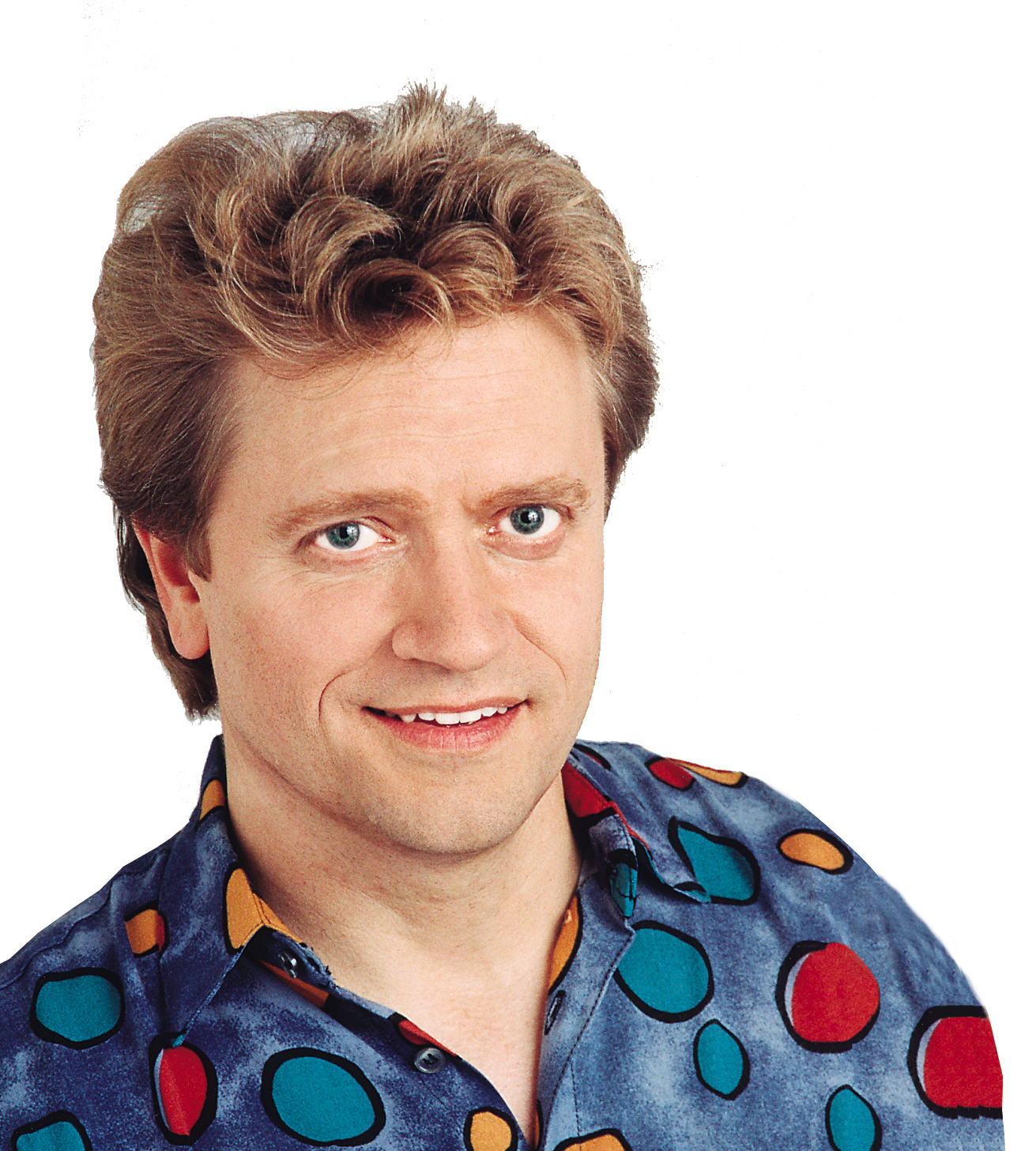
- Snyder in 1997
- Born: Philip Charles Snyder; February 6, 1953 (age 73); Ellensburg, Washington, U.S.
- Occupations: Voice actor; stand-up comedian; author; animator; musician; singer-songwriter; director; screenwriter; producer
- Years active: 1974–present
- Agent: Tisherman Gilbert Motley Drozdoski
- Children: 3
- Website: Official website

Philip Charles Snyder (born February 6, 1953) is a voice actor and stand-up comedian.

== Career ==
He was born the sixth child in a family of ten children. He began to demonstrate his love for, and natural skills in entertainment, especially impressions, at an early age. Snyder moved to Los Angeles, California, in 1974 to pursue a career in show business. After a few false starts, he became a regular paid performer at The Comedy Store. He began pursuing a career in voice-overs for animated cartoons and commercials. In 1996, Snyder had his first guest role in an animated TV series as Newt Gingrich and "Bob" in an episode of Steven Spielberg's Pinky and the Brain. The episode title was "The Pink Candidate".

In 1998, Snyder starred in his first feature film as Mr. Toad in the American version of Martin Gates's The Wind in the Willows. (Note: The version of The Wind in the Willows which starred Phil Snyder as Mr. Toad was originally produced in the UK by M.G.P. Productions, with Rik Mayall in the role.) Snyder also played the villain, Thaddeus J. Pinchworm, in The Wacky Adventures of Ronald McDonald, which was animated by Klasky Csupo.

In May 2010, Snyder began to voice the Disney character, Jiminy Cricket. His first appearance as him was in the popular video game series, Kingdom Hearts. He took over the role from Eddie Carroll, who died in April 2010.

He is also the voice of the Mattel Toys interactive talking toy, "Stinky the Garbage Truck," which made its debut in 2010.

Snyder began teaching at the University of Houston in their College of Technology's Digital Media Program in 2013, and won their Teaching Excellence Award in 2015.

== Filmography ==
=== Film ===
Year	Title	Role	Notes
1995	The Wind in Willows	Mr. Toad	Voice
2001, 2003	The Wacky Adventures of Ronald McDonald	Thaddeus J. Pinchworm, Stiles	Voice, direct-to-video series
2002	The Creation Adventure Team: Six Short Days, One Big Adventure	Proto	Voice, direct-to-video
2003	The Creation Adventure Team: A Jurassic Ark Mystery	Proto	Voice, direct-to-video
2014	The Elements Club: Lord of Flawless Strength	Various voices	Direct-to-video

=== Television ===
Year	Title	Role	Notes
1996	Pinky and the Brain	Bob	Voice, episode: "The Pink Candidate"

=== Video games ===
Year	Title	Voice role	Notes
1997	Popeye and the Quest for the Woolly Mammoth	Swee Pea	
1998	Popeye & the Sunken Treasure	Swee Pea	
2008	Tom Clancy's EndWar	Additional voices	
2011	Kingdom Hearts Re:coded	Jiminy Cricket	
2012	Kingdom Hearts 3D: Dream Drop Distance	Jiminy Cricket	
2015	The Elements Club: Unity Match	Additional voices	
2017	Kingdom Hearts HD 2.8 Final Chapter Prologue	Jiminy Cricket (archive footage)	

=== Theme parks ===
Year	Title	Voice role	Notes
2003	Health Royale	Slim Pick-It	

=== Commercials and promos ===
- Disney Christmas Ad: Jiminy Cricket (Disney Home Video)
- Stinky Garbage Truck Ad: Stinky (Young & Rubicam/Mattel)
- Tropicana Orange Juice: Orange (Pepsico/Element 79)
- 7-Eleven Stores: Cartoon Man (Richards Group/PBS)
- Popeye’s Chicken: Popeye, Olive, Whimpy (Hill, Holiday Altschiller)
- Premier Parks: Popeye, Olive, Bluto (Ackerman McQueen)
- Toys ‘r’ Us: Tough Guy, Crazy Guy (Wells Rich Greene)
- Blockbuster Video: Octopus (Bernstein-Rein)

=== Television and episodic webisodes ===
- Ad It Up: Just Ad Milk (Pilot): Writer/Producer/Director (KAZAP Corp.)
- The Numbears: All Roles (8 Million YouTube Views) (KAZAP Corp.)
- 24—online Animated: George Mason (Imagine Ent.)
- Something So Right: Hector the Stuttering Parrot (Universal/NBC)

=== Radio, commercials, and talk shows ===
- Discover Card: Elf (Shine Adv/DG Entertainment)
- Quik Trip: Dad (Richards Group)
- Jc Penney: Crazy Announcer (Ackerman McQueen)
- Boatman’s Bank: 3rd Little Pig (TBWA Kerlick Switzer)
- Infincom Copiers: Dudley Doo-Right, Snidley (Moses Anshell)
- Rick Dees Top 40: Featured (Syndicated)

=== Comedy clubs and live concerts ===
- Comedy Stores of Hollywood, Las Vegas, La Jolla, & Universal City, Atlantis Hotel in Atlantic City (Jeff Kutash's "Superstars & Stripes") Also regular at Ice House, Laff Stop, Igby’s, Coconuts, Laugh Factory, and Los Angeles area comedy clubs. Toured with World Champion gymnast, Kurt Thomas's "Gymnastics America" as MC/Host.

== Education ==
- Electronics (A.S.) – Los Angeles Valley College 1985
- Advanced Biblical Studies (Diploma) – Liberty University 1990
- Cinema & Television Arts – Multimedia Production (B.A.) – California State University Northridge 2009
- Master of Fine Arts, Television/Film/Theatre (M.F.A.) – California State University Los Angeles 2012
