= The Wacky Adventures of Ronald McDonald =

1998 animated television series

- Title card
- Genre: Adventure; Fantasy; Comedy; Musical
- Starring: Jack Doepke (ep. 1–3); David Hussey (ep. 4–6); Kevin Michael Richardson; Charlie Adler; Christine Cavanaugh; Dee Bradley Baker; Pamela Adlon; Jazmine A. Corona; Jim Cummings; Nika Futterman; Paul Greenberg; Alex D. Linz; Lisa Raggio; Kath Soucie; Verne Troyer
- Opening theme: "McDonaldland is Changing" by Pinky Villandry (ep. 1–3); "The Wacky Adventures of Ronald McDonald" by David Hussey (as Ronald McDonald) (ep. 4–6)
- Composers: Mark Mothersbaugh; Bob Mothersbaugh
- Country of origin: United States
- Original language: English
- No. of episodes: 6

Production
- Executive producers: Arlene Klasky; Gábor Csupó
- Running time: 40 minutes
- Production companies: Klasky Csupo; McDonald's

Original release
- Release: October 9, 1998 – January 30, 2003

The Wacky Adventures of Ronald McDonald is an American animated direct-to-video television series, produced by Klasky Csupo in association with the McDonald's Corporation. It centers on McDonald's mascot Ronald McDonald and the gang in McDonaldland having many adventures and learning lessons.

== Premise ==
The show follows the adventures of Ronald McDonald and his best friends Grimace, Hamburglar, Birdie, and Sundae.

== Cast ==
=== Main ===
The voice talents on the series includes Klasky Csupo veterans Charlie Adler, Christine Cavanaugh, and Kath Soucie. The role of Ronald McDonald is credited as "Himself."

- Jack Doepke (ep. 1–3) and David Hussey (ep. 4–6) as Ronald McDonald
- Kevin Michael Richardson as Grimace and King Gunga
- Charlie Adler as Hamburglar, McNugget #3, and The McSplorer
- Christine Cavanaugh as Birdie the Early Bird
- Dee Bradley Baker as Sundae (voice), The TV Monitor, and The Squirrel
- Pamela Adlon as McNugget #1
- Jazmine A. Corona as Tika
- James Jonah Cummings as The Announcer
- Nika Futterman as Fry Kid #3
- Paul Greenberg as Fry Kid #2
- Alex D. Linz as Franklin
- Lisa Raggio as McNugget #2
- Kath Soucie as Fry Kid #1
- Verne Troyer as Sundae (suit) (ep. 1–3)

=== Guest cast ===
- Jeff Glen Bennett as The TV Man and Knight #1
- Gregg Berger as The Barber, The Fat Man, and Foodfight Walla
- Corey Burton as The Bug and The Mob Man #1
- David Eccles as The Bear
- Bill Farmer as Knight #2 and The Mob Leader
- Henry Gibson as The Blue Planet
- Kim Mai Guest as The Kids
- Billie Hayes as One-Eyed Sally
- Bob Joles as Mayor McCheese, The Mob Man #2, and Knight #3
- Carol Kane as Org's Mom
- Maurice LaMarche as Dr. Quizzical, The Burger Chef, and Knight #4
- Jeff Lupetin as Iam Hungry
- Euan MacDonald as Simon
- Mona Marshall as The Kids
- Drew Massey as Pip
- Julie Merrill as The TV Woman
- Richard Moll as Org's Dad
- Patrick Pinney as The Phantom Head
- Phil Snyder as Professor Thaddeus J. Pinchworm and Stiles
- Warren Sroka as King Murray
- Andre Stojka as The Royal Chef
- Tara Strong as The Girl, The Boy, and The Sheep
- Meshach Taylor as The Pink Planet
- James Kevin Ward as Scotty
- Gedde Watanabe as The Karate Master
- Bruce Weitz as Blather
- Julian West as Dad and The Police Officer
- Carl W. Wolfe as Org

== Episodes ==
No.	Title	Directed by	Written by	Original release date
1	"Scared Silly"	John Holmquist	Andrew McElfresh & Michael Bloom	October 9, 1998
Ronald and his friends go on a camping trip in the Far-Flung Forest, where Ronald discovers an old house which he assumes is haunted by a ghost called the Far-Flung Phantom. Due to a sudden storm, the campers are forced to stay in the old house, where a Phantom head leads them through a challenging game that will help them to escape, if they cooperate. Along the way, the Fry Kids and McNuggets get caught in traps and are separated from the group and the rest face off against the Phantom head in a challenge of riddles. Tika, Hamburglar, and Birdie fail each riddle and are swept into traps, leaving only Ronald, Grimace, and Sundae to solve the final one, which they succeed. The holographic head turns out to be a child named Franklin programming the game, with help from Tika and the McNuggets in a lab room. After Ronald gets a "You Win" out of Franklin, Dr. Quizzical returns to catch his son in the act and reveals that Franklin has done something like this before. Franklin apologizes to the gang for his actions and is allowed to join in their camping trip, becoming their new friend in the process. Note: The only appearance of the Fry Kids in the series. This also marked the debut of Klasky Csupo's Splaat logo.
2	"The Legend of Grimace Island"	Jim Duffy	Mark Zaslove & Eryk Casemiro	January 22, 1999
Ronald and the gang go out on a journey to Grimace Island (where Grimace's species is originated) after Grimace receives a letter supposedly by the island's residents asking for help. Unbeknownst to everyone, the letter was actually written by pirate captain One-Eyed Sally and her first mate Blather in a scheme by the two to follow the gang to the island in order to seize the Grimaces' legendary treasure for themselves. Note: Franklin is present in this episode.
3	"The Visitors from Outer Space"	Jeff Scott	David Regal	April 23, 1999
Hamburglar tricks the gang into believing that aliens have come to Earth so that he can steal McDonaldland's hamburgers without interference from them, which costs him their trust in him when they find out. Later, Hamburglar gets abducted by real aliens after foolishly accepting an offer to go on vacation with them, not realizing until too late that the vacation lasts thousands of Earth years. Despite being angry at him for his lie and prank, Ronald and his friends go on a mission in outer space to rescue Hamburglar. Note: Ronald and Sundae go down the ball pit slide for the last time as this is the last episode to have the original introduction and closing. It is also the last episode where Sundae appears in the live-action segments. Prior to this episode, there was a Rugrats episode with the same title.
4	"Birthday World"	Anthony Bell	David Regal; Additional Material by: Emily Kapnek & Eryk Casemiro	February 23, 2001
Hamburglar is upset that he forgot Ronald's birthday and does not have a present for him until an evil mad scientist named Professor Thaddeus J. Pinchworm gives him tickets to a fake amusement park called Birthday World. During their visit, Ronald and his friends quickly become disappointed to find that most of the park's rides are broken and/or malfunctioning; they then ride a roller coaster which turns them into toddlers and babies with a ray. The gang then discovers that they were test subjects for Pinchworm's evil scheme to use a bigger version of the ray to de-age the world's population in order to achieve world domination. Despite the fact that the ray's effects have left their abilities limited, Ronald and his friends set out to stop Pinchworm's scheme and restore themselves to their regular ages. Note: A new opening sequence was made for this episode and the next two. As a result, Sundae no longer appears in the live-action segments but is heard once offscreen. This is Tika's last appearance.
5	"Have Time, Will Travel"	Anthony Bell	Emily Kapnek; Additional Material by: Eryk Casemiro & David Regal	October 19, 2001
While helping Franklin clean up his father's lab, Ronald and his pals stumble across a time machine in which Hamburglar dreams up a crazy scheme to use the time machine to get out of cleaning and they end up getting lost in time. Their time travel adventures take them to prehistoric times, where the time machine is nearly digested by a Tyrannosaurus and they meet their cavemen ancestors, medieval times, where they entertain the spoiled young King Murray with in order to save a captured Birdie, the Wild West, where they discover Hamburglar's ancestor Henry H. Burglar II (whom the residents mistake Hamburglar for) and the disco era of the 1970s, where they briefly encounter Mayor McCheese. Note: The only episode where the McNuggets are absent. This is also Franklin's last appearance.
6	"The Monster O' McDonaldland Loch"	Anthony Bell	Barbara Herndon & Jill Gorey; Additional Material by: Eryk Casemiro & David Regal	January 30, 2003
The gang travels to a Scottish expedition known as McDonaldland Loch where Sundae's cousin Scotty lives. They also come across a plot by a mad scientist named Stiles and his assistant Pip's attempt to build a replica of the Loch Ness Monster in order to make money from the discovery. Birdie befriends the real Loch Ness Monster, who is named Simon and wants his existence to be kept a secret. Despite not being good at keeping secrets, Birdie agrees to this, but this becomes difficult when Stiles and Pip's scheme goes awry, putting everyone in danger.

== Release and reception ==
The series was produced and released on VHS, with five of the episodes being available exclusively in participating McDonald's restaurants from October 9, 1998 to January 30, 2003.

By various accounts, the episodes turned out to be rather popular, to which individual McDonald's locations frequently ran out of VHS tapes, which were sold individually for $3.49 and could be bought with a small vanilla ice cream cone or Diet Coke. Klasky Csupo also sold them through their online gift shop, which was shut down in fall 2005.

A Happy Meal featuring Lego vehicles to build was released at McDonald's in 1999, a year after the series premiered. The front of each vehicle had an image of one of the McDonaldland characters in the Klasky Csupo style, as depicted in the series.

== Crew ==
- Charlie Adler – Voice Director
- Barbara Wright – Casting Director
- Terry Thoren – Executive In Charge of Production
- Tracy Kramer – Executive In Charge of Production
- Glenwood Editorial, Inc. – Track Reading
- Grimsaem Animation – Overseas Production Facility
- Sunwoo Entertainment – Overseas Production Facility
