= Santo Bugito =

- Created by: Arlene Klasky
- Developed by: Lane Raichert
- Voices of: Marabina Jaimes; Tony Plana; Charlie Adler; Joan Van Ark; George Kennedy; Candi Milo; William Sanderson; Michael Stanton; Cheech Marin; Henry Gibson; David Paymer
- Composers: Mark Mothersbaugh; Bob Mothersbaugh; Bruce Young Berman
- Country of origin: United States
- Original language: English
- No. of seasons: 1
- No. of episodes: 13

Production
- Executive producers: Arlene Klasky; Gabor Csupo
- Production companies: Anivision; Klasky Csupo

Original release
- Network: CBS
- Release: September 16, 1995 – August 17, 1996

Santo Bugito is an American animated television series produced and developed by Klasky-Csupo for CBS and created by Arlene Klasky. It ran for thirteen episodes and revolved around the goings on in a fictional community of insects. The show was advertised as the first Tex-Mex cartoon.

Notable achievements of this series included a revival of the insect-community genre (little of which had been seen since Mr. Bug Goes to Town), and voice cameos from well known performers such as Jim Belushi. The regular cast included Tony Plana, William Sanderson, Henry Gibson, George Kennedy, Cheech Marin and Joan Van Ark.

== Synopsis ==
Santo Bugito is set in a titular border town between Texas and Mexico, populated by various anthropomorphic insects. Carmen De La Antchez (Marabina Jaimes) is the show's protagonist, an ant who runs a restaurant in the town with her husband, Paco (Tony Plana). The town is populated by other insects, including two brash American flies, Clem (William Sanderson) and Burt (Michael Stanton), a hyperactive flea named Lencho (Cheech Marin), a cynical artist termite named Eaton Woode (Charles Adler), a butterfly named Rosa (Candi Milo) and her boyfriend Miguel who is still in his cocoon, Amelia (Joan Van Ark), an enthusiastic damselfly, Ralph, a large friendly ladybug with a deep voice (George Kennedy) and a praying mantis professor who occasionally interrupts the show to give dull educational lectures, but is usually pushed off-screen by another character.

The show primarily deals with slice of life stories, but often with a strange insect twist. Some episodes include the town still trying to operate when Carmen is bedridden with a broken leg ("The Carmen Tango"), Lencho trying to attract a famous black widow spider dancer to perform in the town ("A Widow Goes a Long Way"), and one where a mosquito lawyer named Emma Squito comes to town, and everyone in the town is caught up in a suing frenzy, in exchange for Emma sucking the blood from each of her clients ("Sue City"). A mariachi band of ants occasionally narrate the action with music.

== Main cast ==
- Marabina Jaimes - Carmen
- Tony Plana - Paco
- Charlie Adler - Eaton and Miguel
- Joan Van Ark - Amelia
- George Kennedy - Ralph
- Henry Gibson - Mothmeyer
- Candi Milo - Rosa
- David Paymer - The Professor
- William Sanderson - Clem
- Michael Stanton - Burt
- Cheech Marin - Lencho

== Episodes ==
Only 13 episodes were aired, and the series was canceled after only one season.

1. Load o' Bees
2. Sue City
3. Splitsville
4. The Carmen Tango
5. Cupid vs. Clem
6. Swiped
7. A Widow Goes a Long Way
8. The Carnivore Kid
9. Lost Cause
10. How to Eat People and Make New Friends
11. My Name Is Revenge
12. Bugged Bug
13. Buenos Roaches
