= Recess: School's Out =

2001 animated Disney film directed by Chuck Sheetz

- Theatrical release poster
- Directed by: Chuck Sheetz
- Screenplay by: Jonathan Greenberg
- Story by: Joe Ansolabehere; Paul Germain; Jonathan Greenberg
- Based on: Recess by Paul Germain; Joe Ansolabehere
- Produced by: Paul Germain; Joe Ansolabehere; Stephen Swofford
- Starring: Dabney Coleman; Andrew Lawrence; Rickey D'Shon Collins; Jason Davis; Ashley Johnson; Courtland Mead; Pamela Adlon; James Woods
- Edited by: Tony Mizgalski
- Music by: Denis M. Hannigan
- Production companies: Walt Disney Television Animation (Note: Animation handled by Walt Disney Television Animation Digital Production, outsourced to Sunwoo Animation and Sunwoo Digital International.); Paul & Joe Productions
- Distributed by: Buena Vista Pictures Distribution (Note: Distributed under the Walt Disney Pictures banner.)
- Release dates: February 10, 2001 (premiere); February 16, 2001 (United States)
- Running time: 83 minutes
- Country: United States
- Language: English
- Budget: $23 million
- Box office: $44.5 million

Recess: School's Out (also known as Recess: The Movie – School's Out) is a 2001 American animated adventure comedy film based on the Disney television series Recess. Directed by Chuck Sheetz and written by Jonathan Greenberg, the film features the voices of Andrew Lawrence, Rickey D'Shon Collins, Jason Davis, Ashley Johnson, Courtland Mead, Pamela Adlon, Dabney Coleman, Melissa Joan Hart, April Winchell, and James Woods.

Set after the events of the series' original run, the film centers around T.J. Detweiler and his friends uncovering a plot to get rid of summer vacation taking place at their school. It was produced for Walt Disney Pictures by Walt Disney Television Animation and Walt Disney Television Animation Digital Production with animation done by Sunwoo Animation and Sunwoo Digital International.

The film was distributed by Buena Vista Pictures Distribution, premiered on February 10, 2001, and was released theatrically in the United States on February 16, 2001. The film received mixed reviews from critics, but performed well at the box office, grossing $44.5 million on a $23 million budget.

== Plot ==
A group of men break into a military base and steal a top-secret project, intending to use Third Street School as their headquarters. After pranking Principal Prickly on the last day of school before summer vacation, T.J. Detweiler is excited to spend the time off with his friends, only to be disappointed to learn they will all be attending different summer camps. Resigned to spending the summer alone, T.J. notices strange activity at Third Street School. Investigating further, he sees scientists performing strange experiments with a tractor beam. After neither his parents nor the police believe him, he goes to Prickly, who prepares to show T.J. the school is empty, but is dematerialized when trying to enter the building.

Desperate, T.J. blackmails his older sister Becky to drive him to all the camps to retrieve his friends. They all return with him to Third Street School, but accuse him of deceit after recovering a box of inconsequential documents from the school. T.J.'s suspicions are verified when they all see a giant laser emerging from the school roof and formulate a plan of camp during the day and meeting up at night. After T.J. finds Prickly's discarded pants with a note reading "Help Me!" in the pocket, the gang infiltrate the school to rescue him. Randall Weems, who has been eavesdropping on them, goes to inform deputy principal Muriel Finster.

The kids find the auditorium has been turned into a laboratory. T.J. is captured while his friends escape, and he is imprisoned with Prickly. They both discover that Prickly's old friend Dr. Phillium Benedict is overseeing the operation inside the school. Prickly explains that back in spring of 1968, while he, Benedict and Finster were all in teacher training, Benedict was appointed Principal of Third Street School and proposed abolishing recess to improve test grades. Concerned for the children, Prickly went to the superintendent, who promptly fired Benedict and replaced him as principal with Prickly, which also led to Finster, his girlfriend at the time, breaking up with him. Swearing revenge on Prickly for costing him his job and his girlfriend, Benedict became a politician and worked his way into becoming Secretary of Education, but was fired by the President for attempting to abolish recess nationwide.

While T.J.'s friends review the recovered papers, Spinelli finds a date book that mentions lunar perigee. Gretchen realizes the machine they saw is a tractor beam and concludes that Benedict intends to use it to move the moon when it nears Earth. T.J. and Prickly get to Prickly's office, where they discover Benedict's plan to eradicate summer vacation by creating a new permanent ice age that will force kids indoors year-round. Meanwhile, T.J.'s friends persuade Becky to drive them to the camps and gather all the other students, while Finster rallies the teachers, and Gus concocts a plan to infiltrate the school.

As Benedict prepares to enact his plan in the auditorium, the students and teachers of Third Street School all arrive and battle his henchmen. During the ensuing fight, Benedict attempts to activate the beam himself but is stopped by Prickly, only for Benedict to break the controls and make the process irreversible. T.J. instructs Vince to throw a baseball at the beam, which destroys it. Finally aware of Benedict's plot, the police arrive at the school to arrest him and his henchmen. T.J.'s friends decide to spend the rest of their summer together. T.J. thanks Prickly in his office, who in turn thanks T.J. for reminding him why he started teaching: to help kids. T.J. then joins his friends as Prickly jokingly reminds T.J. he will still be reprimanded for his earlier prank when September comes.

== Voice cast ==
- Rickey D'Shon Collins as Vince LaSalle, T.J.'s athletic best friend.
- Jason Davis as Mikey Blumberg, an overweight boy with a baritone singing voice.
  - Robert Goulet as Mikey's singing voice. This was Goulet's final theatrical film role before his death in 2007.
- Ashley Johnson as:
  - Gretchen Grundler, the intelligent strategist of the gang.
  - Ashley Tomassian, one of the Ashleys.
- Andy Lawrence as Theodore Jasper "T.J." Detweiler, the leader of the Recess gang.
- Courtland Mead as Gus Griswald, a boy with high military knowledge.
- Pamela Segall Adlon as Ashley Spinelli, a violent, short-fused tomboy who doesn't really like her first name because of it being associated with the Ashleys group.
- Dabney Coleman as Principal Peter Prickly, the principal of Third Street School.
- Melissa Joan Hart as Becky Detweiler, T.J.'s older sister who later becomes the assistant manager at Floppy Burger.
- Peter MacNicol as Professor Fenwick, Dr. Benedict's meek second-in-command.
- April Winchell as:
  - Ms. Muriel Finster, the deputy principal of Third Street School and a professional boxer.
  - Mrs. Detweiler, T.J. and Becky's mother.
- James Woods as Dr. Phillium Benedict, Principal Prickly's former best friend, and the mastermind of the plot to eradicate summer vacation.
- Diedrich Bader as Guard #2.
- Allyce Beasley as Ms. Alordayne Grotke, a teacher at Third Street School, who specializes in martial arts.
- Gregg Berger as Tech #1.
- Klee Bragger as Digger Sam, one of the two diggers.
- Clancy Brown as "Kojak", AKA Bald Guy, Dr. Benedict's aggressive chief of security, who has an intense dislike for children, especially T.J.
- Dan Castellaneta as Guard #1.
- Toran Caudell as King Bob, the king of the playground at Third Street School.
- Rachel Crane as Ashley Quinlan, one of the Ashleys.
- Elizabeth Daily as Captain Sticky.
- Lee Ermey as Col. O'Malley.
- Ron Glass as:
  - Dr. Lazenby.
  - Tech #2.
- Tony Jay as Dr. Rosenthal, the first head scientist, who is punished after the tractor beam malfunctions.
- Clyde Kusatsu as Mr. Yamashiro.
- Charles Kimbrough as Mort Chalk.
- Tress MacNeille as:
  - Lunchlady Irma.
  - Opera Director.
  - Dr. Steinheimer.
- Andrea Martin as Lunchlady Harriet.
- Anndi McAfee as Ashley Armbruster, the leader of the Ashleys group.
- Mark Robert Myers as Technician.
- Ryan O'Donohue as:
  - Digger Dave, one of the two diggers.
  - Randall Weems, the school snitch.
- Phil Proctor as:
  - Golfer #2.
  - Scientist #2.
- Patrick Renna as Jordan.
- Kevin Michael Richardson as Cop #2.
- Jack Riley as Golfer #1.
- Justin Shenkarow as:
  - Soldier Kid.
  - Wrestler Kid.
- Michael Shulman as Hustler Kid.
- Francesca Marie Smith as:
  - Ashley Boulet, one of the Ashleys.
  - Swinger Girl.
  - Upside Down Girl.
- Kath Soucie as Counselor.
- Robert Stack as Superintendent.
- Ken Swofford as Coach.
- Nick Turturro as Cop #1.
- Erik von Detten (erroneously credited as "Erik Von Dettin") as:
  - Captain Brad.
  - Erwin Lawson, the school bully.
- Paul Willson as:
  - Coach Kloogie.
  - Mr. Detweiler, T.J. and Becky's father.

== Music ==
=== Soundtrack ===
Recess: School's Out (Original Movie Soundtrack)

Soundtrack album by Various Artists
- Released: January 13, 2001
- Genre: Soundtrack
- Label: Walt Disney

Singles from Recess: School's Out
- 1. "Green Tambourine"; 2. "Dancing in the Street"

Soundtrack
Review scores
Source	Rating
Allmusic	3/5 stars

No.	Title	Performer	Length
1.	"Dancing in the Street"	Martha and the Vandellas	2:38
2.	"Born to Be Wild"	Steppenwolf	3:28
3.	"One"	Three Dog Night	3:02
4.	"Incense and Peppermints"	Strawberry Alarm Clock	2:46
5.	"Wipe Out"	The Surfaris	2:37
6.	"Purple Haze"	Jimi Hendrix	2:50
7.	"Nobody But Me"	The Human Beinz	2:14
8.	"Let the Sunshine In"	The 5th Dimension	2:30
9.	"Green Tambourine"	Robert Goulet	2:37
10.	"Recess Suite"	Denis M. Hannigan	5:08
11.	"Dancing in the Street"	Myra	3:56

== Home media ==
Recess: School's Out was released on VHS and DVD by Walt Disney Home Video on August 7, 2001. As of November 12, 2019, the film, along with the series, is available to stream on Disney+.

== Reception ==
=== Box office ===
The film earned $36.7 million in North America and another $7.8 million from other countries. The worldwide gross was $44.5 million, against a $23 million budget. The film was released in the United Kingdom on July 27, 2001, and opened on #7.

=== Critical response ===
On Rotten Tomatoes, a review aggregator, the film has an approval rating of 60% based on 68 reviews, with an average rating of 5.8/10. The site's critical consensus reads, "Though basically a television cartoon stretched out to movie length, Recess has enough successful jokes and smart writing to make it a worthwhile view." On Metacritic, the film has a weighted average score of 43 out of 100, based on 20 critics, indicating "mixed or average reviews". Audiences polled by CinemaScore gave the film an average grade of "A−" on an A+ to F scale.

Roger Ebert of the Chicago Sun-Times, gave the film a two and a half stars out of four, saying, "Parents may find it amusing, but it doesn't have the two track versatility of Rugrats in Paris, which worked for kids on one level, and adults on another." Bob McCabe of Empire, gave the film a one out of five stars and said, "Even if it did keep the ankle biters quiet for an hour or so, this still wouldn't be worth your money."

Common Sense Media gave the film two out of five stars and said: "Simply a TV episode blown up for the big screen."
