= Low-Light (G.I. Joe) =

Character in G.I. Joe

- G.I. Joe character
- Illustration of Low-Light from G.I. Joe: Order of Battle. Art by Herb Trimpe.
- First appearance: 1986
- Voiced by: Charlie Adler (Sunbow/Marvel); Maurice LaMarche (DiC)

In-universe information
- Affiliation: G.I. Joe
- Specialty: Infantryman; Night Spotter (1986, 1989); Night Fighter (1991); Dinosaur Night Spotter (1993); Night Survivalist (2001); Night Spotter (2006); S.W.A.T. Sharpshooter (2008); Night Spotter (2011)
- File name: MacBride, Cooper G.
- Birth place: Crosby, ND (1986); Crosby, NM (1993 only)
- Rank: E-6 (Staff Sergeant)
- Primary MOS: Infantry
- Secondary MOS: Marksmanship Instructor (1986); Sharpshooter (1991)
- Subgroups: Slaughter's Marauders

Low-Light (also released as Low Light) is a fictional character from the G.I. Joe: A Real American Hero toyline, comic books and animated series. He served as the G.I. Joe Team's Infantryman and debuted in 1986.

== Profile ==
His real name is Cooper G. MacBride, and his rank is that of Staff Sergeant E-6. Low-Light was born in Crosby, North Dakota.

As a child, Low-Light was afraid of the dark, timid with wild animals, and shy of loud noises, until one hunting expedition with his father. He lost his way in the impenetrable darkness, and was found three weeks later, with his flashlight, .22 rifle, and a grin from ear to ear. Ten years later, he was an instructor at the Army Marksmanship Program in Fort Benning and a self-taught expert on image intensification.

== Hasbro Toy ==
Low-Light was first released as an action figure in 1986. His accessories included a sniper rifle featuring a scope. Overall, he has had 8 releases, using a total of 5 unique molds. Just as his serial number has changed with each release, so has his actual appearance. For his original figure and 1989 repaint as part of the Slaughter's Marauders line, he was shown to have curly blond hair, with no facial hair.

For his third release (1991), he had short, straight, black hair, and a full beard. His fourth release (1993) as part of the Dino Hunters line was a repaint of his third release, and this time he had blond hair and beard. His fifth release was again a repaint of his third release, and again featured black hair and beard. His sixth (2006), seventh (2008), and eighth (2011) releases were done as a homage to his original release, as all three versions show him with blond hair and no beard. All versions include some visor (either red or blue) over his eyes.

== Comic books ==
=== Marvel Comics ===
Low-Light appears in issue #55 of the Marvel Comics G.I. Joe title. He is sent with a team of Joes to rescue Snake-Eyes from Cobra in Sierra Gordo. Low-Light is crucial to the rescue team's infiltration, using his sniper rifle to use shoot hypodermic darts to knockout cobra soldiers.

Low-Light is also featured in Marvel Comics Special Missions #11. He is one of a small group of G.I. Joe called in to help defuse a hostage situation in Frankfurt, Germany. He works under the command of Chuckles.

=== Devil's Due comics ===
In the Devil's Due 'Frontline' series, Low-Light makes a cameo during an investigation of the murder of a Crimson Guard. Low-Light is unsure as to why G.I. Joe should care, as evidence points to another Cobra agent as the killer.

Low-Light, Recondo, Ripcord, Dart and Tunnel Rat are caught in an artificial conflict created by Iron Grenadiers in the fictional country of Sierra Gordo. Low-Light is injured in a mortar explosion but makes it out alive.

Low-Light is also one of the reservists that is called into action in New York City to stop Neurotoxin. The team is successful in stopping Neurotixin, and Low-Light again shows off his night fighting ability. After this, he goes back into reserve status until World War III.

== Animated series ==
=== Sunbow ===
Low-Light appeared in the original G.I. Joe animated series. Low-Light in his first uniform appeared throughout the second season, and was voiced by Charlie Adler. In the series, he is depicted as being an extremely private person, avoiding conversations with his teammates and communicating with them only when necessary. He regularly suffers from nightmares and dislikes the dark. He wears his night vision goggles to keep him from having to see the night.

In "Glamour Girls", Low-Light, along with Dial-Tone, helps his model sister Una and her singer friend Satin move. Una and Satin attend a photo shoot they are invited to, though Low-Light believes it to be bogus, and go missing afterwards. Low-Light investigates the disappearance and is a part of a team of Joes led by Flint to rescue Cover Girl and Lady Jaye when they join Una and other female models as Cobra captives.

In "Nightmare Assault", it is hinted that abuse from his father might have played a role in his fear of the dark. In a dream, his father berates him for being afraid of the dark, and challenges him to kill rats. Low-Light defeats the giant cobras in his bad dream, resisting and overcoming his nightmare. Also in the episode, Doctor Mindbender inserts nightmares into the Joes' minds with a machine he invented, and the Joes realize that only Low-Light can help get rid of them. In a shared dream, Low-Light controls the nightmare with elements from his own nightmare, allowing the Joes to overcome theirs.

==== G.I. Joe: The Movie ====
Low-Light is shown in a few scenes of G.I. Joe: The Movie, but like many of the characters of the Sunbow cartoon, he has a very minor role. His most memorable part was serving as bailiff during Lt. Falcon's court-martial. He is glimpsed at the battle of the Statue of Liberty in the opening, and can be glimpsed during the battle of Cobra-La. He can be seen barely getting up from the ground after the explosive destruction of Cobra-La, as Doc calls Hawk regarding Duke's recovery.

=== DiC ===
Low-Light appears in his Slaughter's Marauders uniform, in the 1989 G.I. Joe mini-series "Operation: Dragonfire", voiced by Maurice LaMarche. Here, he is very suspicious of the journalist Scoop, whom he believes is a spy for Cobra. He is also part of the coup that overthrows Serpentor and allows Cobra Commander to regain control of Cobra. In later episodes, he began wearing his version 3 uniform.

== Novel ==
Low-Light appeared as a supporting character in The Sultan's Secret by Peter Lerangis and Fool's Gold by S.M. Ballard, two of six G.I. Joe tie-in novels published by Ballantine Books in 1988.
