= Recess (TV series) =

American animated television series

- Genre: Animated series; Comedy; Adventure; Coming of age
- Created by: Paul Germain; Joe Ansolabehere
- Showrunner: Paul Germain; Joe Ansolabehere
- Directed by: Chuck Sheetz (Note: Lead director for the first three seasons and "Recess: School's Out".); Howy Parkins (Note: Lead director for the fourth season and direct-to-video specials; supporting director for the second and third seasons.); Susie Dietter (Note: Supporting director for the first and second seasons.); Brenda Piluso (Note: Supporting director for the third season.)
- Voices of: Ross Malinger (seasons 1–2); Andrew Lawrence (seasons 2–4); Rickey D'Shon Collins; Ashley Johnson; Pamela Adlon; Jason Davis; Courtland Mead; April Winchell; Dabney Coleman; Allyce Beasley; Ryan O'Donohue; Erik von Detten
- Theme music composer: Randy Petersen; Kevin Quinn
- Composer: Denis M. Hannigan
- Country of origin: United States
- Original language: English
- No. of seasons: 4
- No. of episodes: 65 (127 segments) + 4 films (list of episodes)

Production
- Executive producer: Paul Germain; Joe Ansolabehere
- Producers: Chuck Sheetz (Note: Producer for the first and second seasons; credited as supervising producer for the second and third seasons.); Mark Drop (Note: Producer for the second season-onwards.)
- Running time: 21 minutes
- Production company: Walt Disney Television Animation; Paul & Joe Productions (specials)

Original release
- Network: ABC
- Release: September 13, 1997 – January 6, 2001
- Network: UPN
- Release: September 12, 1999 – July 17, 2000
- Release: October 31 – November 5, 2001

Recess is an American animated television series created by Paul Germain and Joe Ansolabehere (credited on marketing materials and late-series title cards as "Paul & Joe") and produced by Walt Disney Television Animation, with animation done by Grimsaem, Anivision, Plus One Animation, Sunwoo Animation, and Toon City. The series focuses on six elementary school students and their interaction with other classmates and teachers. The title refers to the recess period during the daily schedule, in the North American tradition of educational schooling, when students are not in lessons and are outside in the schoolyard. During recess, the children form their own society, complete with government and a class structure, set against the backdrop of a regular school.

Recess premiered on September 13, 1997, on ABC, as part of Disney's One Saturday Morning block (later known as ABC Kids). The series ended on November 5, 2001, with 65 half-hour episodes and four seasons in total. The success and lasting appeal of the series saw it being syndicated to numerous channels, including ABC's sister channels Disney Channel and Toon Disney (which later became Disney XD).

In 2001, Walt Disney Pictures released a theatrical film based on the series, Recess: School's Out. It was followed by a direct-to-video second film entitled Recess Christmas: Miracle on Third Street that same year. In 2003, two more direct-to-video films were released: Recess: All Growed Down and Recess: Taking the Fifth Grade. The characters made their final appearance in a crossover episode for Lilo & Stitch: The Series until Vince returned in an episode of Chibiverse.

== Overview ==
Recess portrays the lives of six fourth graders— mischievous and troublemaking lovable rogue Theodore Jasper "T.J." Detweiler (Ross Malinger, Andrew Lawrence), jock Vince LaSalle (Rickey D'Shon Collins), tomboy Ashley Spinelli (referred to by her last name) (Pamela Adlon), wise fool Mikey Blumberg (Jason Davis), nerdy child prodigy Gretchen Grundler (Ashley Johnson), and awkward new kid Gus Griswold (Courtland Mead)—as they go about their daily lives in a school environment at Third Street Elementary School. During recess, the children form their own society, complete with its own government, a class system, and set of unwritten laws set against the backdrop of a regular school. They are ruled by a monarch, a sixth grader named King Bob, who has various enforcers to make sure his decrees are carried out. The society has a long list of rigid values and social norms that imposes a high expectation of conformity upon all the students.

Recess is illustrated to be a symbol of liberty—a time when children can express themselves and develop meaningful relationships. Most episodes involve one or more of the main six characters seeking a rational balance between individuality and social order. They are often defending their freedom against perceived threats by adults and school administration or social norms. The group's leader, T.J. Detweiler, tends to have the most complete vision of this struggle, though even he has times when he inadvertently leads the group too far toward an extreme of conformity or non-conformity, and needs to be drawn back to even ground by his friends.

This interpretation is confirmed by the Cold War motifs found throughout the show. For example, Miss Grotke's philosophical and activist attitudes (attributed to her belonging to the counterculture of the 1960s) are juxtaposed with the authoritarian and conservative views of her colleagues such as Miss Finster and Principal Prickly. The presence of government officials either confiscating objects for national security (Episode 19-A, "The Substitute") or removing persons for challenging authority (Episode 29-B, "The Spy Who Came in from the Playground"), serve as subtle reminders on the authority of the US government. Several references by the show's characters convey the fraught political realities of the Cold War period. In Episode 40-B, "Here Comes Mr. Perfect", Randall suggests blackmailing a student for being a supposed Communist, while in Episode 19-A, "The Substitute", Mr. E demands a student write an essay on why it's wrong to bully people, "unless it's in the geopolitical interests of the United States". Cold War themes are most seen in Episode 51-A, "The Secret Life of Grotke", where Miss Grotke is suspected by the Recess gang as an anti-American spy due to her mysterious after-school life, as well as Episode 58-B, "The Army/Navy Game", where T.J. masquerades as a Soviet spy to bring Gus and Theresa's military fathers to reconcile.

The show's introductory music, art design and style often evoked the feel of prison escape movies such as The Great Escape, and the playground hierarchy and school administration were often depicted in ways that paid homage to common themes in such films.

== Cast and characters ==
=== Main characters ===
The main characters of the series. From left to right: Vince, Spinelli, Mikey, T.J., Gretchen and Gus.

- Theodore Jasper "T.J." Detweiler Jr. (voiced by Ross Malinger, Seasons 1–2; Andrew Lawrence, Seasons 2–4): T.J. is the main protagonist of the series, the leader of his five best friends, and usually spends time planning several pranks against the teachers. Rarely seen without his red baseball hat, which he always wears backwards, he uses his catchphrase "whomps" as a child-friendly substitute swear word for something unpleasant as well as "tender" whenever something good happens. While not excelling well in academics, T.J. has excellent leadership skills, confidence in public speaking, a quick wit and the ability to talk his way out of any situation, as shown in "Good Ole T.J.". Despite his precarious acts, T.J. is a hero, as he deeply cares about the well-being of his fellow peers at school, often rallying them and convincing them to work together to stand up for their rights. His only sibling is an older sister (around 17 or 18) named Becky, who was seen in Recess: School's Out (voiced by Melissa Joan Hart) and Recess: Taking the Fifth Grade (voiced by Tara Strong), although T.J. mentions an older brother in "The Great Jungle Gym Stand Off".
- Vincent "Vince" Pierre LaSalle (voiced by Rickey D'Shon Collins): Vince is the most physically fit student at Third Street School. Along with his superior athletic ability, he comes across as a bit of a "jock", but in the end he always knows to make the best choice to help others. His athletic/competitive skills are far superior, so much so that he seemingly excels at most, if not all, challenges, such as basketball, golf, cooking and even improvised playground games. He has a big rivalry with Erwin Lawson, a fifth grade jock school bully. He has an older brother named Chad whom he thinks is the coolest boy he knows, even if his peers see him as a geek. His catchphrase is "Whompinbobyulah!" to exclaim surprise. Respected and brave, he is T.J.'s right-hand man.
- Ashley Funicello Spinelli (voiced by Pamela Adlon): Usually going simply by her last name, Spinelli is a huge wrestling fan and the tomboy of the group. She is of Italian descent and although short in stature for her age, she maintains a very powerful tough-girl image, often attempting to solve her problems via violence. During the gang's misadventures, Spinelli is the one who gets reluctant kids to talk, usually by threatening or intimidating them during interrogation. With her reputation, a lot of Spinelli's problems happen when she is shown to have a weakness, as she prefers to be unflappable and strong-willed. While she doesn't dislike her first name since she was named after her great-aunt, the first woman to win the Iditarod Sled Race, she keeps it hidden to avoid being associated with "the Ashleys", the school's clique of snobby girls. She has a talent for art, though she claims she "only does it to blow off steam". Her fiery and fearless personality has gotten on the good side of Miss Finster multiple times as well as her bad side. It is revealed on Parent-Teacher Night, by Spinelli's mother, that Spinelli has a crush on T.J.
- Gretchen Priscilla Grundler (voiced by Ashley Johnson): Gretchen is an academically gifted and an extremely intelligent student. A child prodigy, she has shown the ability for academic feats that other students in her grade find difficult. She is still a young kid at heart and her imagination sometimes overwhelms her a lot, as she is quite naive despite her high IQ. She is occasionally assisted by an interactive, calculator-sized, hand-held computer-like machine called Galileo (voiced by Eric Idle), which she is very protective of. Though her friends don't share her passion for science, Gretchen considers the gang much more important than finding intellectual colleagues. She also has a unique talent with yo-yos. She was called "the doughy queen of beauty" by Frank "Tiny" Sedgwick in "Lord of the Nerds".
- Michael "Mikey" Blumberg (voiced by Jason Davis; singing voiced by Robert Goulet): Overweight, kind-hearted, and philosophical, Mikey writes poetry, performs ballet, and believes in notions of peace that the others often dismiss. Though known as a "sweet-souled giant", he is also an incredibly talented singer, possessing a baritone voice that contrasts starkly with his normal speaking voice. He is quite good at playing goalie in soccer due to his towering height and body power.
- Gustav Patton "Gus" Griswold (Note: Also referred to as Gus Griswald in certain episodes; "One Stayed Clean," "A Great State Fair" and "All Growed Down" only) (voiced by Courtland Mead): Gus is a new student at Third Street Elementary with a blonde crew cut; though absent in the first episode, he was introduced in the following episode as "The New Kid". Gus is usually quite oblivious to the rules of the playground and its traditions, as he comes from a military family, and therefore has had to move around very frequently (he has attended 12 schools in six years, but according to the movie/episode All Grown Down, he briefly attended Third Street School for a few days in kindergarten, prior to his return for fourth grade). Although normally very shy and meek, he has great leadership abilities similar to T.J.'s when faced with danger. He is exceptionally skilled in dodgeball, and was once feared at Jesse James Elementary School, a previous school of his, as "El Diablo"; however, as shown in "Dodgeball City", when he accidentally hit a little boy hard in the face, greatly traumatizing the kid, he stopped playing it in much shame. In this same episode, he shows he doesn't care for marbles too much, either because of dodgeball or his dislike towards them. Gus is both brave and swallows his pride when he addresses certain situations. Even though everyone sees him as a pushover, he has repeatedly proven otherwise; for instance, he stood up to Gelman the school bully in "Gus' Last Stand", and in "All Grown Down", it was revealed that during his brief attendance at Third Street as a kindergartner, he helped overthrow Randall's manipulation of Mikey (who believed he was being taunted), which was confirmed by Finster apparently bearing a grudge towards him at the end of the film.

=== School staff ===
- Muriel Periwinkle Finster (voiced by April Winchell): Miss Finster is an elderly assistant teacher who monitors the students during lunch, recess, and in the halls. She is an assertive authoritarian feared by the students, and seeks to keep them in line and maintain order, with her assistant Randall Weems reporting to her on any wrongdoing. She was a Navy commodore in the 1950s, frequently reminiscing her time in Guam, and has worked at Third Street since the 1960s. Though she is often at much odds with the students, Finster has been shown to genuinely care about their safety. In a few of the series' episodes and in the film Recess: School's Out, she is revealed as having been attractive and popular when she was young, but eventually became a very strict, serious, grouchy, irritated and fussy figure as she grew older. She becomes the gang's fifth grade teacher in the film Recess: Taking the Fifth Grade. In the film Recess: All Growed Down it is revealed that she was the gang's kindergarten teacher and she was initially very pleasant, but became quite hot-tempered and intimidating after seeing her kindergarten students all messy and having fun during recess. In "That Stinking Feeling", it is implied that she was once in a relationship with someone in her younger years when she tells Spinelli, "Even if he does leave you in Paris with no money and a broken axel on the VW the end, love is all worth it despite the fact that she will end up having feelings that will want to make her stand on a rooftop and yell to the heaven and crawl into a hole and pull off her skin."
- Principal Peter Prickly (voiced by Dabney Coleman): Principal Prickly is the principal of Third Street School. A former student at the school, he became a teacher out of a desire to help children and has been principal of Third Street since 1968. He is frequently quickly angered by the children's antics, and ultimately seeks to become principal of Spiro T. Agnew Junior High. He has a strong rivalry with his older brother Paul, who is also a school principal. While frequently portrayed as a heartless authority figure, Prickly has been shown to have a more friendly, laid-back personality and ultimately tries to protect the student's welfare. He is also a secret fan of Señor Fusion, a comic book hero.
- Miss Alordayne Grotke (voiced by Allyce Beasley) is the 4th grade teacher of the main cast. She is known for her mild-mannered, yet eccentric personality, basically being that of a hippie, including her vocabulary. She is well loved by her students, especially for her tendency to stick up for their rights and encourages them to express themselves. Her dialogue establishes her as an advocate for the environment and race/gender rights. She also moonlights as a magician.

=== School students ===
- Randall Weems (voiced by Ryan O'Donohue) is a fourth grade student at the school. His hair cut and color (a reddish/brown perm curly style) resembles his father's. Well known as the playground snitch, informing Miss Finster of any playground misbehavior, he is consequently disliked on the playground, but will ally with his classmates if the situation calls for it. In "All Grown Down", it is revealed he hatched a plan to get Mikey on his side by gossiping about the other kids to Mikey. Mikey assumes this is true and believes that the other kids are making fun of him. However, Gus destroys his plans before he could succeed in possibly becoming king in 6th grade.
- Erwin Lawson (voiced by Erik von Detten) is a fifth grader. He is primarily a bully to the younger students and serves as a big rival to Vince and T.J. at various sports and games. He is portrayed as unintelligent. In the episode "Nobody Doesn't Like TJ", Lawson can even admit that T.J.'s still a pretty alright guy.
- King Robert "Bob" (voiced by Toran Caudell) is a sixth grader and the "King of the Playground". He enforces the unwritten rules of the playground established by other previous playground kings and acts as the primary authority of playground disputes. He was previously a renowned playground prankster, holding the title of "Prankster Prince" before becoming King. He has bequeathed the title to T.J. He is also incredibly respectful and reminiscent of previous playground kings, which can be seen in episodes such as "Pharaoh Bob" and "The Rules". In School's Out, upon graduating to the seventh grade, and leaving the school, Bob passes the role of "King" onto a boy named Freddy, whom he dubs "King Freddy the Second".
- The Ashleys are a group of four girls (Ashley Armbruster (voiced by Anndi McAfee), Boulet (voiced by Francesca Marie Smith), Quinlan (voiced by Rachel Crane), and Tomassian (voiced by Camille Winbush) who usually go by Ashley A, B, Q, and T respectively. The girls, while usually acting like the stereotypical popular girl clique, including being well-off and obsessing with fashion and beauty, often put down others either verbally or through a variety of underhanded schemes, resulting in them being seldom popular with anybody except during their occasional moments of kindness. They are even ostracized by many of their classmates (though they do maintain an air of superiority). They have a mutual despisement with Spinelli, due mainly to her first name being Ashley and her outright refusal to join their group as well as her frequent hostility towards them. Their catchphrase is saying "Ooh, scandalous!" as well as constantly using the preposition like in unison. They each have a little brother named Tyler who are collectively known as "The Tylers", and a little sister named Brittany who are collectively known as "The Brittanys". The Ashleys are probably based on the titular characters from the 1988 film Heathers, though their fashion obsessions and mannerisms seem to be based on the main characters from the 1995 film Clueless.
- Hustler Kid (voiced by Michael Shulman) is the playground's supplier of contraband goods and other valuable merchandise for the right price. In "Hustler's Apprentice", he is revealed to be part of an association of hustlers from every school and his real name is revealed to be Francis.
- Guru Kid (voiced by Klee Bragger and Ross Malinger in the series, and Ryan O'Donohue in Recess: School's Out) is the source of spiritual advice for the other students. He always sits in a meditative pose with his shirt wrapped around his head like a turban.
- Swinger Girl (voiced by Francesca Marie Smith) is, as her name suggests, a girl who is always at the swing set and whose ultimate goal is to swing over the top of the swing set. She dresses like a WWII fighter pilot.
- Upside Down Girl (also voiced by Francesca Marie Smith) spends her time hanging upside down from the jungle gym. In "The Great Jungle Gym Standoff", it is revealed her real name is Laura Jameson.
- Menlo (voiced by Blake McIver Ewing) is a student who works as an office aide to the school secretary Miss Lemon and is quite obsessed with organization. He was once good friends with T.J. before they drifted apart, but T.J. still attends Menlo's birthday parties in honor of that old friendship.
- Megan (voiced by Pamela Adlon in "The New Kid", Kath Soucie in "Call Me Guy", Anndi McAfee in "The Candidates", and Danielle Judovits in Recess: School's Out), a girl with brown hair in pigtails, and wears a red jacket (like T.J.) appears as a background character, though she only occasionally speaks. Not very much is known about her, but she is seen hanging with several other background girls.
- The Diggers (voiced by Ryan O'Donohue and Klee Bragger) are a pair of kids who spend their time at recess digging holes in the dirt and are dressed as miners. One is named Dave and the other is named Sam, and despite looking alike they aren't related to each other.
- Kristen Kurst (voiced by Mayim Bialik), "Kurst the Worst", is a gluttonous and very messy fifth grade girl bully who often times can be found stealing food from the cafeteria. She once befriended Mikey over their shared love of desserts.
- Cornchip Girl (voiced by Anndi McAfee, Francesca Marie Smith, Ashley Johnson, Elizabeth Daily, and Aria Curzon), whose real name is Theresa Laverne LaMaise, is a very sweet and polite little girl in the first grade, known for throwing corn chips to mark the arrival of King Bob at events, as well as collecting interesting-looking corn chips. Her father is in the Navy.
- Butch (voiced by Kath Soucie) is a fifth grade boy who often times pops up to tell the kids about his bad experiences, with T.J. almost always prompting Butch's stories with the words, "What're you talking about, Butch?" He wears a leather jacket and has a white streak in his hair.
- Gelman (voiced by Justin Shenkarow) is the biggest school bully, and picks on kids that are smaller than him (most notably Gus). Gelman is overweight, lazy and very mean and impolite; he normally sports a black T-shirt, dark gray pants and light brown hair.
- Singing Kid (voiced by Michael Shulman), real name Brandon, is the school's official singer. He usually speaks in a sing song voice rather than regular speaking.

== Production ==
Recess was intended to first air on ABC on August 31, 1997, as a "sneak preview", and then premiere on ABC's Disney's One Saturday Morning programming block, premiering on September 6, 1997. However, both of these airings were pulled in accordance with the death of Princess Diana. The series would premiere on September 13, the week ahead of its intended premiere. The series' success spawned three direct-to-video titles Recess Trilogy: Recess Christmas: Miracle on Third Street in 2001, Recess: Taking the Fifth Grade and Recess: All Growed Down in 2003; and one theatrical film, Recess: School's Out, which was released on February 16, 2001. The series ended on November 5, 2001; reruns continued to air on UPN until 2003 and ABC until 2004.

Disney Channel added Recess to their lineup on September 6, 2003. Fillmore!, The Legend of Tarzan, and Buzz Lightyear of Star Command were all pre-empted in favor of a 90-minute showing of the series. It temporarily ceased airing on September 2, 2005, but resumed on August 26, 2008 replacing The Buzz on Maggie, and continued until June 30, 2010.

Toon Disney aired the show from September 1, 2003 to February 12, 2009. When Toon Disney was converted to Disney XD, the series was carried over and aired from April 14, 2009 to October 27, 2011.

The creators were credited by their first names only due to concerns by Disney to not put their full names on the series as not to overshadow Walt Disney's name.

== Episodes ==
Season	Segments	Episodes		Originally released		
Season	Segments	Episodes		First released	Last released	Network
1	26	13		September 13, 1997	January 17, 1998	ABC
2	25	13		September 12, 1998	February 27, 1999	ABC
3	52	26		September 11, 1999	February 27, 2000	ABC; UPN
4	24	13		February 29, 2000	November 5, 2001	ABC; UPN
Films	N/A	4	1	February 16, 2001		Theatrical release
Films	N/A	4	3	November 6, 2001	December 9, 2003	Direct-to-video
Special				January 16, 2006		Disney Channel

=== Crossover with Lilo & Stitch ===
Lilo & Stitch: The Series featured an episode titled "Lax" that featured the cast of Recess, when T.J. and the gang go on a school vacation to Hawaii. Notably, Recess was the only series that crossed over with Lilo & Stitch: The Series that was not a Disney Channel Original Series, and whose production had already ended before Lilo & Stitch: The Series first aired.

Disaster strikes when Dr. Hämsterviel and his henchman, Gantu, try to use an escaped alien experiment to make everyone relaxed while he takes over the world. Luckily, Gretchen saves the day, since she believes work is relaxing.

== Films ==
=== Recess: School's Out ===
Recess: School's Out is an animated film directed by Chuck Sheetz and is based on the television series where the characters must intercept a gang of anti-recess terrorists plotting to bring about a new ice age to eliminate the institution of summer vacation. The film was produced by Walt Disney Pictures and was released theatrically nationwide on February 16, 2001.

=== Recess Christmas: Miracle on Third Street ===
Recess Christmas: Miracle on Third Street is a second direct-to-video animated film released by Walt Disney Pictures and Paul & Joe Productions, produced by Walt Disney Television Animation, Plus One Animation (Korea) Co., Ltd. and Grimsaem Animation, Korea Co., Ltd., released to VHS and DVD on November 6, 2001 by Walt Disney Home Video. The film is a direct-to-video compilation of four unrelated episodes: "Principal for a Day", "The Great Can Drive", "Weekend at Muriel's", and the series' Christmas special "Yes, Mikey, Santa Does Shave", told as flashbacks by the school faculty members while stuck in a snowstorm. The video includes the voice talents of Dick Clark, Robert Goulet and James Earl Jones as well as many of the series regulars.

=== Recess: All Growed Down ===
Recess: All Growed Down is a Disney direct-to-video animated film released on December 9, 2003. After being kidnapped by kindergarteners, the main characters recall stories about how they used to get along with each other. It is a compilation of the episodes "The Legend of Big Kid", "Wild Child", and "The Kindergarten Derby", plus a new story showing the main characters as kindergarteners.

=== Recess: Taking the Fifth Grade ===
Recess: Taking the Fifth Grade (also known as Recess: Taking the 5th Grade) is a 59-minute Disney direct-to-video animated film released on December 9, 2003. It is a compilation of "No More School", "Grade Five Club", and "A Recess Halloween", three new stories that involve the main characters in fifth grade. The film serves as the series finale and the sequel to Recess: School's Out.

== Home media ==
=== DVD ===
Title	Episode count	Release date	Episodes include		
Title	Episode count	Region 1	Season	Ep#	Title
School's Out	1	August 7, 2001	—N/a	M1	School's Out
Miracle on Third Street	5	November 6, 2001	DTV	M2	Miracle on Third Street
Miracle on Third Street	5	November 6, 2001	1	22	"The Great Can Drive"
Miracle on Third Street	5	November 6, 2001	2	44	"Weekend at Muriel's"
Miracle on Third Street	5	November 6, 2001	2	47	"Yes Mikey, Santa Does Shave"
Miracle on Third Street	5	November 6, 2001	2	50	"Principal for a Day"
All Growed Down	8	December 9, 2003	DTV	M3	All Growed Down
All Growed Down	8	December 9, 2003	DTV	M3	"Chief Mikey"
All Growed Down	8	December 9, 2003	1	16	"The Legend of Big Kid"
All Growed Down	8	December 9, 2003	2	35	"The Challenge"
All Growed Down	8	December 9, 2003	2	36	"Wild Child"
All Growed Down	8	December 9, 2003	2	43	"The Story of Whomps"
All Growed Down	8	December 9, 2003	3	64	"One Stayed Clean"
All Growed Down	8	December 9, 2003	3	54	"Kindergarten Derby"
Taking the Fifth Grade	6	December 9, 2003	DTV	M4	Taking the Fifth Grade
Taking the Fifth Grade	6	December 9, 2003	DTV	M4	"No More School"
Taking the Fifth Grade	6	December 9, 2003	DTV	M4	"Grade Five Club"
Taking the Fifth Grade	6	December 9, 2003	DTV	M4	"A Recess Halloween"
Taking the Fifth Grade	6	December 9, 2003	1	1	"The Break In"
Taking the Fifth Grade	6	December 9, 2003	1	2	"The New Kid"

=== Video-on-demand ===
Every episode of Recess is available on Disney+ in several countries, including the US, along with most of the direct-to-video films. Similarly to Pepper Ann, the third and fourth seasons are paired together on the site, and are currently listed out of order.

== Critical reception ==
Television critics Alan Sepinwall and Matt Zoller Seitz wrote favorably about Recess in their 2016 book TV (The Book), stating that the series is "Easily one of the smartest, most prankishly playful adult cartoons ever passed off as children's entertainment.... Recess is a highly ritualized bit of entertainment that strikes the same notes over and over again, but always in infinite variation and with a surprising eye for psychological grace notes, especially when characters you thought of as brusque and one-dimensional reveal their fears and dreams to one another."

== Scrapped sequel series ==
In 2022, Joe Ansolabehere revealed that he and Paul Germain had been working on a potential revival stating, "We've come up with several different angles and we've tried different things. It's been four years that we've been working on it, but that's an example of how things have changed... things are slower." An early bible for the sequel series was leaked in June 2024 detailing that the project would take place 20 years after the events of the original sequel series following Spinelli and Vince's daughter Ruby and her gang at the Third Street Elementary School now ran by Randall. In January 2026, Germain and Ansolabehere confirmed that the project got scrapped by Disney Kids & Family due "political reasons".
