= Grimsaem =

1997–2000 South Korean animation studio

Grimsaem Animation Co. Ltd., Seoul, Korea (주)그림샘 애니메이션
- Company type: Private
- Industry: Overseas animation
- Founded: Seoul, South Korea (March 1997)
- Defunct: April 2000
- Fate: Merger with Sunwoo Animation Co., Inc.
- Headquarters: Seoul, South Korea
- Area served: South Korea
- Key people: Kang Han Young (Sunwoo Animation Co., Inc.)
- Products: Family Guy; Rugrats
- Parent: Sunwoo Animation Co., Inc.
- Website: sunwoo.com

Grimsaem Animation Co. Ltd., Seoul, Korea ((주)그림샘 애니메이션) was an animation studio located in South Korea. It is a division of Sunwoo Entertainment. Grimsaem created feature-length work for Nickelodeon, and has worked on the Fox TV series Family Guy, animating the full first and third seasons of the show.

== Information ==
Grimsaem is also known as Sunwoo Entertainment due to being spun off of the Sunwoo after years of success. The company was established in the year of 1979, and it is known to be a South Korean animation studio. It is claimed that the studio had been around since the year of 1974 though. They began by working with South Korean productions, but they eventually moved to work with Disney about ten years later. Now they are considered to be one of the more popular overseas animation studios. Once Sunwoo became successful, the new and different companies that were born from it included Anivision, Sunwoo Digital, and of course Grimseam. In addition to working along with Disney, Sunwoo and its smaller studios have also worked for Universal, Cookie Jar Entertainment, 20th Century Fox, and Nickelodeon in the years following. In the year of 2000, all of the companies that were broken away from Sunwoo ended back up in the Sunwoo Entertainment studio.

== Partial list of animated features ==
- Family Guy (overseas animation production)
- Recess (animation production)
- The Rugrats Movie (animation production)
- Rugrats in Paris: The Movie (animation production)
- The Wild Thornberrys Movie (overseas animation studio)
- Rugrats Go Wild (overseas animation studio)
- The Wacky Adventures of Ronald McDonald (overseas animation facility)
