= YouTube Studio =

YouTube's content creator dashboard

- Screenshot of the home page of YouTube Studio
- Website type: Dashboard
- Owner: YouTube
- Website: studio.youtube.com
- Commercial: Yes
- Registration: Required
- Launched: 2005
- Current status: Active
- Content license: Proprietary

YouTube Studio, formerly known as YouTube Creator Studio, is a platform created by the American video-sharing platform YouTube. YouTube Studio enables content creators to manage their online presence on YouTube, analyze audience engagement and generate revenue if they are in the YouTube Partner Program.

== History ==
In 2005, YouTube introduced Creator Studio Classic. In 2019, a significant overhaul of YouTube Studio was conducted to align with Google's Material Design user interface.

By November 2019, Creator Studio Classic access was gradually phased out in favor of the rebranded "YouTube Studio," serving as a replacement for around 150,000 creators. The impact expanded from 1% of YouTube channels in January 2020 to 100% by April 2020.

== Features ==
YouTube Studio offers features for creators to manage their own channels, including a dashboard for news and personal notifications, general management of one's own videos on the platform, channel analytics, monetization and copyright management, and other resources and tools for channel customization.
