= Klasky Csupo =

American animation studio

Klasky Csupo, Inc.
- Logo used since 1996
- Formerly: Klasky & Csupo (legal name, 1982-1991)
- Type: Private
- Industry: Animation
- Founded: 1982; 44 years ago (original); 2012; 14 years ago (current)
- Founders: Arlene Klasky; Gábor Csupó
- Defunct: 2008; 18 years ago (original)
- Fate: Dormancy (original)
- Headquarters: 1238 North Highland Avenue; Los Angeles, California; 90038
- Key people: Terry Thoren (CEO, 1994–2006); Tracy Kramer; Norton Virgien; Brandon Scott (vice president)
- Products: Animated series; Music videos; Animated shorts; Animated commercials; Comic books; Live-action shows; Animes
- Owners: Arlene Klasky; Gábor Csupó
- Website: klaskycsupo.com

Klasky Csupo, Inc. (/klæski ˈtʃuːpoʊ/ KLAS-kee CHOO-poh) is an American animation studio located in Los Angeles, California. It was founded in 1982 by producer Arlene Klasky and her then-husband, Hungarian animator Gábor Csupó, in a spare room of their apartment and grew to 550 artists, creative workers and staff in an animation facility in Hollywood.

During the 1990s and 2000s, they produced and animated shows for the children's network Nickelodeon, such as Rugrats (which was one of the channel's first three Nicktoons), Aaahh!!! Real Monsters, The Wild Thornberrys, Rocket Power, As Told by Ginger, All Grown Up!, and the American dub of Poppy Cat. They also animated the first three seasons of The Simpsons, as well as Duckman. By 2007, Nickelodeon ended their long-running partnership with Klasky Csupo and its shows were cancelled, resulting in the company becoming dormant for five years. In 2018, it began production on a CGI-animated reboot of Rugrats, which premiered in 2021 on Paramount+.

== History ==
=== Early years (1982–1989) ===
Klasky Csupo, Inc., was established in 1982. It was founded in the spare bedroom of a Hollywood apartment where Arlene Klasky and Gábor Csupó were living during their marriage. One year later, Klasky Csupo expanded and moved to a new location at 729 Seward Street (which had been Bob Clampett's studio), opening its first facility in Hollywood.

Klasky Csupo was initially distinguished by its work on logo designs, commercials, feature film trailers, television show titles, promos and ident spots for a wide variety of clients, in the process earning a reputation as the industry's most imaginative and innovative studio. Building on its success, the studio left Seward Street to open its second facility in Hollywood in 1988, at the corner of Fountain and Highland Avenues. The studio soon grew to include six buildings that have become well known in Hollywood, in true Klasky Csupo style, the exterior walls of the buildings are decorated with large murals of its characters.

The studio's first big break came in 1987 when James L. Brooks of Gracie Films commissioned the studio to produce the title sequence for a comedy series titled The Tracey Ullman Show. In addition to the main title, Klasky Csupo was given the opportunity to produce and animate a new series of one-minute cartoons which featured a family called the Simpsons, created by Matt Groening. Klasky Csupo produced and animated all 48 shorts, and when it became one of the most popular segments on the show, Fox began airing a weekly half-hour series entitled The Simpsons. Klasky Csupo oversaw and animated every episode of the first three seasons of the series, resulting in the studio sharing the 1989–1990 and 1990–1991 Primetime Emmy Award for Outstanding Animated Program, with Gracie Films.

In addition, Klasky Csupo produced the music video for "Do the Bartman". Klasky Csupo animator and colorist "Georgie" Gyorgyi Kovacs Peluce (Kovács Györgyike) conceived the idea of The Simpsons characters having yellow skin, and Marge Simpson having blue hair, opting for something which "didn't look like anything that had come before." Klasky Csupo was also responsible for an error during the episode "Homer's Odyssey", in which Waylon Smithers was colorized as black with blue hair.

In 1992, Gracie Films switched domestic production of The Simpsons to Film Roman, which continued until 2016. Csupó was "asked [by Gracie Films] if they could bring in their own producer [to oversee the animation production]," but declined, stating "they wanted to tell me how to run my business." Sharon Bernstein of The Los Angeles Times wrote that "Gracie executives had been unhappy with the producer Csupo had assigned to The Simpsons and said the company also hoped to obtain better wages and working conditions for animators at Film Roman." Of the 110 people he employed to animate The Simpsons, Csupó fired 75.

=== Success with animated series (1989–2005) ===
In 1989, Klasky Csupo created Rugrats. Premiering on Nickelodeon in 1991 as one of the first animated shows for the network (known as "Nicktoons"), it was inspired by the couple's two sons and the idea of what they would do if they could speak. Their next major series was Duckman for the USA Network, which revolved around the home life and adventures of a dim-witted and lascivious private detective duck named Eric Duckman. The series ran from 1994 to 1997. During the same time, Klasky Csupo's second Nicktoon, Aaahh!!! Real Monsters premiered and Klasky Csupo originally ended production on Rugrats due to the network's since-outdated 65-episode rule. However, with continued success of Rugrats reruns, it exploded in popularity with high ratings and increasing advertising deals, prompting Nickelodeon and Klasky Csupo to resume production on the series. The show was cited as "a show like the Simpsons, but for children".

In 1993, Klasky Csupo partnered with comedian Lily Tomlin and her partner Jane Wagner to bring the irascible little girl, Edith Ann, to television in two half-hour animated specials for ABC. The first special, A Few Pieces of the Puzzle, aired in January 1994, while the second, Homeless Go Home, aired in May 1994, with both immediately receiving critical acclaim.

Subsequently, the studio created Santo Bugito. Premiering on CBS in 1995, Santo Bugito tells the story of a small town of 64 million insects located on the border of Texas and Mexico. Music-driven and Latin-influenced, the series stars Cheech Marin, Joan Van Ark, Tony Plana, William Sanderson, George Kennedy, Marabina Jaimes, and David Paymer, and is highlighted by a distinctive look and the music of Mark Mothersbaugh, the Devo keyboardist who also composed the music of Rugrats.

Also in 1995, Klasky Csupo established Klasky Csupo Commercials (rebranded as Class-Key Chew-Po Commercials in 1998), founded by John Andrews, in order to continue the successful animated commercial business that had grown from its initial work in main titles and graphics. Class-Key Chew-Po had been an immediate success, building an impressive client list with work for companies such as 1-800-COLLECT, Oscar Mayer, Taco Bell, Kraft, and Nickelodeon. In 2001, the company founded Ka-Chew!, a live-action commercial division.

The company was also active in producing recorded music, having formed the record labels Tone Casualties and Casual Tonalities. Gabor Csupo was a good friend of Frank Zappa and occasionally collaborated with Mark Mothersbaugh. In 1996, the company expanded its production deal with MTV Networks, in which it would develop many animation properties for other networks MTV Networks owned at the time. Following the cancellation of Duckman and AAAHH!!! Real Monsters in 1997, Klasky Csupo began producing The Wild Thornberrys for Nickelodeon, which premiered the following year; the story revolved around a girl named Eliza Thornberry who could talk to animals.

In 1998, Klasky Csupo produced its first feature-length film, The Rugrats Movie, which was released in the United States on November 20. It immediately became the #1 film in the country and grossed $141 million worldwide, becoming the first non-Disney animated film to gross over $100 million in the United States. It was then followed by two sequels, Rugrats in Paris: The Movie (2000) and Rugrats Go Wild (2003), the latter of which was a crossover with The Wild Thornberrys. The Wild Thornberrys also had its own feature-length film, released in 2002.

Also in 1998, Klasky Csupo was commissioned by McDonald's to develop The Wacky Adventures of Ronald McDonald, a series of six animated videos featuring the company's mascot, Ronald McDonald, which were released exclusively on VHS. The tapes were distributed directly to consumers via participating McDonald's restaurants. On December 23, 1998, CEO Terry Thoren concluded an eleven-month negotiation with automotive supplier Mercedes-Benz and moved the company into a state-of-the-art studio in Los Angeles.

In the late 1990s and early 2000s, Klasky Csupo produced two more shows for Nickelodeon: Rocket Power and As Told by Ginger. They also produced the first season of Stressed Eric, which was BBC Two's first adult-oriented animated series.

Subsequently, in honor of the tenth anniversary of Rugrats, Klasky Csupo produced a two-part television special entitled All Growed Up. Premiering on Nickelodeon in 2001, it featured all of the titular babies as tweens. It became the most-watched broadcast on the network; in response, the network commissioned a full series based on that special, titled All Grown Up!, which ran on the network from 2003 to 2008. On September 29, 2001, Class-Key Chew-Po signed animation director Chris Prynoski and his company Titmouse, Inc. for commercial representation.

In 2003, Klasky Csupo and Titmouse, Inc. were commissioned by Cartoon Network to produce a music video for the song "Dee Dee and Dexter" by the band They Might Be Giants, which features characters from Dexter's Laboratory drawn by the studio in anime style. Class-Key Chew-Po Animated Commercials and Broadcast Design were subsequently folded into Ka-Chew! the following year.

Also in 2003, the studio began work on The Way the Dead Love, a theatrical film that was set to adapt seven short stories from German-American writer Charles Bukowski from a script penned by Bruce Wagner. The film was developed under the studio's Global Tantrum division, with Winchester Films joining to co-produce the film with the studio, as well as providing sales for the film. It was to be directed by Igor Kovalyov and Laslo Nosek, with Radiohead and Peter Gabriel set to compose the feature. Slated for a 2006 release, it was eventually postponed. The project was then revived that same year at Warner Independent Pictures, with Johnny Depp set to co-produce and serve as the voice of the film's main character. However, the project would be canceled. Had it been completed, the film would have been the first R-rated feature from the studio.

In 2005, Ka-Chew! worked for Cartoon Network on the shorts Oogloo + Anju, Food Court Diaries, and The Topside Rag for Sunday Pants.

=== Decline and dormancy (2006–2008) ===
In the mid-2000s, Klasky Csupo's Nickelodeon shows were cancelled and their long-running partnership soon ended. In 2006, the longtime CEO of the company, Terry Thoren, left the studio and they dissolved the remainder of their 401(k) program, leading them to a period of dormancy and inactivity.

In fall 2006, Klasky Csupo announced the development of 28 new animated cartoon pilots that were to be up for sale at a later date. Each pilot was animated in different designs, instead of the typical style the studio was famous for. Some of the cartoons were never ordered to series. Gabor Csupo would later post the remains of the cartoons on his YouTube channel. One of the pilots, Chicken Town, was announced as a series by French company Ellipsanime, though Klasky Csupo was not involved with it.

In 2007, Paul Demeyer left Klasky Csupo to found Wild Canary, taking some of Ka-Chew!'s clients with him. In 2008, Ka-Chew! celebrated its 10th anniversary by expanding its roster of directors, before being absorbed into 6 Point Media in April 2011. In the same year, the studio released its final film to date, Immigrants, which was originally produced as an unaired animated series for Spike TV.

=== Return of the company with new projects (2012–present) ===
In 2012, Arlene Klasky and Gabor Csupo reopened the company after nearly four years of dormancy. Along with Craig Singer, the studio created its first new project in four years, Ollie Mongo, a digital comic book about a teenage skateboarding zombie who lives 200 years in the future. In 2015, the company announced that they were working on RoboSplaat!, a web series featuring the character with a robotic voice from their 1998 on-screen logo, given the name "Splaat" (voiced by Greg Cipes). The logo featuring him was discontinued over a year before the company originally went dormant, but was revived in 2021, along with the premiere of the Rugrats revival; the logo continues to appear on productions from the company. The web series premiered on December 21, 2016, and an app based on the web series is also currently in development. That same year, Klasky Csupo also announced that they were working on some "top secret projects".

On September 2, 2015, it was announced that Nickelodeon may "seek to experiment with retooled versions of classics" that could include Rugrats. The following day, The Independent announced that Klasky Csupo were in talks of a Rugrats revival. At San Diego Comic-Con in 2016, Arlene Klasky explained that she would be willing to work on a revival of the series along with co-creators Gábor Csupó and Paul Germain.

On July 16, 2018, Nickelodeon announced a revival of Rugrats consisting of a 26-episode order. Arlene Klasky and Gábor Csupó would return as executive producers for the revived series. Using CGI animation rather than traditional hand-drawn animation used in the original series, the new Rugrats premiered on Paramount+, the streaming service for Nickelodeon parent Paramount Global, on May 27, 2021.

In April 2022, Gabor Csupo launched an NFT project titled Cosa Monstra.

On September 17, 2024, the original Klasky Csupo building closed its doors after Klasky retired from working in the animation industry with plans to relocate under the management of her son, Brandon.

== RoboSplaat! ==
RoboSplaat! is an American animated web series created by Arlene Klasky for YouTube. The series is about Splaat, an ink splat, who is voiced by Greg Cipes, who also voiced Beast Boy from Teen Titans.

=== RoboSplaat! characters ===
==== Splaat ====
- Splaat (voiced by Greg Cipes) is the main character in the series. He is a purple ink splat with two weird yellow rectangles, the upper has blue eyes, while the lower has a mouth with red lips. He wears black long sleeves and red and white sneakers, each with a white shoelace tied. He also appeared in the Klasky Csupo logo, albeit with no limbs, a more realistic look, a robotic voice, and his ink splat is black on a blue background. Prior to 2012, he was commonly referred to as a robot, before it was revealed that he is a "splaat".

==== Splaat's family ====
- Digital (voiced by Debi Derryberry) is Splaat's 12-year-old younger brother. Unlike Splaat, the rectangles are red instead of yellow, his lips are blue instead of red, and wears a black short-sleeved shirt with a white sound shape and grey and white shoes, each with a black shoelace tied.
- Sergei (voiced by Cooper Barnes) is the father of Splaat and Digital and the husband of Blossom. He is an ink bottle with sea-green eyes and pink lips. He wears purplish black armless sleeves and black shoes.
- Blossom (voiced by Candi Milo) is the mother of Splaat and Digital, the wife of Sergei, and the only female and legless member of Splaat's family. She is a pair of blue scissors with blue eyes and a weird yellow rectangle that has a mouth with red lips. She wears an orange skirt and gloves.
- Grandpa (voiced by Richard Tanner) is the grandfather of Splaat and Digital and the father of Sergei. He is a grey ink splat with blue eyes and black eyebrows and wears green glasses, a black suit with a green shirt and a purple necktie, and brown shoes.

== Filmography ==
=== Television series ===
Show	Creator(s)	Network(s)	Year(s)	Co-production(s)	Notes
The Simpsons	Matt Groening	Fox	1989–1992	Gracie Films; 20th Television Animation	Seasons 1–3 only
Rugrats (1991)	Arlene Klasky; Gábor Csupó; Paul Germain	Nickelodeon	1991–2006	Nickelodeon	
Duckman	Everett Peck	USA Network	1994–1997	Reno & Osborn Productions; Paramount Television	Based on the comics of the same name
Aaahh!!! Real Monsters	Gábor Csupó; Peter Gaffney	Nickelodeon	1994–1997	Nickelodeon	
Santo Bugito	Arlene Klasky	CBS	1995–1996		
The Wild Thornberrys	Arlene Klasky; Gábor Csupó; Steve Pepoon; David Silverman; Stephen Sustarsic	Nickelodeon	1998–2004	Nickelodeon	
Stressed Eric	Carl Gorham	BBC 2 (UK); NBC (USA, season 1)	1998	Absolutely Productions; BBC Worldwide	Season 1 only
Rocket Power	Arlene Klasky; Gábor Csupó	Nickelodeon	1999–2004	Nickelodeon	
As Told by Ginger	Emily Kapnek	Nickelodeon	2000–2006	Nickelodeon	
All Grown Up!	Kate Boutilier; Eryk Casemiro; Monica Piper	Nickelodeon	2003–2008	Nickelodeon	Spin-off of 1991's Rugrats
Rugrats Pre-School Daze	Arlene Klasky; Gábor Csupó	Nickelodeon	2005 (UK); 2008 (US)	Nickelodeon	Spin-off of 1991's Rugrats
Poppy Cat	Lara Jones	Nick Jr. (UK); Sprout/NBC Kids (USA)	2011–2016	King Rollo Films; Coolabi Productions; Cake Entertainment; Ingenious Media (season 2)	U.S. production only; Based on the book series of the same name; First and only preschool series produced and dubbed by the company
Rugrats (2021)	Arlene Klasky; Gábor Csupó; Paul Germain	Paramount+/Nickelodeon (2021–2023); Nicktoons (2024); Nickelodeon Global (2026)	2021–2026	Nickelodeon Animation Studio	Reboot of the original 1991 series

=== Web series ===
Title	Year(s)	Notes
RoboSplaat!	2012–2022	Created by Arlene Klasky; Company's first web series
Dear Splaat	2016	Created by Arlene Klasky; Spin-off web series of RoboSplaat!

=== Films ===
Title	Year	Directors	Notes	Co-Production	Box office
The Rugrats Movie	1998	Igor Kovalyov and Norton Virgien	First film made by the studio First animated feature to ever cross the $100 million box office barrier outside of Disney	Nickelodeon Movies	$140.9 million
Rugrats in Paris: The Movie	2000	Stig Bergqvist and Paul Demeyer		Nickelodeon Movies	$103.3 million
The Wild Thornberrys Movie	2002	Cathy Malkasian and Jeff McGrath	Nominated for an Academy Award for Best Original Song for "Father and Daughter" by Paul Simon	Nickelodeon Movies	$60.7 million
Rugrats Go Wild	2003	John Eng and Norton Virgien	Crossover with Rugrats and The Wild Thornberrys	Nickelodeon Movies	$55.4 million
Immigrants	2008	Gábor Csupó	Final film to date	Hungaricom	$0.1 million

=== Pilots ===
Pilot	Creator(s)	Year(s)	Co-production(s)	Notes
Kevin's Kitchen	Arlene Klasky	1995		
Hogsters	Arlene Klasky; Gábor Csupó	1998		
The Carmichaels	Arlene Klasky; Gábor Csupó	1999	Nickelodeon Animation Studio	Planned spin-off of Rugrats. Later remade as A Rugrats Kwanzaa special.
Psyko Ferret	Atul Rao; Kim Saltarski; Greg van Riel; Karen Krenis; Brian Strause; Emily Kapnek; Paul Greenberg	2001	Nickelodeon Animation Studio	
Citizen Tony	Gábor Csupó	2003	Global Tantrum; The New TNN	
Stinky Pierre	Everett Peck	2003	Global Tantrum; The New TNN	
Bench Pressly	Sean Abley; John Eng; Ahmet Zappa	2004	Global Tantrum; Spike TV	
What's Cooking?	Arlene Klasky	2004	Nickelodeon Animation Studio	
You Animal	Bruce Wagner	2004	Global Tantrum; Spike TV	
Chicken Town	Niko Meulemans	2005	Nickelodeon Animation Studio	CGI
Commander Bunsworth	Aglaia Mortcheva	2005	Nickelodeon Animation Studio	
Junkyard Teddies	Arlene Klasky	2005	Nickelodeon Animation Studio	
Rollin' Rock Starz	Gábor Csupó	2005	Nickelodeon Animation Studio	
SCHMUTZ	James Proimos & David Hale	2005	Nickelodeon Animation Studio	
Wiener Squad	Niko Meulemans	2005	Nickelodeon Animation Studio	CGI
Zeek & Leo	Niko Meulemans	2005	Nickelodeon Animation Studio	CGI
Sugarless	Erin Ehrlich	2005	The N	
Twinkle	Dora Nagy	2005	Nick Jr. Productions	Planned first preschool animated series produced by the company
Big Babies	Arlene Klasky	2006	Nickelodeon Animation Studio	
Eggheads	Arlene Klasky	2006	Nickelodeon Animation Studio	
Ricky Z	Arlene Klasky	2006	Nickelodeon Animation Studio	
Ace Bogart: Space Ape	Neal Sopata	2006	Nickelodeon Animation Studio	
Grampa and Julie: Shark Hunters	Jef Czekaj	2006	Nickelodeon Animation Studio	
Little Freaks	Erin Ehrlich	2006	Nickelodeon Animation Studio	
Ronnie Biddles	John Matta; Ken Daly	2006	Nickelodeon Animation Studio	
My Stupid Cat	Everett Peck	2006	Nickelodeon Animation Studio	

=== Other projects ===
Title	Year(s)	Notes	Client
The Tracey Ullman Show	1987–1989	animated sequences	Gracie Films
21 Jump Street	1987	main title	Stephen J. Cannell Productions
Eddie Murphy Raw	1987	trailer	Paramount Pictures
Elvira, Mistress of the Dark	1988	title sequence	NBC Productions
Mortuary Academy	1988	title sequence	Landmark Films
Technological Threat	1988	test camera	Kroyer Films
Brotherhood of the Rose	1989	title sequence	NBC Productions
Stereotypes	1989	composite animation photography	Laurien Productions; Soviet Peace Committee
Anything but Love	1989	main titles	20th Century Fox Television
Quantum Leap	1989	main titles	Universal Television
Booker	1989	main titles	Stephen J. Cannell Productions
Halloween 5: The Revenge of Michael Myers	1989	title sequence	Trancas International
"Shadrach"	1989	music video	Beastie Boys
Shocker	1989	title sequence	Universal Pictures
Sesame Street	1990–1991	six shorts plus Monster in the Mirror	Children's Television Workshop
In Living Color	1990–1993	main titles	20th Television
Northern Exposure	1990	"Aurora Borealis: A Fairy Tale for Big People" (Aurora Borealis effect)	Universal Television
HBO Storybook Musicals	1990	"Alexander and the Terrible, Horrible, No Good, Very Bad Day"	HBO
"I Feel So Good"	1991	music video	Richard Thompson
Roc	1991	main titles	HBO Independent Productions
Man Trouble	1992	title sequence	20th Century Fox
Mo' Money	1992	title sequence	Columbia Pictures
Great Scott!	1992	main titles	Castle Rock Entertainment
Recycle Rex	1992	Designed and created by David Cutler	Disney Educational Productions
"Whatzupwitu"	1993	music video	Eddie Murphy
Edith Ann: A Few Pieces of the Puzzle (television special)	1993	Created by Lily Tomlin	ABC
Edith Ann: Homeless Go Home (television special)	1994	Created by Lily Tomlin	ABC
Magic Theatre	1994	game design and animation	Instinct Corporation; Knowledge Adventure
Bird in the Window	1996	short film	
Clueless	1996–1999	main titles	Paramount Television
Kelly Kelly	1998	main titles	Warner Bros. Television
The Wacky Adventures of Ronald McDonald	1998–2003	Direct-to-video series	McDonald's
Snowden's Raggedy Ann & Andy Holiday Show	1998	animation	Target
What's Inside Heidi's Head?	1999	Created by Nancye Ferguson and Mark Mothersbaugh; Company's first live-action series.	Noggin
"Don't Rush Me"	2000	music video	Juliana Hatfield
Flying Nansen	2000	short film	
Disney's One Saturday Morning	2000	opening and bumpers	Walt Disney Television
The Wayne Brady Show	2001	main titles	Buena Vista Television
The Ellen Show	2001	main titles	CBS Productions
The Anna Nicole Show	2002	main titles	E!
The Osbournes	2002	main titles	MTV
Girls Behaving Badly	2002	main titles	Oxygen
Punk'd	2003, 2006	main titles	MTV
Cartoon Network Groovies	2003	"Dee Dee and Dexter" (with Titmouse, Inc.)	Cartoon Network
The Ashlee Simpson Show	2004	main titles	MTV
"Dirty Little Thing"	2004	music video (with Titmouse, Inc.)	Velvet Revolver
The Princes of Malibu	2005	main titles	GRB Entertainment
Kathy Griffin: My Life on the D-List	2005	main titles	Bravo
Sunday Pants	2005	Oogloo + Anju, Food Court Diaries, and The Topside Rag	Cartoon Network
Passions	2005	animated scenes	NBC Universal Television Studio
PBS Kids Big Big Friend Day	2005	interstitial animation	PBS Kids
The Daly Planet	2006	main titles	Golf Channel
This Film Is Not Yet Rated	2006	title sequence and animation	BBC Films
The Simple Life	2006–2007	main titles	20th Century Fox Television
Bridge to Terabithia	2007	creature designs	Walden Media
Nip/Tuck	2007	main titles and "Damien Sands" animated scene	Warner Bros. Television
Los Campeones de la Lucha Libre	2008	recording studio	FWAK! Animation
Noodle and Doodle	2010	Doggity's	PBS Kids Sprout
The LeBrons	2011	sound recording (season 1)	Believe Entertainment Group; Spring Hill Productions
Ollie Mongo: Adventures in the Apocalypse	2012	Created by Arlene Klasky and Craig Singer. Company's first print-related series/comic book.	
Guardians of Oz	2015	recording studio	Ánima Estudios
Top Cat Begins	2015	recording studio	Ánima Estudios
Legend Quest	2017	recording studio	Ánima Estudios
Monster Island	2017	recording studio	Ánima Estudios

=== Commercials ===
- 1-800-COLLECT (1994)
- ABC (1987)
- ABC Family (2003, 2005)
- Acclaim Entertainment (1991, 1993)
- Aflac
- AirTouch (1990s)
- American Electric Power (2009)
- Anheuser-Busch (PSA; 1990s)
- Aquapod (2006)
- Animax (2000)
- ArcLight Cinemas (2002)
- Bandai (2009)
- Boddingtons Brewery (1999)
- Brawny
- Bridezillas (2006)
- Budweiser (2001)
- Burger King (1990, 1998, 2004)
- Butterfinger (1988, 1991)
- California State Lottery (1990s)
- Callaway Golf Company
- Campbell's (2004–2007)
- CareerBuilder (2008)
- Cartoon Network (Hi Hi Puffy AmiYumi promo)
- CBS (1990s)
- Central DuPage Hospital
- Chicago Tribune (late 1990s)
- Children's Health
- Chili's (1995)
- Chuck E. Cheese's (1997–2008)
- Cinnamon Toast Crunch (1990s)
- Clearasil (1994)
- The Coca-Cola Company (1988, 1995)
- Cocoa Pebbles (1999)
- Cocoa Puffs (1995, 2000)
- Digital Entertainment Network (2000)
- Disney Channel (Herbie: Fully Loaded ID; 2005)
- DoubleTree (1990s)
- E! (Herbie: Fully Loaded ID; 2005)
- EarthLink (2000)
- Easton (2004)
- Eggland's Best (mid-1990s)
- Eggo Waf-Fulls (2002)
- Entertainment This Week (1988)
- ESPN
- Farmers Insurance (1990s)
- Find Furby (1999)
- First Hawaiian Bank (1990s)
- Fox Video (1995)
- Fuel TV (2006)
- Fun Cuisine (2006)
- G4
- Go-Gurt (2008)
- Goldfish (2005–2006)
- Hallmark Cards (2005)
- Head and Shoulders (1999)
- The Hershey Company (1990s)
- Hertz (2008)
- Hilton Hotels (1990s)
- Hasbro (1999–2000)
- Honda (2000)
- Jell-O (1990s)
- Joy (2003–2004)
- Kashi
- KCOP (1982)
- Keebler (2004)
- Kidz Bop (2005–2008)
- Kmart (1982)
- Kraft Foods (1997, 2004)
- Lakeshore Entertainment (1997)
- Lands' End
- Levi's 501
- Lipton
- Lunchables (1995–1996)
- LunchMakers (1997)
- M&M's (2003)
- Mattel (1990s, 2003, 2005)
- Mazda (1990s)
- McDonald's (1997–1999, 2009)
- Mentos (2003)
- Mercury Villager (1998)
- MGA Entertainment (2002–2004, 2007)
- MGM/UA ("Action '88" showreel; 1988)
- Milky Way (1990s)
- Milton Bradley (1990s)
- Mimi's Cafe
- Minute Maid (2004)
- Mississippi State Department of Health (2006)
- The Movie Channel (1993)
- Mucinex (2004–2007)
- Mylan EpiPen
- Nabisco (2000)
- National Amusements (1995)
- NBC (1990–1991)
- Newport Beach Film Festival (2006)
- Nickelodeon (1999–2000, 2005–2007)
- Nicktoons (2003)
- Noggin (1999)
- Pop Tarts Pastry Swirls (2000)
- Powerade (1990s)
- Proximus (2009)
- Radio Disney (2005)
- Radio Vision (1989)
- Red Vines (2009)
- Rose Laser Medical Center (1989)
- Samsung Telecommunications (2008)
- San Diego Wild Animal Park (2000)
- SeaWorld (1990s)
- Sega (1990s)
- Shoe Carnival (2009)
- Six Flags Magic Mountain (1990s)
- Sony Digital (1994)
- Spike TV
- Sun Tan City
- Sweet Peppers Deli (2008)
- Taco Bell (1995–1996)
- TNT Wild World of Shorts! (1991)
- Tombstone Pizza (early 2000s)
- Toy Biz (2000)
- Toyota (2007)
- Toyota Grand Prix of Long Beach (1990)
- United States Postal Service (training film; mid-1990s)
- Urban Outfitters (2006)
- Wheel of Fortune (1991)
- WSRB
- Zapf Creation (2007)

== See also ==
- Nickelodeon Animation Studio
- Film Roman
