= Sunwoo Entertainment =

South Korean animation studio

Sunwoo Animation (Korea) Co., Ltd. ㈜선우앤컴퍼니
- Industry: Animation
- Founded: 1974; 52 years ago
- Headquarters: Seoul, South Korea
- Products: Movies; TV shows
- Website: sunwoo.com

Sunwoo & Company, Co., Ltd. (Korean: ㈜선우앤컴퍼니) is a South Korean animation studio located in Seoul, South Korea. It was established as Sunwoo Production Inc. in 1974. It began by producing animation mainly for Disney Afternoon TV series, such as Chip 'n Dale Rescue Rangers, Bonkers and Darkwing Duck, and soon expanded by providing animation services for Nickelodeon shows like Rocko's Modern Life and Invader Zim, and other series like Duckman on USA Network and Fatherhood on Nick at Nite.

Many studios have been "spun off" from Sunwoo; the first to do so was Anivision, which was established in March 1991. Anivision worked on The Simpsons, with AKOM and Rough Draft Studios, and Rugrats, replacing Wang Film Productions for its 2nd season in 1992. Grimsaem Animation Co. Ltd., Seoul, Korea, which mainly does feature-length work for Nickelodeon, was established in March 1997. In April 1998, Sunwoo Digital International was established, whose most notable work was for the Fox TV series Family Guy. In April 2000, all of these spin-off studios were merged under the banner Sunwoo Entertainment, and it has remained that way ever since.

== TV series/specials that Sunwoo has worked on ==
- Chip 'n Dale Rescue Rangers (1989–1990, Seasons 2 and 3 only) - Sunwoo, the company's first notable U.S. work; 12 episodes: "Battle of the Bulge", "Ghost of a Chance", "A Case of Stage Blight", "Normie's Science Project", "Shell Shocked", "Mind Your Cheese and Q's", "When You Fish Upon a Star", "Rest Home Rangers", "Gorilla My Dreams", "A Fly in the Ointment", "A Chorus Crime" and "They Shoot Dogs, Don't They"
- TaleSpin (1990–1991) - 23 episodes.
- Darkwing Duck (1991–1992) - 40 episodes.
- Sri Sairam Films (1991)
- Winnie the Pooh and Christmas Too (1991) (ink & paint/camera services)
- Goof Troop (1992–1993) - 17 episodes.
- The Simpsons (1991–1999) - 57 episodes (Anivision, seasons 3-10).
- Rugrats (1992–2004) - seasons 2-9
- Cro (1993–1994)
- Bonkers (1993–1994) - 20 episodes.
- Rocko's Modern Life (1993–1996, animation services only) - 38½ episodes.
- Aladdin (1994–1995) - 21 episodes.
- Duckman (1994–1997) - 52 episodes.
- Gargoyles (1994–1997) - 61 episodes.
- Beavis and Butt-Head (1995–1997) (overseas animation only)
- Dumb and Dumber (1995–1996) - 13 episodes.
- Timon & Pumbaa (1995–1999)
- Jumanji (1996–1999)
- The Mighty Ducks (1996–1997)
- Quack Pack (1996) - 20 episodes.
- Spin Kicker (1996)
- 101 Dalmatians: The Animated Series (1997–1998) - 7 episodes.
- The Angry Beavers (1997–2001)
- Johnny Bravo (1997) - a few Season 1 episodes.
- King of the Hill (1997–2003, overseas animation only) - 3 episodes.
- Pepper Ann (1997–2001) - 64 episodes; 110 segments
- Recess (1997–2001) - 25 episodes; 31 segments
- Space Goofs (1997–1998) (Season 1 only)
- Bad Dog (1998–1999)
- Hercules (1998–1999)
- The Wacky Adventures of Ronald McDonald (1998–2003)
- The Wild Thornberrys (1998–2004) - only for 12 episodes.
- Family Guy (1999–2008) - Grimsaem/Sunwoo Digital in Seasons 1-2, Sunwoo in Seasons 2-6
- The New Woody Woodpecker Show (1999–2000) - replaced by Mercury Filmworks for Season 3.
- Milo's Bug Quest (2000)
- As Told by Ginger (2000–2006)
- Baby Blues (2000–2002)
- Buzz Lightyear of Star Command (2000–2001, animation services only)
- Invader Zim (2001–2004, animation services only)
- The Mummy (2001–2003)
- Lloyd in Space (2001–2004)
- Space Hip-Hop Duck (2002–2003)
- The Fairly OddParents ("Crash Nebula" episode only)
- Teamo Supremo (2002–2004)
- Mr. Bean: The Animated Series (2002–2004)
- Big Bear and Nanook (2003)
- Mini B (2003)
- WAB/Animal Baby (2003)
- All Grown Up! (2003–2008)
- Lilo & Stitch: The Series (2003–2006)
- Yakkity Yak (2003)
- Fatherhood (2004–2005)
- American Dragon: Jake Long (2005–2007) (season 1 only)
- American Dad! (2005–2007) (Seasons 1–3; production order only)
- Mix Master (2005)
- Curious George (2006–2007, few Season 1 episodes)
- I Got a Rocket! (2006–2007)
- Growing Up Creepie (2006–2008)
- Bloody Bunny (2006)
- Ovni (2007)
- Metajets (2008)
- Special Agent Oso (2009–2012)
- Kung Fu Dino Posse (2010–2011)
- Mix Master Final Force (2010)
- Tales of Friendship with Winnie the Pooh (2012)
- Sofia the First (2013–2018) - 5 episodes: "The Shy Princess", "Baileywick's Day Off", "Two to Tangu", "The Buttercups", "Tea for Too Many"
- Xiaolin Chronicles (2013–2014) - 7 episodes: "New Monk on the Block", "A Girl Named Willow", "The Fall of the Xiaolin", "Buddy Blu-ray and the Golden Bunnies", "Tokyo Madness", "Magic Stallion and the Wild Wild West", and "Back in the Flesh Again"

== Licensed content ==
- Paul's Miraculous Adventure (1976–1977) for Tatsunoko Production
- Colorful Crayon (2008)
- Petit Petit Muse (2008) for Seoul Movie (succeeded by Soul Creative)
- Transformers: Cybertron (2005–2006, with Gonzo)

== OVA ==
- Dooly's Journey to the World (1995)
- Mulk & Swank's Music Show (1996, Co-Produced with Film Roman & Tooniverse)
- My Friend Kommy (1997)
- Curious Ping & Pong (2002)
- The Night B4 Christmas (2003)

== Flash animation ==
- Mouth (2000)
- Gold Fish (2000)
- The Dunk/Dunk Shot (2000)
- Twig & Reek (2000)
- Heem-Man/Power Man (2000)
- Secret of Penis Island (2000)
- Click Click Rap/CLICK CLICK (2000)
- Diving Contest (2001)
- Whiteday (2001)
- Mini B (2001)
- GRASMAN (2001)
- Subway 999 (2001)
- PUFF (2001)
- Hamilton's Cafe (2002)
- Bizarre Dentist (2002)
- K-diary (2002)
- Boom Sisters (2002)
- The Third Eye (2002)
- Love Plus (2002)
- Rangkas (2002)
- Taxi Squadron (2003)
- Dashing & Rushing JJang (2003)
- Warys Parody (2003)

== Films including work by Sunwoo ==
- Beavis and Butt-Head Do America (overseas production)
- The Rugrats Movie (animation and digital production services)
- Rugrats in Paris: The Movie (digital production services)
- Recess: School's Out (animation production, Sunwoo Animation Co., Inc.)
- Rugrats Go Wild (animation production)
- The Wild Thornberrys Movie (animation production)
- Winnie the Pooh: A Very Merry Pooh Year (ink & paint/camera services)
- Stewie Griffin: The Untold Story
- Inside the CIA
- Curious George (2006)
- Yobi, the Five Tailed Fox / Cubby the Fox Yeu Woo Bi (2007)
- The Illusionist
- Dreamland Cartoon Theater
  - Starland Trio (별나라 삼총사; 1979)
  - Time Machine 001 (삼총사 타임머신 001; 1980)
  - Fifteen Children Space Adventure (15소년 우주표류기; 1980)
  - 3000 Leagues in Search of Mother (엄마 찾아 삼만리; 1981)
- The Siren (2000) (produced by Pass21 Entertainment)
- Wild Card (2003) (produced by C&Film / Yoojin E&C)
- Liar (2004) (produced by Sunwoo Entertainment)
- R-Point (2004) (produced by C&Film)
- Some (2004) (produced by C&Film)
- The Chronicles of Riddick: Dark Fury (animated and directed by Peter Chung)
- Van Helsing: The London Assignment (produced by Universal Cartoon Studios and Production I.G.)

== See also ==
- Anivision
- Grimsaem Animation Co. Ltd., Seoul, Korea
- AKOM

== Homepage ==
- Sunwoo Entertainment Homepage (in Korean)
- Sunwoo Entertainment Another Homepage
