= Anivision =

South Korean-American animation studio

Anivision Corporation (주)애니비젼 코리아
- Company type: Private
- Industry: Overseas animation
- Founded: Seoul, South Korea (March 1991)
- Defunct: April 2003
- Fate: Merger with Sunwoo Animation Co., Inc.
- Headquarters: Seoul, South Korea, United States
- Area served: South Korea, United States
- Key people: J.C. Park; Kang Han Young (Sunwoo Animation Co., Inc.)
- Products: The Simpsons, Rugrats
- Parent: Sunwoo Animation Co., Inc.
- Website: sunwoo.com

Anivision ((주)애니비젼 코리아) was a Korean animation studio. It was founded in March 1991, then merged with Sunwoo Entertainment in April 2003.

== Filmography ==
- The Simpsons (1991–99; 59 episodes)
- Rugrats (1992–2002; 73 episodes)
- Aaahh!!! Real Monsters (1994–97; 50 episodes)
- Duckman (1994–97; 37 episodes)
- Edith Ann: Homeless Go Home (1994)
- Cro (1994)
- Santo Bugito (1995; 9 episodes)
- Quack Pack (1996)
- Space Goofs (1997; 15 episodes)
- Salty's Lighthouse (1997–98)
- Animal Crackers (1997–99; 39 episodes)
- Stressed Eric (1998; 6 episodes, uncredited)
- King of the Hill (1998, 2001; 3 episodes)
- The Wild Thornberrys (1998–2004; 79 episodes)
- Recess (1999–2000; 2 episodes)
- Rocket Power (1999–2004; 32 episodes)
- As Told by Ginger (2000–04; 49 episodes)
