= List of Captain Planet episodes =

The following is a list of episodes from the Captain Planet and the Planeteers animated series. The show was the second longest-running cartoon series of the 1990s, with a total of 113 episodes.

== Series overview ==
Season	Episodes	Originally released	
Season	Episodes	First released	Last released
1	26	September 15, 1990	June 1, 1991
2	26	September 14, 1991	April 11, 1992
3	13	September 12, 1992	December 5, 1992
4	22	September 11, 1993	May 14, 1994
5	13	September 10, 1994	May 13, 1995
6	13	September 9, 1995	May 11, 1996

== Captain Planet and the Planeteers episodes ==
=== Season 1 (1990–91) ===
LeVar Burton does the opening narration. Special guest stars in this season include Christopher Daniel Barnes, Mark Langston, and Michelle Langston.

No. overall	No. in season	Title	Directed by	Written by	Original release date	Prod. code	Eco-Villain(s)
1	1	"A Hero for Earth"	Will Meugniot	Story by : Nicholas Boxer; Teleplay by : Billy Ruebin	September 15, 1990	210-100-001	Hoggish Greedly & Rigger
Gaia, the spirit of the Earth, summons four teenagers and a young boy named Ma-Ti from five different corners of the world to help her in the battle to save the planet. For their first assignment, the Planeteers battle Hoggish Greedly, whose oil rig operation is jeopardizing the coastline. Note: First appearances of Captain Planet, Gaia, the Planeteers (Kwame, Wheeler, Linka, Gi and Ma-Ti), Hoggish Greedly and Rigger.
2	2	"Rain of Terror"	Will Meugniot	Perry Martin	September 22, 1990	210-100-008	Verminous Skumm
Ma-Ti battles self-esteem issues as the Planeteers try to stop Verminous Skumm from destroying a city with a giant cloud of acid rain. Note: First appearance of Verminous Skumm.
3	3	"Beast of the Temple"	Will Meugniot	Ted Pedersen & Steve Hayes	September 29, 1990	210-100-007	Hoggish Greedly & Rigger
The Planeteers travel to Thailand in order to prevent Greedly and Rigger from surface mining for rubies and terrorizing the people.
4	4	"Skumm Lord"	Will Meugniot	Story by : Nick Boxer; Teleplay by : Martha Moran	October 6, 1990	210-100-010	Verminous Skumm
When Verminous Skumm contaminates the water supplies of South America with a disease known as "rat rot", which turns its victims into rat-human hybrids, it's up to Kwame and Ma-Ti to find a cure when the other Planeteers become infected.
5	5	"Deadly Ransom"	Will Meugniot	Perry Martin	October 13, 1990	210-100-011	Dr. Blight, MAL and Duke Nukem
Dr. Blight and Duke Nukem hold Captain Planet prisoner in Antarctica, demanding that the Planeteers give them a lifetime supply of nuclear waste in return for his safety. Without their powers, the Planeteers must mount a daring rescue in order to save Captain Planet. Note #1: First appearance of Dr. Blight, MAL and Duke Nukem. Note #2: First case of Eco-Villains working together.
6	6	"The Conqueror"	Will Meugniot	Doug Molitor	October 20, 1990	210-100-015	Zarm
The Planeteers are led astray by the promise of power from Zarm, a war-like god and another spirit of Earth like Gaia who poses as an alien to the Planeteers. Zarm dazzles the Planeteers into telling them that they can create an environmental utopia on Earth and gets them to follow him instead of Gaia, save for Ma-Ti, whose loyalty to Gaia is the strongest. With the Planeteers split up, Gaia becomes mortal and increasingly weaker. Can Ma-Ti convince the Planeteers that Zarm's true intent is to instigate a nuclear war? Note: First appearance of Zarm.
7	7	"Last of Her Kind"	Will Meugniot	Reed Shelly & Bruce Shelly	October 27, 1990	210-100-002	Looten Plunder and Argos Bleak
Wheeler plans to buy Linka an ivory necklace for her birthday, but Kwame recommends anything except that for a gift. Meanwhile, Looten Plunder is wiping out the elephant population of Africa, Kwame's native land, in order to gain a quick profit in the ivory trade. Wheeler learns firsthand the true cost of ivory trinkets, as he and the other Planeteers help return a baby elephant to its mother and battle to save the elephants from extinction. Note #1: First appearance of Looten Plunder and Argos Bleak. This is also the episode that sees Plunder uttering of the famous line "You'll pay for this, Captain Planet!", which would resonate throughout the end credits for the series. Note #2: While some episode listings have the title as "The Last of her Kind", the episode title as it appears on-screen in the episode itself is written merely as "Last of her Kind".
8	8	"The Dead Seas"	Will Meugniot	Martha Moran	November 3, 1990	210-100-003	Hoggish Greedly and Rigger
Hoggish Greedly and Rigger scheme to catch and sell all the fish in the ocean with a fleet of illegal drift net fishing boats. When Greedly steals their rings, the Planeteers are forced to use their initiative to retrieve them and save thousands of marine animals from the eco-villains' deadly nets.
9	9	"Tree of Life"	Will Meugniot	Michael Maurer	November 10, 1990	210-100-012	Dr. Blight & MAL
Dr. Blight and her robojacks chop down a sacred tree known to villagers as the "Tree of Life" and Blight harnesses the tree's powers for herself. With her new powers, Blight grows gigantic and a match for Captain Planet, then plans to destroy the ancient redwood forests. Special Guest Star: Floyd Red Crow Westerman as Old Indian Man.
10	10	"Volcano's Wrath"	Will Meugniot	Robert Schooley & Mark McCorkle	November 17, 1990	210-100-009	Sly Sludge
Sly Sludge, who claims to have solved the world's problems of waste management by inventing a shrink ray that reduces garbage, is making big bucks by having countries ship their garbage to him for disposal. However, Sludge is secretly only dumping the garbage into a volcano on Laipuno Island. When the volcano erupts, Captain Planet and the Planeteers must save the islanders from the lava flow. Note: First appearance of Sly Sludge.
11	11	"Littlest Planeteer"	Will Meugniot	Dorothy Middleton	November 24, 1990	210-100-014	Dr. Blight & MAL
When the Planeteers stop a bus full of elementary school students from diving off a cliff, nine-year-old Jason, one of the students, follows the Planeteers home and idolizes Wheeler. When Wheeler suffers from second degree burns which renders him unable to use his ring, Jason steals Wheeler's ring and tries to single-handedly battle Dr. Blight's newly created smog monster, which feeds on air pollution, Jason learns what it really means to be a Planeteer. Later on, Captain Planet makes Jason an honorary Planeteer.
12	12	"A World Below Us"	Will Meugniot	Michael Maurer	January 26, 1991	210-100-013	Sly Sludge
After Gi is rescued from Sly Sludge's mechanical octopus, she is taken to a secret underwater city known as Oceanus, which is being threatened by Sludge's illegal toxic dumping. When the dome around Oceanus begins to burst, flooding the city, Captain Planet and the Planeteers must race against time to save the people of this underwater paradise. Note: First appearance of Sly Sludge's right-hand man Ooze.
13	13	"Plunder Dam"	Will Meugniot	Rowby Goren	February 2, 1991	210-100-020	Looten Plunder and Argos Bleak
Looten Plunder dams an African river and installs a large hydroelectric power plant, cutting off water supplies to the villages like one led by Chief Mola. Gaia warns that only carefully engineered dams are beneficial. The villagers soon realize that Plunder's electricity is not a fair trade for the food and water that the river provided. With their crops dying and thirst-crazed elephants on the rampage, they enlist the help of the Planeteers to stop Plunder's scheme. The Planeteers then build a wisely placed dam to balance proper river flow with electrification of the village while contending with a robotic Nyami Nyami operated by Plunder and Argos Bleak. Special Guest Star: Brock Peters as Chief Mola.
14	14	"Meltdown Syndrome"	Will Meugniot	Phil Harnage	February 9, 1991	210-100-017	Duke Nukem and Leadsuit
When a scientist tries to cover up a radiation leak at a nuclear power plant, Duke Nukem zeros in on the "hot spot" and triggers a meltdown. With time running out, Captain Planet and the Planeteers are forced to cool off the reactor before an explosion occurs and contaminates the planet. When the scientist admits that he supported nuclear power on the basis it was clean and plentiful in an attempt to solve the energy crisis, the Planeteers recommend he instead research geothermal power. Note: First appearance of Duke Nukem's right-hand man Leadsuit.
15	15	"Smog Hog"	Will Meugniot	Martha Moran	February 16, 1991	210-100-022	Hoggish Greedly and Rigger
Greedly hijacks Jane Goodair's environmentally friendly automobile factory in order to manufacture his Road Hog, a smog-spewing nightmare, and the city is soon choking on exhaust fumes. When his own son Greedly Jr. falls ill from the pollution, Greedly must turn to Captain Planet and the Planeteers for help. Special Guest Stars: Phyllis Diller as Jane Goodair and Charlie Schlatter as Hoggish Greedly Jr.
16	16	"Polluting by Computer"	Will Meugniot	Ted Pedersen & Steve Hayes	February 23, 1991	210-100-004	Sly Sludge, Dr. Blight & MAL
Sly Sludge, Dr. Blight, and her computer MAL hack into the government's computer system in order to obtain phony legal documents allowing them to change all the national parks into giant toxic waste dumps. In addition, they falsify the criminal records of the Planeteers and cleans up Sly Sludge's background check to make him look like a committed environmentalist.
17	17	"Don't Drink the Water"	Will Meugniot	Dan DiStefano	March 2, 1991	210-100-018	Looten Plunder, Argos Bleak, Dr. Blight, Verminous Skumm, Hoggish Greedly & Rigger
Four of the main eco villains (and their henchmen) join forces in a plot to pollute a city's water supply so they can sell their bottled water to thirsty citizens at outrageous prices. Captain Planet and the Planeteers set out on a mission to find pure water and break up the "Pollution Syndicate".
18	18	"Kwame's Crisis"	Will Meugniot	Story by : Pam Dovale & Susan Leslie; Teleplay by : Doug Molitor	March 9, 1991	210-100-021	Sly Sludge & Ooze
Sly Sludge is burying a small town under garbage and the townspeople don't seem to care. Feeling he can't make a difference, Kwame leaves the Planeteers, but a young girl's single-handed recycling effort restores his faith, and with her help he attempts to save the Planeteers from Sludge's giant trash compactor.
19	19	"Ozone Hole"	Will Meugniot	Doug Molitor	April 13, 1991	210-100-006	Duke Nukem and Leadsuit
Duke Nukem destroys the ozone layer over Antarctica with C.F.C. gases so he can feast on the sun's dangerous UV rays. Captain Planet and the Planeteers battle to protect the Earth from Nukem's deadly radiation. Note: First unmasked appearance of Leadsuit.
20	20	"The Ultimate Pollution"	Will Meugniot	Cliff McGillivray	April 20, 1991	210-100-016	Looten Plunder and Argos Bleak
Looten Plunder instigates a war between two desert villages so that he can sell firearms to both sides. When the Planeteers try to expose his scam, he imprisons them in a toxic trap. With bombs exploding around them, it is up to two young boys from the opposing villages to make their parents see sense, free the Planeteers and help stop the destruction.
21	21	"Population Bomb"	Will Meugniot	Phil Harnage	April 27, 1991	210-100-005	N/A
The Planeteers learn that the world is very overpopulated and some countries try to slow it down. Wheeler, annoyed at the idea of anyone recommending how many children to have, goes out windsurfing despite an approaching storm. He is blown off-course and is washed up on an island with a miniature city. The inhabitants, genetically affected mice with human characteristics including overpopulation and its resulting polluted land, capture Wheeler for food. Wheeler also learns the mouse civilization is a dictatorship whose junta plans to invade and colonize Hope Island.
22	22	"Mission to Save Earth, Part One"	Will Meugniot	Story by : Nicholas Boxer, J. Larry Carroll & David B. Carren; Teleplay by : J. Larry Carroll & David B. Carren	May 4, 1991	210-100-023	Dr. Blight & Mal, Looten Plunder, Duke Nukem, Verminous Skumm and Sly Sludge
5 of the main eco-villains steal the Planeteers' rings and abandon them on an island inhabited by Commander Clash, a soldier with a cold war mentality. Clash appears to be their most dangerous opponent to date, until Captain Pollution, summoned by evil duplicates of the Planeteers' rings created by Dr. Blight, appears and traps them. Special Guest Star: Louis Gossett Jr. as Commander Clash.
23	23	"Mission to Save Earth, Part Two"	Will Meugniot	Story by : Nicholas Boxer; Teleplay by : J. Larry Carroll & David B. Carren	May 11, 1991	210-100-024	Dr. Blight & Mal, Looten Plunder, Duke Nukem, Verminous Skumm and Sly Sludge
The Planeteers befriend Commander Clash and convince him to help them retrieve their rings and use his military skills in the battle against Captain Pollution. Special Guest Star: Louis Gossett Jr. as Commander Clash.
24	24	"Two Futures, Part One"	Will Meugniot	Doug Molitor	May 18, 1991	210-100-025	Dr. Blight & Mal and Hoggish Greedly & Rigger
The Planeteers' mission to prevent Dr. Blight and Greedly from travelling back in time to speed up global warming takes a turn for the worse. When Wheeler gets chastised for messing up, he doubts his own worth as a Planeteer. Dr. Blight sweet talks Wheeler into forgetting the Planeteers, and has MAL send Wheeler back in time and alter his past. Wheeler accepts and convinces his past self to get rid of his Planeeter ring with MAL being manipulated by Gaia to take him through time. However, Wheeler is then sent forward 35 years into the future (2026), where he sees first hand how his actions end up drastically changing the future.
25	25	"Two Futures, Part Two"	Will Meugniot	Doug Molitor	May 25, 1991	210-100-026	Hoggish Greedly & Rigger and Dr. Blight & Mal
Traveling back in time so that he never becomes a Planeteer, Wheeler jeopardizes the survival of life on Earth. Gaia told Wheeler that after he traveled back in time to get rid of his Fire ring, he has changed the history and when Wheeler asks Gaia why somebody else wasn’t chosen to become a Planeteer instead of him, Gaia reminds him that he was supposed to set an example for countless others and since he declined to be a Planeteer, the Planeteers went their separate ways and there was no Captain Planet. After Wheeler changed his past, Dr. Blight sent Hoggish Greedly and Rigger back in time to the 1950s to take advantage of lower environmental standards. When Gaia gives him the chance to go into the future and see the consequences of his actions upon manipulating MAL again, he sees all sorts of environmental disasters. He also meets aged versions of his fellow Planeteers who are struggling by themselves to fend off problems, as well as a powerful and super-rich Hoggish Greedly and Rigger who have taken over Hope Island, made Gaia die as her hut is now a toxic waste dump and made Hope Island into Las Vegas type Glitter and Glamour place. Wheeler realizes how much he, along with every individual, contributes to the future of the planet.
26	26	"Heat Wave"	Will Meugniot	Story by : Meg Mclaughlin; Teleplay by : Doug Molitor	June 1, 1991	210-100-019	Dr. Blight & Mal
Dr. Blight attacks Hope Island by encasing it in a dome then using her smog-spewing barge to create a greenhouse effect. With Gaia's life in danger, the Planeteers enlist the help of a giant whale to break free from Blight's heat wave and call Captain Planet.

=== Season 2 (1991–92) ===
Special guest stars in this season include Franklin Ajaye, Robert Ito, and Ricki Lake.

No. overall	No. in season	Title	Directed by	Written by	Original release date	Prod. code	Eco-Villain(s)
27	1	"Mind Pollution"	Jim Duffy	Doug Molitor	September 14, 1991	210-203	Verminous Skumm
Visiting her cousin Boris in Washington, D.C., Linka finds out he is under the influence of a designer drug known as 'Bliss', peddled by Verminous Skumm. Boris spikes Linka's food with Bliss, turning her into an addict, and the other Planeteers must try to help her break her addiction while also trying to stop drug-fueled riots from breaking out across the city but they are too late to save Boris. This is one of the darkest Captain Planet episodes, showing not only the heavy corruption of one of the series' protagonists, but also the death of her cousin Boris. Special Guest Stars: Phil Hartman as Uncle Dimitri, and Jeff Bennett as Cousin Boris.
28	2	"The Garbage Strikes"	Jim Duffy	Phil Harnage	September 21, 1991	210-201	Sly Sludge
To make fast cash from a trash strike, Sly Sludge steals an untested microbe from Dr. Helix, a scientist admired by Gi. The microbe was supposed to be a technological fix for the problem of overflowing landfills, but it simply absorbs trash to become a city-devouring garbage monster.
29	3	"Domes of Doom"	Jim Duffy	Story by : Nicholas Boxer and Sandra Ryan; Teleplay by : Sandra Ryan	September 28, 1991	210-202	Looten Plunder
It's up to the Planeteers to stop Looten Plunder after he hoodwinks the world into signing over its forests to his care, then covers them with giant domes and sells the cooled, clean air from these "air conditioners of the planet" at astronomical prices.
30	4	"Send in the Clones"	Jim Duffy	Paul Dell, Steven Weiss and Doug Molitor	October 5, 1991	210-204	Looten Plunder, Dr. Blight and MAL
Kwame befriends Leela, a schoolgirl on the island of Mogahl whose parents keep having children, hoping for another son. They get their wish when Looten Plunder and Dr. Blight, looking for cheap labor, turn their cloning ray on Leela's brother Vico, who doubles in number each time he eats. Soon Vico numbers in the millions and, along with an accidentally cloned locust swarm, threaten the island's food supply.
31	5	"The Predator"	Jim Duffy	Phil Harnage	October 12, 1991	210-206	Argos Bleak
In the Florida Keys, Ma-Ti has a brush with what he thinks is a giant man eater, though Gi reveals that it is a harmless basking shark. But panic spreads through the resort town which hires Argos Bleak to eradicate all the sharks in the bay. When stinging jellyfish which the sharks used to feed on swarm the beach, the townspeople learn that predators have an important role in the ecosystem as Captain Planet is summoned to deal with Bleak.
32	6	"The Ark"	Jim Duffy	Doug Molitor	October 19, 1991	210-205	Hoggish Greedly and Dr. Blight
The Planeteers find themselves whisked aboard an interstellar Noah's Ark while trying to save endangered tigers from Hoggish Greedly and Dr. Blight's forest-destroying Monster Golf Cart in India. The alien zookeeper named Collector thinks humans are an endangered species whose habitat is about to be destroyed. Special Guest Star: Fred Savage as Mohan.
33	7	"Isle of Solar Energy"	Jim Duffy	Pat Allee and Ben Hurst	October 26, 1991	210-207	Duke Nukem and Leadsuit
The Planeteers stumble across the island of Dr. Apollo, an American scientist who has perfected incredible devices for storing and transmitting solar power. They discover that the laboratory assistant is actually Leadsuit, who is helping Duke Nukem subvert solar technology to produce a radioactive weapon. Special Guest Stars: Danny Glover as Dr. Apollo and Cree Summer as Karen.
34	8	"The Coral Killer"	Jim Duffy	Story by : Paul Dell, Steven Weiss & Nicholas Boxer; Teleplay by : Paul Dell & Steven Weiss	November 2, 1991	210-208	Hoggish Greedly and Rigger
Hoggish Greedly and Rigger teach Tacio, a struggling Filipino fisherman, how to go dynamite fishing without telling him the irreversible damage it does to the fish population and to the coral reef. It is all a cover for Greedly's underwater Reef Ripper, which is harvesting the shattered coral. But Gi takes Tacio's wife Marcaria underwater and then to an impoverished, wave-battered island nearby, to show what can happen when a protective reef is gone.
35	9	"The Big Clam Up"	Jim Duffy	Doug Molitor	November 9, 1991	210-209	Verminous Skumm
The people of San Francisco are collapsing with symptoms that suggest a whole range of pollution poisoning. As the Planeteers follow clues to solve this mystery, Ma-Ti, who has been reading 1940s detective novels, keeps imagining himself as a private eye. Ma-Ti proves a poor sleuth at first, but eventually traces the source of the illness to Verminous Skumm who is serving seafood tainted by storm drain runoff in his restaurant "The Sinking Ship" where he has captured the other Planeteers and intends to poison them.
36	10	"An Inside Job"	Jim Duffy	Paul Dell and Steven Weiss	November 16, 1991	210-211	Sly Sludge, Dr. Blight & Mal
Sly Sludge and four of the Planeteers learn first hand the terrible effects of untreated sewage when MAL and Dr. Blight shrink the EcoSub (and them) to microscopic size and put them into polluted water, which Kwame unwittingly drinks. The Planeteers must battle hideous water-borne parasites in Kwame's body so that he can recover and restore themselves to proper size.
37	11	"The Fine Print"	Jim Duffy	Phil Harnage	November 23, 1991	210-214	Looten Plunder and Argos Bleak
Looten Plunder and Argos Bleak exploit an agricultural worker's hidden shame - illiteracy - by putting the man in charge of spraying pesticides. He can't read the written warnings. As a result, he uses too much pesticide, creating a lethal cloud that threatens a nearby town.
38	12	"Off Road Hog"	Jim Duffy	Doug Molitor	November 30, 1991	210-210	Hoggish Greedly and Rigger
Pete, a dirt bike enthusiast, loves off-road racing with Hoggish Greedly and Rigger, until Ma-Ti and desert guide Joshua Stone show him how alive this "barren" desert really is and how much damage off-road vehicles do to it. Pete and the Planeteers swoop in on hang gliders to stop Greedly's ORV race, but Captain Planet is needed to save everyone from a flash flood. Special Guest Star: Dennis Weaver as Joshua Stone.
39	13	"Trouble on the Half Shell"	Jim Duffy	Story by : Nicholas Boxer; Teleplay by : Nicholas Boxer and Doug Molitor	December 7, 1991	210-213	Hoggish Greedly and Verminous Skumm
The Planeteers are present for the testing of JASON, a robot that observes wildlife and the environment and transmits the data to its home base. The tests are being done on the Galapagos Islands, which is where Hoggish Greedly, Verminous Skumm and his rats have crash landed, since their ship was thrown off course from a storm. Now they're hungry and consider feasting on tortoise eggs to fill their appetites. The Planeteers must fly to the Galapagos to save the eggs and remove the rats from the environment to restore the balance of its ecosystem. Note: First time Linka reciprocates Wheeler's crush on her by kissing
40	14	"Stardust"	Jim Duffy	Pat Allee and Ben Hurst	January 18, 1992	210-215	Hoggish Greedly and Rigger
Gi and Linka are livid when Wheeler belittles their favorite rock singer Sky Runner, but it looks as though Wheeler may be right when they come upon a land-ravaging surface mining operation run by Hoggish Greedly, but bankrolled by none other than their idol. Special Guest Star: Robby Romero as Sky Runner.
41	15	"The Blue Car Line"	Jim Duffy	Pat Allee and Ben Hurst	January 25, 1992	210-216	Looten Plunder and Argos Bleak
Gaia becomes suspicious when air pollution suddenly skyrockets in an Australian city with one of the best mass transit systems in the world. The Planeteers investigate and discover that Looten Plunder and Argos Bleak are behind the problem. They are making it appear that the transit line is haunted, allowing them to profit from a massive freeway system and auto-related businesses.
42	16	"Birds of a Feather"	Jim Duffy	Sandra Ryan	February 1, 1992	210-217	Hoggish Greedly and Rigger
Linka and Ma-Ti visit a friend named Juan in Central America. While there, Juan's parrot El Profesor leads them to a secluded "bird paradise" when a giant, metallic bird appears. All the birds, including El Profesor, follow it, as do Linka and Ma-Ti, who soon find themselves locked in a giant aviary, courtesy of Hoggish Greedly, who is running an exotic bird smuggling venture.
43	17	"Summit to Save Earth, Part One"	Jim Duffy	Story by : Nicholas Boxer, Pat Allee and Ben Hurst; Teleplay by : Martha Moran	February 8, 1992	210-221	Zarm, Hoggish Greedly, Looten Plunder, Sly Sludge, Duke Nukem, Verminous Skumm and Dr. Blight
At the Earth Summit in Rio de Janeiro, the Planeteers are impressed by the proposed ecology measures, until the world leaders suddenly reverse their positions – victims of Zarm's treachery. In addition, Zarm has united Hoggish Greedly, Looten Plunder, Sly Sludge, Duke Nukem, Verminous Skumm, and Dr. Blight under his leadership. He then tricks the Planeteers into giving up their rings and traps them on his spaceship. Zarm then zaps Gaia into human form, aging her and destroying the planet simultaneously. Special Guest Star: Héctor Elizondo as the President of Brazil
44	18	"Summit to Save Earth, Part Two"	Jim Duffy	Story by : Nicholas Boxer, Pat Allee and Ben Hurst; Teleplay by : Martha Moran	February 15, 1992	210-222	Zarm, Hoggish Greedly, Looten Plunder, Sly Sludge, Duke Nukem, Verminous Skumm and Dr. Blight
After discovering that it is ten years later outside Zarm's ship, the Planeteers race to find Commander Clash before Gaia ages into dust. He returns with them and fights Zarm, but is defeated and opts to return to his island. The Planeteers refuse to give up and are recaptured and taunted by Zarm. He is just about to decimate Ma-Ti when Clash reappears and saves Gaia and the Planeteers. Special Guest Stars: Héctor Elizondo as the President of Brazil, Louis Gossett Jr. as Commander Clash.
45	19	"Losing Game"	Jim Duffy	Phil Harnage	February 22, 1992	210-223	Dr. Blight and MAL
Kwame takes the Planeteers to Africa to meet an old friend from his tribe Dr. Mabutu who is experiencing trouble on his game ranch. The trouble is Dr. Blight, whose experiments turn ordinary cattle into "raging bulls", which threaten to destroy the entire region. She's also feeding hamburgers with a mind-control formula to Chief Kofi. When they go on a rampage, it is up to Captain Planet to hit the trail, corral the "bum steers", and defeat Dr. Blight and MAL. Note: First time Dr. Blight reveals the scarred portion of her face to the Planeteers. in one scene, Blight's face is mirrored.
46	20	"A Twist of Fate"	Jim Duffy	Story by : Mark W. Nelson and Doug Molitor; Teleplay by : Mark W. Nelson	February 29, 1992	210-212	N/A
During an earthquake in another country, a blow to Wheeler's head leaves him lost from the others and suffering from amnesia. He finds himself literally in the shoes of a homeless man, and learns that the only difference between himself and them is a simple twist of fate. Wheeler regains his memory and returns to help the other Planeteers call Captain Planet to save the girl who saved his life from a fire and another earthquake.
47	21	"The Great Tree Heist"	Jim Duffy	Story by : Nicholas Boxer; Teleplay by : Martha Moran	March 7, 1992	210-219	Hoggish Greedly and Rigger
The Planeteers travel to the Northwest after hearing about an old growth forest which is literally disappearing into thin air. After Wheeler sets out to investigate, along with an attractive local teenage bird watcher, Linka spots a "flying saucer" but they then discover that Hoggish Greedly is the pilot. They discover Greedly's scam -"Sucking up" five-hundred-year-old trees to make pressed board furniture. Production Code: 219
48	22	"Scorched Earth"	Jim Duffy	Doug Molitor	March 14, 1992	210-224	Zarm
The Planeteers again confront Zarm when he inhabits the body of a national dictator and implements a "Scorched Earth" policy to rid his country of interloping environmental activists eager to prevent development on the beach and forest areas. Zarm is revealed to have been behind every dictator in human history.
49	23	"The Hate Canal"	Jim Duffy	Ted Pedersen and Steve Hayes	March 21, 1992	210-225	Verminous Skumm
Verminous Skumm and a member of his Rat Pack use tainted cheese to infect Venetian canal rats with a deadly disease, which they then begin to spread throughout the city.
50	24	"Radiant Amazon"	Jim Duffy	Story by : Nicholas Boxer; Teleplay by : Ted Pedersen and Steve Hayes	March 28, 1992	210-218	Sly Sludge and Duke Nukem
Sly Sludge and Duke Nukem collaborate to dump toxic waste in the Amazon rainforest, imperiling Ma-Ti's village. Ma-Ti returns to see the Shaman and when the Planeteers arrive, they find the village in flames. Although they are able to extinguish the blaze, Ma-Ti is filled with anger. He slips away to capture the villains, but is captured himself and it is up to the other Planeteers to save him and summon Captain Planet to help defeat Sly Sludge and Duke Nukem.
51	25	"Fare Thee Whale"	Jim Duffy	Story by : Paul Dell & Steven Weiss; Teleplay by : Pat Allee & Ben Hurst	April 4, 1992	210-220	Dr. Blight, MAL and Looten Plunder
The Planeteers are shocked to see a mother whale killed during a whaling expedition engineered by Dr. Blight and Looten Plunder, but they are even more shocked to learn that it is legal, due to a loophole in the international laws, allowing whaling for the purpose of research. They set out to prove that Blight's research for a "whale repellent" is bogus, and are helped by a young Japanese teenager who is trying to dissuade his whaler father from working for Blight and Plunder.
52	26	"Utopia"	Jim Duffy	Pat Allee & Ben Hurst	April 11, 1992	210-226	Dr. Blight, MAL and Verminous Skumm
After being chided for watching futuristic thriller movies, Kwame suddenly finds himself and his fellow Planeteers fighting for survival in a surreal, gang-dominated world ruled by Skumm and Dr. Blight. When Dr. Blight turns the other Planeteers into punks, Kwame's only ally is Darian, leader of Utopia, the last unpolluted refuge on the planet.

=== Season 3 (1992) ===
The opening dialogue is changed to have Linka located in Eastern Europe, since the Soviet Union went defunct.

Special guest stars in this season include Don McLean, Kate Mulgrew, and Bob Weir.

No. overall	No. in season	Title	Written by	Original release date
53	1	"Greenhouse Planet"	Doug Molitor	September 12, 1992
When Dr. Blight convinces the President of the United States to let her create a fuel for a spaceship trip to Venus, the Planeteers try to change his mind by showing him the accelerated greenhouse effects from fuel's emissions. MAL however takes control of the rocket and sends Kwame, Ma-Ti and the President to crash land on Venus while an underpowered Captain Planet must save the rest of the Planeteers. Note: First time Captain Planet is formed without all 5 rings.
54	2	"A Creep from the Deep"	Pat Allee; Ben Hurst	September 19, 1992
The Planeteers must stop a rampaging giant squid from threatening a small fishing town after it is mutated by toxins from Sly Sludge's illegal waste dumping operation.
55	3	"The Deadly Glow"	Doug Molitor	September 26, 1992
The Planeteers are called into action to stop Duke Nukem from stealing radioactive minerals and using them for his own sinister purposes, and to save a town from being exposed to lethal amounts of radiation. Note: This episode is based on a real-life incident called the Goiânia accident, where a sample of highly toxic cesium-137 was misplaced from a recycled radiotherapy machine, sold, and resulted in the deaths of four people.
56	4	"A Perfect World"	Ted Pedersen; Steve Hayes	October 3, 1992
Dr. Blight takes on a paraplegic scientist named Dr. Derek. What Dr. Blight doesn't count on is the Planeteers calling Captain Planet who infects Blight's computer and gives MAL a computer virus.
57	5	"The Dream Machine"	Story by : Doug Molitor; Teleplay by : Sharon O’Mahony	October 10, 1992
Carlos, an Hispanic farm boy on a small island, becomes jealous of his cousin's return from the big city. He is given the power to wish for anything he wants from Zarm who calls himself the Dream Maker. To impress a girl that he likes and to get back at his cousin, Carlos wishes for things that will gain her interest. Soon, the whole town discovers the Dream Maker and they all want something big. Blinded by greed, the townspeople fail to realize that their natural resources are being drained in a flagrantly careless and destructive manner in order to create the things they wish for. They soon learn the effects of this, but the Planeteers need Captain Planet to get rid of Zarm and quell a near war between the townspeople and the villagers in the hills, who also want a piece of the Dream Maker. Special Guest Star: Oren Lyons
58	6	"Bitter Waters"	Story by : Doug Molitor; Teleplay by : Jim Aitken, Doug Molitor	October 17, 1992
Sky Runner returns to ask the Planeteers for help after Looten Plunder tricks his people into selling their lands for urban development. Special Guest Star: Robby Romero as Sky Runner.
59	7	"The Guinea Pigs"	Phil Harnage	October 24, 1992
Dr. Blight's minions have been capturing animals from Dr. Rice's animal shelter for her experiments that she runs under the nose of her employer Laurie Saunders. It's up to the Planeteers to stop her. Special Guest Stars: Lou Rawls as Dr. Rice and Vanna White as Laurie Saunders.
60	8	"OK at the Gunfight Corral"	Pat Allee; Ben Hurst	October 31, 1992
Hoggish Greedly, Rigger, and Sly Sludge travel back in time to create the biggest trash crisis in the Earth's history, and the only one who can stop them is Captain Planet. Note: Named loosely after the Gunfight at the O.K. Corral, a real historical event that happened around 1881 in Tombstone, Arizona.
61	9	"Canned Hunt"	Pat Allee; Ben Hurst	November 7, 1992
Hoggish Greedly is behind a "canned" hunt, and captures Captain Planet and the Planeteers.
62	10	"Hog Tide"	Story by : Nick Boxer, Dan Gottlieb; Teleplay by : Doug Molitor	November 14, 1992
Gaia tells the Planeteers about Captain Planet's first adventure in the 1940s, when he and the Planeteers before them stopped Hoggish Greedly's grandfather, Don Porkaloin from building developments too close to the ocean. To prepare for a Hurricane Kira, Porkaloin's lounge singer/scientist Betty Blight (Dr. Blight's grandmother) uses her moon manipulator to bring the hurricane to his shores. When the Planeteers of that time are formed, Captain Planet is summoned to save the day. Special Guest Star: Ed Begley, Jr. as Zoning Commissioner.
63	11	"A Formula for Hate"	Story by : Nick Boxer, Pat Allee, Ben Hurst; Teleplay by : Pat Allee, Ben Hurst	November 21, 1992
When a high school basketball player named Todd Andrews finds out he has HIV/AIDS, Verminous Skumm and one of his Rat Pack minions start rumors about the disease that turn Todd's schoolmates against him, hoping to spread the disease further. With help from the Planeteers and Todd's coach, Captain Planet exposes the truth about AIDS. Then Captain Planet stops Verminous Skumm and his minion from fleeing and hands them over to the approaching police officers. Note: This was one of the first times that an American animated series dealt with the issue of AIDS education. Special Guest Stars: Neil Patrick Harris as Todd Andrews, Danica McKellar as Lisa, and Elizabeth Taylor as Mrs. Andrews.
64	12	"If It's Doomsday, This Must Be Belfast"	Doug Molitor	November 28, 1992
The Planeteers go on separate missions across the world to prevent the detonation of three separate nuclear bombs in three major conflict zones between warring factions. Verminous Skumm and Duke Nukem are behind the plot of inciting hatred to get people into nuking each other as they challenge the Planeteers into trying to stop the factions before they destroy each other. The main story sees Wheeler arrive in Northern Ireland where the conflict is between the Protestants and the Catholics. Gi and Ma-Ti travel to Israel where tensions are high between Palestinians and Jews. Kwame and Linka travel to South Africa where the blacks and whites are raging battles. Note: The episode's portions set in Belfast have become a popular viral internet meme; its wildly inaccurate accents and depictions of the Troubles have been met with large degrees of mirth from Northern Ireland inhabitants, when originally released in the US it was viewed by the Northern Ireland government and banned from release in the third season run in Northern Ireland. Special Guest Star: Kenneth Mars as Moisha Lowkowitz.
65	13	"The Night of the Wolf"	Story by : Nick Boxer, Doug Molitor; Teleplay by : Doug Molitor	December 5, 1992
When Looten Plunder introduces the "Robo-Wolf", can the real wolves put a stop to it?

== The New Adventures of Captain Planet episodes ==
=== Season 4 (1993–94) ===
David Coburn does the opening narration instead of LeVar Burton.

Special guest stars in this season include Robby Benson, Mark Hamill, Helen Hunt, Robert Patrick, Brock Peters, Robert Picardo, and Lark Voorhies.

No. overall	No. in season	Title	Written by	Original release date
66	1	"A Mine Is a Terrible Thing to Waste Part One"	Story by : Nick Boxer, Sean Catherine Derek, Laren Bright; Teleplay by : Sean Catherine Derek, Laren Bright	September 11, 1993
While the Planeteers argue about their priorities concerning different ecological problems, Sly Sludge and Ooze dump waste in a salt mine as Sludge gains a new henchman named Tank Flusher III after briefly firing Ooze. Pausing their dispute Gaia assigns the Planeteers to intervene. Shortly after another ecological disaster takes place close to Commander Clash's island. Not being able to handle both at the same time, the Planeteers decide to summon Captain Planet for managing the latter, while themselves chasing after Sludge. However they do not notice, that the island's contamination revived Captain Pollution, who instantly starts a fight against Captain Planet. To make things worse, the Planeteers fall into Sly Sludge's trap, who traps them in the mine. This episode reveals some of Ma-Ti's past and thereby some of his motives for environmentalism. Note: First appearance of Sly Sludge's second henchman Tank Flusher III.
67	2	"A Mine Is a Terrible Thing to Waste Part Two"	Story by : Nick Boxer, Sean Catherine Derek, Laren Bright; Teleplay by : Laren Bright, Sean Catherine Derek	September 18, 1993
Captain Planet destroys Captain Pollution for good by throwing him in a natural lava vat. In addition, Kwame, Gi, Wheeler, and Linka each reveal some of their own past as they work to thwart Sly Sludge, Ooze, and Tank Flusher III.
68	3	"I Just Want to Be Your Teddy Bear"	Story by : Nick Boxer, Pat Allee, Ben Hurst; Teleplay by : Pat Allee, Ben Hurst	September 25, 1993
Hoggish Greedly is behind a mystery involving Louisiana black bears. The Planeteers call Captain Planet who puts an end to Greedly's evil plots.
69	4	"Missing Linka"	Story by : Nick Boxer, Sean Catherine Derek, Laren Bright; Teleplay by : Richard Mueller	October 2, 1993
Linka's Grandmother suffers from an undiagnosed illness, causing Linka to leave the Planeteers and return to her home town. Because half the town is affected, she investigates the reason of the problem. Wheeler, unable to abandon her, secretly stays in town – and helps Linka, as soon as the situation gets dangerous to her. Meanwhile the other Planeteers worry about getting her back. The Planeteers combine their powers to call Captain Planet to save Linka's town. Note: This is the first and only episode where Linka and Wheeler share a passionate kiss, and openly confirm their romantic feelings for each other.
70	5	"The Unbearable Blightness of Being"	Story by : Nick Boxer, Sean Catherine Derek, Laren Bright; Teleplay by : Pat Allee, Ben Hurst	October 9, 1993
Dr. Blight succeeds in constructing a machine, which switches the minds of two affected bodies. Using this machine, she gets into the body of Gaia (as well as Gaia gets into hers), in this way gaining Gaia's powers of nature and also fooling the Planeteers. Imprisoned in Blight's body, Gaia has to find and convince the Planeteers, if she wants her own body back.
71	6	"Wheeler's Ark"	Story by : Nick Boxer, Sean Catherine Derek, Laren Bright; Teleplay by : Reed Robbins	October 16, 1993
The Planeteers struggle with trying to return endangered species to their habitats as they are being destroyed by the Eco-Villains and other polluters. They end up rescuing far more animals than returning, much to Gaia's dismay.
72	7	"Sea No Evil"	Story by : Nick Boxer, Sean Catherine Derek, Laren Bright; Teleplay by : Reed Robbins	October 23, 1993
Gi is invited to a dolphin research center in which provides dolphins to Hoggish Greedly, who is behind a number of dolphins getting hurt due to his use of them to collect toxic waste from a submarine. Special Guest Stars: Ed Begley Jr. and Dionne Warwick
73	8	"Future Shock"	Story by : Dan Gottlieb, Nick Boxer; Teleplay by : Lane Raichert	October 30, 1993
Zarm travels to a possible heavily-polluted future timeline and rounds up the great-great-great-grandchildren of Dr. Blight, Looten Plunder, and Verminous Skumm from that future to take on Captain Planet and the Planeteers. They are no match for the Eco-Villains from the future even when the future Eco-Villains ally with Dr. Blight and Looten Plunder. They call Captain Planet, who gets trapped in a toxic acid bubble. Gaia summons the Planeteers from an unpolluted alternate future, who call their future Captain Planet. In the end, a small action from Ma-Ti involving saving a girl from a flood and the future Eco-Villains ends up securing the cleaner future, causing the polluted timeline to vanish and the future Eco-Villains to be erased while Dr. Blight, Looten Plunder, and Zarm get away. With Ma-Ti curious on why the future Eco-Villains targeted the girl, Gaia reveals to Ma-Ti that the girl will grow up to help make a cleaner future for Earth.
74	9	"I've Lost My Mayan"	Story by : Nick Boxer, Sean Catherine Derek, Laren Bright; Teleplay by : Rich Fogel, Mark Seidenberg	November 6, 1993
Transported to ancient Maya, Ma-Ti is captured and mistaken for the son of environmentally-minded rebels who are against a tyrannical chieftain named Shanoub. Special Guest Star: Héctor Elizondo as Shanoub.
75	10	"Talkin' Trash"	Nick Boxer, Sean Catherine Derek, Laren Bright; Based on a concept by : Joey Dedio	November 13, 1993
In this story about street gangs, Wheeler gets a letter from his hometown in New York with some bad news: his father, whom Wheeler never had a close relationship with, is ill. So Wheeler heads back to his hometown, where he bumps into his old friends. Among the friends Wheeler bumps into is Trish, who now goes by the nickname of "Trash", who has turned to crime. Her boss is none other than Verminous Skumm. Special Guest Stars: George Hearn as Wheeler's Dad, Marilyn McCoo as the TV News Reporter, and Marcia Wallace as Wheeler's Mom
76	11	"The Energy Vampire"	Story by : Nick Boxer, Sean Catherine Derek, Laren Bright; Teleplay by : Richard Mueller	November 20, 1993
Duke Nukem and Dr. Blight wreak havoc in Canada. Only Captain Planet can stop Nukem before he destroys the Earth. This episode parodies many classic horror films: Blight's hair makes her look like the Bride of Frankenstein, where Duke Nukem has bolts like Frankenstein's monster on his neck, Leadsuit walks around like Igor after an injury, and Duke even acts like King Kong at the end.
77	12	"Bottom Line Green"	Story by : Nick Boxer, Rich Fogel, Mark Seidenberg; Teleplay by : Sean Catherine Derek, Laren Bright	November 27, 1993
The Planeteers go undercover to investigate a series of mysterious explosions at a plant. It looks like the owner's son is behind them, but Hoggish Greedly is behind the explosions, and the Planeteers call Captain Planet, who puts an end to the mystery, and captures Greedly.
78	13	"Gorillas Will Be Missed"	Nick Boxer; Sean Catherine Derek; Laren Bright; Doug Molitor	February 5, 1994
Goki, a boy from the future where gorillas are extinct, is given a virtual reality goggle by a mysterious woman that sends him into the past around the time when Looten Plunder tries to get rid of some gorillas. With Goki's help, the Planeteers call Captain Planet to stop him. At the end, Goki receives the power of Earth as a Planeteer and the mysterious woman is revealed to be a form of Gaia. Special Guest Star: Kadeem Hardison as Goki.
79	14	"Bug Off"	Story by : Nick Boxer, Sean Catherine Derek, Laren Bright; Teleplay by : Reed Robbins	February 19, 1994
Vermenous Skumm plans to terrorize the earth with his wicked weevils. But Captain Planet stops him. Special Guest Star: Robert Guillaume
80	15	"You Bet Your Planet"	Story by : Nick Boxer, Sean Catherine Derek, Laren Bright; Teleplay by : Sean Catherine Derek, Laren Bright	February 26, 1994
This episode features a game show "You Bet Your Planet" in which the Planeteers competed against the Eco-Villains. The game show is hosted on an alien planet, with aliens for the audience and the host Lexo Starvak, and a big mouth for the announcer. The prize is the fate of Captain Planet. Special Guest Stars: Casey Kasem as Lexel Starvack and Gene Wood as Game Show Announcer. Note: The big mouth is re-used in the Season 6 opening sequence.
81	16	"Going Bats, Man"	Story by : Nick Boxer, Sean Catherine Derek, Laren Bright; Teleplay by : Reed Robbins	March 5, 1994
The Planeteers investigate a movie producer named Robin Plunder (who turns out to be the nephew of Looten Plunder) when the bats are being framed for terrorizing people. Captain Planet stops Robin in his tracks and expose his bat-discrediting plot.
82	17	"Jail House Flock"	Story by : Nick Boxer, Sean Catherine Derek, Laren Bright; Teleplay by : Sean Catherine Derek, Laren Bright	March 26, 1994
The Planeteers are shocked when Hoggish Greedley got a permit from an Army Corps of Engineers official (voiced by Kevin Conroy) to build houses by wetlands. When they tried to stop them, Greedley has them and Captain Planet arrested and thrown in jail. Greedley tricks the hick Sheriff (voiced by Sorrell Booke) that the Planeteers escaped from jail. So the Planeteers get some evidence to expose Greedley and free Captain Planet from jail.
83	18	"High Steaks"	Story by : Nick Boxer, Sean Catherine Derek, Laren Bright; Teleplay by : Sean Catherine Derek, Laren Bright	April 2, 1994
Looten Plunder is behind a plan to ruin an environmental sustainable ranching operation. The Planeteers call Captain Planet, who defeats Plunder and Plunder is hauled off to jail again. Special Guest Stars: Hoyt Axton as Big Ed Baker, Manu Tupou as Imoto, and Dennis Weaver as Dusty.
84	19	"Planeteers Under Glass"	Story by : Nick Boxer, Sean Catherine Derek, Laren Bright; Teleplay by : Von Williams, Jim Katz	April 23, 1994
Dr. Derek constructed a simulation of a condensed version of Earth, featuring different biodomes. It was an experiment to demonstrate the consequences of pollution and how it will destroy the world, simulating a few centuries in ninety minutes. The Planeteers are visiting the land containing mutated animals that each turn to stone with the scientist and plan to leave after 30 minutes, but Dr. Blight and MAL lock them in. The Planeteers cannot use their rings individually because the simulated world has an effect on them, but they can combine them to summon Captain Planet. However, Captain Planet cannot survive long in the world due to the intense pollution. The Planeteers and the scientist must find a way out, before it is too late.
85	20	"Orangu-Tangle"	David Ehrman	April 30, 1994
The Slaughters, a poaching mother/son team, abduct and sell baby orangutans, who need their mother to survive. When the police can't stop the Slaughters, the Planeteers call Captain Planet to stop the Slaughters. Note: First appearance of the Slaughters consisting of Mame Slaughter and her son Stalker Slaughter.
86	21	"No Horsing Around"	Story by : Nick Boxer, Sean Catherine Derek, Laren Bright, Dan Gottlieb; Teleplay by : Reed Robbins	May 7, 1994
Hoggish Greedly is behind an attempt to get rid of the horses as well as Ma-Ti and his native American friend, but is stopped by Captain Planet.
87	22	"'Teers in the 'Hood"	Nick Boxer, Sean Catherine Derek, Laren Bright; Idea and inspiration from : Ms. Metzler’s Class of 1992-93 West Fulton Middle School, Atlanta, Georgia	May 14, 1994
This episode dealt with gang violence, guns, and the peace messages of Martin Luther King Jr., John F. Kennedy, and Mohandas Gandhi, as well as their assassinations. An old friend of Gi's, a teacher, is caught up in a gang war and nearly killed, so the Planeteers infiltrate the two feuding gangs and try to put a stop to the cycle of violence, which may prove easier said than done. Note: In the first 10 minutes of the episode, Shaggy Rogers and Velma Dinkley from Scooby-Doo appear several times.

=== Season 5 (1994–95) ===
Special guest stars in this season include Dan Frischman, Robert Guillaume, Mark Hamill, Robert Patrick, Robert Picardo, and Lark Voorhies.

No. overall	No. in season	Title	Written by	Original release date	Prod. code
88	1	"Twilight Ozone"	Story by : Nick Boxer, Sean Catherine Derek, Laren Bright; Teleplay by : Sean Catherine Derek, Laren Bright, Lane Raichert	September 10, 1994	501
This exciting fifth series opener starts with a mystery. Animals are going blind. The Planeteers investigation leads to the depleting ozone layer and to Australia where a scientist is studying how to adapt to the harmful UV rays rather than work to reverse the damage. To make matters worse, the scientist is studying none other than Duke Nukem, who decides to turn up the heat when the Planeteers threaten to put an end to his sweet deal only for Captain Planet to cool his jets.
89	2	"Hollywaste"	Story by : Nick Boxer, Dan Gottlieb; Teleplay by : Sean Catherine Derek, Laren Bright	September 17, 1994	502
The Planeteers meet Dr. Blight's do-goody sister Bambi Blight who will be starring in an environmentally friendly movie. Unfortunately, Dr. Blight plans to ruin it. She binds and gags her sister and takes her place. However Bambi is able to escape and stop her sister's plan to destroy Captain Planet. Note: This episode features a little inside joke in the scene where Dr. Blight, posing as her sister, tries to wreck the film. Because Dr. Blight's acting is so bad, the scriptwriter tells the director that they'll get Kath Soucie to loop her voice later. Linka agrees with the idea, saying "I hope they get that Soucie person." Kath Soucie provided the voice for Linka as well as that of Bambi Blight. Featuring the voice of Arnold Stang as the Assistant Director
90	3	"The Ghost of Porkaloin Past"	Story by : Nick Boxer, Dan Gottlieb; Teleplay by : Sean Catherine Derek, Laren Bright	September 24, 1994	503
Hoggish Greedly inherits his grandfather Don Porkaloin's estate. But when he gets a hotel, he uses the cover as a legal operation but is stopped by Captain Planet. The groundskeeper Boaris is revealed to be Greedly's grandfather in disguise. After finding out what his grandson intends to do Porkaloin (who is revealed to be one of the world's top environmentalists after repenting from his pollution ways) is disgusted and instead gives the estate to Captain Planet and the Planeteers.
91	4	"The Disoriented Express"	Story by : Nick Boxer, Lane Raichert; Teleplay by : Sean Catherine Derek, Laren Bright	October 1, 1994	504
Dr. Blight kidnaps wealthy philanthropist Ella Salvador with the intention of preventing the implementation of a new smog reducing railway system in overcrowded Latin American cities (the city depicted resembles Santiago, Chile, specifically). Only Captain Planet can stop Dr. Blight. Special Guest Star: Rita Moreno as Ella Salvador
92	5	"Horns A' Plenty"	Story by : Nick Boxer, Dan Gottlieb; Teleplay by : Sean Catherine Derek, Laren Bright	November 5, 1994	505
The Planeteers split up to stop 2 plots involving rhinoceros horns: Looten Plunder and Argos Bleak distributing them and the Slaughter Family poaching rhinos for their horns. Upon learning that they have the same goal in rhino horns and their mutual dislike of the Planeteers, Looten and Argos bust out Mame and Stalker to set up a trap for the Planeteers. Special Guest Star: Tristan Rogers as Caucasian Patrol Member
93	6	"A River Ran Through It"	Story by : Nick Boxer, Sean Catherine Derek, Laren Bright; Teleplay by : Sean Catherine Derek, Laren Bright	November 12, 1994	506
Hoggish Greedly starts a war between workers in a town. The Planeteers call Captain Planet who puts an end to the feud when he captures Greedly. Special Guest Star: David Ackroyd and Ken Howard
94	7	"No Place Like Home"	Story by : Nick Boxer, Sean Catherine Derek, Laren Bright; Teleplay by : Sean Catherine Derek, Laren Bright	November 19, 1994	507
Dr. Blight makes Gaia mortal when she tries to rescue some wolves and leaves Captain Planet and the Planeteers powerless. When mortal, Gaia experiences the life and struggles of the homeless when she meets a homeless woman. Special Guest Stars: Héctor Elizondo and Brenda Vaccaro
95	8	"Little Crop of Horrors"	Story by : Nick Boxer, Sean Catherine Derek, Laren Bright; Teleplay by : Laura Shrock	November 26, 1994	508
A vine designed by nature to control the rate of erosion is altered by Dr. Blight using a stolen growth enhancement ray which she stole from Dr. Georgina Carbor. When the vine mutates into a plant monster when placed in Dr. Blight's eco-system, it's up to Captain Planet to stop it. Special Guest Star: Cree Summer as Dr. Georgina Carbor
96	9	"In Zarm's Way"	Story by : Ron Myrick, Nick Boxer; Teleplay by : Sean Catherine Derek, Laren Bright	February 4, 1995	509
Zarm makes a bet with Gi after she claims that children are not born with hate, placing two neighboring children in a computer simulation where they can shape the world via thought, along with the shrunken Planeteers, threatening to expose the children to a traffic accident if Gi loses. Zarm allows the kids' feuding parents to influence them, causing the children to turn on each other, but the Planeteers and Captain Planet show them the error of their ways. Note: Last appearance of Zarm. Special Guest Stars: Page Leong as Chi, Marshall Higa as Li, Malinda Williams as Michelle
97	10	"No Small Problem"	Story by : Nick Boxer, Dan Gottlieb; Teleplay by : Sean Catherine Derek, Laren Bright	February 11, 1995	510
Sly Sludge shrinks the Planeteers using a shrink ray built by Dr. Blight and sends them to a dump. There, they build a plane, but the shrinking ray is wearing off, and the Planeteers call Captain Planet, who saves the Planeteers, and closes down Sludge's operations. Note #1: By the time Sludge's operations closed down once and for all, he redeemed himself along with Ooze and Tank Flusher III. Note #2: Last appearances of Sly Sludge, Ooze, and Tank Flusher III.
98	11	"Numbers Game"	Story by : Nick Boxer, Dan Gottlieb; Teleplay by : Sean Catherine Derek, Laren Bright	February 18, 1995	511
It's Wheeler's birthday and a trip to Coney Island is delayed due to an eco-emergency. So instead they go to an Eco Park. Wheeler, who is tired, falls asleep in the tunnel of love with Linka. He dreams that he is a father with 8 kids and one on the way. Hope Island is destroyed by over consumption, but the other Planeteers and Captain Planet don't care anymore.
99	12	"Nothing's Sacred"	Story by : Nick Boxer, Dan Gottlieb; Teleplay by : Douglas Booth	February 25, 1995	512
Vermanous Skumm steals a sacred artifact from a cave, but it is returned to its rightful owners by Captain Planet and the Planeteers.
100	13	"Who's Running the Show?"	Story by : Nick Boxer, Dan Gottlieb; Teleplay by : Laura Shrock	May 13, 1995	513
Dr. Blight, Duke Nukem, Verminous Skumm, and Hoggish Greedly hijack a national television network and fill it with their own pro-pollution propaganda, the Planeteers arrive to cut their transmission and schemes short, but things escalate when Duke Nukem insists on dropping a nuclear missile for the cameras. Note #1: Duke Nukem may had been presumed deceased after Captain Planet froze him turning into rock. Note #2: Last appearances of Duke Nukem and Verminous Skumm. Note #3: When the Planeteers are going on stage, they wear costumes which are the same outfits that characters in The Flintstones wear. Special Guest Stars: Ted Turner as Fred Lerner and Jonathan Winters as Eco the Clown

=== Season 6 (1995–96) ===
This is notable that in season six, the opening dialog was replaced by a new rap theme. Unaired in the United States, until Boomerang finally aired it on April 22, 2006. In addition, all voice actors are credited by their roles and by episode.

No. overall	No. in season	Title	Written by	Original release date	Prod. code
101	1	"An Eye for an Eye"	Story by : Nick Boxer; Teleplay by : Sean Catherine Derek, Laren Bright	September 9, 1995	601
Hoggish Greedly is behind a scheme to wipe out all the river dolphins in existence, but the Planeteers call Captain Planet, who stops Greedly.
102	2	"Whoo Gives a Hoot"	Story by : Nick Boxer; Teleplay by : Sean Catherine Derek, Laren Bright	September 23, 1995	
The Planeteers and a man named Jake have three days to prove to a judge that Looten Plunder is cutting down old growth forests which is affecting the local owl population. Wheeler falls into the river and the Planeteers call Captain Planet who rescues Wheeler. After the judge is given proof that she has been tricked, our heroes lose the battle as Looten Plunder and the Pinehead Brothers had finished cutting down a growth forest. When Jake notes that the owl he treated needs an old growth forest to florish, Plunder states that he is going to another old growth forest in the distance as he dares the Planeteers, Jake, and the judge to try and stop him again as Plunder and the Pinehead Brothers take their leave.
103	3	"Frog Day Afternoon"	Story by : Nick Boxer, Sean Catherine Derek, Laren Bright; Teleplay by : Laura Shrock	October 7, 1995	603
Dr. Blight steals frogs from their habitat, but are returned with encouragement from Captain Planet who ties Blight up.
104	4	"Five Ring Panda-Monium"	Story by : Michael Wagner, Nick Boxer; Teleplay by : Michael Wagner, Reed Robbins	November 4, 1995	604
The Planeteers join the circus to rescue some abused animals after they were abducted by the Slaughters. Note: Final appearance of the Slaughters. Special Guest Star: Paul Williams as Kujo.
105	5	"A Good Bomb Is Hard to Find"	Nick Boxer, Sean Catherine Derek, Laren Bright	November 11, 1995	605
The Planeteers attempt to prevent past and future versions of Dr. Blight from selling a nuclear bomb to a German dictator strongly implied to be Adolf Hitler. Doctor Blight is ultimately responsible for the Hiroshima bombings as the result of a paradox. Special Guest Star: Matt Frewer as Adolf Hitler
106	6	"Dirty Politics"	Story by : Nick Boxer, Sean Catherine Derek, Laren Bright; Teleplay by : Laura Shrock	November 18, 1995	606
In the future, Hoggish Greedly, Looten Plunder, and Dr. Blight are older but not wiser. They also trapped their time period's versions of the Planeteers. With help from MAL, Dr. Blight's daughter Betsi Blight comes to the past to help the Planeteers stop Dr. Blight from winning the US Presidency as Rigger and MAL side with the Planeteers against them. Special Guest Star: Melissa Manchester as Jane Green.
107	7	"Old Ma River"	Story by : Nick Boxer; Teleplay by : Sean Catherine Derek, Laren Bright	November 25, 1995	607
The Planeteers travel to India. All of them get sick except for Wheeler, who decides to investigate the sickness in the city with the help of an Indian woman named Lita.
108	8	"One of the Gang"	Story by : Nick Boxer, Dan Gottlieb; Teleplay by : Bill Matheny, Sean Catherine Derek, Laren Bright	January 27, 1996	608
After saving a rich man's life in a boat storm, Señor Cisneros treats the Planeteers to a stay at his luxurious hotel. When a hotel policeman mistakes Ma-Ti as a local riffraff, Ma-Ti decides to clear his head and visit the poor community. He meets up with a boy who can't read and is threatened by a gang who burns his parents' store.
109	9	"Twelve Angry Animals"	Story by : Nick Boxer, Sean Catherine Derek, Laren Bright; Teleplay by : Rich Fogel, Mark Seidenberg	February 3, 1996	609
The Planeteers are trapped in a terrible blizzard while journeying up Mount Everest. They are led by a wisecracking snow leopard named 'Heather' into an ice cavern where they think they will be safe. But, as it turns out, the cavern is actually a courtroom, and the Planeteers (as well as the rest of humanity) are judged for committed crimes against their fellow species. The Planeteers are all taken back to the times when the species were either hunted or had their homes devastated, resulting in endangerment or worse, extinction. When the Planeteers plead guilty, the Yeti sentences them to help humanity remember their mistakes. They are then ejected from the cave and call Captain Planet to save them from the windy caves. After departing while losing the footage of the Yeti, the Planeteers get one final look at the snow leopard as it quotes "Remember". Featuring the voice of Tony Jay as the talking Yeti that judges humanity and Brock Peters as a woolly mammoth in the courtroom.
110	10	"Never the Twain Shall Meet"	Story by : Nick Boxer, Dan Gottlieb, Laren Bright; Teleplay by : Sean Catherine Derek	February 10, 1996	610
The Planeteers head South to meet their pal Milton who plans to show them all he's doing to preserve the endangered Mississippi River. But Wheeler and Ma-Ti don't want a guided tour as they have delusions of experiencing the Mississippi like Huckleberry Finn and Tom Sawyer did in the old days. Special Guest Star: Earl Holliman as Milton.
111	11	"Delta Gone"	Story by : Nick Boxer, Dan Gottlieb, Sean Catherine Derek; Teleplay by : Laren Bright	February 17, 1996	611
Looten Plunder and Hoggish Greedly try to destroy the African wetlands with their mining and cattle business, but are stopped by Captain Planet and the Planeteers. Note: Last appearance of Looten Plunder.
112	12	"Greed Is the Word"	Story by : Nick Boxer, Dan Gottlieb; Teleplay by : Sean Catherine Derek, Laren Bright	February 24, 1996	612
Hoggish Greedly is behind a scheme to get rid of the manatees, but the Planeteers call Captain Planet, who defeats Greedly and saves the manatees. Special Guest Star: Fred Schneider as Danny Dazzleduff.
113	13	"101 Mutations"	Story by : Nick Boxer; Teleplay by : Sean Catherine Derek, Laren Bright	May 11, 1996	613
Dr. Blight is running a puppy mill selling sick animals.

=== OK K.O.! Let's Be Heroes crossover (2017) ===
No. overall	No. in season	Title	Animation direction by	Written and storyboarded by	Original release date	Prod. code	U.S viewers (millions)
114	1	"The Power Is Yours"	Chang-woo Shin	Dave Alegre and Haewon Lee	October 9, 2017	1044-031	1.29
When Lord Boxman and the Eco Villainess Dr. Blight are trashing the Plaza with pollutants, Planeteer Kwame (the only member of the Planeteers who is still active in environmental work) swings in and recruits K.O., Rad, Enid and the quarreling team of Brandon and A Real Magic Skeleton to wield the elemental rings and take back the ecosystem! Special Guests: LeVar Burton as Kwame and David Coburn as Captain Planet Note: The events of the crossover specials take place after the final episode of the series.
