= Red Thunder =

Red Thunder may refer to:

- 45th Fires Brigade (United States), nicknamed Red Thunder
- Red Thunder, chief of the Yanktonai Dakotas and father of Wanata
- Red Thunder (musical group), a rock band formed in 1990 with Native American influences
- Tonnere Rouge (Red Thunder, or Wuckiew Nutch) chief of the Sussitongs of the Lac de la Grosse Roche
- Red Thunder (novel), a 2003 science fiction novel by John Varley
- Red Thunder, a newspaper of the militant Maoist Communist Party of Manipur in India
- Red Thunder Cloud, last native speaker of the Catawba Indian language
- Clint Frazier, an American professional baseball outfielder nicknamed "Red Thunder"
