= Barbara Pyle =

American producer, filmmaker and environmentalist (born 1947)

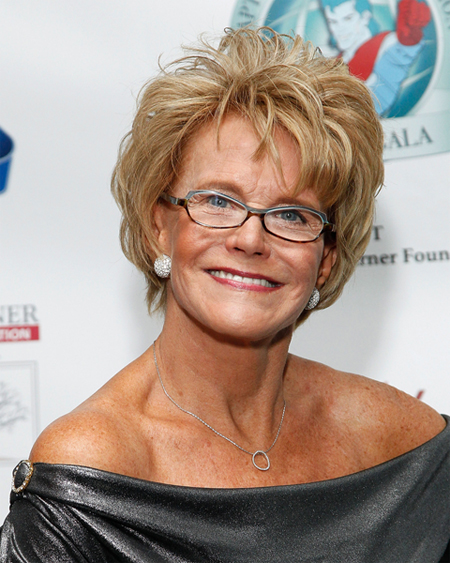
- Born: Barbara Y. E. Pyle; August 22, 1947 (age 79); Pauls Valley, Oklahoma, U.S.
- Education: Newcomb College of Tulane University, Phi Beta Kappa and King's College London
- Known for: Media, environmental activism, film making, photography, social media
- Awards: United Nations Environment Programme's Sasakawa Prize, Global 500 Roll of Honour (Inaugural Member), United Nations 100 Most Influential People, United Nations Imminent Person, David R. Brower Journalism Award (Sierra Club), National Association of Environmental Educators President's Award, Earth Summit Award, Aveda Environmentalist of the Year, Planned Parenthood Foundation Special Maggie Award for Outstanding Media Coverage of Reproductive Health and Rights, Rome Reportage Human Rights Award (Italy)

Barbara Y. E. Pyle (born August 22, 1947) is an American executive producer, filmmaker and environmental activist. She co-created and served as the executive producer on the animated series Captain Planet and the Planeteers and is the founder of the Captain Planet Foundation. She is currently a supporter and driving force for the Planeteer Movement, a worldwide effort of fans of the series to raise environmental awareness, based on the values of its main character, Captain Planet. She also is co-founder of one of the country’s first legal abortion facilities.

== Film career ==
=== Executive producer ===
Barbara Pyle first met Ted Turner in 1980 when she was photographing the America's Cup for Time magazine and the media mogul was helming the Courageous for the last time. Turner, impressed with Pyle's media savvy and commitment to environmental issues, hired her as Vice President of Environmental Policy at TBS. Pyle served over two decades in this role and was responsible for creation of the Turner Environment Division and setting the company's environmental broadcast agenda.

Pyle branded TBS as the Environmental Network. Simultaneously, she was CNN's environmental editor where she introduced and oversaw environmental news reporting and programming on both CNN and TBS. As one of the first environmental corporate executives, she championed Corporate Social Responsibility (CSR) policies and initiatives company-wide and set the standards for energy efficiency, recycling and carpooling with her department's award-winning Clean Air Commute program.

While at CNN/TBS, Pyle introduced and oversaw environmental coverage, including Earth Matters, a daily environmental news show which premiered on CNN in 1981 and launched "CNN's World Report", which featured international journalists presenting breaking news from their countries vis-à-vis their local perspective. With Jane Fonda serving as host, Pyle executive produced the award-winning show People Count which put a face on global issues addressed by a series of United Nations summits.

=== Media activist ===
In 1980, after she read The Global 2000 Report to the President commissioned by Jimmy Carter's presidential administration, Pyle committed herself to bring global concerns to the forefront of public attention. Pyle has worked with and built collaborative relationships between major environmental groups such as the United Nations Environment Programme, National Wildlife Federation, National Audubon Society, and Natural Resources Defense Council.

Pyle's activism was grounded in media production. Her 35-part documentary series People Count, hosted by Jane Fonda, profiled everyday people from around the world working to address issues of sustainable development, population, and the rights of women and native peoples. Pyle traveled around the world to film this series, acting both as executive producer and reporter. People Count aired domestically on CNN and TBS, and internationally on CNN International. To extend the audience further, People Count segments were distributed free through an international distribution program that reached broadcasters in over 180 countries with a potential viewing audience of two billion.

Broadcast to more than 80 countries and viewed by more than one billion people, Pyle's film The Day of Five Billion, co-produced with the United Nations Population Fund (UNFPA), featured original music videos by renowned artists from around the world combined with mini-documentaries and messages from international leaders and futurist authors. The Day of Five Billion featured a video representing the birth of the five billionth person on earth. Participating in the film were world leaders such as President of Costa Rica Óscar Arias, Prime Minister of Norway Gro Harlem Brundtland, President of Indonesia Suharto, Chinese Premier Zhao Ziyang, as well as music legends Peter Gabriel, Crowded House, Jimmy Cliff, Stevie Wonder, The Neville Brothers, Allen Toussaint, Clarence Clemons, Dr. John, Nona Hendryx, Youssou N'Dour and renowned authors Isaac Asimov, Arthur C. Clarke, and Kurt Vonnegut amongst many others. This celebration expanded into the annually celebrated World Population Day. The film received numerous accolades, including a Population Institute Global Media Award, a CINDY Award from the International Association of Audio Visual Communicators (IAAVC), a Silver Hugo Award as well as nominations for CableACE and Emmy awards.

Pyle's Without Borders expanded her distribution network to 127 countries and included a satellite grant from Intelsat.

Her film One Child - One Voice was the centerpiece of the United Nations' Save the Earth media campaign. This film initiated a letter-writing campaign in support of the United Nations Earth Summit in Rio de Janeiro. The film was distributed to over 100 countries and more than one million 'leaf postcards' were received from around the world for the Tree of Life in Rio.

For her professional work, humanitarian efforts and activism, Barbara has received dozens of personal commendations. Then Secretary-General of the United Nations Kofi Annan, when presenting the United Nations Sasakawa Award to Pyle, remarked: "For more than two decades, Barbara Pyle has encouraged the media to assume a major responsibility for informing and educating the public, including decision makers. Pyle has brought environmental issues closer to the hearts and minds of people the world over. As a writer, director and producer of numerous television programs, she has inspired countless individuals to care about the environment and to take responsibility for its protection."

== Captain Planet ==
In 1989, Pyle and Ted Turner together conceived the series Captain Planet and the Planeteers. Pyle and her team, which consisted of Nick Boxer and Thom Beers, intended to produce an animated series that could yield a generation of environmentally-literate youth. The characters on the show became the world's first eco-superheroes. Pyle based the five Planeteers on real-life people who inspired her during the show's pre-production, in 1989.

The series launched in September 1990 and ran for six seasons with a total of 113 episodes. Featuring celebrity voices such as Whoopi Goldberg, LeVar Burton, Meg Ryan, Jeff Goldblum, Tim Curry, Ed Asner, John Ratzenberger, Martin Sheen, and Dean Stockwell, the series was met with critical acclaim and became massively popular amongst youth. The series was No. 1 in Nielsen ratings for five consecutive years, was syndicated in 220 U.S. markets and aired in over 100 countries. Pyle required that the series' merchandising was made sustainably.

The series first season was released on DVD on April 19, 2011, and a feature film has been announced by Cartoon Network, which, as of November 2019 and despite further attempts in 2013 and 2016, has not yet come to any results. Despite this, the series came back on TV in 2017, via a crossover episode of OK K.O.! Let's Be Heroes entitled "The Power Is Yours", after one of Captain Planet's catchphrases. Many of the voice actors reprised their roles from the show.

=== Captain Planet Foundation ===
Using a percentage of Captain Planet's merchandising proceeds, Pyle founded the Captain Planet Foundation (CPF) to put the messages of the show into practice. Its mission was to teach young people to respect the planet through hands-on experiences. Today, the CPF awards grants to various projects that promote environmental awareness, teamwork, and community building.

Pyle served as the CPF's chairman of the board from 1991 to 2001. She currently has a seat on the board of directors and chairs its media committee.

=== Planeteer Movement ===
The Planeteer Movement is a worldwide gathering of young people who work to put the show's messages into practice.

Fans would self identify as Planeteers to Pyle, relating their personal tales of the series' effect on their lives. Inspired and humbled by the global impact of the show, in 2009 Pyle began investigating how she could connect the large number of fans with each other through the Internet. In two years of seeking out social media experts and serving on various panels, Barbara constructed a team that began work on what would become the Planeteer Movement.

In honor of Captain Planet's 20th anniversary, in 2010 the Planeteer team built a website and created a social media presence for fans of the series. The team aimed to blend fan service with environmental innovation and give fans around the world the chance to tell their Planeteer story, connect with others, and promote their environmental service projects and experiences that intend to lead to a sustainable future.

Barbara continues to attend high-level conferences, host meetups and introduce real-life Planeteers to each other to sustain the movement's growth. With half a million fans and dozens of Planeteer Networks worldwide, Pyle sees the movement as a force for positive change in the 21st century.

== Photojournalism ==
Prior to her two decades with TBS/CNN, Barbara Pyle was a photojournalist producing photo essays for NBC News, both nationally and locally in New York. She has three Time magazine covers to her credit and has been a major contributor to ten books.

She has traveled the world as a photojournalist and filmmaker in over 100 countries, to capture the human spirit in film. Pyle has photographed major news, events and personalities.

One of her most famous subjects is Bruce Springsteen and the E Street Band. She documented their work in the studio as they created their breakthrough album Born to Run and accompanied them on the tour, photographing them at the beginning of their meteoric rise to stardom.

In 2009, in association with Photographers Against Hunger, Pyle donated two of her rarely seen photos of Springsteen and the band to benefit the New Jersey Food Bank, a pet cause of the iconic singer. Pyle donated Dawn Rehearsal, a rarely seen black and white portrait of the exhausted band after a 3-day recording session before embarking on the Born to Run tour. The second donated photo, My Home Town, was taken in 1975 after leaving Pyle's childhood home in Pauls Valley, Oklahoma.

== Philanthropist ==
After leaving CNN/TBS, Pyle concentrated on running the Barbara Pyle Foundation (BPF) which she established in 1997 with the financial portion of her Sasakawa Prize.

The mission of the BPF is to harness the power of positive media communication to make a better world. BPF supports environmental programs and projects that improve the well-being of marginalized peoples. In the past, BPF has awarded grants for projects focused on sustainability and empowerment of women. Currently, BPF has implemented an invitation-only grant making policy.

Pyle cofounded Earth Secure with writer Marc Barasch and one of their first projects was One Child - One Voice which conveyed the plea to protect the planet in the voice of five children from around the world to promote the United Nations World Summit on Sustainable Development (Earth Summit). To encourage world leaders to participate in the summit and raise awareness of the issues, Earth Secure initiated a Tree of Life campaign. Over a million people worldwide sent postcards with a leaf drawn on them to serve as a call to action to their leaders. These postcards were hung from an enormous Tree of Life as a visual testament of support for the Earth Summit's goals and a reminder to its delegates that the world's voice was with them.

== Executive board work ==
Pyle serves on various boards of philanthropic organizations such as:

- Captain Planet Foundation, (chair of brand and media committee)
- Mother Nature Network, (board of advisors)
- Population Media Center, (board of advisors)
- Counterpart International (advisory committee)
- GreenLaw (advisory board)

In the past, Pyle worked with:

- World Business Council for Sustainable Development - WBCSD - (Represented Time Warner/Ted Turner)
- The Bellagio Center, Bellagio Forum for Sustainable Development - BFSD - (honorary board member)
- United Nations Environment Programme, North American advisory board
- United Nations Development Programme, United States committee member

== Reproductive rights ==
In July 1971, Pyle and Dr. Horace Hale Harvey III opened the Center for Reproductive and Sexual Health in New York City. The clinic was, at the time, the largest free-standing abortion facility in the world and the opening was scheduled to coincide with the first day that abortion up to 24 weeks became legal under a newly enacted New York State law. Pyle served as the clinic's first administrator.
