= Captain Planet and the Planeteers =

American animated television series

- Also known as: The New Adventures of Captain Planet
- Genre: Superhero fiction; Action-adventure; Edutainment
- Created by: Ted Turner; Barbara Pyle
- Developed by: Nicholas Boxer; Thom Beers; Andy Heyward; Robby London; Barbara Pyle; Bob Forward; Cassandra Schafhausen
- Written by: Doug Molitor (seasons 1–3); Sean Catherine Derek (seasons 4–6); Laren Bright (seasons 4–6)
- Directed by: Will Meugniot (season 1); Jim Duffy (seasons 1–2); Stan Phillips (seasons 1 and 3); Vincent Davis (season 1); Marsha Goodman (voice director) (seasons 1–3)
- Voices of: David Coburn; LeVar Burton; Joey Dedio; Kath Soucie; Janice Kawaye; Scott Menville; Frank Welker; Whoopi Goldberg (seasons 1–3); Margot Kidder (seasons 4–6)
- Composers: Tom Worrall (seasons 1–3); Thomas Chase Jones (seasons 4–6); Steve Rucker (seasons 4–6)
- Country of origin: United States
- Original language: English
- No. of seasons: 6
- No. of episodes: 113 (list of episodes)

Production
- Executive producers: Andy Heyward (seasons 1–3); Robby London (seasons 1–3); Barbara Pyle; Nicholas Boxer (seasons 2-4)
- Producers: Cos Anzilotti (seasons 4–6); Larry Houston (season 1); Jim Duffy (season 2); Stan Phillips (season 3)
- Running time: 23 minutes
- Production companies: DIC Enterprises (seasons 1–3); Hanna-Barbera Cartoons (seasons 4–6); Turner Program Services

Original release
- Network: TBS; Syndication
- Release: September 15, 1990 – May 11, 1996

Captain Planet and the Planeteers, commonly referred to as simply Captain Planet, is an American animated environmentalist superhero television series created by Barbara Pyle and Ted Turner and developed by Pyle, Nicholas Boxer, Thom Beers, Andy Heyward, Robby London, Bob Forward, and Cassandra Schafausen. The series was produced by Turner Program Services and DIC Enterprises and broadcast on TBS and in syndication from September 15, 1990, to December 5, 1992.

A sequel series titled The New Adventures of Captain Planet was produced by Hanna-Barbera Cartoons, Inc., distributed by Turner Program Services and broadcast from September 11, 1993, to May 11, 1996. The series was later rerun on Kids' WB!, Cartoon Network and Boomerang. It is currently on the MeTV Toons schedule. The series is a form of edutainment that advocates for environmentalism and is known for having several famous actors voice the villains. It spawned a franchise consisting of eco-friendly toys, comic books, video games, and a public charity to further promote its work.

== Plot ==
Our world is in peril. Gaia, the spirit of the Earth can no longer stand the terrible destruction plaguing our planet. She sends five magic rings to five special young people. From Africa, Kwame with the power of earth. From North America, Wheeler with the power of fire. From the Soviet Union (later Eastern Europe), Linka with the power of wind. From Asia, Gi with the power of water. And from South America, Ma-Ti with the power of heart. With the five powers combined they summon Earth's greatest champion - CAPTAIN PLANET!

— Opening narration, by LeVar Burton

Each episode is followed by at least one "Planeteer Alert" clip, often connected to the plot, which discusses environmental-political and social-political issues and how the viewer can contribute and be part of "the solution" rather than "the pollution".

== Characters ==
=== Captain Planet ===
In situations that the Planeteers cannot resolve alone, they can combine their planetary powers to summon the titular Captain Planet (voiced by David Coburn), who is Ma-Ti's magnified heart power in the form of a humanoid avatar with blue skin and green hair. He possesses the Planeteers' amplified powers, along with flight and superhuman strength.

Captain Planet's weaknesses are pollution and smog. When he comes in contact with either, his powers are weakened and he has to return to the earth to recover.

=== Planeteers ===
The Planeteers. Clockwise from top left: Gi, Kwame, Linka, Ma-Ti, and Wheeler.

The Planeteers are a group chosen by Gaia to protect the planet from environmental disasters and to educate humanity to prevent further disasters. Gaia uses her "Planet Vision" in the Crystal Chamber to discover where destruction is occurring, which is usually caused by the Eco-Villains, and sends the Planeteers to help solve the problem. The Planeteers use solar-powered transportation, usually the Geo-Cruiser, to avoid causing pollution themselves.

- Kwame (voiced by LeVar Burton) – From Africa, Kwame has the power of earth.
- Wheeler (voiced by Joey Dedio) – From Brooklyn, New York City, United States, Wheeler has the power of fire.
- Linka (voiced by Kath Soucie) – From the Soviet Union (changed to "Eastern Europe" from Season 3 onward), (Note: The location change occurred due to dissolution of the Soviet Union.) Linka has the power of wind.
- Gi (voiced by Janice Kawaye) – From Asia, Gi has the power of water.
- Ma-Ti (voiced by Scott Menville) – From Brazil, Ma-Ti has the power of heart. Ma-Ti was raised by his tribe's shaman.
  - Suchi (vocal effects provided by Frank Welker) - Ma-Ti's pet spider monkey.

=== Gaia ===
Gaia (voiced by Whoopi Goldberg in seasons 1–3, Margot Kidder in seasons 4–6) is the spirit of Earth, whose physical manifestation is that of a dark-skinned woman. She sends five magic rings to five chosen youths from around the world. Four of the rings have the power to control an element of nature (earth, fire, wind, and water), and one controls the element of Heart. Gaia claims to have been asleep throughout the 20th century and to have awakened to a more polluted world than when she was last awake; however, this is contradicted by a flashback episode set in the 1920s in which people receive guidance from her. She draws inspiration from Gaia, the goddess of the earth in Greek mythology.

=== Villains ===
==== Eco-Villains ====
The Eco-Villains are a group of antagonists, each representing a particular way of thinking that can cause ecological problems. They endanger the planet through pollution, deforestation, poaching, and other activities that harm the environment in order to gain wealth, land, or power. While they usually work alone, they are willing to work together when it suits their plans. The only time they work as a team is in "Summit to Save Earth" where they are led by Zarm.

- Hoggish Greedly (voiced by Ed Asner) – A large pig-faced man who represents the dangers of overconsumption and greed and is the first villain that Captain Planet and the Planeteers encounter. "Smog Hog" reveals that he has a son, Hoggish Greedly Jr. (voiced by Charlie Schlatter), who is negatively affected by his polluting Road Hog plot. As a result, Greedly is forced to work with Captain Planet to save him. "Hog Tide" reveals that his grandfather Don Porkaloin (also voiced by Asner) was defeated by another group of Planeteers in the past and later became environmentally friendly as shown in "The Ghost of Porkaloin Past".
  - Rigger (voiced by John Ratzenberger) – Greedly's main henchman. Though he sometimes questions Greedly's orders and is concerned when his actions hurt the environment, he remains loyal to him. In "The Ghost of Porkaloin Past", Rigger claims that the main reason he works for him is because no one would hire him.
- Verminous Skumm (voiced by Jeff Goldblum in season 1, Maurice LaMarche in season 2–5) – A humanoid rat-like creature who represents urban blight, disease, and drug abuse. He can control rats and has a personal helicopter called the Scum O'Copter.
  - Rat Pack – A group of humanoid rats who work for Skumm.
- Duke Nukem (voiced by Dean Stockwell in seasons 1–3, Maurice LaMarche in seasons 4–5) – A doctor who transformed himself into a radioactive rock-skinned mutant and represents the misuse of nuclear power. He generates radiation, which he can use to fire radioactive blasts from his hands, and possesses x-ray vision. Apogee temporarily renamed the eponymous character of Duke Nukem to "Duke Nukum" to avoid possible trademark claims from the producers of Captain Planet. However, the character was later found to be under no trademark and the games were restored to their original titles.
  - Leadsuit (voiced by Frank Welker) – Duke Nukem's henchman,who wears a full-bodied lead hazmat suit to withstand the radiation released by Nukem's body. He claims that he works for Nukem because he will become second-in-command when he takes over the world.
- Dr. Barbara "Babs" Blight (voiced by Meg Ryan in 1990–1991, Mary Kay Bergman in 1992–1996, Tessa Auberjonois in OK K.O.! Let's Be Heroes) – A mad scientist who represents the dangers of uncontrolled technology and unethical scientific experimentation. As a result of self-experimentation, the left side of her face is scarred and is usually hidden by her hair. "Hog Tide" reveals that her grandmother Betty Blight assisted Don Porkaloin in the past. "Hollywaste" reveals that she has a sister named Bambi (voiced by Kath Soucie).
  - MAL (voiced by David Rappaport in 1990, Tim Curry in 1991–1996) – Dr. Blight's A.I. husband and henchman. He has the ability to hack into other computer systems, allowing him to take them over and reprogram them. MAL is often the control and main power source for everything in Blight's labs and the vehicles she travels in.
- Looten Plunder (voiced by James Coburn in seasons 1–3, Ed Gilbert in seasons 4–6) – A wealthy poacher and corrupt businessman who represents the evils of unethical business actions. He is also shown to have a nephew named Robin Plunder.
  - Argos Bleak (voiced by S. Scott Bullock) – Looten Plunder's main henchman and bodyguard who also works as a mercenary and does most of his dirty work. He usually travels in helicopters or other aircraft and is proficient in handling firearms. Argos Bleak once operated on his own in "The Predator", where he targeted basking sharks in Florida.
  - Pinehead Brothers (voiced by Dick Gautier and Frank Welker) – Oakey and Dokey are lumberjacks who serve as Looten Plunder's henchmen in the sixth season.
- Sly Sludge (voiced by Martin Sheen in Seasons 1–3, Jim Cummings in Seasons 4–5) – An unscrupulous waste collector who represents laziness, ignorance, and the dangers of apathy and short-term thinking. However, since many of his schemes involve waste management, which is a legitimate environmental issue, he often exploits this to gain apparent respectability. He is the only main villain to defect to the Planeteers after his recycling program makes him money by the end of "No Small Problem". The money allows him to propose plans to mass-produce an affordable, environmentally friendly way to dispose of waste.
  - Ooze (voiced by Cam Clarke) – Sludge's henchman who is often underpaid and works for him because he has no other option. Like Rigger, Ooze does most of his heavy work.
  - Tank Flusher III (voiced by Frank Welker) – Sludge's strongman servant who debuts in "A Mine Is a Terrible Thing to Waste Part One" upon answering an ad for "A heinous henchman to serve a Machiavellian master" despite not knowing what it means.
- Zarm (voiced by Sting in 1990–1992, David Warner in 1992, Malcolm McDowell in 1993–1995) – A former spirit of the Earth who left Gaia in search of other worlds and ended up destroying several planets, lacking Gaia to balance out his methods. He represents war and destruction. While lacking henchmen, he often manipulates others to do his bidding, such as in "Summit to Save Earth", where he unites the Eco-Villains under his leadership. In addition to war and destruction, Zarm also promotes hatred and totalitarianism, which he believes are the most dangerous pollutants to humanity, as evidenced by his role as kingmaker to the dictator Morgar. He also tells the Planeteers that he has been the guiding force behind every despot of the 20th century except for one despot who turned him down and dares the Planeteers to guess which one that would be. He mirrors Ares, the primordial Greek god of war.

==== Captain Pollution ====
Captain Pollution (voiced by David Coburn) is an evil counterpart to Captain Planet who appears in the two-part episode "Mission to Save Earth". Dr. Blight steals the Planeteers' rings and creates polluting duplicates of them with the opposite power of the Planeteers, which she gives to most of the Eco-Villains.

- Duke Nukem has a Super Radiation Ring (counterpart of Fire).
- Looten Plunder has a Deforestation Ring (counterpart of Earth).
- Sly Sludge has a Smog Ring (counterpart of Wind).
- Verminous Skumm has a Toxic Ring (counterpart of Water).
- Dr. Blight has a Hate Ring (counterpart of Heart).

Captain Pollution resembles Captain Planet, but has pale yellow skin covered with brown lesions and red hair and eyes, and wears a costume similar to his, except that the globe on his chest is torn in the middle. Captain Pollution is Captain Planet's polar opposite in personality, as he is arrogant and sees himself as a god and his creators as servants rather than partners, which Captain Planet says is his downfall. Captain Pollution is weakened by contact with pure elements, such as clean water or sunlight, and gains power from contact with pollutants, being able to absorb pollutants and emit radioactive rays. When he is summoned, he says "By your polluting powers combined, I am Captain Pollution!!", and when he disappears, he states "The polluting power is yours!"

In his first appearance, he is sent by the Eco-Villains to destroy the Planeteers, but is chased off by Commander Clash, and after a fight with Captain Planet, he returns to the evil rings, causing them to explode. In "A Mine is a Terrible Thing to Waste", he is brought back to life by the toxins of the five evil rings, which seep into the planet, but is defeated again and destroyed by Captain Planet.

==== Other villains ====
- The Slaughters – A family of poachers who debut in "The New Adventures of Captain Planet" and represent the endangerment of animals and the evils of poaching. While they are often in direct monetary competition with Looten Plunder, they work with him and Argos Bleak in "Horns A'Plenty".
  - Mame Slaughter (voiced by Theresa Saldana in the first appearance, Mitzi McCall in the second appearance) – The leader of the Slaughters.
  - Stalker Slaughter (voiced by Charlie Adler) – One of Mame's sons and her second-in-command.

=== Other characters ===
- Commander Clash (voiced by Louis Gossett Jr.) - A Cold War veteran who has aided the Planeteers in the two-part episode "Mission to Save Earth" and "Summit to Save Earth" Pt. 2
- Sky Runner (voiced by Robby Romero) - A Native American rock singer that the Planeteers know. In "Stardust", Sky Runner is tricked by Hoggish Greedly into funding his land-ravaging surface mining operation. In "Bitter Waters", Sky Runner calls the Planeteers when Looten Plunder and Argos Bleak plan to trick his people into selling their land for their urban development.
- Dr. Derek - A paraplegic scientist and friend of the Planeteers whose inventions are often targeted by Dr. Blight.

== Development ==
=== Conception ===
According to Barbara Pyle, the inspiration for the five Planeteers came from real people that she met during the show's pre-production in 1989. Gi was inspired by Malaysian environmental activist Chee Yoke Ling of Sahabat Alam Malaysia, while Ma-Ti was inspired by Paulinho Paiakan. She also stated that Wheeler was based on her father, and made him to be environmentally unaware based on the view she had of the attitudes displayed by the United States at the 1992 Rio Earth Summit. Kwame was inspired by the survivors of the Rhodesian Bush War. In a September 2012 interview with Barbara Pyle and co-developer Nicholas Boxer, it was stated that Hope Island was located near the Bahamas.

=== DIC history (1990–1992) ===
The original series, produced by TBS Productions and DiC, was the second longest running US-cartoon of the 1990s, with three seasons and 65 episodes under the name Captain Planet and the Planeteers.

The show's theme song was composed by Tom Worrall, with lyrics written by show producer Nick Boxer, and performed by Murray McFadden and Timothy Mulhollan.

=== Hanna-Barbera history (1993–1996) ===
In 1993, the show switched production companies to Hanna-Barbera Cartoons, which had been acquired by Turner in 1991. The title changed to The New Adventures of Captain Planet. During this time, it aired as part of TBS' Sunday Morning in Front of the TV block, alongside other H-B series SWAT Kats: The Radical Squadron and 2 Stupid Dogs. The revamped series revealed more of the past of each of the characters and expanded on them dramatically. The tone of these episodes was more mature than the initial series. The animation style was of considerably higher quality than the DiC seasons.

The DiC seasons' synth-rock soundtrack was replaced by a large number of orchestral pieces, and while the end credits theme was retained, the ending sequence now showcased footage from the Hanna-Barbera episodes. Full-time voice actors replaced most of the major celebrities that had voiced Gaia and the Eco-Villains during the DiC seasons. The opening narration was spoken by David Coburn (Captain Planet) rather than LeVar Burton (Kwame) and, in the final season, was replaced by a rap by Fred Schneider of The B-52's.

=== Legacy ===
The Captain Planet Foundation (CPF) was founded in 1991, when series producer Barbara Pyle negotiated a percentage of the show's merchandising revenue to empower young people. The concept allowed schools and organizations around the world to present their environmental projects to the Foundation and receive seed money to grow their ideas. In 2001, Time Warner decided to shut down the CPF due to a challenging merger with AOL. Laura Seydel and her husband Rutherford Seydel worked with Time Warner to orchestrate the transition of the corporate foundation to a public charity – the Captain Planet Foundation. In 2007, CPF acquired the rights to exhibit previous episodes of Captain Planet and the Planeteers online and on-air, thus "allowing this valuable resource to reach out and educate the children of today!" As of 2017, the organization's board is chaired by Laura Turner Seydel, daughter of Ted Turner; the board includes Barbara Pyle.

== Reception ==
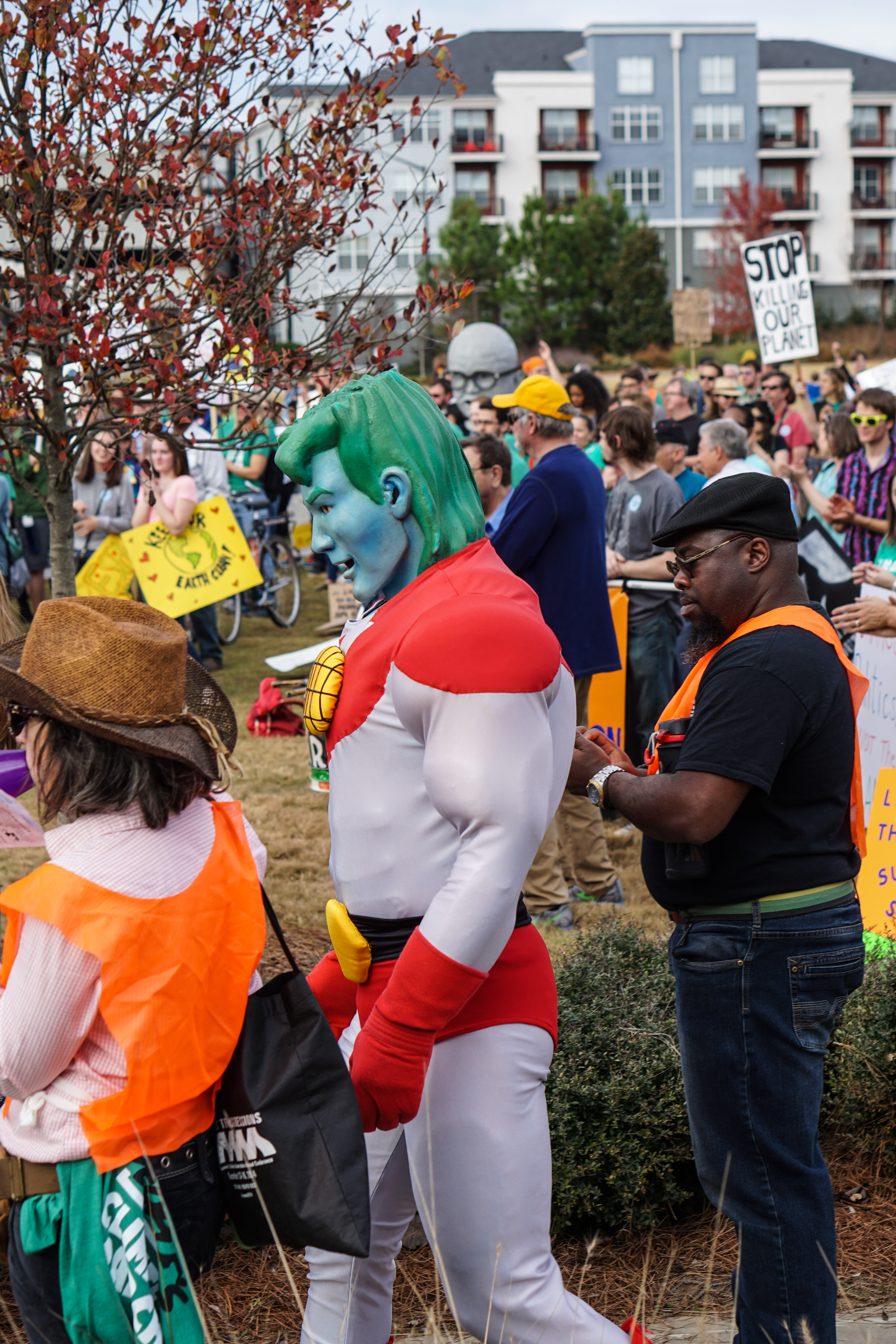
At the Atlanta Peoples' Climate March.

In 1990, The Los Angeles Times described the show as having "not much originality", although also saying that "there's a passion behind this series, which adapts a conventional super-hero formula to an unconventional theme", also stating that the celebrities voicing the series "also sets the series apart". The newspaper also described the show as being part of "the increased awareness of Earth as endangered". L. Brent Bozell III, a conservative activist, accused the show of "seeking to scare children into political activism", along with accusing the show of having "leftist slants"; Barbara Pyle responded, saying "I don't think 'Captain Planet' is scary ... it shows kids that every action counts ... I consider [environmental issues] bipartisan."

Diane Holloway from Austin American-Statesman wrote, "The animation is crude and jerky, but the messages are important and clear enough for a 4-year old to understand", while Rebecca Coudret from Evansville Courier & Press said she "wondered if [children] were simply responding to the basic good vs. evil clash." In 1993, the episode "Dream Machine" won an award at the Environmental Media Awards, and in 1994, the episode "Gorillas Will Be Missed" likewise did. Reviewing season one in 2012, IGN gave the show a rating of 5 out of 10, describing the animation as "pretty weak" and the stories as "too hokey".

== Educational goals ==
Various episodes were constructed to touch on relevant themes to a younger audience:

- "Mind Pollution"

The episode titled "Mind Pollution" (1991) was notable for dealing with the issue of drug abuse. This was explained by the fact that the characters thought of drug addiction as "pollution of the mind". The episode revolved around an epidemic of a designer drug known as "Bliss" created by Verminous Skumm. It included a scene of Linka's cousin Boris jumping through a window and dying from a drug overdose.

- "Population Bomb"

"Population Bomb" (1991) continued the trend of tackling controversial subject matter atypical for a children's cartoon, in this instance overpopulation, a Malthusian concern. Using mice as substitutes for humans, the episode sets Wheeler on a Gulliver's Travels style adventure where he encounters a tribe of sentient mice who are destroyed by overpopulation and irresponsible leadership. It turns out that the ordeal is something that Wheeler dreamed up, though it serves as a warning for the audience about sustainability and over-consumption.

- "A Formula for Hate"

The episode titled "A Formula for Hate" (1992) was also unusual for the series in that it was the first episode in an American children's animated series to directly deal with the HIV/AIDS pandemic. In the episode, Skumm and one of his rat henchmen brainwashes a local community into thinking the virus can be spread through casual contact and thus causing people to hate and fear a young man, infected with HIV, named Todd Andrews (voiced by Neil Patrick Harris, with his mother voiced by Elizabeth Taylor). Captain Planet tells the truth about AIDS to the entire basketball team with help from Todd's coach. Then Captain Planet catches Skumm and his rat henchman and hands them over to the police.

== Franchise extension ==
Pyle and Boxer requested that the series' merchandise be made sustainably, and hence the companies producing Captain Planet-themed merchandise completely overhauled their means of production to manufacture recycled and recyclable products.

=== Toys ===
Captain Planet had a line of toys released by Tiger in 1990, which lasted long enough to tie into the New Adventures series. The toys were packaged and sold by Grand Toys in Canada and Kenner throughout Europe. The action figures could be posed at the common five points – neck, shoulders, and hips.

The action figures consisted of the Planeteers, the Eco-Villains, Commander Clash, and several versions of Captain Planet, each with a different gimmick or paint scheme. A toy ring with lights, sound and interchangeable lenses for the five elements was also released, as were several vehicles.

Four additional toy vehicles were also sold through a Burger King promotion.

=== Video games ===
A video game based on the series was developed for the Nintendo Entertainment System by Mindscape titled Captain Planet, and it received negative reviews from game critics which led to a Sega Mega Drive (Genesis) version of the game being cancelled. A side-scrolling game was developed by Novalogic for the Mega Drive/Genesis, and released exclusively in Europe and Australia.

David Perry and Nick Bruty developed a ZX Spectrum and Amstrad CPC game based on the show, a 3-level shoot 'em up. Another game, a platformer, was released in 1990 for the Amiga and Atari ST, written by Tony Crowther; this game was briefly bundled with the Amiga 500 "Cartoon Classics" pack released in 1991. A Commodore 64 game was planned but never released. Tiger Toys, owners of the action figure license, also created an LCD hand-held game.

Captain Planet appears as a playable character in the fighting game Cartoon Network: Punch Time Explosion for Nintendo 3DS, Wii, PS3, and Xbox 360.

=== Home media ===
Turner Home Entertainment originally released VHS tapes of the series, which contained a single episode on each. DIC's main home video distributor Buena Vista Home Video would also release single-episode VHS releases as well.

A DVD with four episodes and bonus features exists but was only available as part of a "Planeteer Pack" purchased from the Captain Planet Foundation. This promotional DVD contained the episodes "A River Ran Through It", "A Perfect World", "Gorillas Will Be Missed", and "The Big Clam Up". A short clip titled "Planeteers in Action", which is about the Captain Planet Foundation, is also included. The "Planeteer Pack" special is no longer available.

Shout! Factory under license from Turner and Warner Home Video released a DVD set of the complete first season in the U.S. on April 19, 2011. The DVD packaging is made of 100% recycled paper.

Madman Entertainment released the first season on July 6, 2016 and the complete collection on October 25, 2017 in Australia.

As of March 25, 2017, it is available on iTunes for purchase. The whole series was made available on Amazon Instant Video.

On October 15, 2024, Warner Bros. Discovery Home Entertainment (through Studio Distribution Services) released the complete series on a DVD box set, featuring all 113 episodes from both the DIC and Hanna-Barbera seasons. Not only does this reissue the first season, but this marks the first time that the remaining five seasons have been released to DVD in the United States.

The series was also released on Blu-ray on April 22, 2025.

=== Film ===
Multiple attempts have been made to create a film adaptation of the series. The first occurred in 1996 when Boxer and Pyle wrote a film adaptation of Captain Planet originally titled Planet. Five years later, Michael Reaves revised the concept as Dark Planet or Planet. The storyline was darker than the series, and set in a post-apocalyptic time period. However, the script was lost when Turner and Warner Bros. merged in 1996. The film reached the design stage before it was abandoned.

Other attempts at a film version were made in 2007, 2011, and 2013, but none of these versions came to pass. In October 2016, Paramount Pictures and Leonardo DiCaprio's Appian Way were attempting to develop a new movie and were in negotiation with Jono Matt and Glen Powell to write the script, with Powell to star as the titular character. The status of the project remained unclear for years with no further updates. In early 2023, Powell claimed that hurdles at Warner Bros. Discovery would need to be cleared before moving forward.

Deadline revealed on July 17, 2025 that the project had become a live-action television series, which had entered development at Netflix. The series is being written by Tara Hernandez, co-creator of Mrs. Davis, and produced by Berlanti Productions, Appian Way and Warner Bros. Television.

=== Comic books ===
Marvel Comics published a comic series titled Captain Planet and the Planeteers. The series ran twelve issues, cover dated October 1991 through October 1992.

A new comic series by Dynamite Entertainment began release on May 7, 2025, and ran for six issues. It was planned to be released on Earth Day (April 23) but, was delayed. Captain Planet and the Planeteers is written by David Pepose and illustrated by Emmanuel Casallos. The series received mostly positive reviews, averaging a critic score of 8.4/10 according to Comic Book Round Up.

=== OK K.O.! crossover ===
In 2017, Captain Planet appeared in a special crossover episode of the Cartoon Network series OK K.O.! Let's Be Heroes, with David Coburn reprising his role as Captain Planet and LeVar Burton reprising his role as Kwame. The heroes battled Dr. Blight (accompanied by a silent MAL). The episode "The Power Is Yours" aired on October 9, 2017, as part of the first season.
