= David Coburn (actor) =

American actor

- Occupation: Actor
- Years active: 1979–present
- Children: 2

David Coburn is an American actor. He is best known as the voice of Captain Planet in the TV series Captain Planet and the Planeteers and his work as Walter Potter in Harry and the Hendersons.

== Career ==
Coburn made his acting debut at the age of ten as Ted Loomis in the television series One Day at a Time (1979–1981). He later voiced Captain Planet in Captain Planet and the Planeteers, replacing original candidate Tom Cruise, and reprised the role in a crossover episode of OK K.O.! Let's Be Heroes. Coburn was also known for portraying Walter Potter in Harry and the Hendersons.

== Personal life ==
Coburn has lived in Paris, France, since 2011 while continuing to do environmental work. He has twin daughters.

== Filmography ==
=== Television ===
Year	Title	Role	Notes
1979–1981	One Day at a Time	Ted Loomis	2 episodes
1980	The Facts of Life	Carl	Episode: "Who Am I?"
1980	Diff'rent Strokes	Jimmy	2 episodes
1984	Pole Position	Dan Darret (voice)	13 episodes
1989	21 Jump Street	Dave Gordon	Episode: "High High"
1989–1990	Growing Pains	Doug	2 episodes
1990	New Kids on the Block	Donnie Wahlberg, Nikko (voice)	13 episodes
1990–1996	Captain Planet and the Planeteers	Captain Planet, Captain Pollution (voice)	Main cast
1991	Star Trek: The Next Generation	Brower	Episode: "The Nth Degree"
1991–1993	Harry and the Hendersons	Walter Potter	26 episodes
1992	Defenders of Dynatron City	Toolbox (voice)	Television pilot
1994, 1999	Sister, Sister	Claude	2 episodes
1995, 1999	Where on Earth Is Carmen Sandiego?	Lee Jordan (voice)	4 episodes
1995	Space Strikers	Captain Nemo (voice)	13 episodes
1998	Oh Yeah! Cartoons	Galen (voice)	Episode: "Enchanted Adventures"
1999	Can of Worms	Jarm (voice)	Television film
1999	Babylon 5: A Call to Arms	Minbari Ranger	Television film
1999	Screenplay	Bobby	Television film
2006	Law & Order: Special Victims Unit	Eddie Loomis	Episode: "Fault"
2006	The Sopranos	Bartender	Episode: "Mr. & Mrs. John Sacrimoni Request..."
2011–2013	Platane	Himself	7 episodes
2015–2020	Zip Zip	Washington, Mitch (voice)	English dub; 52 episodes
2017	OK K.O.! Let's Be Heroes	Captain Planet (voice)	Episode: "The Power Is Yours!"
2022	FBI: International	Olivier	Episode: "Uprooting"
2022	Emily in Paris	Tim Davies	Episode: "Ex-En-Provence"

=== Film ===
Year	Title	Role	Notes
1980	The Jazz Singer	Bar Mitzvah Boy	
1986	Born American	K.C.	
1989	The Fabulous Baker Boys	Kid at Vet	
2002	Pinocchio	Carabineres, Undertaker Rabbit, Warder	English dub
2002	Asterix & Obelix: Mission Cleopatra	Asterix	English dub
2012	Picasso's Gang	Leo Stein	
2019	Alice	Lawyer	
2019	My Life in Versailles	Mr. Angel (voice)	Short film; English dub
2019	Anna	CIA Chief	

=== Video games ===
Year	Title	Role	Notes
2001	Zoog Genius: Math, Science & Technology	MZ, Browser	
2003	Manhunt	Innocent	
2004	Def Jam: Fight for NY	Cruz	
2004	Grand Theft Auto: San Andreas	Pedestrian	
2006	Neverwinter Nights 2	Baalbisan, Annaeus Spirit, Darmon	
2013	Beyond: Two Souls	Stan	
2013	Mars: War Logs	Roy	
2014	Blue Estate: The Game	Mauro, Gangsters	
2016	Furi	The Scale	
2017	Styx: Shards of Darkness	Dwarf	
2018	Detroit: Become Human	Richard Perkins	
2019	Blacksad: Under the Skin	John Smirnov	
2019	Alt-Frequencies	Ennis B	
2021	Alfred Hitchcock – Vertigo	Nick Reyes	
2022	Mario + Rabbids Sparks of Hope	Augie, Woodrow, NPC Rabbids, Enemies & Bosses Rabbids	
2023	Tintin Reporter – Cigars of the Pharaoh	Randolpho Bertolino, Red Sea Captain, Abudin Air Force Captain, Dr. Finney	
2026	Garfield: Escape from Monday	Garfield, Chef Monday	
