= Jim Duffy (animator) =

American animator (1937–2012)

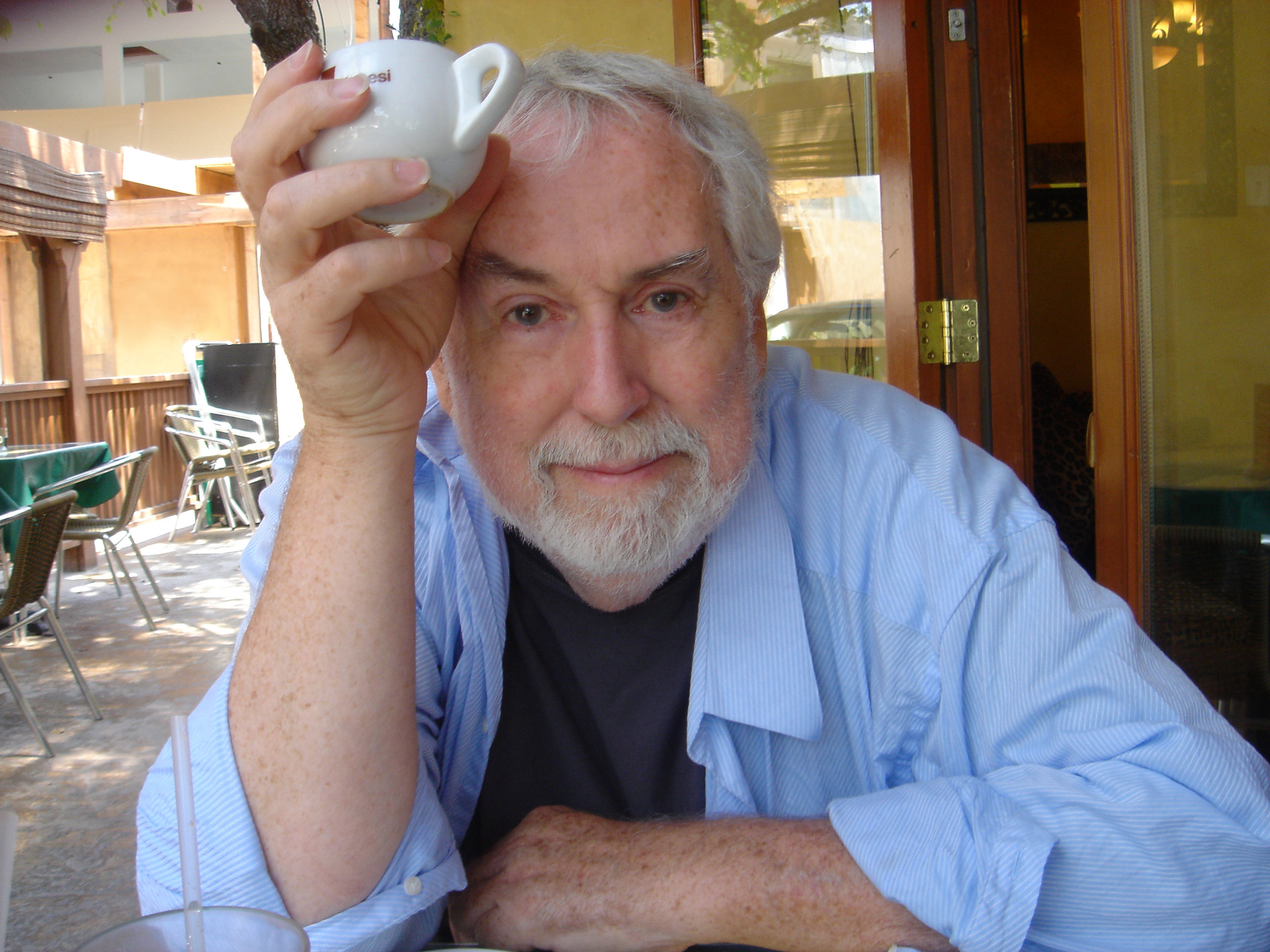
- Duffy in 2006
- Born: July 2, 1937
- Died: March 23, 2012 (aged 74)
- Occupation: Animator
- Years active: 1960–2012
- Children: Barbara Ann Duffy, Vera Duffy, James Duffy
- Website: ALotOfDuffysFilms.com

Jim Duffy (July 2, 1937 – March 23, 2012) was an American animator whose credits included more than twenty years at Klasky Csupo creating productions for Nickelodeon, as well as earlier stints as an animator for Hanna-Barbera, TVC Animation in London, Murakami-Wolf-Swenson, and others. Duffy received two Primetime Emmy Awards for the 2000s animated show As Told by Ginger, as well as several other nominations for his work on Rugrats. Duffy also won three Daytime Emmy Awards during his tenure at Klasky Csupo, and received additional nominations for his work on Aaahh!!! Real Monsters and Captain Planet and the Planeteers. Duffy was also a director, writer, designer and storyboard artist for live-action television commercials, PSAs, and corporate productions, including a series of safety videos for the National Coal Board. He divided his professional time between Los Angeles and London. His shortform animated films were screened at film festivals worldwide.

Duffy was born in the United States and raised in the United Kingdom. He first worked as an animator at Hanna-Barbera during the 1970s. His credits with Hanna-Barbera during the 1970s and early 1980s included Super Friends, The Smurfs, and The New Scooby and Scrappy-Doo Show. After leaving Hanna-Barbera, Duffy spent much of the 1980s working on productions for other animation studios, including The Real Ghostbusters for DIC Entertainment, G.I. Joe: A Real American Hero for Sunbow Productions, and Teenage Mutant Ninja Turtles for Murakami Wolf Swenson.

Duffy joined Klasky Csupo, where he supervised many of the studios productions which aired on Nickelodeon for more than twenty years. In addition to the shows which earned him Emmy nominations and awards, such as Rugrats, his credits included Duckman, Rocket Power, and All Grown Up!, which aired from 2003 to 2008.

Duffy died from cancer on March 23, 2012, at the age of 74. He was survived by his children, Barbara Duffy, Vera Duffy, and James Duffy, and his former wife, Cella Nichols Duffy, an animation producer. His funeral was held at the Old North Church in the Forest Lawn Memorial Park in the Hollywood Hills.

== Filmography ==
W-riter, A-nimator, S-toryboard, T-imer, SS-Storyboard Slugging, AA-Assistant Animator, AD-Assistant Director, AS-Animation Supervisor, D-irector, P-roducer, SP-Supervising Producer, C-reative Producer

- 2011 - "H! I.J.F.I.T.T" (W/S/A/D/P)
- 2008 - "Immigrants" (D)
- 2006 - "The Adventures of Chico and Guapo" (D)
- 2005 - "Take A Break:30" (W/S/A/D/P)
- 2003 - "All Grown Up!" (P)
- 2001 - "As Told By Ginger" (SP)
- 1999 - "Rocket Power" (P/SP/CP); "The Wacky Adventures of Ronald McDonald" (D)
- 1997 - "Rugrats" (P/SP/CP)
- 1996 - "Teenage Mutant Ninja Turtles" (T)
- 1995 - "Dino Babies" (T)
- 1994 - "Aaahh!!! Real Monsters" (D); "Duckman" (T)
- 1991 - "Captain Planet and the Planeteers" (P)
- 1990 - "The Adventures of Super Mario Bros. 3" (S)
- 1987 - "Visionaries: Knights of Magical Light" (P); "Dirk Niblick" (A)
- 1986 - "Jem" (SP); "My Little Pony" (P); "Solarman" (P); "The Real Ghosbusters" (SS)
- 1985 - "G.I.Joe" (P); "Solarman" (P); "Super Sunday - Jem" (P)
- 1984 - "G.I.Joe - The Revenge of Cobra!" (P)
- 1983 - "The Smurfs" (A); "What Have We Learned Charlie Brown?" (A); "The New Scooby and Scrappy-Doo Show" (T); "The Great Bear Scare" (A)
- 1982 - "Puff and the Incredible Mr. Nobody" (A); "Peter and the Magic Egg" (A); "My Smurfy Valentine" (A)
- 1981 - "Fonz and the Happy Days Gang" (AS); "Super Friends" (AS)
- 1980 - "Carousel" (A)
- 1979 - "Little Rascals" (S/D)
- 1978 - "The Devil May Care" (W/S/A/D); "The Lion, Witch, and Wardrobe" (A/AD)
- 1977 - "Teamwork" (W/S/D); "Challenge of the Sexes" (W/S/A/D)
- 1976 - "The Extraordinary Adventures of The Mouse and His Child" (A)
- 1975 - "Supergoop" (A)
- 1974 - "Five Problems in Communication" (W/S/A/D)
- 1973 - "Dandruff" (W/S/A/D/P); "Making Music Together" (S); "Safety Senses" (W/S/A/D)
- 1972 - "How Not To Lose Your Head While Shotfiring!" (W/S/A/D)
- 1971 - "Self-Rescue Breathing Apparatus" (W/S); "Horses of Death" (W/S/A/D)
- 1970 - "Toby" (W/S/A/D/P)
- 1969 - "Digging" (W/S/A/D/P); "The Weightlifter" (W/S/A/D/P)
- 1968 - "My Turtle Died Today" (S/A/D); "Sense of Responsibility" (W/S); "The Magic Pear Tree" (AA)
- 1967 - "Homework and Study Habits" (S/A/D)
- 1966 - "Discovery Radar" (S/A); "Hands, Knees, and Bumps-A-Daisy" (W/S)
- 1965 - "Safety Boots," "The Roof," "Your Helmet" (W/S/A/D)
