= Zip Zip =

French animated television series

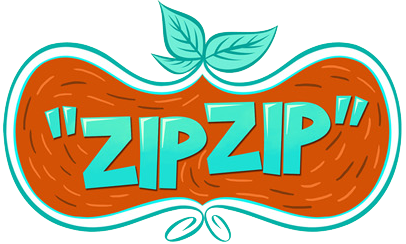
- Genre: Comedy; Slapstick; Adventure
- Created by: Aurore Damant
- Based on: An original idea by Anne Ozannat
- Directed by: Aurore Damant (episode 1); Lionel Allaix
- Voices of: French: Gauthier Battoue; Benoît DuPac; Camille Donda; Charlyne Pestel; Diane Dassigny; Natacha Muller; Bruno Magne; English: David Coburn; Matthew Géczy; Sharon Mann; Tiffanny Hoffstetter
- Composer: Séverin
- Country of origin: France
- Original languages: French; English
- No. of seasons: 2
- No. of episodes: 104

Production
- Executive producer: Eric Garnet
- Producers: Eric Garnet; Anne de Galard
- Editors: Fiona Couturier; Antoine Delaporte
- Running time: 11 minutes
- Production company: GO-N Productions

Original release
- Network: France 3 France 4 (season 2)
- Release: March 23, 2015 – 2020

Zip Zip is a French animated television series created by Aurore Damant, based on an original idea by Anne Ozannat, and directed by Lionel Allaix. The series is produced by GO-N Productions with the participation of France Télévisions, Super RTL and The Walt Disney Company France in association with A Plus Image 3 and France 3. The series premiered on Super RTL in Germany on March 23, 2015 and on France 3 in France on April 4. It was renewed for a second season which premiered on July 8, 2019, with the English dub premiering on YouTube on August 6, 2021.

== Premise ==
Tired of living in the forest, Washington the red fox, Sam the boar, his sister Eugenie, and Suzie the blackbird decide to leave the wilderness and go to the city. To avoid being seen by people as wild animals and getting caught by animal control, the four take domestic animal costumes to disguise themselves as a dog (Washington), a cat (Sam), a rabbit (Eugenie) and a canary (Suzie) and pose as common house pets incognito. The Livingstones soon adopt them, and now they live in the Livingstones' house with their cat, Victoria.

Throughout the episodes, they must keep their secret at all costs. They also get rid of numerous enemies who sometimes intimidate them and seize the Livingstone family home where they have settled.

== Characters ==
=== Main ===
- Washington (voiced by Gauthier Battoue in French and David Coburn in English) - a red fox who's disguised as a brown dog.
- Sam (voiced by Benoît DuPac in French and Matthew Géczy in English) - a wild boar who's disguised as a blue cat.
- Eugenie (voiced by Camille Donda in French and Sharon Mann in English) - a young wild boar who's disguised as a pink rabbit.
- Suzie (voiced by Charlyne Pestel in French and Tiffany Hofstetter in English) - a blackbird who's disguised as a yellow canary.
- Victoria (voiced by Diane Dassigny in French and Tiffany Hofstetter in English) - a disdainful, icy and odious grey cat.

=== Recurring ===
- The Livingstones (voiced by Natacha Muller and Nessym Guetat in French and Sharon Mann and Matthew Géczy in English) - two human adults.
- Nugget (Nougat) (voiced by Annabelle Roux in French and Tiffany Hofstetter in English) - a pink cat.
- Fluffy (Framboise) (voiced by Leslie Lipkins in French and Sharon Mann in English) - a blue cat.
- Vincent (voiced by Matthew Géczy in English) - a red/brown hamster.

=== Antagonists ===
- Alvarez (voiced by Matthew Géczy in English) - an orange afghan hound.
- Plato (voiced by Matthew Géczy in English) - a black Scottish Terrier.
- Gracie and Alphie Apleeton (voiced by TBA) - two human children.
- Mitch (voiced by Bruno Magne in French and David Coburn in English) - a brown bear.
- Fang (voiced by TBA) - A blue neighborhood cat who's romantically driven to win the affection of Victoria.
- Vladimir (voiced by Bruno Magne in French and Matthew Géczy in English) - a male vet.

=== Minor ===
- Meadow (voiced by TBA) - a red vixen who is Washington's love interest.

== Voice cast ==
Character	French	English
Washington	Gauthier Battoue	David Coburn
Sam	Benoît DuPac	Matthew Géczy
Eugenie	Camille Donda	Sharon Mann
Suzie	Charlyne Pestel	Tiffany Hofstetter
Victoria	Diane Dassigny	Tiffany Hofstetter
Mrs. Livingstone	Natacha Muller	Sharon Mann
Mr. Livingstone	Nessym Guetat	Matthew Géczy
Nugget (Nougat)	Annabelle Roux	Tiffany Hofstetter
Fluffy (Framboise)	Leslie Lipkins	Sharon Mann
Mitch	Bruno Magne	David Coburn
Vladimir	Bruno Magne	Matthew Géczy
Alvarez		
Fang		
Gracie Apleeton		
Alphie Apleeton		
Meadow		

== Episodes ==
=== Season 1 (2015) ===
No.	Title	Written by	Storyboarded by	Original release date
1	"Bye Bye Bathtime"	Ian Carney	Lionel Allaix	March 23, 2015 (Germany); May 9, 2015 (France)
Wash needs to take a bath.
2	"A Tail to Tell"	Cynthia True	Lionel Allaix	March 23, 2015 (Germany)
The wild ones need to look for a tail.
3	"Washington Gone Wild"	Cynthia True	Anthony Pascal	March 24, 2015 (Germany); April 4, 2015 (France)
When Wash stumbles in the house without his costume, it's tough luck for the pets.
4	"Undercover Bother"	Brendan Hay	Thierry Sapyn	March 25, 2015 (Germany)
A noisy bunch of raccoons make Wash a member of their crew.
5	"The Unsuitables"	Thomas Barichella	Christophe Pittet	March 25, 2015 (Germany); May 23, 2015 (France)
One of the pets get fat and accidentally stumbles without his costume in a house.
6	"No Good Dig Goes Unpunished"	Cynthia True	Anthony Pascal	March 26, 2015 (Germany)
Wash goes crazy and digs himself a hole.
7	"A.I."	Pierre-Gilles Stehr	Gark	March 26, 2015 (Germany)
The pets find a vacuum that later gets them into trouble after sucking up their costumes.
8	"Party Animals"	Cynthia True	Thierry Sapyn	April 20, 2015 (Germany); May 2, 2015 (France)
The pets are invited to Fluffy and Nugget's double-birthday party. Things go wrong though.
9	"The Dot That Cannot Be Caught"	Erik Wiese	Thierry Sapyn	March 30, 2015 (Germany)
The cats have a terrible time chasing a laser (that can't be caught).
10	"Rained In"	Jessica Gao	Baptiste Lucas	March 24, 2015 (Germany)
Wash needs to go to the toilet badly.
11	"Sweet and Sour Sam"	Ian Carney	Nicolas Moschini	March 30, 2015 (Germany); May 23, 2015 (France)
When one of the pets gets sprayed by a skunk, he has to smell sweet again.
12	"Master Bedroom"	Darren Belitsky	Christophe Pittet	March 27, 2015 (Germany); May 30, 2015 (France)
The pets have to get washed after a flea attack in the bedroom. Along with that, some mucky mishaps happen at night.
13	"GoofTube"	Pierre-Gilles Stehr	Nima Azarba	March 27, 2015 (Germany)
The pets upload funny videos.
14	"Sick as a (Fox Dressed Like a) Dog"	Alec Holland	Nima Azarba	March 31, 2015 (Germany); June 6, 2015 (France)
The pet cat gets the flu. It's not all fun and games when the vet comes!
15	"Meet Mitch"	Erik Wiese	Christophe Pittet	April 2, 2015 (Germany); July 8, 2015 (France)
Two of the pets abandon their costumes to meet a bear.
16	"Welcome to the Doghouse"	Darren Belitsky and Erik Wiese	Thierry Sapyn	April 2, 2015 (Germany); April 11, 2015 (France)
Wash gets built his very own doghouse.
17	"Toilet Break"	Guillaume Mautalent and Sébastien Oursel	Fred Mintoff	April 7, 2015 (Germany)
One of the pets get sent down the toilet.
18	"Night of the WereFox"	Erik Wiese	Phillipe Leconte	April 1, 2015 (Germany); July 9, 2015 (France)
Wash is turned into a were-fox after staring at the red blood moon.
19	"Guitar Hero"	Thomas Barichella and Pierre-Gilles Stehr	Brice Magnier	March 31, 2015 (Germany)
One of the pets learn to play the guitar. A stray cat teaches the pet how to play it.
20	"Tail That Wags"	Daryle Conners and Marya Sea Kaminski	Philippe Leconte	April 7, 2015 (Germany)
Wash's tail can't wag.
21	"Midnight Growler"	Nicolas Verpilleux	Nima Azarba	April 8, 2015 (Germany)
A pet acts like a boar after watching a documentary.
22	"Truffle Trouble"	Pierre-Gilles Stehr	Julien Thompson	April 8, 2015 (Germany); July 13, 2015 (France)
A pet has their plucky eyes on the truffles.
23	"(Un)Natural Enemies"	Kristine Songco and Joanna Lewis	Thierry Sapyn	April 9, 2015 (Germany)
24	"The Wild Side"	Erik Wiese	Christophe Pittet	April 9, 2015 (Germany)
25	"Dare to Be Wild"	Erik Wiese	Dominique Etchecopar	April 10, 2015 (Germany)
26	"Going Postal"	Antoine Guilbaud	Fred Mintoff	April 10, 2015 (Germany)
27	"August Fur-Low"	Daryle Conners and Marya Sea Kaminski	Philippe Leconte	April 13, 2015 (Germany)
28	"Boar to Be Wild"	Kristine Songco and Joanna Lewis	Olivier Derynck	April 13, 2015 (Germany)
29	"Gracie & Alphie Come to Play"	Ian Carney	Nicolas Moschini	April 1, 2015 (Germany); April 15, 2015 (France)
30	"Show Dog"	Nicolas Verpilleux	Thierry Sapyn	April 14, 2015 (Germany); April 16, 2015 (France)
31	"Fetch!"	Erik Wiese	Nima Azarba	April 14, 2015 (Germany); April 17, 2015 (France)
32	"Watchdog Wash"	Emmanuel de Franceschi	Julien Thompson	April 15, 2015 (Germany); April 18, 2015 (France)
33	"A Short Term Leash"	Matthieu Chevallier	Christophe Pittet	April 15, 2015 (Germany)
34	"Welcome to the Jungle"	Matthieu Chevallier	Philippe Leconte	April 16, 2015 (Germany); April 22, 2015 (France)
35	"Animal Carnival"	Pierre-Gilles Stehr	Thierry Sapyn	April 17, 2015 (Germany); April 23, 2015 (France)
36	"Foxy Lady"	Matthew Beans	Ronan Le Brun	April 17, 2015 (Germany); April 24, 2015 (France)
37	"A Hole in One...Too Many"	Alec Holland	Olivier Derynck	April 16, 2015 (Germany); May 6, 2015 (France)
38	"Hero Dog"	Laura Beck	Fred Mintoff	April 28, 2015 (Germany); May 7, 2015 (France)
39	"Dog Years"	Laura Beck and Melanie Lewis	Nima Azarba	April 28, 2015 (Germany)
40	"Un-Bear-able"	Pierre-Gilles Stehr	Julien Thompson	April 22, 2015 (Germany)
41	"Neighborhood Challenge"	Erik Wiese	Philippe Leconte	April 29, 2015 (Germany)
42	"Neighborhood Challenge"	Erik Wiese	Thierry Sapyn	April 29, 2015 (Germany)
43	"Just Like New"	Antoine Guilbaud	Christophe Pittet	April 23, 2015 (Germany)
44	"The Wildest Dream"	Erik Wiese	Nima Azarba	April 24, 2015 (Germany)
45	"Pride Cometh Before the Fowl"	Matthew Beans	Nicolas Moschini	April 20, 2015 (Germany)
46	"Mr. L's Big Trip"	Matthieu Chevallier	Fred Mintoff	April 23, 2015 (Germany)
47	"Masked Fox"	Nicolas Verpilleux	Philippe Leconte	April 27, 2015 (Germany)
48	"Our Little Secret"	Emmanuel de Franceschi	Julien Thompson	April 28, 2015 (Germany)
49	"Dogs Have More Fun"	Erik Wiese	Thierry Sapyn	April 21, 2015 (Germany)
50	"When Pigs Fly"	Pierre-Gilles Stehr	Philippe Leconte	April 11, 2015 (France); April 21, 2015 (Germany)
51	"Blanket Nightmare"	Erik Wiese	Olivier Derynck	April 22, 2015 (Germany)
52	"The Sam Trap"	Matthieu Chevallier	Ronan Le Brun	April 24, 2015 (Germany)

=== Season 2 (2019–20) ===
No. overall	No. in season	Title	Written by	Storyboarded by	Original release date
53	1	"Sam-nesiac"	Nicolas Verpilleux	Lionel Allaix	July 8, 2019
TBA.
54	2	"No Deals with Mice"	Balthazar Chapuis	Julien Thompson	TBA
TBA.
55	3	"Crazy About the Toy"	Nicolas Verpilleux	Yannick Zanchetta	TBA
TBA.
56	4	"Master Poppy"	Nicolas Verpilleux	Sylvain Girault	TBA
TBA.
57	5	"The Flies"	Yves Coulon	Alexandre Hesse	TBA
58	6	"Pet Spies"	Laure-Elisabeth Bourdaud and Johanna Goldschmidt	Stéphane Beau	TBA
59	7	"The Golden Ball"	Balthazar Chapuis	Julien Thompson	TBA
60	8	"Out Foxing Alvarez"	Gauthier Battoue	Maxime Mauboussin	TBA
61	9	"Allergy Alert"	Yves Coulon	Camilo Collao	TBA
62	10	"Desperately Seeking Sam"	Balthazar Chapuis	Yannick Zanchetta	TBA
63	11	"Very Attractive Costume"	Laure-Elisabeth Bourdaud and Johanna Goldschmidt	Sylvain Girault	TBA
64	12	"Hair ID"	Matthieu Chevallier	Stéphane Beau	TBA
65	13	"The Treasure Hunt"	Yves Coulon	Alexandre Hesse	TBA
66	14	"Cousin Alvarez"	Yannick Hervieu	Frédérick Chaillou	TBA
67	15	"Wash at the Double"	Yannick Hervieu and Cécile Leclère	Julien Thompson	TBA
68	16	"Back to Nature"	Nicolas Verpilleux	Ryan Chang Lam	TBA
69	17	"Which Way? That Way?"	Balthazar Chapuis	Mohamed Labidi	TBA
70	18	"Magic Sam"	Christophe Courty	Sylvain Girault	TBA
71	19	"The Super Smart Wizards"	Simon Lecocq	Stéphane Beau	TBA
72	20	"Good Old Magnus"	Yannick Hervieu and Cécile Leclère	Stéphane Beau	TBA
73	21	"In Quarantine"	Simon Lecocq	Ryan Chang Lam	TBA
74	22	"The Queens of Disguise"	Balthazar Chapuis	Julien Thompson	TBA
75	23	"Eugenie Goes Electric"	Yves Coulon	Sylvain Girault	TBA
76	24	"A Quick Trip to the Forest"	Christophe Courty	Stéphane Beau	TBA
77	25	"And Don't Forget to Tip"	Laure-Elisabeth Bourdaud and Johanna Goldschmidt	Mohamed Labidi	TBA
78	26	"Tattooed"	Simon Lecocq	Olivier Dutranoy	TBA
79	27	"The Flying Dog"	Christophe Courty	Alexandre Hesse	TBA
80	28	"You're a Good Son, Wash"	Yves Coulon	Alexandre Hesse	TBA
81	29	"Born to Be Flea"	Pierre-Gilles Stehr and Xavier Vairé	Ahmed Nasri	TBA
82	30	"Kittymunch"	Christophe Courty	Julien Thompson	TBA
83	31	"Exterminatrix"	Balthazar Chapuis	Sylvain Girault	TBA
84	32	"Swallowed Whole"	Laure-Elisabeth Bourdaud and Johanna Goldschmidt	Olivier Dutranoy	TBA
85	33	"I Love You Sow Much!"	Yves Coulon	Sylvain Girault	TBA
86	34	"Super Vision"	Nicolas Verpilleux	Colin Albert and Arthur Moncla	TBA
87	35	"All Aboard!"	Christophe Courty	Julien Thompson	TBA
88	36	"The Art of the Deal"	Laure-Elisabeth Bourdaud and Johanna Goldschmidt	Ryan Chang Lam	TBA
89	37	"Vet at the House"	Yves Coulon	Alexandre Hesse	TBA
90	38	"The Magic Flute"	Simon Lecocq	Ryan Chang Lam	TBA
91	39	"The Curse of Victoria"	Nathalie Dargent	Julien Thompson	TBA
92	40	"Toilet Zone"	Matthieu Chevallier	Sylvain Girault	TBA
93	41	"Auntie's Little Bibi"	Nathalie Dargent	Alexis Routhiau	TBA
94	42	"Washington the Wonder Dog"	Laure-Elisabeth Bourdaud and Johanna Goldschmidt	Julien Thompson	TBA
95	43	"A Wild Vacation"	Nicolas Verpilleux	Olivier Dutranoy	TBA
96	44	"Like Cats and Dogs"	Maxime Cormier	Ryan Chang Lam	TBA
97	45	"The Zipsters"	Laure-Elisabeth Bourdaud and Johanna Goldschmidt	Arthur Moncla	TBA
98	46	"Rabbit! Rabbit! Rabbit!"	Balthazar Chapuis	Stéphane Beau	TBA
99	47	"Living Room Diva"	Matthieu Chevallier and Anna Fregonese	Alexandre Hesse	TBA
100	48	"The Unicorn of Happiness"	Nathalie Dargent	Julien Thompson	TBA
101	49	"A Mitch of a Day"	Maxime Cormier	Sylvain Girault	TBA
102	50	"Samsses II"	Matthieu Chevallier	Ryan Chang Lam	TBA
103	51	"In the Beginning"	Laure-Elisabeth Bourdaud and Johanna Goldschmidt	Olivier Dutranoy	2020
104	52	"In the Beginning"	Laure-Elisabeth Bourdaud and Johanna Goldschmidt	Arthur Moncla	2020

== Crew ==
- Directed by: Lionel Allaix
- Produced by: Eric Garnet and Anne de Galard
- Series created by: Aurore Damant
- Based on an original idea by: Anne Ozannat
- Script editors: Cynthia True, Matthieu Chevallier (season 2), Johanna Goldschmidt (season 2)
- Music composed by: Séverin
- Executive Producer: Eric Garnet
- Associate Producer: Anne de Galard
- Line Producer: Emmanuel de Franceschi
- Production manager: Séverine Modzelewski (season 2)
- Production coordinators: Séverine Modzelewski, Amélie Oliveau, Lysa Jumelle (season 2)
- Production assistant: Zuka Lelashvili (season 2)
- 1st assistant directors: Stéphane Bevilacqua, Margaux Ollier (season 2)
- 2nd assistant directors: Mathias Cottreau, Matthias Pialoux (season 2)
- Script coordinator: Amélie Oliveau
- Digital content production (season 2): Amélie Oliveau, Agathe Fradet
- Translators: Leslie Damant-Jeandel, Manon Cranney, Rob Conrath, Justine Bannister, Patty Hannock (season 2), Jonathan Sly (season 2)
- Storyboarders (season 1): Lionel Allaix, Anthony Pascal, Christophe Pittet, Gark, Philippe Leconte, Thierry Sapyn, Baptiste Lucas, Nicolas Moschini, Nima Azarba, Fred Mintoff, Brice Magnier, Julien Thompson, Dominique Etchecopar, Olivier Derynck, and Ronan Le Brun
- Storyboarders (season 2): Lionel Allaix, Julien Thompson, Ryan Chang Lam, Alexandre Hesse, Sylvain Girault, Stéphane Beau, Maxime Mauboussin, Fredérick Chaillou, Yannick Zanchetta, Colin Albert, Mohamed Labidi, Ahmed Nasri, Alexis Routhiau, Camilo Collao, Olivier Dutranoy, Arthur Moncla
- Chief character designer: Marc Bascougnano
- Characters design (season 2): Érika Brémon, Mansoureh Kamaribidkorpeh, Hadrien Bonnet, Sylvain Bonnet, Éric Gosselet
- Background design team: Baptiste Lucas (season 1), Bertrand Piocelle (season 1), Tiphaine Schroeder (season 1), Thomas Greffard (season 1), Manuel Tanon-Tchi (season 1), Roland Di Constanzo (season 2), Sophie Castaignede (season 2)
- Props and FX designers: Louis-Gaël "Elger" Le Breton (season 1), Ahmed Guerrouache (season 1), François Maumont (season 1), José Lemaire (season 2)
- Colour Styling team: Caroline Vanden Abeele (season 1), Christine Lips (season 1), Sylvia Lorrain, Manuel Tanon-Tchi (season 1)
- Storyboard Assistants: Johann Cheneval (season 1), Cédric Frémeaux (season 1), Colin Albert (season 2)
- Animation Director: Julien Cayot
- Characters Builds: Mathieu Chaptel (season 1), Adeline Monin (season 1), Thomas Greffard (season 1)
- Animation References (season 1): Mathieu Chaptel, Caroline Piochon, Mourad Seddiki
- Layout Team: Franck Bonay (season 1), Miguel Larzillière (season 1), Brendan Merien (season 1)
- Chief animators: Christophe N'Guyen (season 1), Gary Dominguez, Juliette Laurent (season 1), Lisa Lussiez (season 2)
- Animatics editing: Fiona Couturier, Antoine Delaporte
- Final editing: Fiona Couturier, Antoine Delaporte
- Dialogues adapted by: Elise An, Antoine Ledoux (season 2), Clémentine Blayo-Nogret (season 2), Justine Dupont-Breitburd (season 2)
- Literary Bible: Aurore Damant, Anne Ozannat
- Graphic Bible: Aurore Damant, Manuel Tanon-Tchi
- Trainee: Juliette Cuisinier

== Broadcast ==
On January 28, 2016, GO-N Productions announced key deals for season one of the series in Europe. Signing on were RTVE for Clan – the number one kids channel in Spain – and AMC Networks Central Europe for Megamax, which broadcast Zip Zip in Hungary, the Czech Republic, Slovakia, Romania and Moldova. These partner additions meant that the series would air in almost every European, Middle Eastern, Baltic, Scandinavian, Latin American and Asian territory worldwide. Over 100 markets were covered through major broadcasters like Disney Channels (France, Italy, Netherlands, Russia, Israel, India, Southeast Asia, Korea, Japan, Australia & New Zealand, Latin America, and Brazil), Super RTL (Germany), SIC K (Portugal), SVT (Sweden), RÚV (Iceland), Etisalat (UAE), ITI Neovision (Poland), TV5Monde and DStv Kids (Angola & Mozanbique).

The series is currently broadcast in several countries worldwide, and has been rebroadcast since 2018 on France 4, from August 29, 2016 to March 24, 2020 on Disney XD France until March 24, 2020, and since August 26, 2019 on Disney Channel France. It has also aired on Teletoon+ in Poland, Disney XD in Australia and Italy, Family Channel and Télé-Québec in Canada, and Jetsen Huashi Wangju Kids in China.
