= Garfield: Escape from Monday =

- Cover art featuring Garfield (center) and antagonist Chef Monday (top)
- Developer: Osome Studio
- Publisher: Microids
- Director: Paul Lyaudet
- Producers: Brice Pinquet; Léo Zwaryszczuk
- Designers: Alexandre Delgery; Hugo Roche; Quentin Fourcade; Kenza Di Francesco; Esther Faynot; Damien Giros
- Programmers: Nicolas Sobczak; Dorian Antoinet; Clément Chastaingt; Paul Seren Rosso; Martin Wetischek
- Artists: Dorian L'Héritier; Dorian Collet; Laura Houdie; Mélanie Vagneck
- Writer: Laura Garcin
- Composer: Max Waffle
- Engine: Unreal Engine 5
- Platforms: Nintendo Switch; PlayStation 5; Windows; Xbox Series X/S
- Release: September 24, 2026
- Genre: Platform
- Mode: Single-player

Garfield: Escape from Monday is a 2026 platform game developed by OSome Studio and published by Microids for Nintendo Switch, PlayStation 5, Windows, and Xbox Series X/S. Based on the Garfield comic strip, it follows Garfield as he goes through a nightmare overrun by foods and an embodiment of the television cook Chef Monday. The player navigates through 3D linear levels collecting lasagna sheets and using Garfield's abilities, including those granted temporarily from costumes, to progress. Upon release, the game garnered mixed reception from critics. While reviewers praised its controls, they criticized its level design and unchallenging difficulty, while having mixed reactions towards the presentation.

== Gameplay ==
Garfield floating in the turkey costume to a nearby platform.

Garfield: Escape from Monday is a 3D platformer based on the Garfield comic strip. The game's plot involves Garfield, the player character, fainting after eating spinach lasagna made by his owner, Jon Arbuckle, who was inspired by a recipe from television cook Chef Monday. Garfield is then induced into a nightmare with an embodiment of Monday, who fills it with various foods such as vegetables, candy, and BBQ meat. The player is tasked with escaping the nightmare by playing levels and collecting sheets of lasagna and other snack items within them, with most of the sheets being hidden. Levels are mostly linear in design and are selected from an overworld map which contains forty seven stages spread across three worlds, with some of them being optional “challenge stages”. If the player collects enough lasagna, they can unlock cosmetic furniture for a manifestation of Jon's apartment.

Garfield has the ability to pounce to attack enemies and make longer jumps, and if the player continues to hold the pounce input, Garfield will enter into a roll which increases his movement speed until the input is released. The player has a total of three hit points which can be refilled with snack items if they are hit. If the player loses all of them, they respawn at the last reached checkpoint of a level, which can be found frequently throughout. Each world features a unique costume that can be found giving Garfield temporary abilities. These include a turkey costume that lets Garfield double jump and float briefly, surfer gear that lets him ride over water and grind on rails, and a cowboy outfit which gives a lasso to help cross gaps.

== Development and release ==
OSome Studio developed the game. Its publisher, Microids, announced the game on May 13, 2026, with a release set for September 24 in the same year. On June 19, Microids released the first trailer and reaffirmed its scheduled September release. Polygon's Giovanni Colantonio was surprised that the game was sticking to its release date, due to the amount of games releasing on the same day, including Control Resonant and Silent Hill: Townfall.

== Reception ==
Reception

Aggregate scores
Aggregator	Score
Metacritic	(PC) 64/100 (PS5) 68/100 (NS) 68/100
OpenCritic	38% recommend

Review scores
Publication	Score
IGN	5/10
CG Magazine	7.5/10
Cubed3	5/10
TheGamer	3.5/5
Softpedia	8/10

Escape from Monday received "mixed or average" reviews, according to review aggregator website Metacritic, with OpenCritic determining that 38% of critics recommended the game. The general consensus from critics was that the game was not as creative in design as other 3D platformers, but that the play control was excellent. TheGamer's George Foster viewed the game as one of 2026's most unexpectedly enjoyable games, while IGN's Sarah Thwaites felt that it was a step back in both design and originality.

The level design of the game was criticized by reviewers for being too simplistic and unchallenging. Giovanni Colantonio of Polygon, who framed his review as an imaginary conversation with his fourth-grade self, called the game "brainlessly easy", but thought he would likely have enjoyed it as a child. Thwaites felt that the abundance of checkpoints in levels detracted from the enjoyment of progression and made the game feel "frictionless" as a result. CG Magazine's Zubi Khan felt it was too easy while Luna Ericksson of Cubed3 described it as being basic yet entertaining, additionally noting how the costumes being limited to one world each limited the level design. Cosmin Vasile, writing for Softpedia, noted how the game was designed for children and that, while not difficult, it was highly accessible to the demographic.

Reviewers were mixed on the game's presentation. The art style was praised by most critics, including Thwaites who found the level aesthetics to be charming while Vasile enjoyed the game's vibrant colors. Some reviewers, such as Thwaites, criticized Garfield's dialogue, while Foster found it to be well-written but that Garfield's voice was too energetic and whiny for the character. Colantonio felt negatively on both Garfield's dialogue and voice, additionally noting how the game's levels, while set in a nightmare, contradicted the story presented to the player.

The platforming control was received generally positively by critics. Foster found Garfield's movement to be athletic and free flowing, noting how levels could be quickly traversed relatively easily, while Ericksson described the controls as "smooth and clever". The costumes were viewed as one of the better aspects of play for Khan, who felt they added interesting variety. Thwaites perceived the control as being too sluggish, describing it as "wading through honey".
