= Doug Molitor =

American television screenwriter

- Occupation: Screenwriter
- Writing career
- Language: English

Doug Molitor is an American television screenwriter.

He has written for TV programs including Adventure Inc., Sliders, F/X: The Series, Lucky Luke, Police Academy: The Series, You Can't Take It with You, Sledge Hammer!, Young Hercules, Ritas Welt (Rita's World), Dinosaucers, James Bond Jr., and Deepwater Black (U.S. title: Mission Genesis).

Molitor won the American Accolades TV & Shorts Competition for "Farewell to Tuvalu", an episode of The West Wing, and was nominated for a Humanitas Prize for his work on the Captain Planet and the Planeteers episode "The Ark".

He wrote for the Italian television series Lucky Luke. He was selected by the Writers Guild of America to participate in Writers Access Project.

In 1987, Molitor was a four-time Jeopardy! champion and competed in the Jeopardy! Tournament of Champions. He later competed in the 1993 10th Anniversary Tournament and the 2025 Invitational Tournament.

== Television credits ==
- Dinosaucers (1987)
- Sledge Hammer! (1987)
- Maxie's World (1987)
- Beverly Hills Teens (1987)
- Police Academy (1989–1990)
- The New Adventures of He-Man (1990)
- Camp Candy (1990)
- The Wizard of Oz (1990)
- Teenage Mutant Ninja Turtles (1990)
- Captain Planet and the Planeteers (1990–1992, 1994): seasons 1-3 head writer
- James Bond Jr. (1991)
- Bill & Ted's Excellent Adventures (1991)
- Beetlejuice (1991)
- Lucky Luke (1992)
- Adventures of Sonic the Hedgehog (1993)
- The All-New Dennis the Menace (1993)
- Free Willy (1994)
- Where on Earth Is Carmen Sandiego? (1994–1995, 1998–1999)
- Oscar's Orchestra (1995)
- Mega Man (1995)
- Vor-Tech: Undercover Conversion Squad (1996)
- Hurricanes (1996)
- Dennis and Gnasher (1996)
- Billy the Cat (1997)
- Extreme Dinosaurs (1997)
- Police Academy: The Series (1997)
- F/X: The Series (1997)
- Deepwater Black (1997)
- The Fantastic Voyages of Sinbad the Sailor (1998)
- Pocket Dragon Adventures (1998)
- The New Adventures of Zorro (1998)
- Young Hercules (1998)
- Roswell Conspiracies: Aliens, Myths and Legends (1999)
- Sliders (1999)
- Sabrina: The Animated Series (1999)
- Ritas Welt (1999)
- Flight Squad (2001)
- Sitting Ducks (2002)
- Totally Spies! (2002)
- X-Men: Evolution (2002)
- Adventure Inc. (2002)
- Gadget & the Gadgetinis (2003)
- Pet Alien (2005)
- Class of the Titans (2006)
- Sushi Pack (2007)
- Pucca (2008)
- The Future Is Wild (2008)
- Grossology (2008–2009)
- Shelldon (2009)
- The Penguins of Madagascar (2009)
- Hot Wheels Battle Force 5 (2010)
- Kid vs. Kat (2011)
- Transformers: Rescue Bots (2016)
- Team Zenko Go (2022)
