= Red Thunder (musical group) =

Red Thunder is a rock band formed in 1990 by frontman Robby Romero, incorporating Native American musical instruments, melody and themes, a style sometimes called by the pun "alter-native". Red Thunder rose to prominence with founder Robby Romero's designation as a United Nations Ambassador of Youth for the Environment in 1990, the heavy rotation of his singles on VH1 and MTV, and the worldwide airing of his social- and environmental-themed films (including America’s Last Frontier, Hidden Medicine and Makoce Wakan),

== Discography ==
Robby Romero

- All The Missing Children (1990 Eagle Thunder Records)
- Is It Too Late (1990, Eagle Thunder Records)
- Red Thunder (1994, Eagle Thunder Records)
- 'Makoce Wakan (1995, Eagle Thunder Records)
- Hidden Medicine (1999, Eagle Thunder Records)
- Americas Last Frontier (2002, Eagle Thunder Records)
- Native Children's Survival (2005, Eagle Thunder Records)
- Painting The World (2008, Eagle Thunder Records)
- Who's Gonna Save You (2012, Eagle Thunder Records)
- Iron Horse (2014, Eagle Thunder Records)
- Born On The Rez (2018, Eagle Thunder Records)
- 25th Anniversary (2019, Eagle Thunder Records)
