= List of children's animated television series of the 1990s =

This is a list of children's animated television series (including internet television series); that is, animated programs originally targeted towards audiences aged 12 and under in mind.

This list does not include Japanese, Chinese, or Korean series, as children's animation is much more common in these regions.

== 1990s ==
=== United States ===
Title	Genre	Seasons/episodes	Show creator(s)	Original release	Network	Studio	Age rating	Technique
The Adventures of Super Mario Bros. 3	Adventure; Fantasy	26 episodes	Shigeru Miyamoto (original characters)	September 8, 1990 – December 1, 1990	NBC (United States); Italia 1 (Italy)	DIC Animation City; Nintendo; Reteitalia, S.p.A.; Sei Young Animation	TV-Y7	Traditional
Gravedale High	Comedy; Science fiction	1 season, 13 episodes	David Kirschner	September 8, 1990 – December 1, 1990	NBC	H-B Production Co.; NBC Productions	TV-Y7	Traditional
Kid 'n Play		1 season, 13 episodes		September 8, 1990 – December 8, 1990	NBC	Marvel Productions; Saban Entertainment	TV-Y7	Traditional
New Kids on the Block	Comedy	1 season, 15 episodes		September 8, 1990 – December 14, 1990	ABC	DIC Animation City	TV-Y7	Traditional
The Wizard of Oz	Action; Adventure; Comedy; Fantasy; Musical	1 season, 13 episodes	Doug Molitor	September 8, 1990 – December 28, 1990	ABC	DIC Animation City; Turner Entertainment Co.	TV-Y	Traditional
Attack of the Killer Tomatoes	Comedy; Science fiction	2 seasons, 21 episodes	Richard Mueller	September 8, 1990 – November 23, 1991	Fox Kids	Marvel Productions; Fox Children's Productions	TV-Y7	Traditional
Bobby's World	Comedy; Fantasy	7 seasons, 81 episodes	Howie Mandel	September 8, 1990 – February 23, 1998	Fox Kids	Film Roman; Alevy Productions	TV-Y	Traditional
Tom & Jerry Kids	Slapstick comedy; Absurd humor	4 seasons, 65 episodes	Don Lusk; Paul Sommer; Carl Urbano	September 8, 1990 – December 4, 1993	Fox Kids	H-B Production Co.; Turner Entertainment	TV-Y	Traditional
Tiny Toon Adventures	Adventure; Comedy; Fantasy; Musical; Slapstick; Satire	3 seasons, 100 episodes	Tom Ruegger	September 14, 1990 – May 28, 1995	CBS (pilot only); Syndicated (1990–92); Fox Kids (1992–95)	Warner Bros. Animation; Amblin Entertainment	TV-Y7	Traditional
Captain Planet and the Planeteers	Superhero fiction Action; Adventure; Edutainment	6 seasons, 113 episodes	Ted Turner; Barbara Pyle; Robert Larkin III	September 15, 1990 – May 11, 1996	TBS	DIC Enterprises (1990–92, seasons 1–3); Hanna-Barbera Cartoons (1993–96)	TV-Y7	Traditional
Piggsburg Pigs!	Comedy	1 season, 13 episodes	Melissa Silverman	September 15, 1990 – December 15, 1990	Fox Kids	The Fred Silverman Company; Ruby-Spears Productions; The Sy Fischer Company	—N/a	Traditional
Merrie Melodies Starring Bugs Bunny & Friends	Anthology	1 season, 65 episodes		September 17, 1990 – September 9, 1994	• Syndication • Fox Kids	Warner Bros. Animation	—N/a	Traditional
Wake, Rattle, and Roll	Comedy	1 season, 50 episodes		September 17, 1990 – January 18, 1991	Syndication	Hanna-Barbera	—N/a	Traditional
The Pirates of Dark Water	Action; Adventure; Fantasy	2 seasons, 21 episodes	David Kirschner	February 25, 1991 – May 23, 1993	ABC (season 1); First-run syndication (season 2)	H-B Production Co. in association with: Fil-Cartoons; Tama Production (season 1); Mr. Big Cartoons (season 1); Wang Film Productions (season 1); Additional animation: Kennedy Cartoons (uncredited); Big Star (uncredited)	TV-Y7	Traditional
Doug	Comedy; Adventure	7 seasons, 117 episodes	Jim Jinkins	August 11, 1991 – January 2, 1994; September 7, 1996 – April 12, 1999	Nickelodeon (1991–94); ABC (1996–99)	Jumbo Pictures; Games Animation (seasons 1–4); Ellipse Programme (seasons 2–4); Walt Disney Television Animation (seasons 5–7)	TV-Y7	Traditional (Cel (Seasons 1-7)/Digital ink-and-paint, and color (Seasons 3-7)
The Ren & Stimpy Show	Comedy; Surreal humor Adventure	5 seasons, 93 episodes	John Kricfalusi	August 11, 1991 – October 20, 1996	Nickelodeon (1991–95); MTV (1993–96)	Carbunkle Cartoons (seasons 1–2); Spümcø; Games Animation (seasons 2–5); MTV Productions (seasons 2–5); MTV Animation (seasons 2–5)	TV-Y7; TV-PG; TV-14	Traditional (Cel (seasons 1-5)/Digital ink-and-paint, and color (season 5))
Rugrats	Comedy; Adventure; Slice of life	9 seasons, 172 episodes	Arlene Klasky; Gábor Csupó; Paul Germain	August 11, 1991 – June 8, 2004	Nickelodeon	Klasky Csupo; Games Animation (1991–97); Nickelodeon Animation Studio (1998–2004)	TV-Y	Traditional (Cel (seasons 1-6)/Digital ink-and-paint, and color (seasons 2-9))
Taz-Mania	Comedy	4 seasons, 65 episodes		September 7, 1991 – May 22, 1995	Fox Kids	Warner Bros. Animation	TV-Y	Traditional
Darkwing Duck	Superhero fiction Comedy	3 seasons, 91 episodes	Tad Stones	September 8, 1991 – December 5, 1992	ABC	Walt Disney Television Animation; Walt Disney Television	TV-Y7	Traditional
Mother Goose and Grimm	Animated	2 seasons, 13 episodes	Mike Peters	September 14, 1991 – 1992	CBS	Tribune Media Services; Grimmy, Inc. Lee Mendelson Productions; Film Roman; MGM Television; MGM-Pathe Communications	TV-G	Traditional
Back to the Future	Adventure; Fantasy; Science fiction	2 seasons, 26 episodes	* Robert Zemeckis * Bob Gale	September 14, 1991 – December 26, 1992	CBS; France 2	Universal Cartoon Studios; Zaloom/Mayfield Productions; BIG Pictures; Amblin Television	TV-Y7	Traditional
Space Cats	Animation; Adventure; Comedy	1 season, 13 episodes	Paul Fusco	September 14, 1991 – July 25, 1992	NBC	Marvel Productions; Paul Fusco Productions	—N/a	Traditional
Yo Yogi!	Animation; Adventure; Comedy; Mystery	13 episodes		September 14, 1991 – December 14, 1991	NBC	Hanna-Barbera Productions	TV-Y	Traditional
Batman: The Animated Series	Crime; Neo-noir; Superhero	2 seasons, 85 episodes	Eric Radomski; Bruce Timm	September 5, 1992 – September 15, 1995	Fox Kids	DIC Entertainment; Warner Bros. Animation	TV-Y7	Traditional
Goof Troop	Animated; Animated sitcom	1 season, 78 episodes & 1 special	Robert Taylor; Michael Peraza Jr.	September 5, 1992 – December 5, 1993	The Disney Channel (1992); Syndication (65 epsiodes); ABC (14 episodes)	Walt Disney Television Animation; Walt Disney Television	TV-Y	Traditional
The Little Mermaid	Children's television series Fantasy	3 seasons, 31 episodes		September 11, 1992 – November 26, 1994	CBS	Walt Disney Television Animation	TV-Y	Traditional
Wild West C.O.W.-Boys of Moo Mesa	Western	2 seasons, 26 episodes	Ryan Brown	September 12, 1992 – December 4, 1993	ABC	King World Productions; Greengrass Productions; Gunther-Wahl Productions (1992, season 1); Ruby-Spears Enterprises (1993, season 2); Flextech Television; Mini Mountain Productions	TV-Y	Traditional
The Addams Family (1992)	Animation; Comedy horror	2 seasons, 21 episodes		September 14, 1992 – November 6, 1993	ABC	H-B Production Co.	TV-Y	Traditional
The Plucky Duck Show		1 season, 13 episodes	Tom Ruegger (uncredited)	September 19, 1992 – November 28, 1992	Fox Kids	Warner Bros. Animation; Amblin Entertainment	TV-Y	Traditional
Raw Toonage	Wackiness; Comedy; Cartoon	1 season, 12 episodes		September 19, 1992 – December 5, 1992	CBS	Walt Disney Television Animation; Marsu Productions (Marsupilami segments only)	TV-Y	Traditional
ToonHeads	Anthology	8 seasons, 102 episodes		October 2, 1992 – November 23, 2003	Cartoon Network		—N/a	Traditional
American Heroes & Legends	Animated; Fantasy	11 episodes		October 14, 1992 – October 10, 1993	Showtime	Rabbit Ears Productions	—N/a	Traditional
Donald's Quack Attack	Anthology	1 season, 96 episodes		November 2, 1992 – 1997	Disney Channel	The Walt Disney Company	—N/a	Traditional
Mickey's Mouse Tracks	Anthology	1 season, 78 episodes		November 2, 1992 – 1995	Disney Channel	The Walt Disney Company	—N/a	Traditional
Bonkers	• Crime-comedy • Mystery • Slapstick comedy	1 season, 65 episodes	• Greg Weisman • Duane Capizzi • Robert Hathcock • Richard Trueblood • Len Smith • Larry Latham	September 4, 1993 – February 23, 1994	• The Disney Channel (1993) • Broadcast syndication (1993–94)	Walt Disney Television Animation	TV-Y	Traditional
2 Stupid Dogs	Comedy	2 seasons, 26 episodes	Donovan Cook	September 5, 1993 – May 15, 1995	TBS	Hanna-Barbera	TV-Y7	Traditional
Droopy, Master Detective	Film noir Comedy; Satire	1 season, 13 episodes		September 13 – December 4, 1993	Fox Kids	Hanna-Barbera; Metro-Goldwyn-Mayer	TV-Y	Traditional
SWAT Kats: The Radical Squadron	Action/Adventure; Fantasy; Superhero	2 seasons, 26 episodes	Christian Tremblay; Yvon Tremblay	September 11, 1993 – January 6, 1995	TBS	Turner Entertainment; Turner Program Services; Warner Bros. Television Studios	TV-Y7	Traditional
Animaniacs (1993)	Comedy; Musical; Satire; Slapstick	5 seasons, 99 episodes	Tom Ruegger	September 13, 1993 – November 14, 1998	Fox Kids (1993–94); Kids' WB (1995–98)	Warner Bros. Animation; Amblin Entertainment	TV-Y	Traditional
Cro		20 episodes		September 18, 1993 – October 22, 1994	ABC	Children's Television Workshop (CTW); Film Roman	TV-Y	Traditional
Marsupilami	Animated series Comedy	1 season, 13 episodes	André Franquin	September 18, 1993 – December 11, 1993	CBS	Walt Disney Television Animation	TV-Y7	Traditional
Rocko's Modern Life	Surreal comedy Satire	4 seasons, 52 episodes	Joe Murray	September 18, 1993 – November 24, 1996	Nickelodeon	Joe Murray Productions; Games Animation	TV-Y7; TV-14	Traditional (Cel (seasons 1-4)/Digital ink-and-paint, and color (season 4))
The Moxy Show	Anthology	1 season, 24 episodes	Brad DeGraf	December 5, 1993 – December 25, 1995	Cartoon Network	Colossal Pictures	TV-Y7	CGI
Where on Earth Is Carmen Sandiego?	Adventure; Mystery; Edutainment	4 seasons, 40 episodes		February 5, 1994 – January 2, 1999	Fox Kids	DIC Entertainment	TV-Y7	Traditional
Aladdin	Action–adventure; Fantasy	3 seasons, 86 episodes		February 6, 1994 – November 25, 1995	The Disney Channel; Syndication; CBS	Walt Disney Television; Walt Disney Television Animation	TV-Y7	Traditional
Conan and the Young Warriors	Cartoon; Children's fantasy	1 season, 13 episodes		March 5, 1994 – August 27, 1994	CBS	Sunbow Productions; Graz Entertainment; Hanho Studios; AKOM	—N/a	Traditional
Beethoven	Comedy	26 episodes		September 10, 1994 – December 3, 1994	CBS	Northern Lights Entertainment; Universal Cartoon Studios	TV-Y7	Traditional
Bump in the Night	Comedy	2 seasons, 27 episodes	Ken Pontac; David Bleiman	September 10, 1994 – December 9, 1995	ABC	Danger Productions; Greengrass Productions	TV-Y	Stop-motion
The Tick	Superhero; Comedy; Satire	3 seasons, 36 episodes	Ben Edlund	September 10, 1994 – November 24, 1996	Fox Kids	Sunbow Entertainment; Graz Entertainment; AKOM	TV-Y7	Traditional
Skeleton Warriors	Science fiction Horror	1 season, 13 episodes	Gary Goddard	September 17, 1994 – December 10, 1994	CBS	Landmark Entertainment Group; Graz Entertainment Inc.	TV-Y7	Traditional
Gargoyles	Animation; Urban fantasy Mythology; Science fiction	3 seasons, 78 episodes		October 24, 1994 – February 15, 1997	Syndicated (1994–96); ABC (1996–97)	Walt Disney Television Animation; Jade Animation (Seasons 1–2); Tama Productions (Seasons 1–2)	TV-Y7	Traditional
Aaahh!!! Real Monsters	Comedy; Fantasy	4 seasons, 52 episodes	Gábor Csupó; Peter Gaffney	October 29, 1994 – December 6, 1997	Nickelodeon	Klasky Csupo; Games Animation	TV-Y7	Traditional
Spider-Man	Superhero; Action adventure Science fiction	5 seasons, 65 episodes		November 19, 1994 – January 31, 1998	Fox Kids	* Marvel Entertainment Group; Marvel Films Animation; Tokyo Movie Shinsha	TV-Y7	Traditional
What a Cartoon!	Anthology; Comedy; Variety	1 season, 48 episodes	Fred Seibert	February 20, 1995 – November 28, 1997	Cartoon Network	Cartoon Network Studios (1996–97); Hanna-Barbera (1995–97)	TV-Y7/TV-G	Traditional (Episodes 1–38, 40–48); CGI (Episode 39 "Strange Things")
Happily Ever After: Fairy Tales for Every Child	Anthology	3 seasons, 39 episodes	Robert Guillaume	March 12, 1995 – July 18, 2000	HBO Family	Hyperion Pictures; Two Oceans Entertainment Group; Wonderwings.com Entertainment; Confetti Entertainment Company; HBO; The Jim Henson Company	TV-Y	Traditional
The Mask: Animated Series	Superhero; Surreal humour Action; Adventure; Comedy; Slapstick	3 seasons, 54 episodes		September 8, 1995 – September 24, 1999	CBS	Dark Horse Entertainment; Film Roman; Sunbow Entertainment; New Line Television	TV-Y7	Traditional
Timon & Pumbaa	Adventure; Comedy; Slapstick	3 seasons, 85 episodes		September 8, 1995 – September 24, 1999	Syndication; CBS; Toon Disney (season 3)	Walt Disney Television; Walt Disney Television Animation	TV-Y7	Traditional
Freakazoid!		2 seasons, 24 episodes	Bruce Timm; Paul Dini	September 9, 1995 – June 1, 1997	Kids' WB	Warner Bros. Animation; Amblin Entertainment	TV-G	Traditional
Pinky and the Brain	Comic science fiction	4 seasons, 66 episodes	Tom Ruegger	September 10, 1995 – November 14, 1998	Kids' WB	Warner Bros. Animation	TV-Y7	Traditional
The Sylvester & Tweety Mysteries		5 seasons, 52 episodes		September 9, 1995 – December 18, 2002	Kids' WB (1995–2000); Cartoon Network (2002)	Warner Bros. Animation	TV-G	Traditional
Monster Mania	Adventure; Fantasy; Horror	1 season, 26 episodes	Phil Mendez	September 11, 1995 – 1996	Syndication	Hallmark Entertainment; Kookanooga Toons; Action Media Group	—N/a	Traditional
Littlest Pet Shop (1995)	Adventure; Comedy	1 season, 40 episodes		September 11 – November 3, 1995	Syndication (United States); M6 Kid (France)	Sunbow Entertainment; Créativité & Développement; AB Productions	—N/a	Traditional
Bugs 'n' Daffy	Anthology	2 seasons, 130 episodes		September 11, 1995 – September 12, 1998	Kids' WB	Warner Bros. Animation	—N/a	Traditional
Cartoon Planet	Comedy; Variety	3 seasons, 146 episodes	Keith Crofford; Mike Lazzo	Original: September 10, 1995 – February 4, 1998; Revival: March 30, 2012 – February 8, 2014	TBS (1995–98); Cartoon Network (2012–14)	Ghost Planet Industries (1995–98); Turner Studios (2012–14)	TV-Y7	Traditional (seasons 1–2)/Flash (season 3)
Santo Bugito	Children's programming	1 season, 13 episodes	Arlene Klasky	September 16, 1995 – August 17, 1996	CBS	Anivision; Klasky-Csupo	—N/a	Traditional
The Twisted Tales of Felix the Cat	Children's television series Comedy; Surreal humour	2 seasons, 21 episodes	Pat Sullivan; Otto Messmer; Joe Oriolo (characters)	September 16, 1995 – April 12, 1997	CBS	Felix the Cat Productions; Film Roman; Wang Film Productions (uncredited)	TV-G	Traditional
The Adventures of Hyperman	Superhero comedy	1 season, 13 episodes		October 14, 1995 – August 10, 1996	CBS	Columbia Pictures Television; Sunbow Productions; Hyperion Animation	—N/a	Traditional
Dumb and Dumber		13 episodes		October 28, 1995 – February 3, 1996	ABC	Hanna-Barbera Cartoons; New Line Television	TV-Y7	Traditional
C Bear and Jamal	Adventure; Comedy; Musical	2 seasons, 13 episodes	Earl Richey Jones; Todd R. Jones	February 3, 1996 – February 22, 1997	Fox Kids	Film Roman; Taurus Film GmbH & Co	TV-Y	Traditional
Dexter's Laboratory	Comic science fiction	4 seasons, 78 episodes	Genndy Tartakovsky	April 27, 1996 – November 20, 2003	Cartoon Network	Hanna-Barbera Cartoons (1997–99); Cartoon Network Studios (1996–97, 2001–03)	TV-G	Traditional
The Real Adventures of Jonny Quest	Adventure; Drama; Sci-fi	2 seasons, 52 episodes		August 26, 1996 – April 16, 1997	Cartoon Network	Hanna-Barbera	TV-Y7	Traditional
Adventures from the Book of Virtues	Anthology	3 seasons, 39 episodes	Bruce D. Johnson	September 2, 1996 – December 17, 2000	PBS	KCET; PorchLight Entertainment; Fox Animation Studios	TV-Y7	Traditional
Mighty Ducks: The Animated Series	Action/Adventure; Science fantasy Superhero; Comedy; Sports	1 season, 26 episodes	Marty Isenberg; Robert N. Skir; David Wise	September 6, 1996 – January 17, 1997	ABC; Syndication	Anaheim Ducks; Walt Disney Television; Walt Disney Television Animation	TV-Y7	Traditional
Superman: The Animated Series	Superhero; Action; Adventure; Drama	3 seasons, 54 episodes		September 6, 1996 – February 12, 2000	Kids' WB	Warner Bros. Animation	TV-Y7	Traditional
Road Rovers		1 season, 13 episodes	Tom Ruegger; Jeff Gordon	September 7, 1996 – February 22, 1997	Kids' WB	Warner Bros. Animation	TV-Y	Traditional
Blue's Clues	Preschool; Educational	6 seasons, 143 episodes	Traci Paige Johnson; Todd Kessler; Angela Santomero	September 8, 1996 – August 6, 2006	Nick Jr. Channel	Nickelodeon Animation Studio	TV-Y	Flash/Live-action
Project G.e.e.K.e.R.	Action; Adventure; Comedy; Science fiction	1 season, 13 episodes	Douglas TenNapel; Doug Langdale	September 14, 1996 – December 7, 1996	CBS	Doug²; Adelaide Productions; Columbia TriStar Television	—N/a	Traditional
Cave Kids	Adventure	1 season, 8 episodes		September 21, 1996 – November 9, 1996	Cartoon Network	Hanna-Barbera	TV-G	Traditional
Jungle Cubs	Adventure; Children's; Comedy; Fantasy	2 seasons, 21 episodes	Mark S. Bernthal	October 5, 1996 – January 10, 1998	ABC	Walt Disney Television Animation	TV-Y	Traditional
Hey Arnold!	Comedy	5 seasons, 100 episodes	Craig Bartlett	October 7, 1996 – June 8, 2004	Nickelodeon	Snee-Oosh, Inc. Nickelodeon Animation Studio	TV-Y7	Traditional (Cel (seasons 1-3)/Digital ink-and-paint, and color (seasons 4-5))
KaBlam!	Comedy; Musical; Variety; Slapstick	4 seasons, 48 episodes	Robert Mittenthal; Will McRobb; Chris Viscardi; Michael Pearlstein; Cote Zellers; Albie Hecht	October 7, 1996 – January 22, 2000	Nickelodeon	Nickelodeon Animation Studio; Flying Mallet, Inc. (season 4)	TV-Y7	Traditional/Stop-motion
Waynehead	Adventure; Comedy	1 season, 13 episodes	Damon Wayans (uncredited)	October 19, 1996 – May 17, 1997	Kids' WB	Nelvana; Warner Bros. Television Animation; Philippine Animation Studio, Inc. Hanho Heung-Up Co., Ltd. TMS-Kyokuchi Corporation	TV-Y	Traditional
The Angry Beavers	Comedy	4 seasons, 62 episodes	Mitch Schauer	April 19, 1997 – November 11, 2001	Nickelodeon	Nickelodeon Animation Studio; Gunther-Wahl Productions	TV-Y7	Traditional
Nightmare Ned	Comedy horror	25 episodes	Terry Shakespeare; G. Sue Shakespeare; David Molina	April 19, 1997 – August 9, 1997	ABC	Walt Disney Television Animation; Creative Capers Entertainment	TV-Y7	Traditional
Johnny Bravo	Comedy	4 seasons, 65 episodes	Van Partible	July 14, 1997 – August 27, 2004	Cartoon Network	Hanna-Barbera (1997–2002); Cartoon Network Studios (2001–04)	TV-Y7	Traditional
Cow and Chicken	Surreal comedy	4 seasons, 52 episodes	David Feiss	July 15, 1997 – July 24, 1999	Cartoon Network	Hanna-Barbera	TV-Y7	Traditional
I Am Weasel	Comedy	5 seasons, 79 episodes	David Feiss	July 15, 1997 – 2000	Cartoon Network	Hanna-Barbera	TV-Y7	Traditional
Recess	Children's television series Comedy	4 seasons, 65 episodes	Paul Germain; Joe Ansolabehere	August 31, 1997 – November 5, 2001	ABC (One Saturday Morning/ABC Kids); UPN (Disney's One Too); Toon Disney	Walt Disney Television Animation; Paul & Joe Productions (2000–01, reruns & specials only); Grimsaem; Plus One Animation; Sunwoo Animation; Toon City	TV-Y	Traditional
101 Dalmatians: The Series	Comedy; Adventure	1 season, 65 episodes		September 1, 1997 – March 4, 1998	ABC (1997–1998, 13 episodes); Syndication (1997–1998, 52 episodes)	Jumbo Pictures; Walt Disney Television Animation	TV-Y	Traditional
Pepper Ann	Animated sitcom Teen comedy Comedy drama	4 seasons, 65 episodes	Sue Rose	September 13, 1997 – November 30, 2001	ABC (1997–2001); UPN (2000); Disney Channel (2001)	Walt Disney Television Animation	TV-Y	Traditional
Science Court	Animation/nontraditional court show	3 seasons, 29 episodes	Tom Snyder	September 13, 1997 – January 22, 2000	ABC	Burns & Burns Productions; Tom Snyder Productions	TV-Y	Traditional
The Weird Al Show	Comedy	1 season, 13 episodes	"Weird Al" Yankovic	September 13 – December 6, 1997	CBS	Ear Booker Productions; Dick Clark Productions	TV-Y7	Traditional/CGI/Stop-motion/Live-action
The New Batman Adventures	Superhero; Action; Adventure; Mystery; Thriller; Drama	24 episodes	Bruce Timm; Paul Dini	September 13, 1997 – January 16, 1999	Kids' WB	DC Comics; Warner Bros. Animation	TV-Y7	Traditional
The New Batman/Superman Adventures		2 seasons, 130 episodes		September 13, 1997 – February 12, 2000	Kids' WB	DC Comics; Warner Bros. Animation	—N/a	Traditional
The Ink and Paint Club	Anthology	1 season, 60 episodes		September 22, 1997 – February 5, 1998	Disney Channel	The Walt Disney Company	—N/a	Traditional
Salty's Lighthouse		1 season, 20 episodes		October 3, 1997 – February 13, 1998	TLC	Sunbow Entertainment	TV-Y	Traditional
Men in Black: The Series	Action; Adventure; Science fiction comedy	4 seasons, 53 episodes	Jim George	October 11, 1997 – June 30, 2001	Kids' WB	Adelaide Productions; Amblin Entertainment; Columbia TriStar Television	TV-Y7	Traditional
Channel Umptee-3		1 season, 13 episodes	Jim George	October 20, 1997 – February 25, 1998	Kids' WB	Adelaide Productions; Act III Television; Enchanted George Productions; Columbia TriStar Television	TV-Y	Traditional
Toonsylvania		2 seasons, 21 episodes	Bill Kopp; Chris Otsuki	February 7, 1998 – January 18, 1999	Fox Kids	DreamWorks Animation Television	TV-Y	Traditional
PB&J Otter	Musical	3 seasons, 65 episodes	Jim Jinkins	March 15, 1998 – October 15, 2000	Playhouse Disney	Walt Disney Television Animation; Jumbo Pictures; Plus One Animation	TV-Y	Traditional
CatDog	Comedy	4 seasons, 68 episodes	Peter Hannan	April 4, 1998 – June 15, 2005	Nickelodeon (1998–2005); Nicktoons (2003–05)	Nickelodeon Animation Studio; Peter Hannan Studios; Saerom Animation; Rough Draft Studios	TV-Y7	Traditional
Oh Yeah! Cartoons	Comedy	3 seasons, 32 episodes	Fred Seibert	July 18, 1998 – July 19, 2002	Nickelodeon	Nickelodeon Animation Studio; Frederator Incorporated	TV-Y7	Traditional
Hercules	Comedy; Fantasy	2 seasons, 65 episodes		August 31, 1998 – March 1, 1999	ABC; Syndication	Walt Disney Television Animation; Pattyson/Meadows Productions	TV-Y	Traditional
The Wild Thornberrys	Adventure; Comedy	5 seasons, 91 episodes	Arlene Klasky; Gábor Csupó; Steve Pepoon; David Silverman; Stephen Sustarsic	September 1, 1998 – June 11, 2004	Nickelodeon	Klasky Csupo; Nickelodeon Animation Studio	TV-Y7	Traditional
Mad Jack the Pirate	Adventure; Comedy; Fantasy	1 season, 13 episodes	Bill Kopp	September 12, 1998 – February 27, 1999	Fox Kids	Saban Entertainment	TV-Y	Traditional
The Secret Files of the Spy Dogs	Adventure; Mystery; Comedy; Speculative fiction Spy-fi	4 seasons, 40 episodes	Jim Benton	September 12, 1998 – 1999	Fox Kids	Saban Entertainment	TV-Y	Traditional
Histeria!		2 seasons, 52 episodes	Tom Ruegger	September 14, 1998 – March 31, 2000	Kids' WB	Warner Bros. Animation	TV-Y	Traditional
Pinky, Elmyra & the Brain	Comedy; Crossover fiction	1 season, 13 episodes	Tom Ruegger (uncredited)	September 19, 1998 – April 10, 1999	Kids' WB	Warner Bros. Animation	—N/a	Traditional
Jay Jay the Jet Plane	Musical	4 seasons, 62 episodes	David Michel; Deborah Michel	November 2, 1998 – November 25, 2005	TLC (1998–2000); PBS Kids (2001–05)	PorchLight Entertainment; Modern Cartoons; Wonderwings.com Entertainment; Knightscove Family Films	TV-Y	CGI/Live-action
The Powerpuff Girls	Superhero; Action Adventure	6 seasons, 78 episodes	Craig McCracken	November 18, 1998 – March 25, 2005	Cartoon Network	Hanna-Barbera Cartoons (1998–2002); Cartoon Network Studios (2003–05)	TV-Y7	Traditional
Batman Beyond	Superhero; Adventure; Science fiction Action; Mystery; Crime; Suspense; Cyberpunk; Drama; Teen drama	3 seasons, 52 episodes	Bruce Timm; Paul Dini; Alan Burnett	January 10, 1999 – December 18, 2001	Kids' WB	DC Comics; Warner Bros. Animation	TV-Y7	Traditional
The Cat&Birdy Warneroonie PinkyBrainy Big Cartoonie Show				January 16, 1999 – August 31, 2000	Kids' WB	Warner Bros. Animation	—N/a	Traditional
A Little Curious	Comedy; Educational	2 seasons, 43 episodes	Steve Oakes	February 1, 1999 – August 15, 2000	HBO Family	Curious Pictures	TV-Y	CGI/Stop-motion/Traditional/Flash
Mickey Mouse Works	Comedy	2 seasons, 25 episodes	Bobs Gannaway	May 1, 1999 – December 16, 2000	ABC (Disney's One Saturday Morning)	Walt Disney Television Animation	TV-Y	Traditional
SpongeBob SquarePants	Comedy; Surreal comedy Slapstick; Animated sitcom	16 seasons, 329 episodes	Stephen Hillenburg	May 1, 1999 – present	Nickelodeon	United Plankton Pictures; Nickelodeon Animation Studio	TV-Y7	Traditional/Live action
The New Woody Woodpecker Show	Comedy	3 seasons, 53 episodes	Bob Jaques	May 8, 1999 – July 27, 2002	Fox Kids	Universal Cartoon Studios; Universal Television	TV-Y	Traditional
Rocket Power	Adventure; Sports	4 seasons, 71 episodes	Arlene Klasky; Gábor Csupó	August 16, 1999 – July 30, 2004	Nickelodeon	Klasky Csupo; Nickelodeon Animation Studio	TV-Y7	Traditional
Sabrina: The Animated Series		1 season, 65 episodes		September 6, 1999 – February 27, 2000	UPN (Disney's One Too); ABC (Disney's One Saturday Morning)	Walt Disney Television Animation	TV-Y7	Traditional
Detention	Comedy	1 season, 13 episodes	Bob Doucette	September 11, 1999 – March 25, 2000	Kids' WB	Warner Bros. Animation	—N/a	Traditional
Big Guy and Rusty the Boy Robot	Science fiction Superhero	2 seasons, 26 episodes		September 18, 1999 – March 5, 2001	Fox Kids	Adelaide Productions; Dark Horse Entertainment; Columbia TriStar Television	TV-Y7	Traditional
Xyber 9: New Dawn	Science fiction	2 seasons, 26 episodes		September 18, 1999 – March 5, 2001	Fox Kids	Bokabi Productions; Saban Entertainment	TV-Y7	Traditional
Mike, Lu, & Og	Comedy	2 seasons, 26 episodes	Mikhail Shindel; Mikhail Aldashin; Charles Swenson	November 12, 1999 – May 27, 2001	Cartoon Network	Kinofilm; Studio Pilot	TV-G	Traditional
Courage the Cowardly Dog	Horror comedy	4 seasons, 52 episodes	John R. Dilworth	November 12, 1999 – November 22, 2002	Cartoon Network	Stretch Films; Hanna-Barbera (pilot)	TV-Y7	Traditional
NASCAR Racers	Action	2 seasons, 26 episodes		November 20, 1999 – March 24, 2001	Fox Kids	Saerom Animation; Saban Entertainment	TV-Y7	Traditional
Little Bill	Educational	4 seasons, 52 episodes	Bill Cosby	November 28, 1999 – February 6, 2004	Nick Jr. Channel	Nickelodeon Animation Studio	TV-Y	Flash
Totally Tooned In	Anthology	1 season, 65 episodes	Rob Word	December 4, 1999 – May 2, 2000	Syndication	Associated Studios	—N/a	Traditional

=== United Kingdom ===
Title	Genre	Seasons/episodes	Show creator(s)	Original release	Network	Studio	Technique
Joshua Jones	Children's television series	1 season, 12 episodes	Rob Lee	17 September – 3 December 1991	S4C	Bumper Films; Grand Slamm Children's Films	Stop motion
Kipper	Children's television series	6 seasons, 78 episodes	Mick Inkpen	5 September 1997 – 21 December 2000	ITV	Grand Slamm Children's Films; HIT Entertainment	Traditional
Bob the Builder (1999)	Children's animation	19 series, 250 episodes	Keith Chapman	Original series: 12 April 1999 – 28 September 2004	CBBC (1998–2001); CBeebies (2002–04)	HIT Entertainment	Stop-motion
Project: Build It	Children's animation	19 series, 250 episodes	Keith Chapman	2 May 2005 – 26 August 2008	CBeebies	HIT Entertainment	Stop-motion
Ready, Steady, Build!	Children's animation	19 series, 250 episodes	Keith Chapman	12 April 2010 – 31 December 2011	CBeebies	HIT Entertainment	CGI
Maisy	Children's; Traditional; Animated	1 season, 26 episodes	Lucy Cousins	11 February 1999 – 2 November 2000	CITV	King Rollo Films; PolyGram Visual Programming; Universal Pictures Visual Programming	
The Big Knights	Children's	1 season, 13 episodes	Mark Baker; Neville Astley	19 December 1999 – 3 January 2000	BBC Two	The Big Knights Ltd.	Flash

=== Canada ===
Title	Genre	Seasons/episodes	Show creator(s)	Original release	Network	Studio	Technique
ReBoot	Science fiction; Action–adventure	4 seasons, 48 episodes	Gavin Blair; Ian Pearson; Phil Mitchell; John Grace	September 7, 1994 – November 30, 2001	YTV	Mainframe Entertainment; Alliance Communications (seasons 1–3); Shaw Communications (season 3); Alliance Atlantis (season 4)	CGI
Stickin' Around	Slapstick; Comedy	3 seasons, 39 episodes	Robin Steele; Brianne Leary	August 14, 1996 – April 13, 1998	YTV	Nelvana	Traditional (seasons 1 and 3); Flash (season 2)

=== Co-productions ===
==== European ====
Title	Genre	Seasons/episodes	Show creator(s)	Original release	Network	Studio	Technique
Star Street: The Adventures of the Star Kids	Science-fiction			1991	Veronica (Dutch-American co-production)		
Hammerman		1 season, 13 episodes	• Andy Heyward •MC Hammer	September 7, 1991 – 1992	ABC	• DIC Animation City • Bustin' Productions, Inc. • Reteitalia	Traditional
ProStars		1 season, 13 episodes	• Andy Heyward • Douglas Booth	September 14, 1991 – December 7, 1991	NBC	• DIC Animation City • Reteitalia	Traditional
Super Mario World	• Adventure • Fantasy	13 episodes	Shigeru Miyamoto (original characters)	September 14, 1991 – December 7, 1991	• NBC (United States) • Italia 1 (Italy) • Telecinco (Spain)	• DIC Animation City • Reteitalia, S.p.A. • Nintendo of America Inc.	Traditional
Wish Kid	•Comedy • Fantasy	1 season, 13 episodes		September 14, 1991 – December 7, 1991	NBC	• DIC Animation City • Reteitalia	Traditional
Where's Wally?		13 episodes	Martin Handford	September 14, 1991 – December 14, 1991	CBS	• Sei Young Animation Co., Ltd. • The Waldo Film Company • DIC Enterprises • HIT Communications PLC	Traditional
Adventures of Sonic the Hedgehog	• Adventure • Comedy	1 season, 65 episodes	Kent Butterworth	• Original series: September 6 – December 3, 1993 • Christmas special: November 24, 1996	Broadcast syndication	• DIC Animation City • Sega of America • Bohbot Entertainment • Reteitalia, S.p.A.	Traditional
Madeline	Musical	3 seasons, 59 episodes	Stan Phillips	September 12, 1993 – March 1, 2001	• HBO (pilot) • The Family Channel (remaining 5 specials and Season 1) • ABC (season 2) • Disney Channel (Playhouse Disney, season 3)	• DIC Entertainment, L.P. • France Animation (specials 2–6) • Cinar (specials 2–6)	Traditional
All-New Dennis the Menace		13 episodes	•Sean Roche • Robert Shellhorn	September 18, 1993 – December 11, 1993	CBS	• DIC Productions L.P. • Reteitalia • Saerom Animation	Traditional
Sonic the Hedgehog	• Action • Science fantasy	2 seasons, 26 episodes	• Dick Sebast (season 1) • Ron Myrick (season 2)	September 18, 1993 – December 3, 1994	ABC	• DIC Productions, L.P. • Sega of America • Reteitalia • Milimetros • Saerom Animation	Traditional
The Wacky World of Tex Avery	• Comedy • Slapstick	1 season, 65 episodes	• Daniël Shwall • Christian Choquet • Paul F. Quinn • Marsha Goodman • Lisa Schaffer	September 3 – November 30, 1997	• M6 • First-run syndication	• DIC Productions, L.P. • Les Studios Tex SARL • Telcima S.A. • Milimetros S.A.	Traditional
Godzilla: The Series	• Kaiju • Science fiction • Action	2 seasons, 40 episodes		September 12, 1998 – April 22, 2000	Fox Kids	• Centropolis Television • Les Studios Tex SARL • Toho Co., Ltd • Adelaide Productions • Columbia TriStar Television	Traditional

==== Canadian ====
Title	Genre	Seasons/episodes	Show creator(s)	Original release	Network	Studio	Technique
Little Rosey		13 episodes	Roseanne Barr	September 8, 1990 – December 22, 1990	ABC	Little Rosey Productions, Inc.; Nelvana	Traditional
Bill & Ted's Excellent Adventures	Fantasy; Sci fi; Comedy; Adventure	2 seasons, 21 episodes	Peter Hannan	September 15, 1990 – November 16, 1991	CBS (season 1); Fox (Fox Kids, season 2)	Hanna-Barbera Productions (season 1); DIC Enterprises (season 2); Orion Television Entertainment; Nelson Entertainment	Traditional
A Bunch of Munsch	Anthology	7 episodes	Micheline Charest	December 7, 1991 – December 2, 1992	CTV (Canada); Showtime (United States)	CINAR Films; Animation Services (Hong Kong), Ltd.	Traditional
Fievel's American Tails		1 season, 13 episodes	David Kirschner	September 12, 1992 – December 5, 1992	CBS	Amblin Television; Amblimation; Nelvana; Universal Cartoon Studios	Traditional
Cadillacs and Dinosaurs	Adventure; Science fantasy	1 season, 13 episodes	Steven E. de Souza; Mark Schultz	September 18, 1993 – January 28, 1994	CBS	Nelvana; Galaxy Films; de Souza Productions	Traditional
Tales from the Cryptkeeper	Horror; Science fiction	3 seasons, 39 episodes	Libby Hinson; Ben Joseph	September 18, 1993 – December 4, 1999	Canada: YTV, Teletoon; United States: ABC, CBS; France: Canal+, M6	EC Comics; Nelvana; Fantome Animation (season 3)	Traditional
The Magic School Bus	Edutainment; Adventure; Comedy; Science fantasy	4 seasons, 52 episodes	Alison Blank; Kristin Laskas Martin; Jane Startz	September 10, 1994 – December 6, 1997	PBS	South Carolina ETV; Nelvana; Scholastic Entertainment	Traditional
The Baby Huey Show	Comedy	2 seasons, 26 episodes	Bob Jaques	September 17, 1994 – December 9, 1995	First-run syndication	Carbunkle Cartoons; Universal/Harvey Animation Studios; The Harvey Entertainment Company	Traditional
Free Willy		2 seasons, 21 episodes	Gary Hurst	September 24, 1994 – February 25, 1995	ABC; Global Television Network	Nelvana; Regency Enterprises; Le Studio Canal; Warner Bros. Television	Traditional
Wild C.A.T.s		1 season, 13 episodes	Jim Lee; Brandon Choi	October 1, 1994 – January 21, 1995	CBS	WildStorm Productions; Nelvana	Traditional
Little Bear	Preschool animation; Adventure; Fantasy; Comedy; Drama; Action; Family; History	5 seasons, 65 episodes	Else Holmelund Minarik; Maurice Sendak; Jeff Goode	November 6, 1995 – June 1, 2001	Canadian Broadcasting Corporation (Canada); Nick Jr. (United States)	John B. Carls Productions Inc.; Wild Things Productions; Nelvana; Hong Guang Animation (2000–01, season 5)	Traditional
Ace Ventura: Pet Detective	Comedy	3 seasons, 41 episodes	Duane Capizzi	December 9, 1995 – February 4, 2000	CBS (1995–97); Nickelodeon (1999–2000)	Morgan Creek Productions; Nelvana Limited (1995–1997, seasons 1–2); Odyssey Entertainment (1999–2000, season 3)	Traditional
Arthur	Comedy drama; Slice of life; Problem solving; Edutainment	24 seasons, 253 episodes	Marc Brown	October 7, 1996 – February 21, 2022	PBS (United States); TVOntario (Canada)	CINAR (seasons 1–9)/Cookie Jar Entertainment (seasons 9–15); Marc Brown Studios (seasons 5–25); Animation Services (Hong Kong), Ltd. (seasons 12–15); 9 Story Media Group (seasons 16–19)/Oasis Animation (season 20-25); WGBH Boston	Traditional (Digital ink-and-paint) (seasons 1–15); Flash (seasons 16–19); Toon Boom (seasons 20–25) Toon Boom Harmony (seasons 20–25); Cutout (seasons 20–25)
Caillou (1997)		5 seasons, 92 episodes	Hélène Desputeaux; Christine L'Heureux	September 15, 1997 – 2011	Télétoon (seasons 1–4, French); Teletoon (seasons 1–4, English); Treehouse TV (season 5, English); TFO (season 5, French)	CINAR (seasons 1–3); Shanghai Animation Film Studio (season 3); Animation Services (Hong Kong), Ltd. (season 3); 9 Story Entertainment (season 4); Nelvana (season 4); Sardine Productions (season 5); Optix Entertainment (season 5); Clockwork Zoo (season 5)	Traditional (Digital ink-and-paint) (seasons 1–3); Flash (seasons 4–5); Toon Boom (season 5); Toon Boom Harmony (season 5); Cutout (season 5)
The Adventures of Sam & Max: Freelance Police		1 season, 13 episodes, 24 segments	Steve Purcell	October 3, 1997 – April 25, 1998	Fox Kids (United States); YTV (Canada)	Nelvana	Traditional
Franklin		6 seasons, 78 episodes		November 3, 1997 – August 8, 2004	Canada: Family Channel (Seasons 1–5); Treehouse TV (Season 6); France: TF1	Nelvana; Neurones France (Seasons 1–4); Neurones Luxembourg (Seasons 1–4); Neuroplanet (Season 5); LuxAnimation (Season 6); Alphanim (Season 6)	Traditional
Flying Rhino Junior High		2 seasons, 26 episodes	Ray Nelson Jr.	October 3, 1998 – January 22, 2000	CBS (United States); Teletoon (Canada); TF1 (France)	Big Daddy Productions; Flying Rhinoceros, Inc. Neurones Animation; Scottish Television Enterprises; Nelvana Limited; CBS Productions	Traditional
Anatole	Children's television Adventures	1 season, 26 episodes		October 3, 1998 – June 28, 1999	CBS	Valentine Productions s.a.r.l. Nelvana; Scottish Television Enterprises	Traditional
Dumb Bunnies		26 episodes		October 3, 1998 – September 26, 1999		Home Box Office; Seven Network; Cartoon Network; Scholastic; Nelvana; Yoram Gross-Village Roadshow	Traditional
Birdz	Comedy	1 season, 13 episodes	Larry Jacobs	October 3, 1998 – January 2, 1999	CBS (United States)	Nelvana	Traditional
Rolie Polie Olie		6 seasons, 75 episodes	William Joyce	October 4, 1998 - April 28, 2004	Playhouse Disney (United States); CBC Television (Canada); La Cinquième/France 5 (France); Milkshake! (United Kingdom)	Nelvana; Métal Hurlant Productions (seasons 1–5); Sparx* (seasons 1–5); Sparkling Animation (season 6)	CGI
Mythic Warriors		2 seasons, 26 episodes		November 7, 1998 – 2000	CBS (United States)	Nelvana; Marathon Media	Traditional
Ed, Edd n Eddy	Comedy	6 seasons, 70 episodes	Danny Antonucci	January 4, 1999 – November 8, 2009	Cartoon Network	a.k.a. Cartoon	Traditional
Rescue Heroes	Action	3 seasons, 39 episodes	Fisher-Price	October 2, 1999 – December 18, 2002	Teletoon	Nelvana	Traditional
Zoboomafoo	Comedy	2 seasons, 65 episodes	Chris Kratt; Martin Kratt; Leo Eaton	January 25, 1999 – June 7, 2001	PBS Kids	Earth Creatures; Maryland Public Television; CINAR Corporation	Live-action; Stop-motion
Dragon Tales	Fantasy	3 seasons, 95 episodes	Ron Rodecker; Jim Coane	September 6, 1999 – April 11, 2005	PBS Kids (United States); CBC Television (Canada)	Adelaide Productions (uncredited); Children's Television Workshop (season 1) (1999–2000); Sesame Workshop (seasons 2–3) (2001–05); Columbia TriStar Television (seasons 1–2) (1999–2002); Sony Pictures Television (season 3) (2005)	Traditional (Cel (season 1)/Digital ink-and-paint (seasons 2-3))
Weird-Ohs	Comedy	1 season, 13 episodes	Bill Campbell	September 15, 1999 – March 15, 2009	YTV	Decode Entertainment; EM.TV & Merchandising AG; Mainframe Entertainment; Testors Corporation	CGI

== See also ==
- List of children's animated films
