= Adelaide Productions =

Animation studio

- Type: Division
- Industry: Animation
- Founded: April 12, 1993; 33 years ago
- Fate: Dormancy
- Successors: Studio: Sony Pictures Television Kids; Library: Sony Pictures Television
- Headquarters: 10202 West Washington Boulevard, Culver City, California, U.S.
- Products: Animated television series
- Parent: Columbia Pictures Television (1993–1994); Columbia TriStar Television (1994–2002); Sony Pictures Television (2002–present)

Adelaide Productions (also referred to as Columbia TriStar Television Animation and Sony Pictures Television Animation) is a copyright holding unit of Sony Pictures Television that was founded on April 12, 1993 and produces animated series.

== Filmography ==
=== TV series ===
Years	Title	Creator(s) / Developer(s)	Network	Co-production with	Notes
1996–1999	Jumanji	—N/a	UPN Kids (1996–1998); BKN (1998–1999)	Interscope Communications; Teitler Film	Based on the 1995 film by TriStar Pictures and the book by Chris Van Allsburg.
1996	Project G.e.e.K.e.R.	Doug TenNapel; Doug Langdale	CBS	Doug²	
1997	Extreme Ghostbusters	Jeff Kline; Richard Raynis	BKN	—N/a	Based on the films by Columbia Pictures. Sequel to The Real Ghostbusters.
1997–2001	Men in Black: The Series	Duane Capizzi; Jeff Kline; Richard Raynis	Kids' WB	Amblin Entertainment	Based on the 1997 film by Columbia Pictures and the Malibu comic by Lowell Cunningham.
1997–1998	Channel Umptee-3	Jim George; Norman Lear; John Baskin	Kids' WB	Act III Productions; Enchanté George	
1998–2000	Godzilla: The Series	Jeff Kline; Richard Raynis	Fox Kids	Toho; Centropolis Television	Based on the 1998 film by TriStar Pictures and the character by Toho.
1999–2000	Dilbert	Scott Adams; Larry Charles	UPN	Idbox; United Media	Animation production; based on the comic strip by Scott Adams.
1999–2000	Roughnecks: Starship Troopers Chronicles	Richard Raynis; Duane Capizzi; Jeff Kline	BKN	Verhoeven-Marshall	Based on the 1997 film by TriStar Pictures and the novel Starship Troopers by Robert A. Heinlein; also known as Starship Troopers: The Series.
1999–2005	Dragon Tales	Ron Rodecker; Jim Coane; Wesley Eure; Jeffrey Scott; Cliff Ruby; Elana Lesser	PBS Kids	Sesame Workshop	Uncredited.
1999–2001	Big Guy and Rusty the Boy Robot	Richard Raynis; Duane Capizzi; Jeff Kline	Fox Kids	Dark Horse Entertainment	Based on the comic book by Frank Miller and Geoff Darrow.
2000–2002	Max Steel	Greg Weisman; Jeff Kline	Kids' WB (2000–2001); Cartoon Network (2001–2002)	Mainframe Entertainment (season 3)	Based on the toyline by Mattel.
2000	Sammy	David Spade; Drake Sather	NBC	Desert Rat Productions; Brad Grey Television; NBC Studios	Animation production.
2000–2005	Jackie Chan Adventures	John Rogers; Duane Capizzi; Jeff Kline	Kids' WB	The JC Group; Blue Train Entertainment	
2001–2002	Heavy Gear: The Animated Series	Mark Seidenberg; Mark Hoffmeier; Richard Raynis	Syndication	Mainframe Entertainment; Dream Pod 9; Paradox Entertainment	Based on the video game by Pierre Ouelled and Dream Pod 9 licensed by Paradox Entertainment.
2001–2002	Harold and the Purple Crayon	Carin Greenberg Baker; Jeff Kline	HBO Family	—N/a	Based on the book by Crockett Johnson.
2002	Phantom Investigators	Stephen Holman; Josephine T. Huang	Kids' WB	(W)Holesome Products, Inc.	Uncredited.
2003	Stuart Little	—N/a	HBO Family	Red Wagon Entertainment	Based on the films by Columbia Pictures and the characters by E. B. White.
2003	Spider-Man: The New Animated Series	Brian Michael Bendis; Morgan Gendel; Marsha Griffin	MTV	Mainframe Entertainment; Marvel Enterprises	Based on the character by Stan Lee and Steve Ditko.
2003–2004	Astro Boy	Osamu Tezuka	Kids' WB; Cartoon Network	Sony Pictures Entertainment Japan; Tezuka Productions; Dentsu	U.S. production; based on the manga by Osamu Tezuka.
2005–2014	The Boondocks	Aaron McGruder	Adult Swim	Rebel Base Productions (seasons 1–3)	Based on the comic strip by Aaron McGruder.
2008–2009	The Spectacular Spider-Man	Stan Lee; Steve Ditko; Victor Cook; Greg Weisman	Kids' WB! (season 1, episodes 1–9); The CW4Kids (season 1, episodes 10–13); Disney XD (season 2)	Marvel Entertainment; Culver Entertainment	Based on the character by Stan Lee and Steve Ditko.
2009	Sit Down, Shut Up	Mitchell Hurwitz	Fox	Tantamount Studios; ITV Studios; 20th Century Fox Television	Based on the original Australian 2001 series of the same name by Brendan Reed and Tim McLoughlan.
2022	The Boys Presents: Diabolical	Eric Kripke; Simon Racioppa; Seth Rogen; Evan Goldberg	Amazon Prime Video	Titmouse; Kripke Enterprises; Original Film; Point Grey Pictures; Amazon Studios	Uncredited; based on the comic book by Garth Ennis and Darick Robertson.

=== Web series ===
Years	Title	Creator/ Developer(s)	Network	Co-production with	Notes
2002	Lenore, the Cute Little Dead Girl	Roman Dirge	ScreenBlast	Sony Pictures Digital Entertainment	Based on the comics by Roman Dirge and the poem by Edgar Allan Poe.

== See also ==
- Sony Pictures Animation
- Sony Pictures Television Kids
- Screen Gems (1921–1946)
- List of animation studios owned by Sony
