= List of Dragon Tales episodes =

The following is a list of episodes from the 1999 animated TV series, Dragon Tales, which ran from September 6, 1999, to April 11, 2005.

== Series overview ==
Season	Segments	Episodes	Originally released	
Season	Segments	Episodes	First released	Last released
1	80	40	September 6, 1999	April 28, 2000
2	48	24	June 4, 2001	October 8, 2002
3	60	30	February 21, 2005	April 11, 2005

== Episodes ==
Dragon Tales consists of 94 episodes, 40 in the first, 24 in the second, and 30 in the third season. Many of the third season's episodes are merely repeats from the second season, with only 13 original episodes produced for the third season. There are 78 original episodes total. There was also a special one-off episode called "Let's Start a Band!" which aired in 2003. Season 1 uses cel animation while seasons 2 and 3 use digital ink and paint.

=== Season 1 (1999–2000) ===
No. overall	No. in season	Title	Written by	Storyboard by	Original release date
1	1	"To Fly with Dragons"	Cliff Ruby & Elana Lesser	Ron Campbell	September 6, 1999
1	1	"The Forest of Darkness"	Cliff Ruby & Elana Lesser	Ron Campbell	September 6, 1999
To Fly with Dragons: After moving to a new house, a 6-year old girl named Emmy and her younger 4-year old brother named Max find a magical dragon scale that takes them to Dragon Land, a magical place where they meet their new magical dragon friends, Cassie, Ord, Zak and Wheezie the 2-headed dragon, and Quetzal the teacher at their School in the Sky. The Forest of Darkness: When Ord becomes afraid of the dark, his friends show him that even a little light takes the darkness away and that there is nothing to fear after all. Song: "The Hello Song"
2	2	"To Kingdom Come"	Bob Carrau	Art Mawhinney & Wendell Washer	September 7, 1999
2	2	"Goodbye, Little Caterpoozle"	Jeffrey Scott	Art Mawhinney & Wendell Washer	September 7, 1999
To Kingdom Come: Ord's selfishness by refusing to share anything with his friends at a beach party, especially a "wishing shell" he finds, sends him and then everyone else to a strange and unfamiliar land called "Kingdom Come" with no way home, since the owner, Mounsieur Marmadune, also refuses to share the key with them to let them out. However, Ord later learns that sharing with friends can make any wish come true. Goodbye, Little Caterpoozle: Cassie has a new pet Caterpoozle called Poozie. When Cassie finds Poozie wrapped in some white stuff, everybody thinks she died. However, it is later discovered that Poozie changed into a Butterfairy. Song: "Shake Your Dragon Tail"
3	3	"Knot a Problem"	Jeffrey Scott	Art Mawhinney & Wendell Washer	September 8, 1999
3	3	"Ord's Unhappy Birthday"	Jeffrey Scott	Art Mawhinney & Wendell Washer	September 8, 1999
Knot a Problem: Max becomes clumsy when it comes on learning how to tie knots and has lots of trouble on learning how to tie one. But when Whinny, the carousel pony, is missing and the dragons rescue her, Max discovers that knots are not a big problem after all. Ord's Unhappy Birthday: It's Ord's birthday, but his friends don't have time to play with him. Feeling sad, Ord seeks out Quetzal who tells him to share his feelings with his friends. Afterwards, everybody gives him the best birthday ever, and little did he know that his friends were planning to make a surprise party for him. Song: "And the World Goes Round and Round"
4	4	"Tails You Lose"	Robert Schechter & Alicia Marie Schudt	Art Mawhinney & Keith Sargent	September 9, 1999
4	4	"Calling Dr. Zak"	Jeffrey Scott	Art Mawhinney & Keith Sargent	September 9, 1999
Tails You Lose: Emmy dislikes losing, and while everyone plays freeze dance, she is always the first one to be eliminated from the game by being called out. Emmy decides to quit the game and heads home early, but Quetzal shows her that playing can be much more fun than winning. Calling Dr. Zak: During practice for the Dragon Land talent show, Zak gets a thorn stuck in his foot after accidentally stepping on a Spiny-Pine and has to go to Dr. Booboogone, but he's very worried about going to the doctor and is frightened as he thinks it will hurt. However, Dr. Booboogone shows that doctors are only there to help. Song: "Hum"
5	5	"Pigment of Your Imagination"	Jeffrey Scott	Ernie Guanlao & Art Mawhinney	September 10, 1999
5	5	"Zak's Song"	Scott Guy	Ernie Guanlao & Art Mawhinney	September 10, 1999
Pigment of Your Imagination: The group runs out of paint as they are finishing their I-Love-My-Mommy Day gifts. They set off for Rainbow Canyon to find more colors. However, when their map breaks, they must work as a team to put the pieces back together. Zak's Song: Melodious Do-Re-Mi birds flee in fright when the dragons and kids loudly join their early morning concert. Confident Zak knows that his gentle song will bring them back, but everyone else keeps ignoring him and scaring them away with their loud noises. Song: "The Hello Song"
6	6	"Snow Dragons"	Laurie Bauman Arnold	Eric McConnell & Tom Nesbitt	September 20, 1999
6	6	"The Fury is Out on This One"	Bob Carrau	Eric McConnell & Tom Nesbitt	September 20, 1999
Snow Dragons: Quetzal tells Max and Ord to meet him at the Snow Dragon in the Stickleback Mountains, but they get lost in the snow on the way. The Fury is Out on This One: Max gets quite frustrated after losing Dragon Tag and throws a pod whipping it at a tree where it breaks in half, releasing a Fury, a little creature who grows bigger when someone gets angry. To stop him from getting even bigger, Emmy and the dragons help Max control his anger. Song: "Shake Your Dragon Tail"
7	7	"The Giant of Nod"	Cliff Ruby & Elana Lesser	Art Mawhinney	September 21, 1999
7	7	"The Big Sleepover"	Bob Carrau	Eric McConnell	September 21, 1999
The Giant of Nod: Zak and Wheezie practice for tonight's concert hosted by Quetzal at Singing Springs, but they war over various songs they wanted to play and disturb the nap of a twelve-inch creature known eponymously as "The Giant of Nod". He desperately throws them in a tree trunk, so it's up to them to save the gang so they can make it to the concert. The Big Sleepover: Zak and Wheezie are having a sleepover, but Cassie is too homesick to go. Bringing something familiar from home helps, especially when she finds out how much fun sleepovers really are. Song: "And the World Goes Round and Round"
8	8	"A Picture's Worth a Thousand Words"	Jeffrey Scott	Tim Eldred	September 22, 1999
8	8	"The Talent Pool"	Cliff Ruby & Elana Lesser	Tim Eldred	September 22, 1999
A Picture's Worth a Thousand Words: Ord wants to give his mother a very special birthday gift, so the Doodle Fairy draws a map to a meadow full of Giggle Flowers. The Talent Pool: Cassie notices that all her friends have special talents except her and feels left out, so she goes to the Talent Pool to find a talent. However, the Pool turns out to be very grumpy and refuses to give Cassie a talent. Song: "Hum"
9	9	"Emmy's Dream House"	Jeffrey Scott	Art Mawhinney & Roy Wilson	September 23, 1999
9	9	"Dragon Sails"	Alicia Marie Schudt & Robert Schechter	Art Mawhinney & Roy Wilson	September 23, 1999
Emmy's Dream House: A Purple Goo Cloud is going to rain all over Dragon Land, so everyone builds a tree house to shelter. However, Emmy becomes bossy and wants everything to be done her own way, until she learns how to share with her friends and give them what they want. Dragon Sails: The friends embark on full sail to Rainbow Canyon, but Ord is too big for the boat and feels bad until he saves his friends from going out of a dangerous cave and over a waterfall. Song: "The Hello Song"
10	10	"Eggs Over Easy"	Cliff Ruby & Elana Lesser	Art Mawhinney & Roy Wilson	September 24, 1999
10	10	"A Liking to Biking"	Lane Raichert	Art Mawhinney & Roy Wilson	September 24, 1999
Eggs Over Easy: Cyrus, a Slinky Serpent, steals a Rhyme Bird egg while the gang plays a game of baseball, and Cassie feels let down that she did not speak up when needed. A Liking to Biking: Ord finds riding a bike for the first time is too hard and quits. Luckily, his friends lend a helping hand and Ord tries over and over again until he succeeds. Song: "Shake Your Dragon Tail"
11	11	"Sky Pirates"	Jeffrey Scott	Sue Bielenberg & David Lanphear & Jason So	October 4, 1999
11	11	"Four Little Pigs"	Lane Raichert	Sue Bielenberg & David Lanphear & Jason So	October 4, 1999
Sky Pirates: The friends help an air pirate, Captain Scallywag, find buried treasure. Four Little Pigs: The kids and dragons want to do a "Three Little Pigs" puppet show, but Zak, Wheezie, and Emmy argue over wanting to be the Big Bad Wolf at the same time, until Emmy decides to add a fourth pig to the story while she lets Zak and Wheezie play the wolf. Song: "The Wiggle Song"
12	12	"Zak and the Beanstalk"	Jeffrey Scott	Sue Bielenberg & David Lanphear & Jason So	October 5, 1999
12	12	"A Feat on Her Feet"	Scott Guy	Sue Bielenberg & David Lanphear & Jason So	October 5, 1999
Zak and the Beanstalk: The Do-Re-Mi birds (from "Zak's Song") have been kidnapped, and it is up to Emmy, Max, Zak & Wheezie to come to their rescue. When they learn that a giant named Mungus took the birds because he loves their songs, they teach him how to make his own music to let the Do-Re-Mi birds out. A Feat on Her Feet: Cassie doesn't know how to roller skate and she needs to get her Jingle Flowers to Singing Springs on time. Luckily, her friends lend a helping hand and Cassie tries over and over again until she succeeds. Song: "And the World Goes Round and Round"
13	13	"Not Separated at Birth"	Laurie Bauman Arnold	Stan Gadziola & Brett Varon	October 6, 1999
13	13	"A Kite for Quetzal"	Mark Hoffmeier	Stan Gadziola & Brett Varon	October 6, 1999
Not Separated at Birth: Zak and Wheezie have had enough of always having to do what the other wants to do and wish they became separated from each other, so Quetzal gives them crystals that separates them. However, when they build a musical playground, they discover that they actually need each other more than previously thought. A Kite for Quetzal: Quetzal is sick and cannot help the gang make their kites, so the gang decides to surprise him by making their own kites. Song: "The Wiggle Song"
14	14	"Dragon Drop"	James Greenberg	Moon Choi & Suraiya Daud	October 7, 1999
14	14	"Cassie Loves a Parade"	Bob Carrau	Moon Choi & Suraiya Daud	October 7, 1999
Dragon Drop: The Dragon Fair has come to town and Zak and Wheezie are in the Sackberry Toss, but their biggest challenge is catching it. Luckily, Emmy helps them get better at their catching by practicing with a ball. Cassie Loves a Parade: Cassie is excited about the School-in-the-Sky Parade, but she gets very upset and feels left out when her name is not picked and realizes she cannot ride on the Book Float. She feels sorry for herself until she meets Cosmo, a flower who also got rejected from the parade. Song: "The Hello Song"
15	15	"A Cool School"	Cliff Ruby & Elana Lesser	Eric McConnell	October 8, 1999
15	15	"Max's Comic Adventure"	Jeffrey Scott	Eric McConnell	October 8, 1999
A Cool School: Max is nervous about his first day of school until Emmy takes him to the School in the Sky where Quetzal advises them, "When you're stuck, don't give up! Try something new". Max's Comic Adventure: The kids and dragons go on a quest to save Max's favorite comic book superhero, Mondo Mouse, from the Catnapper, using his "Mondo Mouse" comic book and 3D glasses. Song: "The Wiggle Song"
16	16	"It Happened One Nightmare"	Jeffrey Scott	Curt Walstead & Tim Eldred	October 18, 1999
16	16	"Staying within the Lines"	Jeffrey Scott	Curt Walstead & Tim Eldred	October 18, 1999
It Happened One Nightmare: The carnival has come to Dragon Land but the dragons are sleepy and cannot be very active since Ord has invited them for a sleepover at his house and he has a terrible nightmare which gives him trouble with his sleeping, causing everyone else to stay awake all night. Staying within the Lines: Quetzal and the dragons ask Max and Emmy to help them recolor a black-and-white Dragon Land when all color was washed out by a tremendous storm. However, Max thinks coloring properly within the lines is much more difficult than he expects. Song: "Hum"
17	17	"Follow the Dots"	Jeffrey Scott	Dave Arnett & Art Mawhinney	October 19, 1999
17	17	"A Smashing Success"	Jeffrey Scott	Dave Arnett & Art Mawhinney	October 19, 1999
Follow the Dots: Ord is afraid that he lost his father's favorite Whack-It-Back Whistler forever, until Norm the Number Gnome knows where it is and shows everyone how counting to ten will help them find it. A Smashing Success: A concert is coming up in Singing Springs, but Emmy accidentally breaks Wheezie's trumpet and is too afraid to tell what she did. Wheezie does blame Zak and later Cassie for breaking it though, making them feel bad. Song: "Shake Your Dragon Tail"
18	18	"Quibbling Siblings"	James Greenberg	Kevin Davis & Art Mawhinney	October 20, 1999
18	18	"Wheezie's Hairball"	Scott Guy	Kevin Davis & Art Mawhinney	October 20, 1999
Quibbling Siblings: Zak wants the rare Jugglebug for show and tell, but Wheezie is so noisy, she scares it away. With Max and Emmy's help the dragons find that working together gets the job done. Wheezie's Hairball: Wheezie gets a new pet Hairball named Slurpy and learns how to take care of him. However, after getting carried away with too many dragon berries swallowed whole, Slurpy ends up with a bad stomachache. Luckily, Quetzal advises them that hairballs like their dragon berries mashed. Song: "And the World Goes Round and Round"
19	19	"A Tall Tale"	Rick Gitelson	Moon Choi & Scott Jorgensen	October 21, 1999
19	19	"Stormy Weather"	Cliff Ruby & Elana Lesser	Moon Choi & Scott Jorgensen	October 21, 1999
A Tall Tale: Max is tired of being too short for almost everything and wishes he could be taller. So, when a pretty unicorn named Eunice loses her glasses, he discovers that being short may actually be useful for some many certain things after all. Stormy Weather: The kids and dragons visit the playground at the Cloud Island while Ord's mother prepares a spring party. But when Ord suddenly hears thunder, he gets as scared as he can be and runs into a cave. The others help him brave the storm with fun games. Song: "Hum"
20	20	"Blowin' in the Wind"	Laurie Bauman Arnold	Ron Campbell & Gary Goldstein & Tom Nesbitt	October 22, 1999
20	20	"No Hitter"	Jeffrey Scott	Ron Campbell & Gary Goldstein & Tom Nesbitt	October 22, 1999
Blowin' in the Wind: Max, Emmy, and their dragon friends help a wind blower called Windy learn to whistle so she can blow away the clouds, just like her father, the Big Whistling Wind. No Hitter: Max's anger is out of control when he punches Emmy's arm and later kicks Ord's tail during a game of Dragon Ball when things don't go his way. Quetzal teaches him to redirect his fury, first by not hitting others, next using words, then action, to let it out. Song: "The Wiggle Song"
21	21	"Do Not Pass Gnome"	Jeffrey Scott	Moon Choi & Bob Richardson	January 17, 2000
21	21	"Treasure Hunt"	Cliff Ruby & Elana Lesser	Moon Choi & Bob Richardson	January 17, 2000
Do Not Pass Gnome: Max accidentally breaks Emmy's yo-yo because he never listens to others when he's told to the first time. In Dragon Land, there is a game that can only be won by listening. Max hears what Simon says and wins Emmy a fixed yo-yo. Treasure Hunt: The kids visit the secret Treasure Trove with their dragon friends but forget Quetzal's final instruction and end up lost. It is only by following directions and working together that they break free. Song: "Stretch"
22	22	"The Jumping Bean Express"	Bob Carrau	Dave Lanphear & Art Mawhinney & Mike Milo	January 18, 2000
22	22	"Get Offa My Cloud"	Lisa Medway	Dave Lanphear & Art Mawhinney & Mike Milo	January 18, 2000
The Jumping Bean Express: Quetzal asks Max, Emmy and the dragons to deliver a pair of Jumping Beans to his twin brother Fernando across the Stickleback Mountains, but the beans keep escaping. It's up to one of the friends to help get the beans back to their cage. Get Offa My Cloud: Cassie, Ord and Emmy plant a garden, but Max just causes trouble and messes everything up. When wonder water sends Max and a sunflower shooting to the sky, he now must find his own way to get back down with help from an elf named Squink. Song: "And the World Goes Round and Round"
23	23	"Backwards to Forwards"	Bob Carrau	Brett Varon & Stan Gadziola	January 19, 2000
23	23	"Sounds Like Trouble"	Jeffrey Scott	Brett Varon & Stan Gadziola	January 19, 2000
Backwards to Forwards: During a game of Leap-Dragon, Zak and Wheezie accidentally hit a rock, sending it to one of the Backwards-Forwards Signs, and causing the entire Dragon Land to go backwards. When the mix-up becomes frustrating after a while, the gang must find a way to turn things around for them to go forwards again. Sounds Like Trouble: Max and Ord make a goo ball and the friends play catch with it, but it goes on the loose and then rolls into a dark cave. However, Ord is still scared of the dark, so it's up to the rest of the gang to help Ord brave his fear of the dark once more to find it. Song: "Clap"
24	24	"The Greatest Show in Dragon Land"	Rick Gitelson	Ron Campbell & Art Mawhinney	January 20, 2000
24	24	"Prepare According to Instructions"	Libby Hinson	Ron Campbell & Art Mawhinney	January 20, 2000
The Greatest Show in Dragon Land: The friends are excited to go to a new theme park called Wonder World, but they have to go through many obstacles to get there, despite Zak and Wheezie's broken wing. However, when they finally reach Wonder World, everyone thinks this place isn't Wonder World at all, since they think the obstacle rides were much more fun than the rides there. Prepare According to Instructions: Quetzal sends the gang to see the Dancing Crystals perform at Crystal Cave. Emmy doesn't think they need to follow instructions and the whole gang gets lost. She soon comes to understand why it is good to think ahead. Song: "Stretch"
25	25	"Wheezie's Last Laugh"	Scott Guy	Gary Goldstein & Shawn Palmer	January 21, 2000
25	25	"Frog Prints"	Jeffrey Scott	Gary Goldstein & Shawn Palmer	January 21, 2000
Wheezie's Last Laugh: The kids and dragons encounter Mr. Pop, only to mistakenly steal Wheezie's laugh and switch all the sounds around. During a merry chase, they learn that everything has its own special sound. Frog Prints: Everyone goes on a boat ride through Dragoon Lagoon where Max makes friends with a Unifrog named Hoppy, who can say his name, despite Quetzal's objections that he can't take him home because he would feel homesick and miss his family. Song: "Clap"
26	26	"Crash Landings"	Cliff Ruby & Elana Lesser	Curtis Cim & Curt Walstead	January 24, 2000
26	26	"The Big Cake Mix-Up"	Jeffrey Scott	Curtis Cim & Curt Walstead	January 24, 2000
Crash Landings: Max and Emmy coach a relay race in Dragon Land, but Zak is very nervous because he thinks he and Wheezie might get injured during the event by flying fast. So they use as much protection as they can and manage to win the relay race. The Big Cake Mix-Up: The kids and dragons enter a baking contest, hoping to win a cookbook for Quetzal. They split up to find the ingredients, only to return with the same thing. While making the cake, Ord gets carried away with the dragon berries as they are part of the ingredients. Despite winning second prize and not being able to win the cookbook they were planning to give to Quetzal, everyone enjoys their delicious condiments. Song: "Stretch"
27	27	"Quetzal's Magic Pop-Up Book"	Jeffrey Scott	Kathleen Carr & Stephan Martiniere	January 25, 2000
27	27	"My Way or Snow Way"	Jeffrey Scott	Kathleen Carr & Stephan Martiniere	January 25, 2000
Quetzal's Magic Pop-Up Book: When the gang uses Quetzal's magic pop-up book to make up stories, they all talk at once, but nobody listens. They soon realize that by taking turns, everyone's story gets to be heard. My Way or Snow Way: The friends help a snowman called Chilly find his snow puppy, Nippy before he melts away in the warm weather. Song: "Clap"
28	28	"Sand Castle Hassle"	Mark Hoffmeier	Suraiya Daud & Eric Molina	January 26, 2000
28	28	"A True Blue Friend"	Jeffrey Scott	Suraiya Daud & Eric Molina	January 26, 2000
Sand Castle Hassle: The kids and dragons build sandcastles so the Turtle Dragons can lay their eggs, but the castles are too close to the water and get washed away. They cannot give up, so the only thing to do is try again. A True Blue Friend: The gang inadvertently uses permanent paint and turn themselves into different colors, after Ord mistakenly grabs the paints from the bottom shelf even though Zak reminds him to grab the ones from the top shelf. Afraid that the paint will never come off, they must follow Quetzal's instructions in order to remove the paint from their bodies. Song: "Pretend"
29	29	"Zak Takes a Dive"	Lisa Medway	Gerard Baldwin & Norman Quebedeau	January 27, 2000
29	29	"Under the Weather"	Bob Carrau	Gerard Baldwin & Norman Quebedeau	January 27, 2000
Zak Takes a Dive: Zak is very nervous about going swimming as he and Wheezie have never been swimming before, but he later realizes that trying new activities can end up being fun. Under the Weather: The gang must investigate why the weather in Dragon Land is behaving so oddly. Song: "Touch"
30	30	"My Emmy or Bust"	Jeffrey Scott	Moon Choi & Jason So	January 28, 2000
30	30	"Light My Firebreath"	Bob Carrau	Moon Choi & Jason So	January 28, 2000
My Emmy or Bust: Max is summoned to Dragon Land by himself for the first time while Emmy is at the store with their father. He accompanies the dragons on an underwater mission, only to discover a giant octopus who grabs them. Light My Firebreath: Dragon Land is having a fire fest and the gang is on practice, but Wheezie mistakenly drinks a Plump Gump Flower which puts out her fire breath, so Dr. Booboogone (from "Calling Dr. Zak") gives them instructions on how she can get it back. Song: "Zoo"
31	31	"Follow the Leader"	Cliff Ruby & Elana Lesser	Art Mawhinney & Eric McConnell	April 17, 2000
31	31	"Max and the Magic Carpet"	Bob Carrau	Art Mawhinney & Eric McConnell	April 17, 2000
Follow the Leader: While playing a game of "Following the Leader", Emmy becomes bossy and wants things to be done her own way, and later ends up being captured by Pooky, a giant little girl Troll from the Towering Village, as she thinks Emmy is a doll to play with. Max and the Magic Carpet: Ord plans a picnic at Rainbow Canyon and invites Emmy, Cassie, and Max. When Quetzal is doing some spring cleaning, Max is excited to find that his old magic carpet can still fly. He has so much fun riding on it but doesn't know he is ignoring Ord until he falls in a Huggly-Snuggly Flower and Ord squeezes him out. Max apologizes to Ord for ignoring him and to thank him and prove that they're still friends, they ride on the carpet together. Song: "Silly Song"
32	32	"Rope Trick"	Laurie Bauman Arnold	Ron Campbell & Art Mawhinney	April 18, 2000
32	32	"Baby Troubles"	Cliff Ruby & Elana Lesser	Ron Campbell & Art Mawhinney	April 18, 2000
Rope Trick: When Quetzal's magic potion spills Ord's jump rope after Zak and Wheezie lose their balance, it becomes alive. Zak and Wheezie want to jump rope, but don't know how. With Emmy's help, they learn that some things are harder than they look, but with determination, anything is possible. Baby Troubles: Kiki, Cassie's baby sister, refuses to take her nap and gets very upset when Ord accidentally flattens her squishy. So the gang works together, taking care of her. It's also up to Ord to help find a new squishy for Kiki to finally get her to take her nap. Song: "Betcha Can"
33	33	"Small Time"	Cliff Ruby & Elana Lesser	Stan Gadziola & Bob Richardson	April 19, 2000
33	33	"Roller Coaster Dragon"	Jeffrey Scott	Stan Gadziola & Bob Richardson	April 19, 2000
Small Time: Upon entering Dragon Land, Max and Emmy encounter Shrinking Violets, which shrink them down to ant size. Roller Coaster Dragon: Wheezie can't wait for her turn on the new Roller Coaster Dragon and soon loses her patience. So her friends try to help her do other things to take her mind off the ride with condiments and music. Song: "Pretend"
34	34	"Up, Up and Away"	Bob Carrau	Moon Choi & Norman Quebedeau	April 20, 2000
34	34	"Wild Time"	Libby Hinson	Moon Choi & Norman Quebedeau	April 20, 2000
Up, Up and Away: The gang has a great time playing Pop the Bubbles, until Ord's experiment goes wrong and he is trapped inside a humongous indestructible bubble! Ord cannot get out all by himself because the bubble's skin is too tough to pop, so his friends find a way to keep him from floating away. They must also find out a way to help Ord get out of the bubble. Wild Time: Max wants to goof off when he goes to Dragon Land, but he ends up ruining the dragons' craft projects for the Dragon Scale Festival, and everyone is angry at him. He later learns that there are times to be silly and other times to be serious. Song: "Touch"
35	35	"Bad Share Day"	Jeffrey Scott	Gary Goldstein & Art Mawhinney	April 21, 2000
35	35	"Whole Lotta Maracas Goin' On"	Bob Carrau	Gary Goldstein & Art Mawhinney	April 21, 2000
Bad Share Day: Cassie discovers a magic crayon. Everyone wants a turn to use it, but no one wants to share. Cassie is also reluctant in sharing it, since she has planned to make a special card for her sick mother. Whole Lotta Maracas Goin' On: Quetzal's maracas are broken and the gang decides to make him a new set. Now, they must work as a team to find all the materials they need – which turns out to be a challenging new adventure all its own. Song: "Zoo"
36	36	"Ord Sees the Light"	Jeffrey Scott	Ron Campbell & Gary Goldstein	April 24, 2000
36	36	"The Ugly Dragling"	Jeffrey Scott	Ron Campbell & Gary Goldstein	April 24, 2000
Ord Sees the Light: Max revisits Hoppy (from "Frog Prints"), who keeps hopping away into dark places, and Ord must brave his fear of the dark yet again to help find him. The Ugly Dragling: The gang meets a dragon named Priscilla who has huge feathers and is afraid everyone will laugh at her. Song: "Silly Song"
37	37	"Out with the Garbage"	Cliff Ruby & Elana Lesser	Gary Goldstein & David Lanphear & Shawn Palmer	April 25, 2000
37	37	"Lights, Camera, Dragons"	Lane Raichert	Gary Goldstein & David Lanphear & Shawn Palmer	April 25, 2000
Out with the Garbage: Zak thinks he is doing a good thing by cleaning Wheezie's side of the room. But he soon discovers that the "junk" he threw away was actually all of Wheezie's treasures, making Wheezie get very upset. Now, the gang has to help Wheezie get them back. Lights, Camera, Dragons: When Ord loses his pet mouse, Cheddar, Emmy decides to film "The Great Dragon Mouse Mystery" with her video camera. However, she causes some hard feelings when she declines Max's help and suggests that her cast of dragons work through a lunch break. Song: "Betcha Can"
38	38	"Bully for You"	Cliff Ruby & Elana Lesser	Scott Hill & Eric McConnell	April 26, 2000
38	38	"The Great White Cloud Whale"	Jeffrey Scott	Scott Hill & Eric McConnell	April 26, 2000
Bully for You: The School-in-the-Sky has a new student named Spike, who hurts Cassie's feelings by saying unfriendly things to her and then stealing her basket of sugarplums. Quetzal later helps Cassie find a kind way to deal with the school bully. The Great White Cloud Whale: The friends help Captain Scallywag (from "Sky Pirates") find a Great White Cloud Whale, who swallowed his ship. Song: "Pretend"
39	39	"To Do or Not to Do"	Bob Carrau	Stephan Martiniere & Art Mawhinney	April 27, 2000
39	39	"Much Ado About Nodlings"	Jeffrey Scott	Stephan Martiniere & Art Mawhinney	April 27, 2000
To Do or Not to Do: When Cassie's friends get trapped inside a huge Dragonrhinoceros, they try to tell her to do what they think to escape, but Cassie wants to try her own idea. Much Ado About Nodlings: Max accidentally breaks the Nodlings' wagon with his bulldozer and without it, they are in trouble, making the Giant of Nod furious. When everyone's attempts to fix it seem to fail, Max sticks it out, determined to correct his mistake. Song: "Silly Song"
40	40	"Don't Bug Me!"	Jeffrey Scott	Rob Busch & Suraiya Daud	April 28, 2000
40	40	"Over and Over"	Alicia Schudt & Robert Schechter	Rob Busch & Suraiya Daud	April 28, 2000
Don't Bug Me!: While hunting for a Flutterby, Max scares Ord with a toy spider, but Max loves bugs and can't understand how Ord could be afraid of them. Over and Over: Max is unable to swing on the monkey bars, and he wants to learn, but he just can't get any better at it and then refuses to try again. However, when Ord gets trapped in sap, it's up to Max to swing to the rescue. Song: "Betcha Can"

=== Season 2 (2001–2002) ===
No. overall	No. in season	Title	Written by	Storyboard by	Original release date
41	1	"Lucky Stone"	Nancy Neufeld Callaway	Christian Lignan & Steve Jones & Will Sweeney	June 4, 2001
41	1	"The Mefirst Wizard"	Jim Fisher & Jim Staahl	Christian Lignan & Steve Jones & Will Sweeney	June 4, 2001
Lucky Stone: Ord loses his lucky heart-shaped stone and explains that he needs it to do three loop-de-loops, four aerial zigzags, and a round springback handoff after Max confesses that he threw it in the river when he and Emmy were skipping rocks when they arrive in Dragon Land. However, when Ord does his tricks without it, he learns that he really didn't need the stone to be lucky at all. Just by believing in himself. The Mefirst Wizard: The friends race over who should go first on an obstacle course and unleash a selfish two-headed wizard who always goes first. They must recite a spell to send him back to his pond. Song: "Doodli-Do"
42	2	"Cassie Catches Up"	N/A	TBA	June 5, 2001
42	2	"Very Berry"	N/A	TBA	June 5, 2001
Cassie Catches Up: Cassie loses confidence when she can't seem to win a prize at the fair. She later learns that winning isn't always important after all. Very Berry: While everyone is picking Dragonberries, Ord gets stuck in a hole. Now, the rest of the group has a big problem to solve: How to help get him out. Song: "Friends"
43	3	"Finders Keepers"	N/A	TBA	June 6, 2001
43	3	"Remember the Pillow Fort"	N/A	TBA	June 6, 2001
Finders Keepers: The friends are going to the Dragon Land Aquarium for a day, but Wheezie has misplaced the tickets and forgets where she put them. Remember the Pillow Fort: Ord and Max pretend to be kings and build a pillow fort, but they fight with each other over which color it should be. Song: "Dance"
44	4	"Big Funky Cloud"	N/A	TBA	June 7, 2001
44	4	"Copy Cat"	N/A	TBA	June 7, 2001
Big Funky Cloud: Ord's favorite blanket goes down the Lost-Forever Hole and he has a Big Funky Cloud over him. So, the friends try cheer him up to make the cloud go away and help get over the loss of his blanket. Copy Cat: Max finds a Copy Cat with two heads. He names one end "Me" and the other end "Ow." However, the cat makes him act like Emmy and Emmy doesn't like it. Song: "Doodli-Do"
45	5	"One Big Wish"	N/A	TBA	June 8, 2001
45	5	"Breaking Up is Hard to Do"	N/A	TBA	June 8, 2001
One Big Wish: Max is still tired of being little, so he makes a wish in the wishing well which makes him grow giant. But after growing too big with no limit, he later regrets it and wishes to be his own size again. Breaking Up is Hard to Do: Max and Ord are both proud of the art project they created, but they have arguments since they have a hard time agreeing on who gets it to take it home first, since they both want to take it home at the same time. Quetzal later shows them how to take pride in sharing. Song: "Friends"
46	6	"A New Friend"	N/A	TBA	June 18, 2001
46	6	"Have No Fear"	N/A	TBA	June 18, 2001
A New Friend: Lorca, a dragon in a wheelchair, comes to the School in the Sky and leads the friends on an exciting treasure hunt. Have No Fear: Ord is afraid of BeeBee, Cassie's pet Butterfrog. But when BeeBee flies away, Ord must overcome his fear and come to her rescue. Song: "Dance"
47	7	"Cassie the Green-Eyed Dragon"	N/A	TBA	June 19, 2001
47	7	"Something's Missing"	N/A	TBA	June 19, 2001
Cassie the Green-Eyed Dragon: Cassie brings her baby brother, Finn, to school, but becomes jealous when her friends pay more attention to him instead of her. She later learns that it's also a good idea for her friends to get to know someone new. Something's Missing: Emmy is going to a weeklong summer camp while Max is in Dragon Land by himself again. Max misses Emmy and he and his dragon friends try to come up with a solution to Emmy missing out on the fun. Song: "Doodli-Do"
48	8	"A Crown for Princess Kidoodle"	N/A	TBA	June 20, 2001
48	8	"Three's a Crowd"	N/A	TBA	June 20, 2001
A Crown for Princess Kidoodle: On Princess Kidoodle's coronation day, the friends help her become Queen of the Doodle Fairies. Three's a Crowd: Emmy meets a new dragon friend named Nikki and begins playing with her, ignoring Cassie. Song: "Friends"
49	9	"Knuck Knuck, Who's Where?"	N/A	TBA	June 21, 2001
49	9	"Just Desserts"	N/A	TBA	June 21, 2001
Knuck Knuck, Who's Where?: Emmy and Cassie try to get some sticks back from the Giant of Nod after they get lost in a series of tunnels. Just Desserts: The friends accidentally ruin a Wiggly-Jiggly dessert Mungus the Giant made for his mother's birthday. So they all pitch in to help him make a new one. Max and Cassie go to pick Buttercups and Catgloves, Zak and Wheezie find pink and yellow seashells, and Ord and Emmy find blue and red round and square bubbles as the ingredients. Song: "Dance"
50	10	"Dragonberry Drought"	N/A	TBA	June 22, 2001
50	10	"A Snowman for All Seasons"	N/A	TBA	June 22, 2001
Dragonberry Drought: The friends go Dragonberry picking and discover that all the dragonberries have disappeared from Dragon Land until they realize that Mungus the Giant picked them all to bake a pie for his mother. A Snowman for All Seasons: The friends go to Snowy Summit to play with Chilly and Nippy (from "My Way Or The Snow Way") until they realize the weather is warming up and their snow friends are starting to melt. So they go to Polly Nimbus' cloud factory to bring the snow back. Song: "Doodli-Do"
51	11	"I Believe in Me"	N/A	TBA	September 3, 2001
51	11	"Bye Bye Baby Birdie"	N/A	TBA	September 3, 2001
I Believe in Me: Cassie is very nervous about being in the school play, so her friends help her practice. Bye Bye Baby Birdie: Emmy finds a baby Rhyme Bird and names her Cutie Pie. However, she realizes she mistakenly takes her away from her family and she and her friends go to bring her home. Song: "Ord Shuffle"
52	12	"Back to the Storybook"	N/A	TBA	September 4, 2001
52	12	"Dragon Scouts"	N/A	TBA	September 4, 2001
Back to the Storybook: The kids and dragons go back into Quetzal's magic pop-up book. This time, inviting Kiki, Finn, and Lorca to imagine the fairytales and meet characters themselves, such as Goldilocks, Jack from "Jack and the Beanstalk", the Old Woman Who Lived in the Shoe, and King Midas. Dragon Scouts: Cassie and Emmy join the Dragon Scouts. However, Cassie has to leave the Dragon Scouts to help her mother, leaving Emmy by herself. Song: "Cassie"
53	13	"The Serpent's Trail"	N/A	TBA	September 5, 2001
53	13	"Head Over Heels"	N/A	TBA	September 5, 2001
The Serpent's Trail: Emmy gets a new detective kit, but Cyrus the Slinky Serpent (from "Eggs Over Easy) steals it. The gang later tells Cyrus to give it back to her. Head Over Heels: Quetzal tells the friends to deliver gazpacho (ice cold soup) to a sick Fernando, but they must pass a grumpy tollbooth troll named Trumpy who tells people that the only way to get over his bridge is to cartwheel. However, Emmy has trouble doing cartwheels, so Max and the dragons help her get better at them. Song: "Wake Up"
54	14	"Sticky Situation"	N/A	TBA	September 6, 2001
54	14	"Green Thumbs"	N/A	TBA	September 6, 2001
Sticky Situation: Max is left to guard some baby animals, but he neglects his duties and lets a baby Dragonpig named Oinkers out. Green Thumbs: The friends bring a Dragon Daisy named Lily back to her family after she gets separated from them thanks to the heavy rain. Song: "Ord Shuffle"
55	15	"Teasing is Not Pleasing"	N/A	TBA	September 7, 2001
55	15	"Team Work"	N/A	TBA	September 7, 2001
Teasing is Not Pleasing: The friends are playing in a Dragonbasketball game, but the other team has lots of bullies, especially two dragons named Buster and Mooky, and they tease Emmy during the game. Team Work: Zak and Wheezie get sprayed by a Stinkydink Bug and lose their badges to Speedy the turtle while attempting to get the terrible stink off. So they must work together to get them back. Song: "Cassie"
56	16	"On Thin Ice"	N/A	TBA	September 10, 2001
56	16	"The Shape of Things to Come"	N/A	TBA	September 10, 2001
On Thin Ice: Zak and Wheezie learn how to ice skate on their way to Willie the Seal's birthday party. The Shape of Things to Come: After Zak's Dragon Disc falls into Marshmallow Marsh, the kids and dragons go to Crystal Cave, using Max's knowledge of different shapes. Song: "Wake Up"
57	17	"Hide and Can't Seek"	N/A	TBA	September 11, 2001
57	17	"The Art of Patience"	N/A	TBA	September 11, 2001
Hide and Can't Seek: Ord isn't good at hide and seek and loses himself confidence. Luckily, his friends help him get better at it. The Art of Patience: On Quetzal's birthday everybody makes him birthday presents out of Color Clay, but when Max becomes impatient and makes the sculptures dry faster, they all melt away. So, they go to Rainbow Canyon to get some more Color Clay and replicate their sculptures in time for Quetzal's party. Song: "Ord Shuffle"
58	18	"So Long Solo"	N/A	TBA	September 12, 2001
58	18	"Hands Together"	N/A	TBA	September 12, 2001
So Long Solo: Zak invites the Jugglebug to perform in the Twilight Talent Show, but Wheezie scares it away by playing her trumpet. Hands Together: On Dragontines' Day, the friends participate in a special dance recital to the song "Los Pollitos", but Ord can't seem to get the moves right. Song: "Cassie"
59	19	"Sneezy Does It"	N/A	TBA	September 13, 2001
59	19	"Try It, You'll Like It"	N/A	TBA	September 13, 2001
Sneezy Does It: The friends help the Big Whistling Wind get over a cold. Try It, You'll Like It: Zak is nervous when he encounters the new additions to the Dragon Land amusement park since he thinks he won't like them, and the others must try to show him that trying new things isn't so bad. Song: "Wake Up"
60	20	"Just for Laughs"	N/A	TBA	September 14, 2001
60	20	"Give Zak a Hand"	N/A	TBA	September 14, 2001
Just for Laughs: The friends team up to search for eggs in the Custard Egg Hunt, but they have their hands full looking after Kiki and Finn. Give Zak a Hand: The friends are invited to the newly reformed Spike's fiesta, but Zak's wrist is injured, so the gang shows him how to play the game Head, Shoulders, Knees, and Toes in a different way. Song: "Ord Shuffle"
61	21	"Make No Mistake"	N/A	TBA	September 17, 2002
61	21	"The Balancing Act"	N/A	TBA	September 17, 2002
Make No Mistake: Max is nervous he'll make a mistake in the school play. But when Ord and Quetzal both slip up on stage and laugh it off, he realizes the show must go on. The Balancing Act: Ord loses Emmy's skateboard while riding it, so the gang goes in search of the board and faces several balancing challenges. Song: "Be a Dragon"
62	22	"Room for Change"	N/A	TBA	September 24, 2002
62	22	"The Sorrow and the Party"	N/A	TBA	September 24, 2002
Room for Change: Cassie has to give up her old room for some new eggs her mother has laid, and is afraid she won't like her new room. The Sorrow and the Party: Max is down in the dumps because he didn't get invited to his friend Brian's birthday party, so his friends all try to cheer him up by doing fun activities in Dragon Land. Song: "Try"
63	23	"The Grudge Won't Budge"	N/A	TBA	October 1, 2002
63	23	"Putting the Fun in Fun Houses"	N/A	TBA	October 1, 2002
The Grudge Won't Budge: Zak has a grudge against Wheezie, and then a large animal called a Grudge appears and won't move unless Zak lets go of his grudge. Putting the Fun in Fun Houses: Ord is scared to go into a dark fun house at the Dragon Land Fair, so his friends try different strategies to help him overcome his fear. Song: "Be a Dragon"
64	24	"Puzzlewood"	N/A	TBA	October 8, 2002
64	24	"Let's Dance"	N/A	TBA	October 8, 2002
Puzzlewood: Max, Emmy and the dragons discover getting lost can be fun when they have to put their heads together to find a way out of the Puzzlewood forest. Let's Dance: The friends meet a gremlin named Greta who has three magic boxes with a surprise in each one. After opening two of the boxes despite being told not to, Wheezie learns that it's better to wait. Song: "Try"

=== Special (2003) ===
There was one special episode of Dragon Tales, "Let's Start a Band!", which was released in 2003.

No.	Title	Directed by	Written by	Original release date
1	"Let's Start a Band!"	Kim Swink	Melody Fox	March 2, 2003
The Dragon Tales friends embark on a musical adventure along with some real-life children, namely Sam and Jennifer. Note: This special episode is dedicated to the memory of Nina Elias-Bamberger (the executive producer of Dragon Tales), who died of ovarian cancer on November 20, 2002.

=== Season 3 (2005) ===
No. overall	No. in season	Title	Written by	Storyboard by	Original release date
65	1	"To Fly with a New Friend"	Dean Stefan	Art Mawhinney & Michael Borkowski & Lynell Forestall	February 21, 2005
Max and Emmy introduce their new 8-year old next-door neighbor named Enrique, who moved to the United States from Colombia, to their friends in Dragon Land. Song: "When You Make a New Friend" Note 1: Later adapted into part of the special, PBS Kids: Big, Big Friend Day, on November 25, 2005. Note 2: This episode is dedicated to the memory of Nina Elias-Bamberger. Note 3: This episode also had two parts.
66	2	"Rise and Bloom"	N/A	TBA	February 22, 2005
66	2	"Super Snow Day"	N/A	TBA	February 22, 2005
Rise and Bloom: Max wants to see the Bursting Blossoms event in Dragon Land, but it happens at sunrise and he's afraid he'll sleep through it. Super Snow Day: The friends go sledding up at Snowy Summit with their friends Chilly and Nippy, but they must first help Enrique get used to snow, which he has never seen before. Song: "Dragon Stomp"
67	3	"Musical Scales"	N/A	TBA	February 23, 2005
67	3	"Hand in Hand"	N/A	TBA	February 23, 2005
Musical Scales: Zak and Wheezie are singing a song named "El Coqui" that Enrique taught them for a concert, but it happens when they are shedding their scales and are nervous about the audience making fun of them. Hand in Hand: Enrique goes to a wishing well to wish that Max and Emmy would stop fighting with each other, but it ends up with Max and Emmy's hands being stuck together, and the gang must revisit the wishing well to get Max and Emmy's hands unstuck. Song: "Zak & Wheezie"
68	4	"Sky Soccer"	N/A	TBA	February 24, 2005
68	4	"Making It Fun"	N/A	TBA	February 24, 2005
Sky Soccer: Ord has lots of trouble playing soccer, so his friends help him get better at it by holding drills. Making It Fun: The friends help paint the racetrack for the Junior Unicorn Race for their friend Eunice, but they find the job very boring and exhausting. Song: "Making It Fun"
69	5	"Itching for a Cure"	N/A	TBA	February 25, 2005
69	5	"The Big Race"	N/A	TBA	February 25, 2005
Itching for a Cure: The friends try to build a house of cards, but the houses fall down when an earthquake shakes them. The shaking turns out to be Mungus the Giant, who has a terrible rash on his back. The Big Race: There's a big race in Dragon Land, and Enrique helps modify Lorca's wheelchair, but leaves him out. Song: "Hola"
70	6	"Lucky Stone"	N/A	TBA	March 1, 2005
70	6	"Max Loves a Train"	N/A	TBA	March 1, 2005
Lucky Stone: Repeat of an episode aired during the second season. Max Loves a Train: Max and his friends help find missing tracks so they can ride the Dragon Land Express. Song: "Ord Shuffle"
71	7	"A New Friend"	N/A	TBA	March 2, 2005
71	7	"El Día del Maestro"	N/A	TBA	March 2, 2005
A New Friend: Repeat of an episode aired during the second season. El Día del Maestro: Enrique and his friends help out in the El Día del Maestro, a concert held every year on a different day in Dragon Land for Quetzal. Meanwhile, Cassie must learn to be a good teacher on how to make chalupas. Song: "Friends"
72	8	"Finn's Blankie"	N/A	TBA	March 3, 2005
72	8	"Let's Dance"	N/A	TBA	March 3, 2005
Finn's Blankie: Cassie's mom throws Finn's blankie in the laundry and Finn is very upset and throws a big tantrum about it. Let's Dance: Repeat of an episode aired during the second season. Song: "Be a Dragon"
73	9	"Express Yourself"	N/A	TBA	March 4, 2005
73	9	"A Snowman for All Seasons"	N/A	TBA	March 4, 2005
Express Yourself: Enrique gives Cassie a nickname she doesn't like, since it reminds her of a new dragon in school who used to bully her, but Cassie is too shy to express her feelings to him. A Snowman for All Seasons: Repeat of an episode aired during the second season. Song: "Speak Up"
74	10	"Prince for a Day"	N/A	TBA	March 7, 2005
74	10	"So Long Solo"	N/A	TBA	March 7, 2005
Prince for a Day: Ord saves Princess Kidoodle and becomes a hero, but when he has to choose which snack the kingdom would rather eat since the fairies fight with each other over it, he loses himself confidence and wants to give up. So Long Solo: Repeat of an episode aired during the second season. Song: "Doodli-Do"
75	11	"The Balancing Act"	N/A	TBA	March 8, 2005
75	11	"A Small Victory"	N/A	TBA	March 8, 2005
The Balancing Act: Repeat of an episode aired during the second season. A Small Victory: Max and Lorca are teamed together for a scavenger hunt. Max is too small to do very much and is still tired of it, and Lorca can't fly since he's disabled. However, Lorca shows Max that they can use their disadvantages to win the hunt and collect plants to add to their garden. Song: "Try"
76	12	"Feliz Cumpleaños, Enrique"	N/A	TBA	March 9, 2005
76	12	"On Thin Ice"	N/A	TBA	March 9, 2005
Feliz Cumpleaños, Enrique: The friends hold a birthday party for Enrique in Dragon Land, but he still misses the Colombian birthday traditions and feels sad. On Thin Ice: Repeat of an episode aired during the second season. Song: "When You Make a New Friend"
77	13	"Teasing is Not Pleasing"	N/A	TBA	March 10, 2005
77	13	"Down the Drain"	N/A	TBA	March 10, 2005
Teasing is Not Pleasing: Repeat of an episode aired during the second season. Down the Drain: Captain Scallywag accidentally pulls the plug that holds the water in Dragoon Lagoon, and it's up to him and the friends to get the water back. Song: "C'mon and Blow"
78	14	"All That Glitters"	N/A	TBA	March 11, 2005
78	14	"Dragonberry Drought"	N/A	TBA	March 11, 2005
All That Glitters: Max accidentally loses Quetzal's precious golden scale and he is afraid Quetzal will be upset about what happened to it. Dragonberry Drought: Repeat of an episode aired during the second season. Song: "Dance"
79	15	"A Crown for Princess Kidoodle"	N/A	TBA	March 14, 2005
79	15	"Play It and Say It"	N/A	TBA	March 14, 2005
A Crown for Princess Kidoodle: Repeat of an episode aired during the second season. Play It and Say It: Ord is forgetting the Spanish numbers Quetzal is teaching him, and he is upset. Luckily, his friends help him get better at it while playing a game of Hot and Cold. Song: "Hola"
80	16	"Moving On"	N/A	TBA	March 15, 2005
80	16	"Head Over Heels"	N/A	TBA	March 15, 2005
Moving On: Cassie's sister Sophie is going away to cooking school, and Cassie is sad when she leaves. Head Over Heels: Repeat of an episode aired during the second season. Song: "Cassie"
81	17	"All Together Now"	N/A	TBA	March 16, 2005
81	17	"Team Work"	N/A	TBA	March 16, 2005
All Together Now: The friends go to the Dragon Land Carnival, but when Emmy and Enrique go off to play together, Max feels left out. However, Emmy and Enrique don't notice it. Team Work: Repeat of an episode aired during the second season. Song: "Speak Up"
82	18	"Making It Fun"	N/A	TBA	March 17, 2005
82	18	"The Sorrow and the Party"	N/A	TBA	March 17, 2005
Making It Fun: Repeat of an episode aired earlier in this season. The Sorrow and the Party: Repeat of an episode aired during the second season. Song: "Making It Fun"
83	19	"Itching for a Cure"	N/A	TBA	March 18, 2005
83	19	"Cassie Catches Up"	N/A	TBA	March 18, 2005
Itching for a Cure: Repeat of an episode aired earlier in this season. Cassie Catches Up: Repeat of an episode aired during the second season. Song: "Dragon Stomp"
84	20	"Sad Little Star"	N/A	TBA	March 21, 2005
84	20	"Try It, You'll Like It"	N/A	TBA	March 21, 2005
Sad Little Star: The friends help a star named Celeste join in on the daytime activities she always misses. Try It, You'll Like It: Repeat of an episode aired during the second season. Song: "When You Make a New Friend"
85	21	"The Big Race"	N/A	TBA	March 22, 2005
85	21	"Bye Bye Baby Birdie"	N/A	TBA	March 22, 2005
The Big Race: Repeat of an episode aired earlier in this season. Bye Bye Baby Birdie: Repeat of an episode aired during the second season. Song: "Making It Fun"
86	22	"Sky Soccer"	N/A	TBA	March 23, 2005
86	22	"Room for Change"	N/A	TBA	March 23, 2005
Sky Soccer: Repeat of an episode aired earlier in this season. Room for Change: Repeat of an episode aired during the second season. Song: "Try"
87	23	"Rise and Bloom"	N/A	TBA	March 24, 2005
87	23	"Dragon Scouts"	N/A	TBA	March 24, 2005
Rise and Bloom: Repeat of an episode aired earlier in this season. Dragon Scouts: Repeat of an episode aired during the second season. Song: "Wake Up"
88	24	"Musical Scales"	N/A	TBA	March 25, 2005
88	24	"Something's Missing"	N/A	TBA	March 25, 2005
Musical Scales: Repeat of an episode aired earlier in this season. Something's Missing: Repeat of an episode aired during the second season. Song: "Zak & Wheezie"
89	25	"Green Thumbs"	N/A	TBA	March 28, 2005
89	25	"Hand in Hand"	N/A	TBA	March 28, 2005
Green Thumbs: Repeat of an episode aired during the second season. Hand in Hand: Repeat of an episode aired earlier in this season. Song: "C'mon and Blow" Note: Based on part of the special, PBS Kids Share the Earth Day.
90	26	"Cassie the Green-Eyed Dragon"	N/A	TBA	March 29, 2005
90	26	"Hello, Ms. Tipps"	N/A	TBA	March 29, 2005
Cassie the Green-Eyed Dragon: Repeat of an episode aired during the second season. Hello, Ms. Tipps: The class in the School-in-the-Sky has a substitute teacher, Ms. Tipps. The others have a fun day, but Lorca misses Quetzal's way of doing things. The others must figure something out to help convince him to change his mind. Song: "Cassie"
91	27	"Super Snow Day"	N/A	TBA	March 30, 2005
91	27	"Make No Mistake"	N/A	TBA	March 30, 2005
Super Snow Day: Repeat of an episode aired earlier in this season. Make No Mistake: Repeat of an episode aired during the second season. Song: "Flip Flop"
92	28	"Finders Keepers"	N/A	TBA	March 30, 2005
92	28	"A Storybook Ending"	N/A	TBA	March 30, 2005
Finders Keepers: Repeat of an episode aired during the second season. A Storybook Ending: It's time for the friends to choose from Quetzal's magic pop-up book, but Enrique has never chosen a story before. Song: "Friends"
93	29	"Just the Two of Us"	N/A	TBA	April 1, 2005
93	29	"Cowboy Max"	N/A	TBA	April 1, 2005
Just the Two of Us: Zak and Wheezie are working on a secret project and decide to work on it by themselves, but they find it is easier to complete it when they let their friends help them with it. Cowboy Max: After Max falls off a carousel horse and scrapes his elbow, he's afraid to ride again. Song: "Be a Dragon" Note: These episodes have aired in Season 3, when Enrique debuted in the show, and Enrique was noticeably absent in both of these episodes since they were originally supposed to air in Season 2. Therefore, these episodes have a continuation error, since it likely seems that the gang has probably not even met Enrique yet.
94	30	"Flip Flop"	N/A	TBA	April 11, 2005
94	30	"Just for Laughs"	N/A	TBA	April 11, 2005
Flip Flop: Zak and Wheezie discover a golden statue that makes them act like each other. After the statue gets lost by floating through a river, the gang must find out a way to find it to get Zak and Wheezie back to their original personalities. Just for Laughs: Repeat of an episode aired during the second season. Song: "Flip Flop" Note: This episode served as the series finale.

=== Unproduced and unaired pilot episodes (1999) ===
An unproduced and unaired episode (two unproduced segments) that was originally going to serve as an unaired pilot episode (two unaired pilot segments) according to writer Jeffrey Scott.

No.	Title	Original release date
1	"One Small Step for Cassie / Circle of Friends"	June 21, 1999 (unproduced/unaired)
One Small Step for Cassie: Max, Emmy, and their dragon friends take a trip to the moon. There, Cassie observes something very dangerous and is too afraid to speak up. Eventually, she speaks up and saves both herself and her friends from the danger. Circle of Friends: Max is not very good at drawing circles, and so his dragon friends try to help him. In the end, Max's circles improve a lot, and he feels much better. Song: N/A
