= Channel Umptee-3 =

Television series

- Also known as: Umptee-3
- Genre: Comedy
- Created by: Jim George
- Developed by: Jim George; Norman Lear; John Baskin
- Directed by: Chris Hedrick; Don Jurwich; Mike Peraza; David Schwartz; Bob Seeley
- Voices of: Gregg Berger; Greg Burson; Alice Ghostley; Jonathan Harris; Rob Paulsen; David Paymer; Neil Ross; Susan Silo
- Theme music composer: Jim George
- Opening theme: "Channel Umptee-3 Theme" performed by Rob Paulsen, David Paymer, and Jonathan Harris
- Ending theme: "Channel Umptee-3 Theme" (instrumental)
- Composer: Walter Murphy
- Country of origin: United States
- Original language: English
- No. of seasons: 1
- No. of episodes: 13

Production
- Executive producers: Jim George; Norman Lear; John Baskin; Richard Raynis; Everett Peck
- Producers: Jeff Kline; Peggy George; Bob Seeley
- Running time: 21 minutes
- Production companies: Adelaide Productions; Act III Productions; Enchanté George; Columbia TriStar Television

Original release
- Network: The WB (Kids' WB)
- Release: October 25, 1997 – February 20, 1998

Channel Umptee-3 (also known simply as Umptee-3) is a Saturday morning animated television series created by Jim George and produced by Norman Lear. It aired on The WB as part of the Kids' WB programming block from October 25, 1997 to February 20, 1998. The one-season cartoon was designed to teach children to appreciate the wonders of everyday things, such as sleep and water. The title is derived from the fictitonal number "umpteen". It was also the last television series that Lear was involved in as an executive producer (and the last to feature an original story) until the 2017 revival of One Day at a Time.

== Format ==
Ogden Ostrich, Holey Moley (a mole), and Sheldon S. Cargo (a snail) drive around the world in a van with their own underground pirate television station. Channel Umptee-3, which exists between other channels and is broadcast from a mobile station, tries to focus on a specific topic in each episode, but is normally diverted from it and shifted onto another topic; e.g., one episode started out discussing cats, but quickly segued into the subject of ownership (which was the real topic of that show). Meanwhile, "The Frumps" (i.e., Stickley Ricketts and his henchmen) would try to shut the station down or increase their own power, but whatever plan they came up with would fail.

The show made great use of stock footage, as did the earlier WB show Freakazoid! Also, the show sometimes made references to well-known films and TV shows; e.g., the episode "Yours, Mine, and Ours" included references to Cats, Harvey, Star Wars, Dragnet, and The People's Court, and the title was that of a classic film.

== Characters ==
=== The Umptees ===
- Ogden O. Ostrich (Rob Paulsen) – An excitable yellow ostrich who first came up with the idea for a television program to show everyone that "the world is a magical place" after pulling his head out of the ground one day and looking at the world around him. At the start of every episode, Ogden comes running up the camera yelling "Hey!" over and over.
- Holey Moley – A pantomime character. He is a large mole who carries a number of portable holes that allow him and his friends to go anywhere.
- Sheldon S. Cargo (David Paymer) – A large pink snail whose shell is fitted with a unicycle-like wheel to help him get around. Sheldon is the serious, professional member of the team; he tries his best to hold the show together, despite Ogden's almost hyperactive behavior. His name is derived from the French word "escargot".
- Professor Edwin I. Relevant (Greg Burson) – The station's resident expert on everything. Ogden and the others turn to Professor Relevant for information on the day's topic in almost every episode.
- Ted and Polly (Neil Ross and Susan Silo) – two newscasters who work for Channel Umptee-3.

=== The Frumps ===
- Stickley Ricketts (voiced by Jonathan Harris) – The elderly president of a corporation that produces boxes. Because the "Umptee-doodies" (as he calls them) encourage people to take things out of boxes and look at them in a new way, he sees them as a threat to his business. So he constantly plots to shut them down and "put them in a box, where they belong."
- Pandora Ricketts (voiced by Alice Ghostley) – Stickley's wife. She isn't nearly as obsessed as her husband where the Umptees are concerned. Pandora even likes to watch some of the shows, although she does not want Stickley to find out. Her name is derived from "Pandora's box".
- Ed and Bud (voiced by Neil Ross and Gregg Berger) – Two black-suited henchmen who carry out Stickley's orders and are almost never successful. Ed is the taller one, and Bud is the shorter, balding one.

=== Other voices ===
Other voice actors who appeared on the show included:

- Charlie Adler
- Susanne Blakeslee
- Liz Georges
- Jason Graae
- Maurice LaMarche
- Sharon Mack
- Danny Mann
- Pat Musick
- Patrick Pinney
- Roger Rose
- Tara Charendoff
- Laura Summer
- Ron Taylor
- Frank Welker

== Crew ==
- Mark Evanier – Voice Director

== Episodes ==
No.	Title	Directed by	Written by	Topic(s)	Original release date
1	"The Music Show"	Don Jurwich; Bob Seeley	Jim George; Mark Evanier	Music	October 25, 1997
2	"Umptee Sunrise"	Don Jurwich	Jim George; Mark Evanier	The sun	November 1, 1997
3	"The U.F.O. Show"	Michael Peraza	Jim George	UFOs and extraterrestrial life	November 8, 1997
4	"What's So Funny"	Chris Headrick	Jim George; Mark Evanier	Laughter and humor	November 15, 1997
5	"The Now Voyagers"	Michael Peraza	Jim George; Mark Evanier	Time	November 22, 1997
6	"Just Add Water"	Don Jurwich	Jim George	Water	December 6, 1997
7	"Perchance to Dream"	Chris Headrick	Jim George	Sleep and dreams	December 19, 1997
Ogden is determined never to sleep again because of a nightmare he'd had, and his friends try to explain to him that everyone needs to sleep.
8	"Sale of the Century"	Michael Peraza	Mark Evanier	Money	January 2, 1998
9	"The Fear Show"	Dave Schwartz	Jim George; Mark Evanier	Fear	January 9, 1998
10	"The Weather Show"	Michael Peraza	Mark Evanier	Weather	January 16, 1998
11	"Yours, Mine, and Ours"	Don Jurwich	Bob Keats	Ownership	February 6, 1998
The Umptees win an award in the form of a huge chocolate bunny, and Ogden and Sheldon argue over whether to eat it or display it; this leads to some information about ownership from Professor Relevant. Meanwhile, Stickley's men steal Holey Moley's portable hole, because Stickley believes that there's a fortune inside of it.
12	"The Lying Show"	Chris Headrick; Dave Schwartz	Mark Evanier	Truth and lies	February 13, 1998
13	"Words Are Weird"	Chris Headrick	Jim George	Words	February 20, 1998

== Episode status and streaming ==
Due to the short run and general obscurity of Channel Umptee-3, only four episodes and the intro music were initially preserved after its initial airing. Originally, the second, third, tenth and twelfth episodes were posted to YouTube, but they were blocked worldwide by Sony Pictures, leading them to be posted elsewhere, ultimately on the Internet Archive.

Currently, Sony Pictures Television has the full rights to Channel Umptee-3, and has the option to provide the series for streaming content providers. As of 2026, the full series is now available to watch on-demand for free via the streaming platform Roku Channel, marking the first time Channel Umptee-3 has been available to watch after its initial network run.
