= Dragon Tales =

American-Canadian educational children's animated series

- Genre: Adventure; Fantasy; Comedy; Educational
- Created by: Ron Rodecker; Jim Coane
- Developed by: Jim Coane; Wesley Eure; Jeffrey Scott; Cliff Ruby; Elana Lesser
- Directed by: Tim Eldred; Gloria Jenkins; Bob Hathcock; Curt Walstead; Phil Weinstein
- Voices of: Andrea Libman; Danny McKinnon; Ty Olsson; Chantal Strand; Jason Michas; Kathleen Barr; Eli Gabay; Scott McNeil; Garry Chalk; Aida Ortega
- Theme music composer: Mary Wood; Jesse Harris; Joey Levine
- Opening theme: "Dragon Tales" performed by Mary Wood
- Composers: Joey Levine & Co.; Jim Latham; Brian Garland; Cheryl Hassen
- Countries of origin: United States; Canada
- Original language: English
- No. of seasons: 3
- No. of episodes: 94 (155 original segments) (78 original episodes total) (list of episodes)

Production
- Executive producers: Jim Coane; Nina Elias-Bamberger; Jeff Kline; Jodi Nussbaum
- Producers: Richard Raynis; Jeff Kline; Ron Rodecker; Cliff Ruby; Elana Lesser; John Mariella; Cheryl Hassen; Pamela Aguilar
- Editors: Mark McNally; Anna Granfors
- Running time: 30 minutes
- Production companies: Sesame Workshop (Note: Credited as Children's Television Workshop (season 1).); Adelaide Productions (Note: Uncredited.); Sony Pictures Television (Note: Credited as Columbia TriStar Television (seasons 1–2).)
- Budget: Under $20 million (season 1)

Original release
- Network: PBS (PBS Kids) (United States); CBC (Kids'CBC) (Canada)
- Release: September 6, 1999 – April 11, 2005

Dragon Tales is an animated educational fantasy children's television series created by Jim Coane and Ron Rodecker, developed by Coane, Wesley Eure, Jeffrey Scott, Cliff Ruby and Elana Lesser, and produced by Sesame Workshop (formerly known as the Children's Television Workshop), Sony Pictures Television (formerly known as Columbia TriStar Television) and Adelaide Productions. The series focuses on the adventures of two siblings, Emmy and Max, and their dragon friends Cassie, Ord, and Zak and Wheezie.

The series began broadcasting on PBS on their newly-renamed PBS Kids block on September 6, 1999, with its final episode airing on April 11, 2005. Yearim Productions was responsible for the animation for all seasons (Sunwoo Entertainment and Wang Film Productions only did animation for season 1 and Rough Draft Korea only did animation for seasons 2 and 3), with the exception of Koko Enterprises, which recorded the show along with BLT Productions. The Corporation for Public Broadcasting, the United States Department of Education, cereal company Kellogg's and greeting card manufacturer, American Greetings were responsible for funding. The show is available to stream for free on Tubi and The Roku Channel.

== Development ==
Dragon Tales is inspired by the characters created in 1978 by Laguna Beach, California artist and retired educator Ron Rodecker. Rodecker was recovering from a coronary artery bypass graft when he began sketching dragons as a means of symbolizing forces in life that were too big to control. In 1995, Jim Coane, then a producer at Columbia TriStar Television, found the artwork and developed it into a television series with several writers. The project was considered something of a risky venture because it was not based on a well-known franchise like many children's television programs, such as Arthur or Paddington Bear. The series was immediately shipped to PBS member stations at the suggestion of PBS, but all originally passed at the time.

In October 1995, Jim Coane met Marjorie Kalins, senior VP of programming and production at Children's Television Workshop, and showed her the idea for the series. Kalins, who loved the idea, brought the series to Children's Television Workshop, which agreed to a partnership with the Columbia TriStar Television Group. Kalins helped him and Columbia TriStar Television obtain an $6.2 million grant from the Department of Education and the Corporation for Public Broadcasting. The grant proposal was written by former Days of Our Lives cast member and Finders Keepers host Wesley Eure. Coane stated that there was never any consideration of trying to shop the program to a commercial broadcast network and that PBS was, in his mind, the only destination for the program. As Columbia TriStar Television was the TV division of two major Hollywood film studios, which in turn are owned by the Sony Pictures Entertainment division of Japanese multinational conglomerate Sony, Dragon Tales became one of the few PBS Kids and Sprout programs to be co-produced by a major Hollywood studio's TV subsidiary; The other PBS shows were Bill Nye the Science Guy (made by Walt Disney Television), and Curious George (produced by Universal Animation Studios). In 2002, CTTV was renamed to Sony Pictures Television, a company that would co-produce the third season of the program.

After a tour of the lot of Sony Pictures Studios, Wesley Eure created the first treatment of the show, including the initial conception of the two-headed dragon Zak and Wheezie, back then known as "Snarf and Bugger." The series received a massive multi-million dollar grant from the federal government, beating out The Muppets and Sesame Street for the request. As part of the conditions for the grant, Eure was required to create a companion series for the program, which he titled Show and Tell Me, based on his own lecture series known as "Anyone Can Write a Book." Though the companion series was never actually created, Eure remains hopeful that it will one day be produced. Eure's name was not included in the initial credits for the series, forcing him to hire an attorney to ensure that he received credit.

Following the development of a show bible by Jeffrey Scott, with some tweaks by writers Cliff Ruby and Elana Lesser, the series was ordered for just over 60 eleven-minute episodes by PBS. Scott was assigned to write and edit half, with Ruby/Lesser assigned to the other half. At this point, the writing team was provided with a document titled "FUN AND LEARNING IN DRAGON LAND: A Writer's Guide to Dragon Tales Educational Content" which provided directives as to which curriculum should be included within the stories, such as "emotional challenges > understanding other people's emotions > recognizing and labeling feelings in others" and the statement that "CURRICULUM IS PARAMOUNT!"

After the creation of the first script, all writing parties involved agreed that the scripts "weren't fun or funny, they were flat and boring." The writers successfully explained to the consultants, educators, and psychologists of PBS that children watch television to be entertained and must be entertained to be educated. They were then provided with a new directive, "Come up with entertaining stories and shoehorn in the curriculum wherever it fits!" Scott states that from the experience he learned an invaluable lesson about how to create a successful preschool series. Dong Woo Animation, Rough Draft Korea, Sunwoo Entertainment, Wang Film Productions (season 1 only), Yearim, Siriol Productions (season 3 only) and Lotto Animation contributed the animation for this series. Dragon Tales is one of the last major animation productions in the West to use cel animation (in season 1 only; the series switched to digital ink and paint in season 2).

== Premise and overview ==
Dragon Tales has three primary educational goals. They are:

- To encourage children to take on new or difficult challenges in their lives
- To help children recognize that there is more than one way to approach a challenge
- To help children understand that to try and not succeed fully is a valuable and natural part of learning

— Dragon Tales official website Parents FAQ

The series focuses on the adventures of six-year-old Emmy and four-year-old Max, two Mexican-American human siblings. Upon moving into their new house, they find an enchanted dragon scale which, upon reciting a special rhyme, can magically transport them to Dragon Land, a whimsical fantasy world inhabited by many colorful dragons. Befriended by four dragons with distinctive personalities – the very shy, yet intelligent and sweet-natured Cassie; the very strong, yet fearful Ord; and polar opposite conjoined twins, neat-freak Zak and rambunctious Wheezie – Emmy and Max frequently travel to Dragon Land and help their friends in fulfilling particular quests, assisting them in their daily problems, and learning important morals through their experiences in Dragon Land. At the end of each episode, Emmy and Max hold hands and recite another special rhyme to return to Earth.

The dragons also each have their own dragon badges worn around their necks that glow when they accomplish something they usually have trouble with. For example, Cassie's glows when she overcomes her anxiety, Ord's glows whenever he faces his fears, and Zak and Wheezie's glow when they overcome their differences and work together.

To educate preschoolers mildly about Hispanic and Latino culture, a new character named Enrique was introduced during the show's third and final season, providing the series with a third protagonist. Surrounded by a variety of unique characters and faced with numerous differing situations, Emmy and Max commonly embark on adventures with their dragon friends, conquering fears or achieving goals despite any obstacles along the way.

As a series broadcast on PBS, the program has an educational focus, combining lessons of a pro-social nature with those of more general educational value. Educational themes covered included identifying shapes, learning words and letters in both English and Spanish, counting, and basic math. Social themes are also covered, such as good sportsmanship, the importance of being a good friend, overcoming obstacles such as jealousy or fears, and getting along with siblings. Many of the show's interstitial song segments, known as "Dragon Tunes," also covered such themes, such as "Make It Fun", which encourages viewers to not complain about having to do seemingly mundane chores such as washing dishes or helping parents with cooking meals, but instead, find ways to make them fun; and "Hum," which encourages those who had a fear of the dark or trying new things to hum softly to comfort themselves. Three stated goals of the program's educational philosophy are the encouragement of pursuing new experiences, finding ways to approach and learn from challenges, and that learning can come through trying and not succeeding entirely. Despite two of the show's human leads, Emmy and Enrique, being six and eight years old, the show's described target audience was children closer to the age of four.

Another key topic of the program is the encouragement of honest expressions of emotion. In "Cassie, the Green-Eyed Dragon," Cassie feels jealous of her little brother, Finn, who gets everyone's attention when she takes him to school for "circle time." Discussing the matter with her best friend, Emmy, and her teacher, Quetzal, helps her to understand that jealousy is a natural feeling that everyone experiences sometimes, but that there are ways that she can appreciate her brother, while still feeling appreciated herself. In "Feliz Cumpleaños, Enrique," Enrique feels sad and homesick for his homeland of Colombia when his birthday celebrations in Dragon Land are not like the traditions of those back in his old home. He talks with Quetzal, who encourages him to cry, even though he had been told that crying was something a boy at his age was not supposed to do. After doing so, he feels better and can enjoy his party celebrations.

As with Sesame Street, which is also produced by the Children's Television Workshop (now Sesame Workshop), the program's creators encourage "co-viewing," the practice of parents or other caregivers watching the program along with their children and engaging in activities such as discussion, singing and dancing, and pretend play. The program's official website offers several activities and lesson plans to aid in these efforts.

== Characters ==
Protagonists Emmy and Max (top image) in a season 2 episode of Dragon Tales, "Lucky Stone" (2001). Ord, Enrique, Max, Emmy, Zak and Wheezie, and Cassie in a season 3 episode (bottom image) of Dragon Tales, "Rise and Bloom" (2005).

=== Main ===
- Emmy (voiced by Andrea Libman) is a 6-year-old brunette girl and Max's older sister. She commonly appears as the leader of the group until she gave her position to Enrique while helping him get used to Dragon Land on his first day. She is known for saying "Definitely!", whenever a good idea arises. Her best friend is Cassie as she always rides on her when she's flying. She is also known for being impulsive and occasionally refuses to think before she acts. She can also occasionally be a bit bossy with Max, wanting things being done her way.
- Max (voiced by Danny McKinnon) is a 4-year-old boy and Emmy's younger brother. His best friend is Ord as he always rides on him when he's flying. He is also occasionally prone to anger and can rage very quickly. He is also known for saying "It's not fair!", whenever he gets upset or angry. He is also often seen to dislike being too little for certain activities and wishes he could be bigger.
- Enrique (appears in season 3 and is voiced by Aida Ortega) is a 6-year-old Hispanic boy and Emmy and Max's new next-door neighbor who moved from Colombia to the United States and also once lived in Puerto Rico. He is raised by his father and his grandmother. He travels to Dragon Land with Emmy and Max when Max encourages Emmy to share their secret. He is a bilingual character and teaches the meanings of words in Spanish to Emmy, Max and the dragons to give them the opportunity to learn a little more Spanish. He still misses his former homeland in Colombia and often talks about how he misses the traditions and parties he and his family used to have in their country of origin. However, he's glad he has met his new next-door neighbor friends and the dragons in Dragon Land. He rides on Zak and Wheezie who rarely had anyone riding on them prior to his debut.
- Cassie (voiced by Chantal Strand) is a very intelligent, shy, cute, reserved, and sweet pink female dragon who is Emmy's best friend. She has 72 brothers and sisters (although it was originally 74, but later retconned down to 72). She possesses a magical tendency to shrink when she is sad, or too ashamed of speaking up for herself.
- Ord (voiced by Ty Olsson) is a large blue male dragon who is Max's best friend. He occasionally turns invisible when he is upset or frightened. He's scared of many things, including the darkness, insects, etc. More than anything though, he wishes he could be braver. He is also allergic to dandelions and has a very big crave on dragonberries.
- Zak (voiced by Jason Michas) and Wheezie (voiced by Kathleen Barr) are conjoined twin green and purple dragons with opposite personalities; Zak is male and is neat, orderly, quiet, serious, stubborn, arrogant, lazy and pessimistic about many things on which he often complains about, while Wheezie is female and is free-spirited, playful, enthusiastic, energetic and always willing to have fun with her friends. Zak's catchphrase is "Take it easy, Wheezie!", which he often says to Wheezie when she moves around really fast, dragging him with her, while Wheezie's catchphrase is "Loooooove it!" when she loves something, much to Zak's annoyance sometimes.
- Quetzal (voiced by Eli Gabay) is an elderly yellow male dragon who is originally from Mexico and is the teacher at The School in the Sky where the young dragons attend. He is bilingual and speaks Spanish with a strong accent, giving the dragons the opportunity to learn a little more Spanish.

=== Recurring ===
- Arlo (voiced by Scott McNeil) is an orange male dragon who works at the Dragon Dump. He has a machine at the Dragon Dump which he calls his "lil' ol' recycler" that sorts out things that can be used again.
- Dr. Booboogone (voiced by Shirley Milliner) is a veteran pink dragon who works as a doctor who helps dragons and other species who are sick or hurt. She wears a doctor's coat.
- Captain Scallywag (voiced by Scott McNeil) is a human pirate who captains a flying ship.
- Chilly the Snowman (voiced by French Tickner) is a living snowman who lives on top of the Stickleback Mountains with his snowdog Nippy.
- Cyrus the Serpent (voiced by Ian James Corlett) is a conniving and sneaky lizard-like slinky snake, who serves as an antagonist in two episodes in the show.
- The Doodle Fairy is a fairy with green skin and purple dress. She does not speak but can doodle.
- Eunice (voiced by Janyse Jaud) is a blind winged unicorn who cannot see very well, so she wears glasses.
- Finn (voiced by Ellen Kennedy) is Cassie's younger brother. He is light blue, toddler-aged, has grown two front buck-teeth, loves his blankie, and is only just learning to fly. He is prone to throw tantrums when he gets upset.
- The Giant of Nod (voiced by Blu Mankuma in his first appearance and Paul Dobson in "Much Ado About Nodlings" onwards) is the leader of a group of gnome-like creatures called the Nodlings. Despite being no bigger than 12 inches, he is considered a giant due to him being bigger in comparison to the tiny Nodlings.
- Princess Kidoodle is the ruler of the Doodle Fairy Kingdom. She seems to be much older than any other doodle fairies.
- Kiki (voiced by Ellen Kennedy) is Cassie's baby sister. She is mint green, wears diapers, drinks from a baby bottle and loves playing with her "Squishy".
- The Lonely Dragon was a dragon who appeared in a flashback during the first episode. She wished to play with human children in Dragon Land, so she covered her shiniest scales in magic dust and blew them out of Dragon Land. Any child lucky enough to find one would be able to visit Dragon Land. The scale used by Max, Emmy and Enrique is one of them, making her the one responsible for the entire series.
- Lorca (voiced by Lenore Zann) is a crippled dragon and Max, Emmy, Zak, Wheezie, Ord and Cassie's friend. He was born without wings and has to use a wheelchair because he was born this way and is incapable of flight. Despite his physical limitations, however, Lorca can perform magic tricks and enjoys participating in adventures and sports activities and encourages his friends to think of new ways to do certain things.
- Norm the Number Gnome (voiced by Stevie Vallance) is a friendly little gnome who loves to count.
- Simon (voiced by Ian James Corlett) a flying gnome-like character who likes to play "Simon Says", his namesake game.
- Monsieur Marmadune (voiced by Cusse Mankuma) is the main ruler and keeper of Kingdom Come, who tells Ord that Kingdom Come is the happiest place a dragon could ever be.
- Mr. Pop (voiced Ian James Corlett) is a mischievous troll-like character that temporarily steals Wheezie's laugh with his sound switcher in "Wheezie's Last Laugh".
- Mungus (voiced by Garry Chalk) is a friendly giant who lives in a castle in the clouds. He knows many folks in Dragon Land since he can travel far and wide in just a few steps.
- Polly Nimbus (voiced by Kathleen Barr) is the operator of the cloud factory, which controls Dragon Land's weather.
- Priscilla (voiced by Erin Fitzgerald) is the manager at the Lost and Not-Yet-Found, who during her first appearance, was feeling very embarrassed because her wings that looked like feathers were much bigger than those of other dragons. She eventually realized that there is nothing wrong with being different when she uses her big wings to help Mungus clean up his castle in a "different" way.
- Sage (voiced by Pauline Newstone) is a dragon wizard who created the Big Storybook. She gave it to Quetzal under the condition that he keep it in the School in the Sky so everyone would be able to read it and experience the stories within.
- Sid Sycamore (voiced by Scott McNeil) is a talking tree who loves telling jokes that relate to the concept of trees.
- Sophie (voiced by Ellen Kennedy) is one of Cassie's older siblings. She is very talented at cooking, and left home to attend cooking school.
- Spike (voiced by Danny McKinnon) is a brief student who loves his yo-yo, but he can also act as a mean bully whenever he gets upset or lonely. He is paired up with Cassie when the group picks Dragon Plums. He bullies Cassie and when she gets upset about this, Quetzal advises her to be friends with Spike. Because Quetzal implied that Spike might only be a bully because he is upset and alone, much like how Cassie shrinks when she is shy, scared, or upset. Cassie befriended him by fixing his broken yo-yo and showing him kindness. Spike stopped being a bully and showed the group how to do yo-yo tricks. Later on in Season 2, Spike invited the group to his Spring Fiesta.
- Windy (voiced by Erin Fitzgerald in Season 1 and Maggie Blue O'Hara in Seasons 2-3) is a little wind who likes to blow like her father.
- Wyatt (voiced by Doug Parker) is a talking wishing well that immediately grants any wish for a single coin. He's old friends with Quetzal. He was originally called "Willie" but his name changed to Wyatt.
- Emmy and Max's Mom (voiced by Kathleen Barr) & Dad (voiced by Eli Gabay), who occasionally speak off-screen until Season 3.

== Episodes ==
Season	Segments	Episodes	Originally released	
Season	Segments	Episodes	First released	Last released
1	80	40	September 6, 1999	April 28, 2000
2	48	24	June 4, 2001	October 8, 2002
3	60	30	February 21, 2005	April 11, 2005

Dragon Tales aired a total of 94 episodes, 40 in its first season, 24 in its second season, and 30 in its third season. Each episode featured two original stories, aired back-to-back, split by the interstitial song segment "Dragon Tunes," all of which were eventually released on the show's music albums. Almost all episodes from the third season, however, generally contained at least one repeat of a story from the program's second season (As evidenced by the absence of Enrique.) and some were even repeats of material from that season and earlier material from the third season. In all, there were a total of 155 original stories. The show also had one special: Let's Start a Band, released in 2003, was a musical feature in which the characters of the show were seen alongside real human children.

== Broadcast history ==
=== Telecast ===
Dragon Tales premiered on PBS Kids on September 6, 1999, with the episode "To Fly with Dragons/The Forest of Darkness". The installment introduced the characters of Max and Emmy to Dragon Land after discovering a magical dragon scale in their new home and to their new dragon friends. In the first half, they discovered Ord's missing tooth, while the adventures continued in the second story with Ord facing his fear of the dark. A total of forty episodes were aired in the first season, with the finale airing on April 28, 2000. The show also aired on the original PBS Kids Channel until that network's closure in 2005. Dragon Tales was one of two CTW/Sesame Workshop shows airing on the PBS Kids Channel (along with Sagwa, the Chinese Siamese Cat) due to competing network Noggin having the cable rights to air legacy shows from the Workshop’s programming library (including its flagship series Sesame Street).

The show's second season premiered on June 4, 2001, and had 25 episodes. 20 of these episodes were broadcast from June 4, 2001 to September 14, 2001. The final installment of this set, "Just the Two of Us/Cowboy Max," was broadcast only in non-U.S. markets such as Guam and Canada and did not premiere to U.S. audiences until the program's third season, though "Cowboy Max" was released on DVD prior to this. Following this, no new episodes were aired until February 21, 2005.

The third season introduced the new character Enrique, an immigrant from Colombia, as well as an updated focus on folk songs and teaching of Spanish. The premiere installment, in two parts, showed Enrique being introduced to the sights and sounds of Dragon Land, learning to fly on Zak & Wheezie, and having his first adventure. The second half noticeably appeared as "The Mystery of the Missing Knuckerholes" in some listings, but on the program was simply titled as Part 2 of the episode. Though 29 episodes were broadcast, including "Just the Two of Us/Cowboy Max," only one story from each was original, while the others were a repeat of a story from the second season.

The series officially concluded on April 11, 2005 with segments "Flip Flop" and a repeat of "Just For Laughs" from the second season. After the series ended, reruns continued to air on the PBS Kids block and its sister channel PBS Kids Sprout through August 31, 2010. All mentions of Dragon Tales were completely removed from the PBS Kids website the next day.

The program's first musical album, Dragon Tunes, was released on March 20, 2001 and featured the character themes of Cassie and Ord, as well as tunes such as "Betcha Can," the "Wiggle Song" and "Shake Your Dragon Tail." A second album, More Dragon Tunes, was issued on February 15, 2005. This album introduced the character theme of Zak & Wheezie, as well as a number of new tunes introduced in the program's second and third seasons, including "Hola," "When You Make a New Friend" and remixes of two previous themes, "Shake Your Dragon Tail" and "Dance."

=== Other media ===
Throughout its history, a number of tie-in book releases were printed, some based on installments of the television program, others not. These included Cassie Loves a Parade, Ord Makes a Wish and Taking Care of Quetzal.

A special, Parent Tales from Dragon Tales, was produced in association with the program. The program was stated to use "messages built into the children's series to inform parental challenges. From bedtime dramatics to tantrums and assorted other small-fry rebellions..." For the special, parents were given video cameras used to record problematic behavior, then counselors analyzed the video footage and provided specific tips to the parents, who all reported significantly improved behavior two months later. The researchers also discovered from their work on the series that children often think in pictures and that visual aids are often helpful.

A direct-to-video special, Let's Start a Band!, featuring the dragon characters blended with live humans in a musical show based on the program's "Dragon Tunes" segments, was released on March 2, 2003.

== Music ==
Dragon Tales featured an original score composed by Jim Latham and Brian Garland. Each episode also included an interstitial segment between story airings known as "Dragon Tunes," featuring a song either based on one of the characters of the show, or designed to teach a lesson, such as "Stretch!", which encouraged viewers to reach forward for their goals and "Make a New Friend," which espoused the joys of forming a new friendship. The songs were released on the albums Dragon Tunes and More Dragon Tunes respectively.

== Reception ==
The series has received generally positive reviews, though its third season received mixed reception due to the introduction of Enrique. Common Sense Media rated the show a four out of five stars, stating: "Dragon Tales intends to positively impact a child's growth and development by encouraging a love of learning and helping children problem-solve and work through the challenges of growing up. The kids and dragons embark on different adventures and attend the School in the Sky, all while learning how to face their fears and handle new situations. The fun, nurturing, and sometimes challenging atmosphere of Dragon Land is a lot like preschool."

=== Awards ===
- 2000 Parents' Choice Silver Award Winner
- 2001 Parents' Choice Approved Award Winner (for "Dragon Tales: Dragon Tunes" CD)
- 2003 Parents' Choice Silver Award Winner (for "Let's Start a Band" video)
- 2005 Parents' Choice Approved Award Winner (for "Dragon Tales: More Dragon Tunes" CD)

The series was nominated for three Daytime Emmy Awards for Outstanding Children's Animated Program in 2001, 2002 and 2003, but did not win any. Jason Michas and Kathleen Barr also received Annie Award nominations in 2000 for their performances of Zak and Wheezie respectively.

== In other media ==
=== Video games ===
Cover of Dragon Tales: Dragon Adventures

On November 29, 2000, a video game based on the series, Dragon Tales: Dragon Seek, was released for the PlayStation. Published by NewKidCo, the player takes control of either Emmy or Max as the player navigates them through Dragon Land playing hide and seek, searching for either Ord, Cassie, Zak and Wheezie, Monsieur Marmaduke or Captain Scallywag that are hiding in certain areas in each level, the player would also have a choice to pick what character they want to search for at the beginning.

On December 16, 2000, another video game, Dragon Tales: Dragon Wings, was issued for Game Boy Color. Issued by NewKidCo, the game allowed players to take on the role of a novice dragon that was learning the secrets of flight at Quetzal's School in the Sky. Players moved through 15 levels of obstacles available in three difficulty levels. Reviews were mixed at Amazon.com, with an overall rating of 3/5 stars from ten reviewers. Many praised the graphics and fun of the game, but also felt that the game was too challenging for most younger players and did not offer much educational value.

On July 28, 2001, a third video game titled Dragon Tales: Dragon Adventures was released for Game Boy Color. Also issued by NewKidCo, the game included journeys to familiar locations from the show including the Stickleback Mountains, the Singing Springs and Crystal Caverns. The game included multiple skill settings and the option to play as Cassie, Ord, Emmy or Max, the title having been issued before the addition of Enrique to the series. A Game Boy Advance port of the game, issued by Global Star Software, was released on June 21, 2004, which also makes Zak and Wheezie playable in that version.

The show's official website also included a number of tie-in games, such as "Finn's Word Game" and "Dragonberry Surprise," though following the discontinuation of the site, such titles are no longer available.

In October 2004, Scholastic Parent & Child selected the CD-ROM game Learn & Fly With Dragons as teachers' pick for best new tech.

=== Marketing and merchandise ===
In addition to the various books, music albums and video game releases, numerous merchandise items featuring the characters of Dragon Tales were made available for purchase throughout the program's run. A total of six different designs featuring scenes from the program were featured on Welch's jam jars. An official board game for the series titled Dragon Tales: A Dragon Land Adventure, featured obstacles and memory games, with the goal of completing a puzzle. It was released by University Games and overall reviews were generally positive, though also expressed that the game was not very challenging. Other merchandise released for the series included plush toys for most of the major characters, such as Cassie and Quetzal though Enrique, seen only in the program's third season, was never released in plush form and was largely absent from merchandise releases. As early as January 1996, Hasbro reached an agreement for a line of plush, puzzles and board games related to the series to be released beginning in spring 2000.

For the program's video debut, multiple licensees, including Hasbro, Random House, Sony PlayStation and New Kid Toys promoted in tandem a "Dragon Tales Family Fun Getaway." Promoted via stickers on Dragon Tales merchandise and home video releases, the promotion was a contest with a grand prize of a four-day, three-night trip for four to San Diego, including a visit to the San Diego Zoo.

In 2001, Mott's ran a five-month Dragon Tales promotion with its apple juice packs. Dragon Tales character stickers were offered on 50 million packs. Additionally, 20 million bottles offered an instant win game with the top prize as a Dragon Tales themed party with the pink dragon Cassie and an additional 10,000 prizes of Dragon Tales books.

=== Live events ===
Ord, Max, Emmy, Cassie, Zak & Wheezie in Dragon Tales Live!

A musical stage show called Dragon Tales Live! features the characters and concepts of the show. It toured nationally in the United States. It featured performers playing the dragons in full body costumes and two real children in each production playing the roles of Max and Emmy. Shows included the "Missing Music Mystery", "Journey to Crystal Cave" and "The Riddle of Rainbow River."

Dragon Tales Live! toured from January 2002 until at least March 2006. The program was never modified to include the character of Enrique, who was not added until the program's final season, one year before productions of the stage show ended.
