= John Baskin (screenwriter) =

American television writer and producer

John Baskin is an American television writer and producer known for series such as Three's Company, Good Times, The Jeffersons, and Crazy Like a Fox. He was twice nominated for the Humanitas Prize.
