= Jim Coane =

American screenwriter

- Born: United States
- Education: Rutgers University
- Occupations: Producer, writer, director, development executive
- Years active: 1989–2008

Jim Coane is an American television executive producer, writer, director and development executive. He is an Emmy Award winner and the co-creator and executive producer of the PBS animated series Dragon Tales. He is credited as executive producer and director on many network, syndication and cable series, including Walking the Bible, Totally Hidden Video, America's Most Wanted and Futurequest.

Coane has executive produced hundreds of series' episodes, specials and pilots for all the major American networks, syndication and many domestic cable and foreign broadcasters. He received an Emmy award for the PBS documentary series Futurequest and his preschool children's series Dragon Tales was nominated three times. He worked on staff in overall producer deals at Sony Pictures Television, Fox Television Studios and was president of the production division of Unapix Productions. He is an adjunct professor at UCLA and The New York Film Academy in Los Angeles.

== Television Executive Producer Credits - Partial List ==
- Dragon Tales - Award winning PBS children's animated pre-school series coproduced by Sony and Sesame Workshop.
- America's Most Wanted - Producer during first three seasons of Fox series
- Letters From A Nut - Comedy/reality/scripted pilot for ABC based on book by Barry Marder and Jerry Seinfeld.
- Totally Hidden Video - Two seasons of hidden camera comedy series for Fox Network.
- Walking The Bible - Documentary series for PBS hosted by author Bruce Feiler and based on his NY Times best selling book.
- Future Quest - Emmy award winning documentary series for PBS. Hosted by Jeff Goldblum.
- Love Behind Bars - Documentary special for The Discovery Channel examines love and relationships in prison.
- Prison Doctors - Documentary special for The Discovery Channel about health system in prison.
- Wild on the Set - Animal Planet reality series features animal actors, their trainers and the roles they play in Hollywood movie and television production.
- Totally Out of Control - Reality series for ABC network about totally outrageous and unusual people, machines, weather. Additional episodes produced for Discovery Channel.
- "Nothing's On" - Comedy reality/scripted pilot for FX.
- Poker Royale - A series of Texas hold 'em poker tournaments for Game Show Network.
- Card Sharks - Nationally syndicated game show based on Goodson/Todman format, produced by Fremantle Media.
- Forces Beyond - Documentary series for TLC investigated both sides of the paranormal debate. Hosted by Nick Mancuso.
- Superstars of Action - Biography series of Hollywood’s greatest action stars, hosted by Robert Wagner for The Discovery Channel and various international broadcasters.
- Hollywood Stuntmakers - Behind the scenes look at Hollywood’s greatest action movies hosted by James Coburn for The Discovery Channel and various international broadcasters..
- Hollywood F/X MASTERS - Thirteen half-hours about Hollywood’s greatest special effects, hosted by Christopher Reeve for The Discovery Channel and various international broadcasters.
- Record Setters - Documentary series for TLC that examines world records.
- Now You See It - Documentary series for TLC that looks at history and mystery of magic.
- Fifty Years OF Hanna-Barbera Cartoons - One hour Special hosted by John Goodman for TNT.
- Laurie Cooks Light and Easy - Cooking series for TLC with LA Times food critic and author/chef Laurie Burrows Grad.
- Home Green Home - Gardening/craft/cooking series for PBS hosted Kelley Shea Smith.
- Simply Style - Fashion and style series for Discovery Channel with host/author and Hollywood stylist Leah Feldon.
- Family Values - Hidden camera game show pilot produced for Fox Television.
- Payback - Hidden camera game show pilot produced for Fox Television.
- High School Confidential - Produced and directed soap opera pilot for Fox TV.

== Awards ==
- 1990 Emmy Award for Futurequest, PBS, Non-fiction series.
- 1999 Emmy Award nomination, Executive Producer, Best Animated Children's Series, for Dragon Tales
- 2000 Annie Award for "Dragon Tales"
- 2000 Parents Choice Silver Award for "Dragon Tales"
- 2000 Emmy Award nomination, Best Animated Children's Series, for Dragon Tales
- 2001 Emmy Award nomination, Best Animated Children's Series, for Dragon Tales
- 2001 Parents' Choice Award Winner for "Dragon Tales: Dragon Tunes" CD
- 2003 Parents' Choice Silver Award Winner for "Let's Start a Band" video
- 2004 Parents Choice Award for "Dragon Tales"
- 2005 Parents' Choice Award Winner for "Dragon Tales: More Dragon Tunes" CD
