= Ron Rodecker =

American cartoonist (1930–2021)

- Born: March 4, 1930; Long Beach, California, U.S.
- Died: January 25, 2021 (aged 90); Nevada City, California, U.S.
- Occupations: Educator; artist; television writer
- Years active: 1955–2021
- Spouse: Katherine Rodecker (m. 1970)
- Children: 4

Ron Rodecker (March 4, 1930 – January 25, 2021) was an American educator, artist, and creator of Dragon Tales, a PBS animated TV series about two children who visit a world populated by friendly dragons.

== Dragon Tales ==
In 1999, Rodecker came up with the idea of Dragon Tales when solicited by Columbia TriStar (now Sony Pictures) to find a vehicle for his whimsical characters they witnessed at the Sawdust Summer Arts and Crafts Show in Laguna Beach, California. He created a treatment for a prospective new series and both Columbia TriStar and CTW (now Sesame Workshop) went in as partners to launch the series that aired on PBS and garnered three Emmy nominations.

== Personal life ==
Rodecker was an educator for 23 years and served for two years as an elementary school principal on Kwajalein Atoll in the country of Marshall Islands. Rodecker lived in Nevada City, California with his wife Katherine.

Rodecker was a frequent artist and vendor at the Sawdust Festival in Laguna Beach, known for his watercolor paintings of nature and dragons. It was at the Sawdust Festival where he was noticed by Columbia TriStar, leading to him creating Dragon Tales. One of his art inspirations was a book titled "Encyclopedia of Legendary Creatures", which inspired him to start making illustrations in watercolor rather than in black and white.

== Death ==
He died on January 25, 2021, at the age of 90 after a long battle with heart disease. He is survived by his wife Katherine of fifty years, four daughters Cherie, Erin, Lauren and Gretchen, and nine grandchildren Lindsay, Josh, Mariah, Andrew, Spencer, Tristin, Griffin, Charlotte and Tessa.
