= Tara Strong filmography =

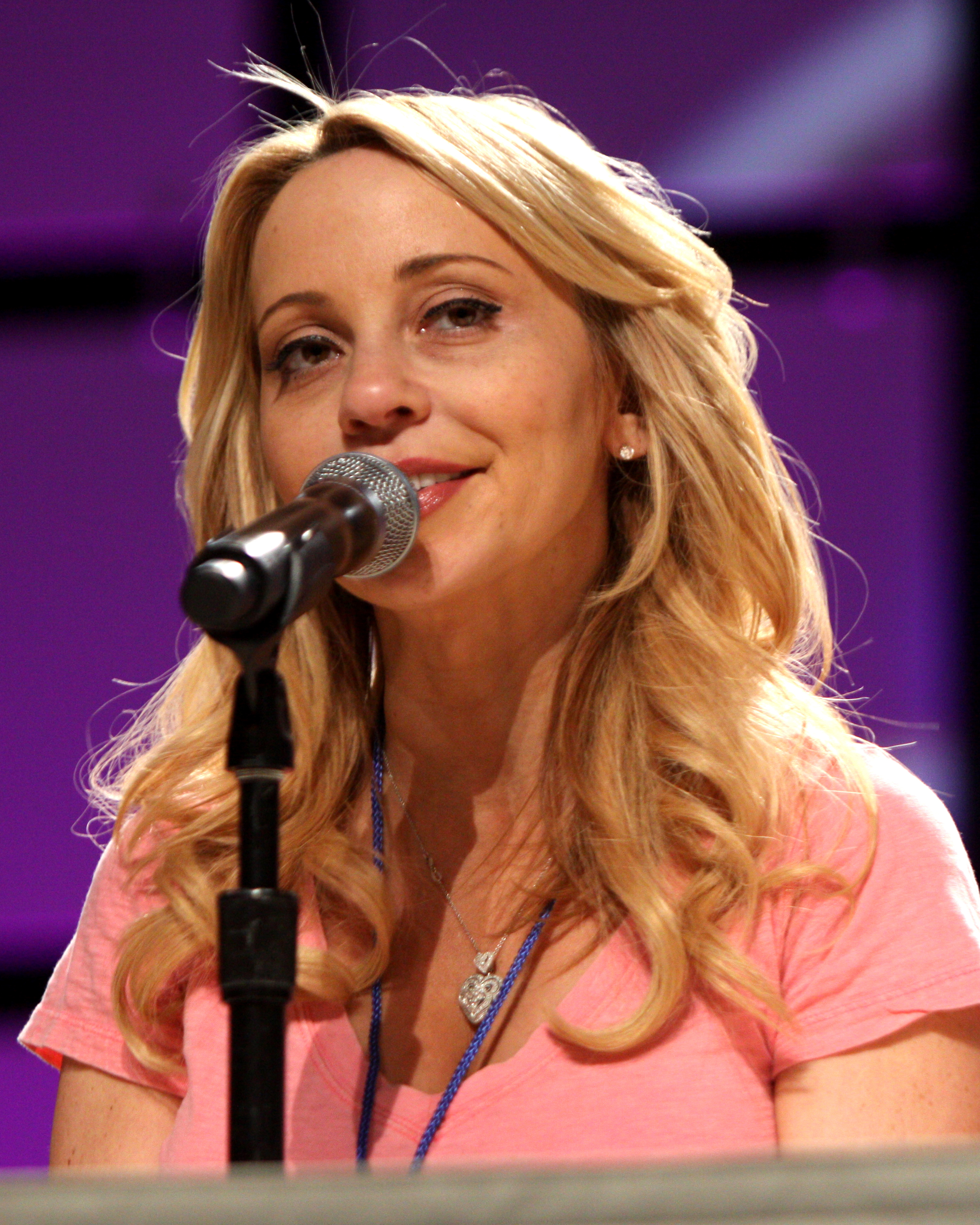
Strong at Comicon Phoenix, 2013.

Tara Strong (née Charendoff) is a Canadian-American actress who has provided voice-work for animation and video games and has performed in live-action. Her roles include animated series such as 101 Dalmatians: The Series, Jakers! The Adventures of Piggley Winks, Rugrats, The Powerpuff Girls, The Fairly OddParents, Teen Titans, Wow! Wow! Wubbzy!, My Little Pony: Friendship Is Magic and Unikitty! and video games such as Mortal Kombat X, Final Fantasy X-2 and the Batman: Arkham series. She has earned nominations from the Annie Awards and Daytime Emmys and an award from the Academy of Interactive Arts & Sciences. In 2004, she won an Interactive Achievement Award for her role as Rikku in Final Fantasy X-2. She also served as the announcer for the 1999 Kids' Choice Awards, appeared as a guest panelist at several fan conventions (including BotCon, Jacon, Comic-Con International and Anime Overdose) and was featured on the front cover of the July/August 2004 issue of Working Mother magazine, in which she said, "My son is now old enough to respond to my work. To me, that's what it is all about." Strong has earned five Annie Award nominations.

In 2013, Strong won the Shorty Award for "Best #Actress" for her use of social media. The Behind the Voice Actors website selected her for a BTVA Voice Acting Award for Voice Actress of the Year for 2013 and nominated her for the 2011 and 2012 years.

== Filmography ==
=== Animation ===
List of voice performances in animation
Year	Title	Role	Notes	Source
1987	Sylvanian Families	Bridget		
1987	Hello Kitty's Furry Tale Theater	Hello Kitty	First major role	
1987	Maxie's World	Carly		
1987	My Pet Monster	Annie		
1987–88	The Care Bears Family	Carol, Rebecca, Claire, Swift Heart Rabbit, Anna		
1987–88	Garbage Pail Kids	Patty Putty		
1988	Clifford the Big Red Dog	Little Girl and Jane		
1988	Madeline	Chloe	HBO special	
1989–91	Babar	Young Celeste		
1989–91	Beetlejuice	Claire Brewster, Bertha, Little Miss Warden	Grouped under "Additional Voices"	
1990	Piggsburg Pigs!	Dotty, Prissy	Grouped under "Featuring the Voices of"	
1990	The Adventures of Super Mario Bros. 3	Hop Koopa	Grouped as "Voice Talents of"	
1991	Bill & Ted's Excellent Adventures	Mary Jane Smedley	Season 2 Grouped as "Additional Voices"	
1991	ProStars	Laura		
1991	Wish Kid			
1991	Here's How!	Host / Mouse	TVOntario series	
1991	The Raccoons	Donna	Episode: "Join the Club!"	
1991	Super Mario World	Hop Koopa		
1993	Tales from the Cryptkeeper	Jenny Lawson	Episode: "Pleasant Screams"	
1993–97	X-Men: The Animated Series	Illyana Rasputin		
1995–98	Gadget Boy & Heather	Heather	Also Gadget Boy's Adventures in History	
1995–2001	Little Bear	Tutu		
1996	Ace Ventura: Pet Detective	Various		
1996–97	The Real Adventures of Jonny Quest	Kazrina, Irina Kafka		
1996–98	Adventures from the Book of Virtues	Girl	Grouped under "Cast"	
1996–2003	Dexter's Laboratory	Various		
1997	101 Dalmatians: The Series	Spot, Two-Tone, Vindella de Vil		
1997	Extreme Ghostbusters	Kylie Griffin		
1997	The Angry Beavers	Nurse Trudy	Episode: "Fakin' It"	
1997–98	Channel Umptee-3	Holey Moley, others		
1997–99	Cow and Chicken	Various		
1997–99	The New Batman Adventures	Barbara Gordon / Batgirl		
1997–2000	Pepper Ann	Brenda	2 episodes: "Old Best Friend" & "A Valentine's Day Tune"	
1997–2004	Rugrats (1991)	Dil Pickles, Timmy McNulty, various voices		
1998	Tekkaman Blade II	Yumi Francois	English dub	
1998–99	Oh Yeah! Cartoons	Mina, various		
1998–2004	King of the Hill	Various		
1998–2005	The Powerpuff Girls	Bubbles, various voices	Nominated – Annie Award for Outstanding Individual Achievement for Voice Acting in an Animated Television Production, 27th Annie Awards	
1999	Timon & Pumbaa	Princess Claudia	Grouped under "With the Voice Talents of"	
1999	The Kids from Room 402	Penny Grant	Grouped under "Voices"	
1999–2000	Detention	Shareena Wickett		
1999–2004	Johnny Bravo	Various voices		
2000	As Told by Ginger	Blake Gripling	Episode: "The Party"	
2000	The Wild Thornberrys	Little Boy	Episode: "The Legend of Ha Long Bay"	
2000	Buzz Lightyear of Star Command	Bonnie	Episode: "Eye of the Tempest"	
2000–01	The Kids from Room 402	Penny Grant, Sanjay, Joey		
2000–01	Clerks: The Animated Series	Giggling Girl	Grouped under "Also Starring"	
2000–02	Gotham Girls	Barbara Gordon / Batgirl, Elizabeth Styles	Web series	
2000–04	The Weekenders	Kristi, Kandi		
2000–18	Family Guy	Various		
2001–02	The Zeta Project	Vega, Macy	2 episodes	
2001–05	The Proud Family	Bebe and Cece Proud, Puff		
2001–17	The Fairly OddParents	Timmy Turner, Poof, Britney Britney, others	Nominated – Annie Award for Voice Acting in a Television Production, 39th Annie Awards; Nominated – Annie Award for Outstanding Individual Achievement for Voice Acting by a Female Performer in an Animated Television Production, 29th Annie Awards; Nominated – BTVA Voice Acting Award for Best Female Lead Vocal Performance in a Television Series, 2011	
2002	Totally Spies!	Honeybees	Episode: "The Black Widows"; Grouped under "With the Voice Talents of"	
2002	Ozzy & Drix	Jenna, Carbon Monoxide	2 episodes	
2002–03	Lloyd in Space	Various	Grouped under "With the Voice Talents Of"	
2002–03, 2017	Samurai Jack	Ashi, various voices		
2002–04	Fillmore!	Ingrid Third, others		
2002–04	Diva Starz	Miranda		
2002–07	Kim Possible	Tara, Joss Possible, Britina	Grouped under "With the Voice Talents of"	
2003	Justice League	Sera, Queen	2 episodes	
2003	Spider-Man: The New Animated Series	Christina	Episode: "Head Over Heels"; Grouped under "Also Starring"	
2003–05	Duck Dodgers	Various voices		
2003–06	Codename: Kids Next Door	Mushi Sanban, others	Grouped under "Additional Vocal Assault"	
2003–06	Teen Titans	Raven, Kole, Jinx, Gizmo, Elasti-Girl, Kitten, Teether		
2003–06	Lilo & Stitch: The Series	Angel, Adult Lilo, BeBe Proud, CeCe Proud, Puff	Grouped under "With the Voice Talents of"	
2003–06	Xiaolin Showdown	Omi, Megan, T-Rex		
2003–07	Jakers! The Adventures of Piggley Winks	Dannan O'Mallard, Molly Winks	Nominated – Annie Award for Voice Acting in an Animated Television Production, 31st Annie Awards; Nominated – Daytime Emmy Award for Outstanding Performer in an Animated Program, 33rd Daytime Emmy Awards	
2003–08	All Grown Up!	Dil Pickles		
2004	Megas XLR	Pulsar, Comet		Episode: "Ultra Chicks"
2004–05	Stroker and Hoop	Various		
2004–06	My Life as a Teenage Robot	Killgore, Computer	2 episodes	
2004–07	Danny Phantom	Ember McLain, Penelope Spectra, Star, others		
2004–07	Drawn Together	Princess Clara, Toot Braunstein, others		
2004–09	Foster's Home for Imaginary Friends	Terrence, others		
2005–06	The Buzz on Maggie	Bella Pesky, Dawn Swatworthy, Maria Monarch		
2005–07	Camp Lazlo	Tootie, Amber, Honey, Mother Rooster		
2005–07	American Dragon: Jake Long	Kara & Sara, Veronica, Stacey		
2005–07	The Life and Times of Juniper Lee	Roger Radcliffe, Melissa O'Malley, Vikki Devyne, Beatrice, Baby Cousin, Otis, Lila		
2005–08	Ben 10	Ben Tennyson, Upgrade, Gwendolyn, Benwolf, Ken Tennyson, Lucy Mann, Sandra Tennyson, Buzzshock, various voices		
2006	Justice League Unlimited	Johnny	Episode: "Patriot Act"	
2006	Super Robot Monkey Team Hyperforce Go!	Alliana	2 episodes	
2006–07	Legion of Super Heroes	Esper Lass, Emerald Empress, Alexis	2 episodes	
2006–10	Wow! Wow! Wubbzy!	Daizy, Trudy, Murphy, Shimmer, Ball Kid #2, Jumping Kid #1, Jumping Kid #2, Swinging Kid #1, Info Booth Woman, Arcade Girl, Kool Kid #3, Additional Voices		
2007	Afro Samurai	Otsuru, Jiro		
2007	Class of 3000	MacKenzie, Inga, Billy	Episode: "Prank Yankers"	
2007–08	My Friends Tigger & Pooh	Porcupine	Grouped under "With the Voice Talents of"	
2007–09	Sushi Pack	Maguro		
2007–09	Transformers: Animated	Sari Sumdac, Slipstream, Daniel Witwicky, Strika, Red Alert, Slo-Mo, various voices		
2007–10	The Boondocks	Cindy McPhearson	Grouped under "Also Starring"	
2007–10	Chowder	Truffles, various voices		
2008	Avatar: The Last Airbender	Actress Azula	Episode: "The Ember Island Players"	
2008–10	Ben 10: Alien Force	Princess Attea	Episode: "X = Ben + 2"	
2008–15	The Penguins of Madagascar	Various voices		
2008–11	Batman: The Brave and the Bold	Huntress, Billy Batson, Mary Marvel		
2009	Phineas and Ferb	Additional Voices	Episode: "Interview With a Platypus"	
2009	Wolverine and the X-Men	Marrow, Dust, X-23, Firestar, Stepford Cuckoos, Magik		
2009	Random! Cartoons	Beth Tezuka	Episode: "The Bravest Warriors"	
2009–11	The Super Hero Squad Show	H.E.R.B.I.E., Scarlet Witch, Princess Anelle, others		
2010–11	Sym-Bionic Titan	Ilana		
2010–12	Ben 10: Ultimate Alien	Young Ben Tennyson, Serena		
2010–13	Mad	Various	Grouped under "Starring the Voices of"	
2010–13	Pound Puppies	Wagster	Episode: "The Catcalls"	
2010–19	My Little Pony: Friendship Is Magic	Twilight Sparkle, Twilight Velvet	Also co-story for the episode "Sparkle's Seven"	
2011	The Looney Tunes Show	Motel Receptionist	Episode: "Jailbird and Jailbunny"	
2011	ThunderCats	Young Lion-O	Episode: "Between Brothers"	
2011, 2019–22	Young Justice	Serling Roquette, Negative Woman, Casey Brinke, Tara Markov / Terra		
2011–12	Dan Vs.	Various	Grouped under "Also Starring"	
2012	Napoleon Dynamite	Dody, Candy, Egg Queen, Kangaroo, Scantronica and Shaylene		
2012	Motorcity	Lizzie, #2		
2012	Gravity Falls	Additional voices		
2012	Electric City	Makaela	Web series	
2012–13	Green Lantern: The Animated Series	Iolande		
2012–14	DC Nation Shorts	Raven, Billy Batson, Batgirl		
2012–14	Winx Club (Nickelodeon revival)	Stella's Guardian of Sirenix, Diana		
2012–14	Ben 10: Omniverse	Young Ben Tennyson, Pakmar, Attea, Ben 23, Albedo (young), Molly Gunther, Swift, Lucy Mann, Pesky Dust, Diamondhead (Gwen), Upgrade (young), Duffy, She-Worst		
2012–14	Brickleberry	Amber		
2012–17	Ultimate Spider-Man	Mary Jane Watson, Thundra, Sandy	Nominated – BTVA Voice Acting Award for Best Female Vocal Performance in a Television Series in a Supporting Role – Action/Drama, 2012, Mary Jane Watson	
2013	Xiaolin Chronicles	Omi, Ping Pong, Muffin Face, Tiny Slim and Moonata	Nominated – BTVA Voice Acting Award for Best Female Lead Vocal Performance in a Television Series – Action/Drama, 2013, Omi	
2013	Futurama	Tanya	Episode: "Stench and Stenchibility"; Grouped under "Guest Starring"	
2013	Beware the Batman	Barbara Gordon, Marcie Brown		
2013	Uncle Grandpa	Sandy, others		
2013–18	Bravest Warriors	Plum	Web series	
2013–20	My Little Pony: Equestria Girls	Twilight Sparkle		
2013–present	Teen Titans Go!	Raven, Herself, Jayna, Batgirl, others	Nominated – BTVA Voice Acting Award for Best Female Lead Vocal Performance in a Television Series – Comedy/Musical, 2013, Raven; Nominated – BTVA Voice Acting Award for Best Female Vocal Performance in a Television Series in a Guest Role – Comedy/Musical, 2013, Jayna	
2014	Wander Over Yonder	Beeza, others		
2014	TripTank	Various		
2014–15	Breadwinners	Zoona	2 episodes	
2015	Hulk and the Agents of S.M.A.S.H.	Betts	Episode: "Days of Future Smash: The Tomorrow Smashers"	
2015	Justice League: Gods and Monsters Chronicles	Harlequin, Brainiac	Web series	
2015	Golan the Insatiable	Mackenzie B.	Season 2	
2015	Fresh Beat Band of Spies	Squee Z. Dumpkins	Episode: "Cute Crook"	
2015	DC Super Hero Girls	Harley Quinn, Poison Ivy, Raven		
2015–16	Turbo Fast	Various		
2015–17	Rick and Morty	Various	Grouped under "Starring"	
2015–18	Inspector Gadget	Penny, others	Netflix series	
2015–19	Guardians of the Galaxy	Irani Rael, young Adam Warlock, additional voices		
2016	The 7D	Tooth Fairy	Episode: "Smarty Tooth"	
2016–21	Ben 10	Ben Tennyson, Glitch, Charmcaster, Sunny, various voices		
2016–17	Justice League Action	Harley Quinn, young Batman, Ember, Lois Lane		
2017	Bunsen Is a Beast	Timmy Turner, Shopper, The Tooth Fairy		Episodes: "Tooth or Consequences" and "Beast of Friends"
2017–19	Avengers Assemble	Typhoid Mary		
2017–20	Unikitty!	Unikitty		
2017–23	Puppy Dog Pals	Chloe's Mom, Various Voices		
2018	Marvel Rising: Initiation	Mary Jane Watson	Television film	
2018	DuckTales	Briar	Episode: "The Missing Links of Moorshire!"	
2018	Skylanders Academy	Coco Bandicoot	Season 3	
2018	OK K.O.! Let's Be Heroes	Raven, Ben Tennyson, Ilana	Episode: "Crossover Nexus"	
2018	Stretch Armstrong and the Flex Fighters	Anastasia	Episode: "Biomass"	
2018–19	The Adventures of Rocky and Bullwinkle	Rocky the Flying Squirrel		
2018–22	Woody Woodpecker	Winnie Woodpecker, Splinter, Wendy Walrus, Veronica Buzzard		
2019	My Little Pony: Rainbow Roadtrip	Twilight Sparkle	Television special	
2019	Marvel Rising: Chasing Ghosts	Mary Jane Watson	Special	
2019	Marvel Rising: Battle of the Bands	Mary Jane Watson, Screaming Mimi	Special	
2019	DreamWorks Dragons: Rescue Riders	Vizza, Sparkle		
2019–21	DC Super Hero Girls	Batgirl, Harley Quinn, Cheetah, Ursa		
2020	Powerbirds	Polly		
2020–21	My Little Pony: Pony Life	Twilight Sparkle		'
2020–present	The Loud House	Maddie		
2021	Kid Cosmic	Agent Blue		
2021	The Ghost and Molly McGee	Aunt Meg, Joshua	Episode: "Mazel Tov, Libby!"	
2021–present	Gabby's Dollhouse	Mama Box, Kitty Fairy		
2022	My Little Pony: Make Your Mark	Twilight Sparkle	2 episodes; uncredited	
2022	Team Zenko Go	Dr. Greenlittle	Episode: "Harmony Harbor Holiday Surprise"	
2023–26	Rugrats (2021)	Dil Pickles		
2025	Atlantis Rocks	Cora	Web series	
2025	Jellystone!	Bubbles, Truffles	Episode: "Crisis on Infinite Mirths"	
2025	Wylde Pak	Sunny Pearson		
2026	Stitch & Angel's Perfect Summer Day	Angel	Web short; uncredited	
2026	How Not to Draw	Angel	Short-form web and TV series; episode: "Angel Cartoon Comes to Life!"; uncredited	

=== Feature films ===
List of voice performances in feature films
Year	Title	Role	Notes	Source
1998	The Rugrats Movie	Dil Pickles	Credited as Tara Charendoff	
1999	Princess Mononoke	Kaya	English dub	
2000	Rugrats in Paris	Dil Pickles		
2000	The Little Mermaid II: Return to the Sea	Melody		
2002	Ice Age	Roshan, Start		
2002	The Powerpuff Girls Movie	Bubbles		
2002	Spirited Away	Boh (Baby)	English dub	
2002	The Wild Thornberrys Movie	Schoolgirl		
2003	Rugrats Go Wild	Dil Pickles		
2003	The Animatrix	Crew Woman, Nurse, Misha		
2005	Hoodwinked!	Zorra		
2007	TMNT	Additional Voices		
2008	Bolt	Additional Voices		
2012	Strange Frame: Love & Sax	Naia X.	Film festival release	
2012	Ted	Ted's "I Love You" Function	Uncredited	
2013	Monsters University	Brynn Larson, Additional Voices		
2013	Jay & Silent Bob's Super Groovy Cartoon Movie!	Cocknocker, Small Fry the Science Guy	Film festival release	
2013	My Little Pony: Equestria Girls	Twilight Sparkle	Nominated (Won People's Choice) – 3rd annual BTVA Voice Acting Awards – Best Female Vocal Performance in a TV Special/Direct-to-DVD Title or Theatrical Short; Limited theatrical release	
2014	My Little Pony: Equestria Girls – Rainbow Rocks	Twilight Sparkle	Grouped under "Featured Voice Performers"; Limited theatrical release	
2014	The Hero of Color City	Yellow (Singing Voice)	Limited release	
2014	Yellowbird	Lisa	Limited theatrical release	
2015	Ted 2	Ted's "I Love You" Function		
2015	Minions	Binky Nelson, Additional Voices		
2016	Only Yesterday	Naoko	English dub Limited theatrical release	
2016	The Secret Life of Pets	Sweetpea, Additional Voices		
2016	Sing	Becky, Nancy and Additional Voices		
2017	The Boss Baby	Additional Voices		
2017	Smurfs: The Lost Village	Additional Voices		
2017	Despicable Me 3	Additional Voices		
2017	The Emoji Movie	Additional Voices		
2017	Animal Crackers	Talia		
2017	My Little Pony: The Movie	Twilight Sparkle		
2018	Hotel Transylvania 3: Summer Vacation	Frankenlady		
2018	Teen Titans Go! To the Movies	Raven		
2018	The Grinch	Additional Voices		
2019	The Secret Life of Pets 2	Sweetpea, Pickles, Baby Liam, Additional voices		
2019	Star Wars: The Rise of Skywalker	Additional Voices		
2021	Sing 2	Additional Voices		
2023	Guardians of the Galaxy Vol. 3	Mainframe	Replacing Miley Cyrus	
2024	Despicable Me 4	Gru Jr.		
2025
2025	Gabby's Dollhouse: The Movie	Kitty Fairy		
2025	Magnetosphere	Captain Cassiopeia		
2026	Avengers: Endgame	Miss Minutes (voice)	Uncredited; extended version	
2026	Avengers: Doomsday	Miss Minutes (voice)	Post-production	

=== Direct-to-video and television films ===
List of voice performances in direct-to-video and television films
Year	Title	Role	Notes	Source
1988	The Wild Puffalumps	Holly		
1988	Care Bears Nutcracker Suite	Anna	Grouped under "Cast"	
1997	The Ugly Duckling	Scruffy	English dub Uncredited	
1998	Scooby-Doo on Zombie Island	Lena		
1999	Can of Worms	Lula		
1999	Black Mask	Yeuk-Lan		
2000	The Little Mermaid II: Return to the Sea	Melody	Nominated – Annie Award for Voice Acting by a Female Performer in an Animated Feature Production, 29th Annie Awards	
2000	Batman Beyond: Return of the Joker	Batgirl		
2002	Tom and Jerry: The Magic Ring	Nibbles		
2002	Tarzan & Jane	Hazel		
2003	The Wacky Adventures of Ronald McDonald: The Monster o' McDonaldland Loch	Girl, Boy, Sheep		
2003	101 Dalmatians II: Patch's London Adventure	Two-Tone		
2003	The Fairly Oddparents: Abra-Catastrophe	Timmy Turner		
2003	Batman: Mystery of the Batwoman	Barbara Gordon		
2004	Van Helsing: The London Assignment	Young Victoria		
2004	Channel Chasers	Timmy Turner, Paula Poundcake, Additional Voices		
2004–06	Jimmy Timmy Power Hour	Timmy Turner, School Girl		
2005	Dinotopia: Quest for the Ruby Sunstone	Mara		
2005	The Fairly Oddparents: School's Out: The Musical	Timmy Turner, Baby Flappy		
2005	The Proud Family Movie	Bebe & Cece Proud, Cashew		
2005	Stuart Little 3: Call of the Wild	Brooke, Forest Animals, Scouts		
2005	The Legend of Frosty the Snowman	Sarah Simple, Sonny Sklarew		
2005	The Batman vs. Dracula	Vicky Vale		
2005	Kim Possible: So the Drama	Computer Voice		
2006	Bratz Genie Magic	Katia		
2006	Fairy Idol	Timmy, Timmy Clone, Blonda, Supermodel		
2006	Leroy & Stitch	Angel, Additional Voices		
2006	Teen Titans: Trouble in Tokyo	Raven, Computer Voice		
2006	Bah, Humduck! A Looney Tunes Christmas	Priscilla Pig, House Mother		
2007	Ben 10: Secret of the Omnitrix	Ben Tennyson		
2007	Doctor Strange: The Sorcerer Supreme	April Strange		
2007	Disney Princess Enchanted Tales: Follow Your Dreams	Sharma		
2007	Tom and Jerry: A Nutcracker Tale	La Petite Ballerina		
2007	Pooh's Super Sleuth Christmas Movie	Vixen		
2008	Unstable Fables: 3 Pigs and a Baby	Teen Girl Wolf, Construction Cow, Popular Girl		
2008	The Little Mermaid: Ariel's Beginning	Adella, Andrina		
2008	Wubbzy's Big Movie!	Additional Voices		
2008	Secrets of the Furious Five	Young Tigress		
2009	The Powerpuff Girls Rule!	Bubbles, Alarm System	10th anniversary special	
2009	Wonder Woman	Alexa		
2009	Wow! Wow! Wubbzy!: Wubb Idol	Daizy, Shimmer, Info Booth Woman, Arcade Girl, Kool Kid #3		
2010	The Drawn Together Movie: The Movie!	Princess Clara, Toot Braunstein, others		
2010	Scooby-Doo! Camp Scare	Trudy		
2010	Superman/Batman: Apocalypse	Lashina, Female Radio Caller #2		
2011	Thor: Tales of Asgard	Sif		
2011	A Fairly Odd Movie: Grow Up, Timmy Turner!	Poof		
2011	Twinkle Toes	Brittany Fairlawn, Mrs. Hubble, Mrs. Saperstein, Sarah		
2011	DC Showcase: Catwoman	Buttermilk Skye		
2012	Bratz: Desert Jewelz	Katia		
2012	Back to the Sea	Sammy		
2012	Ben 10: Destroy All Aliens	Ben Tennyson, Upgrade, Sandra, Computer Voice		
2012	Superman vs. The Elite	Young Vera Black		
2012	Robot Chicken DC Comics Special	Harley Quinn, Selena Gomez	Grouped under "Starring"	
2012	Dear Dracula	Nicole, Hot Dog		
2012	A Fairly Odd Christmas	Poof		
2012	Delhi Safari	Yuvi, Baby Leopard		
2012	Dino Time	Julia		
2013	Batman: The Dark Knight Returns	Michelle		
2013	Scooby-Doo! Mask of the Blue Falcon	Austin, Princess Garogflotach		
2013	Scooby-Doo! Stage Fright	News Anchor, Donna		
2013	Toy Story of Terror!	Computer		
2014	Powerpuff Girls: Dance Pantsed	Bubbles		
2014	Robot Chicken DC Comics Special 2: Villains in Paradise	Harley Quinn	Grouped under "Starring"	
2014	A Fairly Odd Summer	Poof	Uncredited	
2015	My Little Pony: Equestria Girls – Friendship Games	Twilight Sparkle / Midnight Sparkle	Nominated (Won People's Choice) – 5th annual BTVA Voice Acting Awards – Best Female Vocal Performance in a TV Special/Direct-to-DVD Title or Theatrical Short	
2016	Batman: The Killing Joke	Barbara Gordon / Batgirl		
2016	Lego DC Comics Super Heroes: Justice League – Gotham City Breakout	Harley Quinn		
2016	DC Super Hero Girls: Hero of the Year	Harley Quinn, Poison Ivy		
2016	My Little Pony: Equestria Girls – Legend of Everfree	Twilight Sparkle / Midnight Sparkle	Netflix premiere	
2017	DC Super Hero Girls: Intergalactic Games	Harley Quinn, Poison Ivy		
2017	Lego DC Super Hero Girls: Brain Drain	Harley Quinn		
2018	Scooby-Doo! & Batman: The Brave and the Bold	Harley Quinn, Poison Ivy		
2018	Suicide Squad: Hell to Pay	Harley Quinn		
2018	Batman Ninja	Harley Quinn, Poison Ivy	English dub	
2018	Gnome Alone	Catherine	Netflix film	
2018	My Little Pony: Equestria Girls – Forgotten Friendship	Twilight Sparkle		
2018	Batman: Gotham by Gaslight	Marlene		
2018	My Little Pony: Equestria Girls – Rollercoaster of Friendship	Twilight Sparkle		
2018	DC Super Hero Girls: Legends of Atlantis	Raven, Harley Quinn, Poison Ivy		
2019	Justice League vs. the Fatal Five	Saturn Girl		
2019	My Little Pony: Equestria Girls – Spring Breakdown	Twilight Sparkle, Princess Twilight Sparkle		
2019	Batman vs. Teenage Mutant Ninja Turtles	Harley Quinn, Poison Ivy		
2019	Batman: Hush	Reporter		
2019	My Little Pony: Rainbow Roadtrip	Twilight Sparkle		
2019	Teen Titans Go! vs. Teen Titans	Raven		
2019	My Little Pony: Equestria Girls – Sunset's Backstage Pass	Twilight Sparkle		
2019	My Little Pony: Equestria Girls – Holidays Unwrapped	Twilight Sparkle		
2020	Superman: Red Son	Young Superman		
2021	Teen Titans Go! See Space Jam	Raven		
2021	My Little Pony: A New Generation	Twilight Sparkle	Cameo appearance Direct-to-digital film	
2022	Teen Titans Go! & DC Super Hero Girls: Mayhem in the Multiverse	Raven, Batgirl, Harley Quinn		
2023	Scooby-Doo! and Krypto, Too!	Lois Lane, Harley Quinn, Helen		

=== Video games ===
List of voice performances in video games
Year	Title	Role	Notes	Source
1998	The Rugrats Movie Activity Challenge	Dil Pickles		
1998	Redneck Rampage Rides Again	Daisy Mae		
1999	Rugrats: Studio Tour	Dil Pickles		
2000	Icewind Dale	Yxunomei, Child Yxunomei, Additional Voices		
2000	Orphen: Scion of Sorcery	Mar		
2000	Rugrats in Paris: The Movie: The Video Game	Dil Pickles		
2000	Sacrifice	Voice Over Actors		
2000	Vampire: The Masquerade – Redemption	Voice Actors		
2001	The Powerpuff Girls: Chemical X-Traction	Bubbles		
2001	Batman: Vengeance	Batgirl		
2001	Rugrats: All Growed Up – Older and Bolder	Dil Pickles		
2001	Final Fantasy X	Rikku		
2001	Tony Hawk's Pro Skater 3	Additional Voices		
2002	Pirates: The Legend of Black Kat	Mara de Leon		
2002	The Powerpuff Girls: Relish Rampage	Bubbles, Female Child #1, Female Citizen #1		
2002	Whacked!	Charity, Lucy		
2002	Tony Hawk's Pro Skater 4	Additional Voices		
2003	Batman: Rise of Sin Tzu	Barbara Gordon / Batgirl		
2003	Nickelodeon Toon Twister 3-D	Timmy Turner		
2003	The Fairly OddParents: Breakin' da Rules	Timmy Turner		
2003	Final Fantasy X-2	Rikku	2004 Interactive Achievement Award for Outstanding Achievement in Character Performance – Female	
2004	Ninja Gaiden	Rachel	Also Sigma	
2004	Tribes: Vengeance	Julia		
2004	La Pucelle: Tactics	Chocolat & Goddess Poitreene		
2004	Shrek 2	Lil' Red, Fairy		
2004	Tales of Symphonia	Presea Combatir, Corrine		
2004	The Fairly OddParents: Shadow Showdown	Timmy Turner		
2004	Nicktoons Movin'	Timmy Turner		
2004	Hot Shots Golf Fore!	Voice Cast		
2004	Robotech: Invasion	Guppy		
2004	Spyro: A Hero's Tail	Ember, Flame, Blink		
2004	Jak 3	Keira Hagai, Seem		
2005	Xenosaga Episode II: Jenseits von Gut und Böse	Sakura Mizrahi		
2005	Psychonauts	Sheegor		
2005	Killer7	Kaede Smith		
2005	X-Men Legends II: Rise of Apocalypse	Blink		
2005	Jak X: Combat Racing	Keira Hagai		
2005	Shrek SuperSlam	Red Riding Hood, Anthrax, Dronkey, Luna		
2005	Nicktoons Unite!	Timmy Turner		
2005	Viewtiful Joe: Red Hot Rumble	Captain Blue Jr.		
2006	Kingdom Hearts II	Rikku		
2006	Teen Titans	Raven		
2006	Nicktoons: Battle for Volcano Island	Timmy Turner		
2006	Shrek Smash n' Crash Racing	Red Riding Hood, Goldilocks		
2006	Xiaolin Showdown	Omi		
2006	Cartoon Network Racing	Bubbles		
2006	Metal Gear Solid: Portable Ops	Ursula, Elisa		
2007	Gurumin: A Monstrous Adventure	Cream, Mosby, Baby Tokaron		
2007	Blue Dragon	Kluke		
2007	Nicktoons: Attack of the Toybots	Timmy Turner		
2007	Ratchet & Clank Future: Tools of Destruction	Talwyn Apogee		
2007	Ben 10: Protector of Earth	Ben Tennyson		
2008	Lost Odyssey	Seth Balmore		
2008	Ninja Gaiden 2	Rachel, Sanji	Also Ninja Gaiden Sigma 2	
2008	Ratchet & Clank Future: Quest for Booty	Talwyn Apogee	Grouped under "Voice-Over Actors"	
2008	Crash: Mind over Mutant	Voice Cast		
2009	Watchmen: The End Is Nigh	Voice-Over Actors		
2009	Ice Age: Dawn of the Dinosaurs	Supporting Voice Cast		
2009	Fat Princess	Princess, Female Army Member		
2009	Jak and Daxter: The Lost Frontier	Keira Hagai		
2009	Cartoon Network Universe: FusionFall	Bubbles, Princess Ilana		
2009	Cars Race-O-Rama	Candace		
2009	Marvel Super Hero Squad	Invisible Woman		
2010	No More Heroes 2: Desperate Struggle	Cloe Walsh, Margaret Moonlight		
2010	Metal Gear Solid: Peace Walker	Paz Ortega Andrade		
2010	Clash of the Titans	Marmara, Tekla, Townspeople		
2010	Spider-Man: Shattered Dimensions	Doctor Octopus 2099		
2010	Marvel Super Hero Squad: The Infinity Gauntlet	Scarlet Witch, Invisible Woman, H.E.R.B.I.E.		
2010	Shrek Forever After	Witches	Grouped under "Additional Voice Talent"	
2011	Marvel vs. Capcom 3: Fate of Two Worlds	X-23	Grouped under "Voice Talent", also Ultimate	
2011	Rango	Priscilla		
2011	Shadows of the Damned	Justine		
2011	Marvel Super Hero Squad: Comic Combat	Scarlet Witch, Invisible Woman		
2011	Cartoon Network: Punch Time Explosion	Bubbles, Buttercup, Chowder, Dexter, Cheese, Young Ben Tennyson	Grouped under "Featuring the Voice Talents Of"	
2011	Rage	Elizabeth, Friday	Uncredited; Grouped under "Voice Talent"	
2011	Spider-Man: Edge of Time	Menace		
2011	Batman: Arkham City	Harley Quinn	Nominated – BTVA Voice Acting Award for Best Female Vocal Performance in a Video Game, 2011	
2011	Batman: Arkham City Lockdown	Harley Quinn	Grouped under "Voice Over Actors"	
2011	Star Wars: The Old Republic	Risha, Holliday		
2012	Asura's Wrath	Durga		
2012	Armored Core V	Francis "Fran" Batty Curtis, Angie, Computer Voice #1		
2012	Lollipop Chainsaw	Juliet Starling	Nominated – BTVA Voice Acting Award for Best Female Vocal Performance in a Video Game, 2012	
2012	Guild Wars 2	Scarlet Briar		
2012	Skylanders: Giants	Flashwing, Additional Voices	Grouped under "Voice Cast"	
2012	Marvel Super Hero Squad Online	Scarlet Witch		
2012	Ben 10 Omniverse: The Game	Young Ben Tennyson, Pakmar		
2012	PlayStation All-Stars Battle Royale	Fat Princess		
2013	Injustice: Gods Among Us	Harley Quinn, Raven	Grouped under "Voice Talent"	
2013	The Wonderful 101	Wonder-Pink	Nominated – BTVA Voice Acting Award for Best Female Vocal Performance in a Video Game, 2013	
2013	Armored Core: Verdict Day	CPU Voice	Grouped under "CAST LIST"	
2013	Skylanders: Swap Force	Flashwing	Grouped under "Voice Actors"	
2013	Lego Marvel Super Heroes	VO Talent		
2013	Batman: Arkham Origins	Harley Quinn	Grouped under "Voiceover Talent"	
2013–16	Marvel Heroes	Squirrel Girl, Moira MacTaggert, Dagger, X-23, Magik, Jessica Jones, Mary Jane Watson		
2014	Metal Gear Solid V: Ground Zeroes	Paz Ortega Andrade	Also facial motion capture	
2014	The Elder Scrolls Online	Additional Voices	Grouped under "English Voices"	
2014	WildStar	Aurin Female		
2014	Skylanders: Trap Team	Flashwing	Grouped under "Voice Actors"	
2014	Spider-Man Unlimited	Mary Jane Watson, Felicia Hardy / Black Cat		
2014	Lego Batman 3: Beyond Gotham	Harley Quinn, Poison Ivy, Cheshire, Stargirl	Grouped under "Voice Talent"	
2014	LittleBigPlanet 3	Coach Rock, Vera Oblonsky		
2014	Disney Infinity 2.0: Marvel Super Heroes	Black Cat	Grouped under "Featuring the Voice Talents"	
2015	Infinite Crisis	Harley Quinn		
2015	Mortal Kombat X	Ferra, Li Mei	Grouped under "English Voice Talent"	
2015	Batman: Arkham Knight	Harley Quinn		
2015	Disney Infinity 3.0	Felicia Hardy / Black Cat		
2015	Metal Gear Solid V: The Phantom Pain	Paz Ortega Andrade	Also facial capture	
2015	Skylanders: SuperChargers	Flashwing	Grouped under "Voice Actors"	
2015–17	Lego Dimensions	Harley Quinn, Gail the Construction Worker, Raven, Jayna, Harley Quinn (The Lego Batman Movie)		
2016	Lego Marvel's Avengers	Jessica Jones	Roles not listed in closing credits	
2016	Batman: Arkham Underworld	Harley Quinn		
2016	Teeny Titans	Raven		
2016	View-Master Batman Animated VR	Batgirl		
2016	World of Final Fantasy	Rikku		
2017	Injustice 2	Harley Quinn		
2018	Them's Fightin' Herds	Arizona		
2018	Lego DC Super-Villains	Harley Quinn, Batgirl, Raven		
2019	Marvel Ultimate Alliance 3: The Black Order	Jessica Jones		
2019	Dark Deception	Penny the Chicken and Reaper Nurses		
2020	Samurai Jack: Battle Through Time	Ashi, Computer		
2021	DC Super Hero Girls: Teen Power	Batgirl, Harley Quinn		
2022	Nickelodeon Extreme Tennis	Timmy Turner		
2022	MultiVersus	Harley Quinn, Bubbles, Raven		
2022	High on Life	Additional Voices		
2023	Disney Speedstorm	Angel	Grouped under "Featuring the Voice Talents of"	
2023	Nickelodeon All-Star Brawl 2	Ember McLain		
2024	Suicide Squad: Kill the Justice League	Harley Quinn		
2024	Batman: Arkham Shadow	Dr. Harleen Quinzel		
2025	Rusty Rabbit	Eliza		
2025	Nicktoons & The Dice of Destiny	Timmy Turner, Ember McLain		

=== Live-action ===
List of acting performances in film and television
Year	Title	Role	Notes	Source
1988	T. and T.	Sydney	Episode: "Junkyard Blues"	
1989	Mosquito Lake	Tara Harrison	Credited as Tara Charendoff	
1991	Married to It	Student in Pageant	Credited as Tara Charendoff	
1991	Street Legal	Angela	Episode: "Sing for Me, Olivia"	
1992	Forever Knight	Publicist	Episode: "Dying for Fame"	
1992	A Town Torn Apart	Vida Sparrows	Television film	
1992	The Judge	Millie Waters	Episode: "The Wild Thing"	
1993	Family Pictures	Sarah (17–30)	Television film Credited as Tara Charendoff	
1993	Kung Fu: The Legend Continues	Elizabeth	Episode: "Secret Place"	
1993	Desiree's Wish	Waitress	Short film	
1993	Ready or Not	Nicole	Episode: "Black or White or Maybe Grey"	
1994	Thicker Than Blood: The Larry McLinden Story	Terra (age 16)		
1994	Party of Five	Lorna	Episode: "Homework"	
1994	Reform School Girl	Lucille	Film from Rebel Highway anthology series	
1995	National Lampoon's Senior Trip	Carla Morgan		
1995	Skin Deep	Tina		
1996	3rd Rock from the Sun	Exercise Lady VO	Episode: "My Mother the Alien"	
1998	Sabrina Goes to Rome	Gwen	Television film Credited as Tara Chareandoff	
1998	Sabrina the Teenage Witch	Molly Dolly	Episode: "Good Will Haunting"	
1999	Sabrina Down Under	Gwen	Television film Credited as Tara Charendoff	
1999	1999 Kids' Choice Awards	Announcer	(Note: Strong has listed on her own website that she was the announcer for the 1999 Kids' Choice Awards, with audio clips of her work. In some interviews and media, she is listed as an announcer for the 2000 Kids' Choice Awards.)	
1999	Touched by an Angel	Emily	Episode: "The Occupant"	
2004	Comic Book: The Movie	Hotel Maid		
2006	Take Home Chef	Herself	Episode: "Tara S."	
2007–08	According to Jim	Crying Baby, Crying Babies	2 episodes	
2008	The Last White Dishwasher	Tamara Swanson	Short film	
2010–11	Big Time Rush	Miss Collins	5 episodes	
2012	Bronies: The Extremely Unexpected Adult Fans of My Little Pony	Herself	Documentary; Also producer	
2013	Super Fun Night	Young Pamela	Episode: "Merry Super Fun Christmas"	
2013	Police Guys	Walkie Voice	Short film	
2013	I Know That Voice	Herself	Documentary	
2014	Arrow	Deranged Squad Female	Episode: "Suicide Squad"	
2017–19	A Series of Unfortunate Events	Sunny Baudelaire (voice)	11 episodes	
2019	Star Wars: The Rise of Skywalker	Additional voices		
2021	Pretty Hard Cases	Tiggy Sullivan	10 episodes	
2021–23	Loki	Miss Minutes (voice)	5 episodes	
2023	Guardians of the Galaxy Vol. 3	Mainframe (voice)	Replacing Miley Cyrus	
2024	The Rookie	Mrs. Lane	Episode: "Crushed"	
2025	Gabby's Dollhouse: The Movie	Kitty Fairy (voice)		
2025	Wicked: For Good	Dorothy Gale (voice)		
2026	Avengers Endgame: Encore	Miss Minutes (voice)		
2026	Avengers: Doomsday	Miss Minutes (voice)	Post-production	
