= List of Xiaolin Showdown episodes =

Xiaolin Showdown is an American animated television series created by Christy Hui for Kids' WB, a programming block on The WB that aired on Saturday mornings and weekday afternoons. Premiering on November 1, 2003, the series ran for three seasons until its series finale aired on May 13, 2006, in the United States. The episodes are listed in order of their production number with the date that they originally aired on Kids' WB.

== Series overview ==
| Season | Episodes | Originally released | |
| Season | Episodes | First released | Last released |
|---|---|---|---|
| 1 | 13 | November 1, 2003 | May 15, 2004 |
| 2 | 26 | September 11, 2004 | May 21, 2005 |
| 3 | 13 | September 17, 2005 | May 13, 2006 |

== Episodes ==
=== Season 1 (2003–04) ===
| No. overall | No. in season | Title | Directed by | Written by | Original release date | Prod. code | K9–14 viewers (in millions) | Rating/share |
|---|---|---|---|---|---|---|---|---|
| 1 | 1 | "The Journey of a Thousand Miles" | Steven Lyons | Bill Motz & Bob Roth | November 1, 2003 | 257–301 | 0.85 | 3.3/11 (2-11) (Note: with kids aged 2-11. This episode also received: a 4.1/13 share with boys 2–5; a 2.5/9 share with girls 2–5) |
Over 1,500 years ago, the forces of good and evil fought over ownership of the mystical Shen Gong Wu. The battle ended when the evil Heylin witch Wuya was trapped inside a puzzle box. In the present day, Jack Spicer receives this box as a present from his parents who are on a trip to Hong Kong. Meanwhile, Omi at the Xiaolin Temple in China must deal with the new recruits Kimiko Tohomiko, Clay Bailey, and Raimundo Pedrosa. When the first Shen Gong Wu reveals itself, the Xiaolin and Heylin forces first meet, leading up to the first Xiaolin Showdown.
| 2 | 2 | "Like a Rock!" | Steven Lyons | Bill Motz & Bob Roth | November 8, 2003 | 257–302 | 1.15 | N/A |
Clay gets mocked because of his slow and steady style, but on a trip to the French countryside to retrieve the Fist of Tebigong, the team comes across the magic of Le Mime who has joined Jack Spicer. His magical actions leave Omi, Kimiko and Raimundo trapped in an invisible box, leaving Clay on his own when it comes to his first-ever Xiaolin Showdown against Jack Spicer.
| 3 | 3 | "Tangled Web" | Steven Lyons | Madellaine Paxson | November 15, 2003 | 257–303 | 1.30 | N/A |
After losing a Xiaolin Showdown to Jack Spicer for the Monkey Staff, Kimiko's short temper is brought to the attention of the other Chosen Ones. When she finds a new Shen Gong Wu, the Tangle Web Comb, that requires total focus from its user, she must learn to control her temper to use it in a Xiaolin Showdown, or risk losing more Shen Gong Wu again.
| 4 | 4 | "Katnappe!" | Steven Lyons | Amy Wolfram | November 22, 2003 | 257–304 | N/A | N/A |
Jack and Wuya meet the cat-themed villainess Katnappé, and she joins them in their quest for the Shen Gong Wu. When she wins the Golden Tiger Claws in a Xiaolin Showdown against the monks, she steals them from the Heylin and goes on a crime spree. Omi and the others must think of a way to stop someone who can go wherever she wants, whenever she wants.
| 5 | 5 | "Shen Yi Bu" | Tim Eldred | Rob Humphrey & John Behnke | November 29, 2003 | 257–305 | N/A | N/A |
While searching for the Sword of the Storm, Raimundo finds it, but then loses it to Jack and Wuya's latest accomplice, the excessively fat, yet agile ninja Tubbimura because of Raimundo's lack of knowledge of the Shen Gong Wu. He becomes overly studious to outsmart Tubbimura in their next encounter, in which he invokes the Shen Yi Bu Dare, a type of Xiaolin Showdown where two Shen Gong Wu are wagered on each side.
| 6 | 6 | "Chameleon" | Dan Riba | Ray DeLaurentis | December 6, 2003 | 257–306 | 1.18 | N/A |
Jack kidnaps Kimiko and sends in his Chameleon-Bot in her place to steal the Shen Gong Wu right under the Xiaolin Warriors' noses. Omi, however, almost immediately senses that something's wrong with Kimiko, and it is not long until the Xiaolin Warriors discover the truth.
| 7 | 7 | "Ring of the Nine Dragons" | Steven Lyons | Mark Palmer | January 17, 2004 | 257–307 | N/A | N/A |
Omi tries to learn how to multitask just when the Xiaolin Warriors find the Ring of the Nine Dragons, a Shen Gong Wu that allows its user to divide himself into a maximum of 9 separate people. When Omi uses it against Master Fung's warning, he is divided into three and then five separate people, each with a different part of his personality, and a portion of his strength and intelligence. Now he must defeat Jack as a fraction of himself when they both find the Falcon's Eye.
| 8 | 8 | "Night of the Sapphire Dragon" | Tim Eldred | Brian Swenlin | January 24, 2004 | 257–308 | 1.04 | N/A |
The Xiaolin Monks and Jack Spicer find a strange black dragon Shen Gong Wu in an active volcano. When the Xiaolin Monks win it in a Xiaolin Showdown, they bring it back to the temple, not knowing what it is. When Kimiko removes a layer of soot, it is revealed that it is the Sapphire Dragon, a Shen Gong Wu that turns everything and everyone into sapphire statues which it can control. When it is accidentally activated, it starts taking the Xiaolin Warriors and elder monks out one by one. It's up to Dojo to save the day.
| 9 | 9 | "My Homey Omi" | Dan Riba | Steven Darancette | February 7, 2004 | 257–309 | N/A | N/A |
The monks head to New York City to find the Serpent's Tail, a living Shen Gong Wu that is forever on the move in the tunnels underneath the city. When Omi gets lost in the big city, he meets up with a streetwise kid named Jermaine. When the two new friends find the Serpent's Tail and Jack Spicer, he challenges Omi to a Xiaolin Showdown. Omi and Jermaine have to team up to take down Spicer and his giant robot in a two-on-two Shen Yi Bu Dare game of basketball.
| 10 | 10 | "Big as Texas" | Steven Lyons | Brandon Sawyer | February 14, 2004 | 257–310 | 0.94 | 4.6/18 (6–11) (Note: with kids aged 6–11.) |
Clay's father visits the Xiaolin Temple and decides Clay can no longer be a Xiaolin Monk because of his actions in losing the Orb of Tornami. When Dojo realizes that Clay's father had the Star Hanabi all along, the team are off to Texas to make sure that the Star Hanabi does not fall in the wrong hands. When the Star Hanabi activates, Clay must prove himself to his father while competing with Jack Spicer in a Xiaolin Showdown.
| 11 | 11 | "Royal Rumble" | Tim Eldred | Eddie Guzelian | May 1, 2004 | 257–311 | N/A | N/A |
The Xiaolin Warriors are having trouble working as a team when four Shen Gong Wu activate at the same time; the Lotus Twister, the Longi Kite, the Tongue of Saiping, and the Sun Chi Lantern. Wuya sends Jack Spicer, Tubbimura, Katnappé, and the Chameleon-Bot to find the same Shen Gong Wu. When the Xiaolin Warriors split up, they are nearly all captured. It is up to Omi to save his friends, even if he may be trapped by the Heylin forces in the process.
| 12 | 12 | "Mala Mala Jong" | Dan Riba | Madellaine Paxson | May 8, 2004 | 257–312 | N/A | N/A |
Jack and Wuya recover the Heart of Jong and Wuya uses it to create Mala Mala Jong, an unstoppable demonic warrior consisting of shen gong wu, to wreak havoc on the world. Wuya abandons Jack, and sets her sights on the shen gong wu in the Xiaolin Temple.
| 13 | 13 | "In the Flesh" | Steven Lyons | Bill Motz & Bob Roth | May 15, 2004 | 257–313 | N/A | N/A |
When Raimundo doesn't get promoted to Xiaolin Apprentice level because he disobeyed Fung's orders, Wuya persuades him over to the Heylin side. When the Reversing Mirror reveals itself, Raimundo leaves his friends upon winning the Mirror to join Wuya on the Heylin side. He then steals the Serpent's Tail from the Xiaolin Temple while Omi is grieving as he, Kimiko and Clay see Raimundo flying away as they realize that Raimundo has betrayed them. With this Shen Gong Wu and the Reversing Mirror, Wuya can be restored to full power. The other Xiaolin Warriors must stop Wuya and Raimundo before Wuya can be returned to her physical body.

=== Season 2 (2004–05) ===
Episodes #257–664, #257–665, and #257–666 were premiered in non-production order in USA. Season 2 is divided into 2 seasons in UK.

| No. overall | No. in season | Title | Directed by | Written by | Original release date | Prod. code | K9–14 viewers (in millions) | K6–11 rating/share |
|---|---|---|---|---|---|---|---|---|
| 14 | 1 | "Days Past" | Matt Danner | Bill Motz & Bob Roth | September 11, 2004 | 257–651 | 0.98 | 3.7 |
When Wuya returns to her flesh and blood form, the remaining Xiaolin Apprentices must find a way to defeat her. The only way they know how, is to trap her within a puzzle box. The only way to get one is for Omi to travel to the past and get one from the greatest Xiaolin Dragon ever, Grand Master Dashi, except he does not know how to return.
| 15 | 2 | "Citadel of Doom" | Jeff Allen | Bill Motz & Bob Roth | September 18, 2004 | 257–652 | 1.09 | 3.9 |
With Omi stuck in the past, the remaining Xiaolin Apprentices and Jack must find a way to defeat Wuya, until they are captured by her magic warriors. When Omi does arrive, after having frozen himself with the Orb of Tornami, the puzzle box will not open for Jack Spicer or any of the Xiaolin. Now Raimundo must decide where his loyalties lie.
| 16 | 3 | "The Shard of Lightning" | Mike Milo | Amy Wolfram | September 25, 2004 | 257–653 | 0.81 | 3.2 |
With Wuya trapped in the puzzle box again, the Xiaolin Apprentices train, feeling safe from the threat of evil. When the Shard of Lightning reveals itself, they find Wuya freed and working with Katnappé, and before they can retrieve the Shen Gong Wu, Jack Spicer steals it and uses it to steal the Xiaolin's Shen Gong Wu with his new robot double. When a new Shen Gong Wu reveals itself, the Xiaolin must fight Katnappé, Wuya, and two Jack Spicers.
| 17 | 4 | "The Crystal Glasses" | Matt Danner | Brian Swenlin | October 2, 2004 | 257–654 | 0.89 | 3.5 |
When the Crystal Glasses reveal themselves in Russia, the Xiaolin are assisted by a street vendor named Vlad. They bring Vlad back to the Xiaolin Temple to train with them, but when Omi uses the Crystal Glasses to see his future, he is tricked into believing he will be the new evil. When an entire cave of Shen Gong Wu reveal themselves at once, the Xiaolin find Vlad on the side of the Heylin, and Omi must challenge him to a Xiaolin Showdown.
| 18 | 5 | "Pandatown" | Jeff Allen | Brandon Sawyer | October 9, 2004 | 257–655 | N/A | N/A |
A rash of crimes using Shen Gong Wu that the Xiaolin Apprentices think Jack owns leads them to Hong Kong, where they face PandaBubba, who Jack got a loan from using the Shen Gong Wu as collateral. They must challenge PandaBubba to a Xiaolin Showdown to get all the stolen Shen Gong Wu back and to keep him from committing any more crimes with the Shen Gong Wu.
| 19 | 6 | "Sizing Up Omi" | Mike Milo | Steve Cuden | October 30, 2004 | 257–656 | N/A | N/A |
When Wuya starts using a giant Cyclops as her new henchman, the Xiaolin Apprentices are extremely overpowered. Omi does his best to try to get stronger, eventually resorting to using the Changing Chopsticks and the Reversing Mirror to make himself giant. When he fails to get to a Xiaolin Showdown in time to defeat the Cyclops, Clay has lost the Reversing Mirror and Omi uses the Changing Chopsticks on their own, and shrinks to the size of an ant. If the Xiaolin do not get the Reversing Mirror back in time, Omi will be stuck in his shrunken state, forever.
| 20 | 7 | "Enter the Dragon" | Matt Danner | Stephen Sustarsic & David Silverman | November 6, 2004 | 257–657 | N/A | N/A |
Every 1500 years, Dojo is taken over by an extreme urge to collect Shen Gong Wu, and he will destroy anything in his path in his quest to do so. When Omi is left alone to guard Dojo from escaping from a cage, he is tricked into letting him out of his cage and Dojo escapes to wreak havoc on anyone in his way of getting Shen Gong Wu. He eats both the Xiaolin and the Heylin, and they must work together to escape from the evil two-headed Dojo.
| 21 | 8 | "The Sands of Time" | Jeff Allen | Marc Drotman & Eric Molina | November 13, 2004 | 257–658 | N/A | N/A |
The Xiaolin warriors get a warning from Omi's future self to get the Sands of Time, but when Jack Spicer gets it first, he collects all the most evil people from the past and himself from the future. He uses his future self's knowledge of the locations of the Shen Gong Wu to beat the Xiaolin before they can get to them. When the Ruby of Ramses reveals itself, the Xiaolin must defeat Jack Spicer and his future self.
| 22 | 9 | "Hear Some Evil, See Some Evil" | Mike Milo | Ray DeLaurentis | November 20, 2004 | 257–659 | N/A | N/A |
When the Mind Reader Conch reveals itself, the Xiaolin discover what they each think of each other, causing unrest among the Chosen Ones. When Jack Spicer raids the Shen Gong Wu vault, the Xiaolin must learn to trust each other again, and defeat Jack in a Xiaolin Showdown over the stolen Shen Gong Wu.
| 23 | 10 | "Dreamscape" | Matt Danner | Mark Zaslove | November 27, 2004 | 257–660 | N/A | N/A |
The Shadow of Fear reveals itself, and Jack Spicer manages to get it first. He dives into the minds of the Xiaolin when they sleep, and finds out their worst nightmares. When he raids the Shen Gong Wu vault, again, Omi is easily scared off as the Shadow of Fear brought his greatest fear to life. The Xiaolin try to retrieve the Shen Gong Wu from Jack Spicer, only to come face-to-face with their darkest nightmares. The Xiaolin must overcome their fears when a new Shen Gong Wu reveals itself and are forced to engage in a sumo battle to decide who will win the Shen Gong Wu.
| 24 | 11 | "Master Monk Guan" | Jeff Allen | Stephen Sustarsic & David Silverman | December 11, 2004 | 257–661 | N/A | N/A |
The Xiaolin meet the tai chi master Master Monk Guan when a new Shen Gong Wu reveals itself. He then brings a downtrodden Dojo to Chase Young, the evil master, in exchange for his fabled Spear of Guan, which he lost to Young many years earlier. When the Xiaolin Monks learn that Chase intends to use Dojo as an ingredient for his Lao-Mang-Long Soup, the Xiaolin Monks head to Chase's lair and try to save Dojo, only to be defeated by Chase Young's creature form: a reptilian creature possessing incredible strength and power who defeats them all with ease. Master Monk Guan then intervenes at the last minute and challenges Young to a battle with the monks and Dojo's freedom at stake. If he wins, they all go home safely but if Guan loses, then they will all be Chase Young's prisoners forever.
| 25 | 12 | "The Evil Within" | Mike Milo | Amy Wolfram | February 5, 2005 | 257–662 | N/A | N/A |
When Kimiko nearly fails in getting the Mosaic Scale, she tries to store it in the vault, only to have it fall and break. She tries to hide it in Clay's belongings, but the evil spirit of mischief Sibini who, upon being freed from the Scale, takes control of Clay's body while he is sleeping and begins causing various acts of mischief. The Xiaolin must now stop Sibini from getting the Monarch Wings, which would give him ultimate power, and may also destroy the world.
| 26 | 13 | "The Deep Freeze" | Matt Danner | Steve Cuden | February 12, 2005 | 257–663 | N/A | N/A |
When the Lunar Locket reveals itself, Jack Spicer uses his Dude-Bot, empowered with the Heart of Jong to retrieve it. When Dude-Bot malfunctions after fighting the Xiaolin Apprentices, he throws the Heart of Jong into a crevasse, and uses the snow around it to become Raksha. Wuya uses Raksha to rule the world, that Raksha turns into a frozen wonderland for himself. The Xiaolin must find a way to defeat Raksha and unfreeze the Earth in the only way they know how: a Xiaolin Showdown.
| 27 | 14 | "Screams of the Siren" | Jeff Allen | Brandon Sawyer | April 16, 2005 | 257–664 | N/A | N/A |
After a Xiaolin Showdown, the Xiaolin Warriors find the mermaid Dyris frozen in ice. After freeing her, she is attacked by a warrior who was also frozen in ice, named Klofange, who Dyris says is trying to destroy all mermaids and she is the last. Jack takes Klofange to his headquarters, and the Xiaolin take Dyris to the temple. When the Xiaolin learn that Dyris is an evil siren who wants to flood the world using underwater volcanoes and rule it, they must defeat her in a Xiaolin Showdown to save the Earth.
| 28 | 15 | "The Black Vipers" | Mike Milo | Brian Swenlin | February 26, 2005 | 257–665 | N/A | N/A |
The Sphere of Yun reveals itself, and the Xiaolin must travel to Texas, where they are confronted by the Black Vipers bike gang, led by Clay's sister Jessie. When Jessie teams up with Jack Spicer, they steal the Xiaolin's Shen Gong Wu, Clay must defeat his sister in a Xiaolin Showdown to get all their Shen Gong Wu back. Jessie must decide to change her ways, or stay evil.
| 29 | 16 | "The Emperor Scorpion Strikes Back" | Matt Danner and Stephen Sandoval | Adam I. Lapidus | February 19, 2005 | 257–666 | N/A | N/A |
Mala Mala Jong returns and four times as powerful as he divided himself into the Fearsome Four using the Ring of the Nine Dragons. This sign of the end of the world can only be ended with the Emperor Scorpion, a Shen Gong Wu that controls other Shen Gong Wu. The Xiaolin must retrieve it before the Fearsome Four destroy everything.
| 30 | 17 | "The Return of PandaBubba" | Jeff Allen | Eric Molina & Marc Drotman | April 23, 2005 | 257–667 | N/A | N/A |
The Xiaolin go to Tokyo to retrieve the Zing-Zom Bone, a Shen Gong Wu that turns people into zombies, but Jack gets to it first. Then, Kimiko learns that her father has been tricked into working with Hong Kong crime boss PandaBubba, and that Jack has given him the Zing-Zom Bone. In order to prevent PandaBubba from turning people into zombies, Kimiko must defeat him in a Xiaolin Showdown.
| 31 | 18 | "The Last Temptation of Raimundo" | Mike Milo | Art Everett | April 23, 2005 | 257–668 | N/A | N/A |
When the Heylin Comet passes by the Earth, the Shen Gong Wu come to life and fuse with Raimundo after he uses some of them to save his town from a volcanic eruption (caused by Jack and Wuya.) As more Shen Gong Wu fuse with him, Raimundo grows bigger and more muscular and gradually begins to be controlled by the Wu until they completely take over his mind. After that, Wuya possesses his body and now the other Xiaolin must save Raimundo from the evil magic of her and the Heylin Comet.
| 32 | 19 | "The Year of the Green Monkey" | Stephen Sandoval | David Silverman & Stephen Sustarsic | April 30, 2005 | 257–669 | N/A | N/A |
When Chase Young decides to help Jack Spicer defeat the Xiaolin Warriors, he uses the Tongue of Saiping and the Monkey Staff to bring forth an army of green monkeys. With the Xiaolin trapped, two Shen Gong Wu reveal themselves that give the user all the knowledge in the world.
| 33 | 20 | "The Demon Seed" | Jeff Allen | Steve Cuden | April 30, 2005 | 257–670 | N/A | N/A |
When the Heylin forces allow the Heylin Seed to grow, the Heylin Plant is brought to life, and the world is in danger. The only way to defeat him is to use the Moonstone Locust, but when the Heylin Plant raids the Xiaolin's vault he mutates the Xiaolin warriors, Jack, and Vlad into plants. Only Raimundo and Omi are left, but during a race to the Moonstone Locust Omi is mutated into a plant leaving Raimundo to get the Moonstone Locust and defeat the Heylin Seed in a Xiaolin Showdown with the fate of the world and that of his friends in the balance.
| 34 | 21 | "The New Order" | Mike Milo | Mark Zaslove | May 7, 2005 | 257–671 | N/A | N/A |
When Jack Spicer and the Cyclops trap Chase Young, Jack attacks the Xiaolin Temple and steals all of the Shen Gong Wu. Omi frees Chase to help them, only for Chase to try to mold him into the evil that he sees in him.
| 35 | 22 | "The Apprentice" | Stephen Sandoval | Ray DeLaurentis | May 7, 2005 | 257–672 | N/A | N/A |
Chase Young is looking for an apprentice. Either Katnappé or Jack will be able to win it. Katnappé has reprogrammed the Warriors' U-bots to be evil. Master Fung informs the Warriors that their new threat is Chase Young, and he must teach the four monks to be deceptive to triumph. However, Omi is too trustworthy. After Chase chooses Katnappé to be his apprentice, Jack turns to the Warriors and asks to join the side of good. Omi trains Jack the best he can to release all the evil that is inside of him, but after Katnappé attacks the Temple, Jack takes off with the Warriors' Wu, which tests Omi's trust.
| 36 | 23 | "Something Jermaine" | Jeff Allen | Stephen Sustarsic | May 14, 2005 | 257–673 | N/A | N/A |
Jermaine arrives at the temple, having attained the level of Wudai Warrior. When Omi learns that Jermaine trained under the evil Chase Young, he must defeat his friend in a Showdown to save him.
| 37 | 24 | "Dangerous Minds" | Mike Milo | Stephen Sustarsic | May 14, 2005 | 257–674 | N/A | N/A |
The Xiaolin travel several miles beneath the Earth's surface to search for a newly-revealed Shen Gong Wu, the Hoduku Mouse. When Jack and his Worm-Bots arrive, the cavern begins to collapse and deadly spiders appear, forcing both sides to retreat. When they both try to retrieve the Hoduku Mouse, they partner up to get rid of the spiders, but this alliance ends when a Xiaolin Showdown is called on the Mouse. When it is destroyed, Omi and Chase Young are split from their respective sides, and Chase brings Omi back to his lair to find a way to defeat the spiders with the knowledge from the Fountain of Hui and the Eagle Scope.
| 38 | 25 | "Judging Omi" | Stephen Sandoval | Stephen Sustarsic & David Silverman | May 21, 2005 | 257–675 | N/A | N/A |
When Master Fung is trapped in the Ying-Yang World by Chase Young who frames Jack Spicer, the only way they can free him is with the Ying Yo-Yo, which they lost to Jack Spicer. Omi is then tricked into going into the Ying-Yang World alone. But when he returns with Master Fung, Omi's appearance and personality change for the worse due to the fact that his good chi has been left in the Ying-Yang World which has Omi turning to the side of evil and working alongside Chase Young.
| 39 | 26 | "Saving Omi" | Jeff Allen | Stephen Sustarsic & David Silverman | May 21, 2005 | 257–676 | N/A | N/A |
With Omi having been turned evil and now on the Heylin side, then Chase restoring Wuya to her human form and Master Fung stuck in a meditative state, the remaining Xiaolin Apprentices must find a way to save their friend and their caretaker before it's too late. The episode ends with Raimundo, Kimiko, Clay and Jack (who now is good after leaving his evil chi in the Ying-Yang World) being forced to flee Chase's lair after realizing that Chase is now more powerful than ever and in control of the world while Raimundo silently grieves for Omi who is unable to leave Chase's side and is mutated into a cat.

=== Season 3 (2005–06) ===
The hour-long finale Time After Time, split into two parts for broadcast, first aired in the United Kingdom on March 14 and 15, in Brazil on April 17 and 18, and later in its original country, USA, on May 6 and 13.

| No. overall | No. in season | Title | Directed by | Written by | Original release date | Prod. code | K6–11 rating/share |
|---|---|---|---|---|---|---|---|
| 40 | 1 | "Finding Omi" | Stephen Sandoval | Stephen Sustarsic | September 17, 2005 | 257–891 | 3.3 (Note: This episode also received 0.93 million viewers with ages 9–14.) |
With Omi still on Chase's side, the others try to figure out how to rescue him without surrendering. Dojo senses a strange presence at the Temple. The translucent character that emerges from the Ying-Yang world is the Chi Creature. They trap the monster in the Sphere of Yun. When Chase, Wuya, and Omi arrive at the temple, Chase releases the Creature with the Serpent's Tail and its drains Master Fung's chi. He tells it to go after Raimundo, Kimiko, and Clay. It drains the chi out of them, leaving Jack and Dojo to get them back. Jack Spicer uses the Ying Yo-Yo, and lures the Creature back into the Ying-Yang World. He uses the Ring of Nine Dragons to make clones of him to hold off the Creature while he picks up the monks' chi and exits with his evil chi back. Dojo takes the chi, the Ring of the Nine Dragons, and the Ying Yo-Yo and traps Jack Spicer in the Sphere of Yun. After recovering the monks, they challenge Chase to a Xiaolin Showdown. It is a soccer game with no Shen Gong Wu involved. They win the game to gain Omi's freedom. In the end they all achieve the level of Wudai Warrior.
| 41 | 2 | "Bird of Paradise" | Jeff Allen | Stephen Sustarsic | September 24, 2005 | 257–892 | 2.9 |
The monks are now Wudai Warriors, and they are going on their first Wudai quest. They receive an omen from a singing old woman that the Bird of Paradise is coming. Their quest is to find the Bird of Paradise. Using a mystical leaf and using no Shen Gong Wu, they must search for the bird in Chase Young's domain, the Land of Nowhere. Using their new Wudai powers, they overcome obstacles that Chase Young has put in their way. When the warriors find the bird, they meet Chase and have a battle. At the end of the battle, Jack appears to take the bird, but it turns out that the bird was really the singing old woman. She then tells them their greatest qualities—courage, loyalty, strength, and kindness.
| 42 | 3 | "The Life and Times of Hannibal Roy Bean" | Jeff Allen | Stephen Sustarsic | October 1, 2005 | 257–893 | 2.9 |
A new Shen Gong Wu, the Moby Morpher, has been revealed. Kimiko manages to get it, but it is soon stolen by the Ying-Ying Bird. The bird takes it to Hannibal Roy Bean, the villain responsible for turning Chase Young evil and who Chase trapped in the Ying-Yang World almost immediately after being turned evil. Hannibal Bean then tricks Omi by disguising himself as Jack into freeing him from the Ying-Yang World, and now Bean plans to unleash a new type of evil on the world.
| 43 | 4 | "Omi Town" | Jeff Allen | Mark Zaslove | October 8, 2005 | 257–894 | 3.2 |
It is Chinese New Year, and everyone except Omi receives gifts from their families. In an effort to cheer him up, Master Fung suggests Omi go on a quest to find where he belongs. The Warriors travel to a town where everyone looks exactly like the young monk. There, Omi finally finds his 'parents', though they are not exactly what he expected. Much to his fellow Warriors' dismay, Omi decides to stay with them on their run-down farm. Now with one less warrior at the Xiaolin Temple, Wuya, Hannibal Bean and Jack plot to break into the Temple to steal Shen Gong Wu, however, they do not know that they are being closely watched.
| 44 | 5 | "Treasure of the Blind Swordsman" | Stephen Sandoval | Marc Drotman & Eric Molina | November 5, 2005 | 257–895 | 2.6 |
Master Fung sends the Warriors on a quest to find the Treasure of the Blind Swordsman. While on their quest, the Warriors will find their new Wudai Weapons, each chosen for a particular monk. However, Wuya and Jack are hot on their trail, and Hannibal Bean's secretly plotting something of his own.
| 45 | 6 | "Oil in the Family" | Jeff Allen | Steve Cuden | November 12, 2005 | 257–896 | 2.6 |
A new Shen Gong Wu is revealed, the Rio Reverso, a Wu that can revert any object into its original form. Jack goes after it and with some help from Wuya, Jack plots a plan to make an army of baby dinosaurs made from oil. Wuya steals Jack's Rio Reverso and his idea of an army of dinosaurs and she ends up creating an adult T-Rex.
| 46 | 7 | "The Return of Master Monk Guan" | Stephen Sandoval | Stephen Sustarsic | November 19, 2005 | 257–897 | N/A |
In preparation for going up against Hannibal Bean, Master Fung sends the Warriors and Dojo to a new temple, which turns out to be run by Master Monk Guan. Due to the rough training and hostility with Guan, Raimundo quits and seemingly joins Hannibal Bean.
| 47 | 8 | "Dream Stalker" | Jeff Allen | Brandon Sawyer | November 26, 2005 | 257–898 | 1.9/10 |
With the Shadow of Fear and Sapphire Dragon, Hannibal Bean enters Raimundo's mind to bring out his worst fear and use it against the monks. While they are busy fighting his fear, Bean puts his plan into motion to try to slowly break down Raimundo.
| 48 | 9 | "Chucky Choo" | Stephen Sandoval | Eric Shaw | February 11, 2006 | 257–899 | 2.2/9 |
After learning a con dragon named Chucky Choo sold fake Shen Gong Wu to them, Wuya, Jack, and Cyclops vow revenge on him.
| 49 | 10 | "Wu Got the Power" | Jeff Allen | Steve Cuden | February 18, 2006 | 257–900 | 2.4/10 |
Hannibal Bean gets into Omi's head while he is sleeping and tells Omi that he should take all the Wudai Warriors' elemental Shen Gong Wu and master the power of the elements to become the Xiaolin Leader.
| 50 | 11 | "Hannibal's Revenge" | Stephen Sandoval | David Silverman | February 25, 2006 | 257–901 | N/A |
Kimiko uses her PDA, the Mind Reader Conch, Changing Chopsticks and the Eye of Dashi to connect herself to a satellite so that she can read the world's thoughts. Hannibal Bean spies on her and acquires secret information about Chase's weakness to the Heylin Eclipse. Wuya teams up with Hannibal to destroy Chase and steal all the Shen Gong Wu.
| 51 | 12 | "Time After Time (Parts I & II)" | Jeff Allen | Stephen Sustarsic | May 6, 2006 | 257–902 | 2.3/9 |
| 52 | 13 | "Time After Time (Parts I & II)" | Stephen Sandoval | Stephen Sustarsic | May 13, 2006 | 257–903 | 2.4/10 |
Master Fung tells the monks that the leader will be revealed after they do their last quest. Omi decides to go back in time (with Dojo) and stop Chase from entering the Heylin side. Realizing that he needs the Sands of Time, Omi freezes himself for 80 years to talk to his old self but he realizes that Jack Spicer has conquered the world in his absence. Omi successfully switches Chase Young's evil Lao-Mang-Long soup with pea soup which stops him from turning evil. However, in exchange, the future has changed for the worse. Instead of turning Chase Young evil, Hannibal turns Master Monk Guan evil, and Omi's friends have been turned into farmers, while Master Fung is trapped in the Ying-Yang world and Jack turns good once again. The Sands of Time was destroyed with the Kuzusu Atom by Hannibal Bean which makes it impossible for Omi to go back and undo all of Bean's actions. After acquiring the soup Omi hid in the past, they are captured by Hannibal and his crew. Chase then sacrifices his good side to free the Warriors. After the Warriors get to the Heylin Seed's vault, Hannibal and his crew start a Xiaolin Showdown. The Warriors defeat Hannibal, Wuya, Chase Young, and Master Monk Guan in a 4-way tag team Xiaolin Showdown, and when they win, Chase Young smiles briefly (showing that he probably wanted them to win). Omi then recovers his frozen past self and the two make contact, causing a paradox that resets time back to how it was before, undoing all the changes. In the end, with time restored and the world back to normal, Raimundo becomes the new Shoku Warrior, and is named the leader of the Xiaolin Dragons, with everyone happy for him - Omi included. As all the villains gather together for one last Xiaolin versus Heylin Cosmic Clash Showdown, the Xiaolin Dragons charge in, resolute as always.
