= Departed =

Departed may refer to:

- The Departed, a 2006 film by Martin Scorsese
- "Right Here (Departed)", a 2008 song by Brandy

== See also ==
- The Departed (disambiguation)
- Dead
