= Xiaolin Showdown (video game) =

2006 video game

- North American PlayStation 2 cover art
- Developers: BottleRocket Entertainment (PS2, Xbox, PSP); Razorback Developments (NDS)
- Publishers: Konami; Warner Bros. Interactive Entertainment
- Writers: Christy Hui; Stephen Sustarsic
- Composers: Kevin Manthei; Allister Brimble (NDS); Anthony N. Putson (NDS)
- Platforms: PlayStation 2; Xbox; PlayStation Portable; Nintendo DS
- Release: PlayStation 2; PlayStation Portable; Xbox; NA: November 14, 2006; EU: June 29, 2007; Nintendo DS; NA: November 28, 2006; EU: February 2007
- Genres: Beat 'em up, fighting
- Modes: Single-player, multiplayer

Xiaolin Showdown is a beat 'em up and fighting video game based on the animated television series of the same name. It was released for the PlayStation 2, PlayStation Portable, and Xbox on November 14, 2006, in North America and in Europe on June 29, 2007. The game was released for the Nintendo DS on November 28, 2006, in North America and in Europe in February 2007. Players are able to play as the Xiaolin Apprentices. The game can be played with up to four players locally.

This was the last game to be released for the Xbox in Europe.

== Gameplay ==
The gameplay is reminiscent of that of Power Stone and the Super Smash Bros. series. The player's main goal is to be the last man standing. One of the game objectives is to get the Shen Gong Wu. The Shen Gong Wu require the use of "Chi Energy" from the player.

There are six playable characters in the game: Omi, Raimundo Pedrosa, Kimiko Tohomiko, Clay Bailey, Jack Spicer and Chase Young, the latter two of which must be unlocked first. When Xiaolin Showdowns take place, the competitors get transported to an arena where they face off in a random mini-game. Master Fung appears in some parts of the game, giving tips for the player. Players can use Shen Gong Wu to aid them in battle. The player uses an in-game currency called "blessing coins" to buy Wu.

== Development ==
The game was first exhibited in May 2006 at E3, and an updated prototype was exhibited at Konami's 2006 Summer BBQ event. The PlayStation 2, PlayStation Portable and Xbox versions were developed by BottleRocket Entertainment, and the Nintendo DS release by Razorback Developments.

== Reception ==
Reception

Review scores
Publication	Score
Play Generation Special	65% (PS2)
IGN	6/10 (PS2); 6/10 (Xbox)
1Up.com	C− (Xbox)
GameZone	4.3/10 (Xbox)
Eurogamer	4/10 (PSP); 2/10 (PS2)
GameSpot	3.6/10 (PSP); 3.6/10 (PS2); 3.6/10 (Xbox); 6.4/10 (DS)
GameSpy	1.5/5 (PSP); 1.5/5 (PS2); 1.5/5 (Xbox)
GameShark	D
Jeuxvideo.com	10/20 (DS); 6/20 (PS2)
GamesRadar	1.5/5 (Xbox)

Xiaolin Showdown received mixed to negative reviews from critics. Many reviews compared it unfavorably to other, better four-player brawlers such as Super Smash Bros. or Power Stone. Eurogamer gave the PlayStation 2 version of the game an overall score of 2 out of 10, calling it "unfun", criticizing its "unimpressive" graphics and "ridiculously easy" gameplay, and bluntly calling it an "atrocious excuse for a video game", further stating that "Everything about it is just wrong. To be able to put out a title this broken with so many great modern and retro games from which to draw influence is a hell of an achievement."
