= Mike Milo =

American film director

- Born: July 22, 1965 (age 61); Hackensack, New Jersey, U.S.
- Occupations: Animator, cartoon director, storyboard artist, writer, producer
- Years active: 1990–present

Mike Milo (born July 22, 1965) is an American animator, director, storyboard artist, writer, and producer in the television industry.

== Early life ==
Milo graduated in 1983 from Northern Valley Regional High School at Old Tappan. Growing up in Old Tappan, New Jersey, he began his animation career in 1990 animating commercials for Broadcast Arts (later known as Curious Pictures) in New York City.

== Career ==
Milo's first directing job was at Film Roman, where he was the assistant director on Gracie Films' The Critic. He created and directed two shorts titled Bloo's Gang and The Ignoramooses for Cartoon Network's showcase series What a Cartoon!, and went on to direct numerous TV shows (some of which he had worked on earlier in his career) such as Animaniacs, Pinky and the Brain, and Xiaolin Showdown. He also did the first US pilot starring an east Indian boy called Swaroop for a WB/Cartoon Network co-production that ultimately ended up being in the "Big Pick" contest on The Cartoon Cartoon Show. From there, he went on to head up the animation department at 3DBob Productions on The Godman, a Christian feature distributed by Book of Hope International. He was creative producer and director on the WB show Generation O. He created and directed a cartoon for Nickelodeon and Frederator Studios called Flavio, which would be seen as part of the animated showcase series Random! Cartoons, in 2008. In 2007, he served as Director of Animation for Gigapix Studios headed by David Pritchard, and has directed episodes of the animated series Chowder for Cartoon Network.

Milo directed and animated three shorts called True Stories for Smosh, which to date have garnered over 30 million hits on YouTube.

He directed the 2019-2021 series Scooby-Doo and Guess Who? at Warner Bros. Animation. He was an animation director on Uncle Grandpa as well as Craig of the Creek, both for Cartoon Network. He was also a story artist on Curious George for Universal. In 2012, he worked as a storyboard artist for The Fairly OddParents, and developed a pilot with Butch Hartman. Before that, he directed the animated series Randy Cunningham: 9th Grade Ninja at Titmouse, Inc. for Disney XD. He is also known to have designed the characters for the Comedy Central series Brickleberry, although he is uncredited. Before that, he was a story artist on the show Phineas and Ferb for Disney Channel and co-wrote nine episodes for that series. He worked for Sierra On-Line and Warner Bros., again as an animator working on Tiny Toon Adventures, Animaniacs, Taz-Mania, Pinky and the Brain and Histeria!. He has also worked for Disney Television Animation, Frederator Studios, Film Roman, Hanna-Barbera, Universal Animation Studios, Nickelodeon, Cartoon Network Studios, DIC Entertainment, Saban, Mike Young Productions, and other smaller studios.

=== Animation Insider ===
Mike Milo and his wife Laura Milo launched the website Animation Insider, which interviews animation artists around the world.
