= The Departed (disambiguation) =

The Departed is a 2006 film directed by Martin Scorsese.

The Departed may also refer to:

- "The Departed" (The Green Green Grass), an episode of the television series The Green Green Grass
- The Departed: A Novel, by Kathy Mackel
- "The Departed" (The Vampire Diaries), an episode of the television series The Vampire Diaries
- The Departed (band), a red dirt/southern rock band from Oklahoma
