= Xiaolin Chronicles =

American-French animated/CG television series

- Xiaolin Chronicles promotional image
- Genre: Action-adventure; Martial arts; Science fiction comedy
- Created by: Christy Hui
- Directed by: Christelle Naga
- Starring: Tara Strong; Eric Bauza; Jennifer Hale; David Kaye; Michael Donovan; Cree Summer
- Composers: David Vadant; Patrick Sigwalt; Benjamin Ribolet
- Countries of origin: United States; France
- Original languages: English; French
- No. of seasons: 1
- No. of episodes: 26

Production
- Executive producers: Sandrine Nguyen; Boris Hertzog; Christy Hui
- Running time: 22 minutes
- Production companies: ActionFliks Media Corporation; Genao Productions

Original release
- Network: Gulli / Canal J (France); Disney XD (episodes 1–20); Netflix (episodes 21–26)
- Release: August 26, 2013 – July 1, 2015

Related
- Xiaolin Showdown

Xiaolin Chronicles (笑林傳記) is an French-American animated/CG television series presented as a continuation of Xiaolin Showdown. The series premiered on August 26, 2013, with three back-to-back episodes serving as a preview. The full series premiered on September 14, 2013. It was produced by ActionFliks Media Corporation in collaboration with the French studio Genao Productions. It is the only Xiaolin Showdown production made without the involvement of Warner Bros. Animation.

The show aired for twenty episodes from August 26, 2013, to March 6, 2014, on Disney XD, leaving the last six episodes unaired in the United States until July 1, 2015, when Chronicles was made available to watch on Netflix.

In a newsletter published on July 25, 2015, creator Christy Hui announced that Chronicles would not continue with a second season and is a standalone series. However, she stated that there would be a new Xiaolin project that will continue in a format to that of Showdown.

== Production ==
Produced in France and the United States with Christy Hui returning as executive producer, the show is animated in 2D animation while CGI was used for all of the Xiaolin Showdown scenes. The show features new character designs and a slightly altered logo for the show. With the exception of Tara Strong (Omi, Ping Pong) and Jennifer Hale (Kimiko in Chronicles only, Katnappe, Willow), the original's voice cast was replaced due to budget and timing issues. All Shen Gong Wu from the original series had to be renamed, although Warner Bros. Animation was not involved with the series before ended the partnership with the series after ended in 2006, the titles and rights to the names was originally produced by Warner Bros. before being moved to ActionFliks Media Corporation during production for unknown reasons. Sunwoo Entertainment contributed some of the animation for this series.

== Plot ==
Omi, Kimiko, and Clay have recently risen to the rank of Shoku Warrior, while Raimundo had attained the rank previously. The group must continue to uphold their duty of finding and collecting all of the mystical Shen Gong Wu artifacts before the evil Heylin forces do. They are joined by a recruit from Europe named Ping Pong, who competes with a mysterious girl named Willow for the position of Xiaolin Apprentice. Through the events of the show's pilot, the monks learn that Willow is actually a spy of the formidable Heylin warrior Chase Young called Shadow. She and Chase destroy the temple and take all the Shen Gong Wu. With their temple destroyed, the monks must search for a new temple, while still trying to collect all the Shen Gong Wu and protecting the world from the likes of Chase Young and the villainous Jack Spicer.

== Characters ==
- Omi (voiced by Tara Strong) – The Xiaolin Dragon of Water, his elemental Shen Gong Wu is the Orb of Torpedo since the first Xiaolin Dragon of Water, Cheng Yin. His main attack, "Shoku Neptune Water", allows him to control and manipulate water. He is the most skilled of the Xiaolin monks. He has a very big ego and tends to think himself better than everyone else. This sometimes makes him brag and put others down, and when someone does something better than him, he usually becomes jealous and tries to outdo that person. Due to his sheltered upbringing, he is somewhat sexist, and he has a penchant for misinterpreting modern slang and idioms. Strong was the only main cast member from the original series to reprise her role.
- Kimiko Tohomiko (voiced by Jennifer Hale) – The Xiaolin Dragon of Fire from Tokyo, Japan, her elemental Shen Gong Wu is the Hanabi Star since the first Xiaolin Dragon of Fire, Xiang Quen. Her main attack, "Shoku Mars Fire", allows her to conjure up great blazing fireballs. Known to be short-tempered & stubborn, Kimiko hates being made to feel incompetent or insignificant. Despite this, she is quite compassionate and affectionate toward her friends. Kimiko's interests include technology and fashion.
- Raimundo Pedrosa (voiced by Eric Bauza) – The Xiaolin Dragon of Wind hailing from Rio de Janeiro, Brazil, his elemental Shen Gong Wu is the Sword Of Lucida since the first Xiaolin Dragon of Wind, Qin Fu. His main attack, "Shoku Astro Wind", allows him to fly and to literally blow his enemies away. Raimundo is lazy, impulsive, and prone to making rash decisions; however, he is an excellent strategist and cares deeply for those he considers friends.
- Clay Bailey (voiced by David Kaye) – The Xiaolin Dragon of Earth from Texas in the United States, his elemental Shen Gong Wu is the Fist of the Iron Bear since the first Xiaolin Dragon of Earth, Zheng Li Kai. His main attack, "Shoku Jupiter Earth", allows him to create fissures or shatter boulders. He is shown to be gentle despite his big size and can often come up with simple solutions to complicated problems.
- Ping Pong (voiced by Tara Strong) – The 5th monk chosen at the Xiaolin Temple as Xiaolin Dragon of the Wood, Ping Pong is the first new character introduced in this series. Ping Pong resembles Omi, but younger & wearing big green glasses since the first Xiaolin Dragon of Wood, Cao Baidu. His birth name is "Boris Antonio Rolf Jean-Pierre Gaulle LeGrand IV". Due to his long name, Omi decides to call him "Ping Pong". As his protégé, Omi refers to Ping Pong as his "little gecko". In his backstory, Ping Pong grew up in Europe as a speedy errand boy delivering messages to monasteries throughout Europe. He was soon inspired by hearing legends of the Xiaolin monks and decides to join them on their adventures. His main abilities are his running speed and fast moves.
- Dojo Kanojo Cho (voiced by Michael Donovan) – A size-shifting yellow Chinese dragon, Dojo serves as the Xiaolin Warriors' main mode of transportation and wisecracking advisor. He often shows affection for Master Fung, he previously had green skin with yellow scales in the original series.
- Master Fung (voiced by Michael Donovan) – A wise old master, trainer, and guide to the Xiaolin Warriors, he provides the Xiaolin Warriors advice that can help them solve their problems.
- Chase Young (voiced by David Kaye) – The main antagonist, Chase is an immortal evil warrior who renews his desire to destroy the Xiaolin Monks and plots to create a Heylin Empire, he transforms into a Komodo dragon-like beast whenever he gets enraged. He created Shadow and shares a connection with her.
- Shadow (voiced by Jennifer Hale) – Shadow, the second new character introduced in the series, is a dark spy who works for Chase Young and often thinks Jack and Chase are too incompetent to be evil. She can hide in the shadows and communicate telepathically with Chase Young. When the Xiaolin monks first met her, she disguises as a girl named Willow. She and Ping Pong competed for the Xiaolin Apprentice top spot, as well as for Omi's attention. Kimiko began to grow more suspicious of her and eventually discovered her secret identity as Shadow.
- Jack Spicer (voiced by Eric Bauza) – Self-proclaiming as an "Evil Boy Genius" and aspiring to rule the world, Jack is largely incompetent and a bit of a bumbler, though he is persistent and never loses sight of his goals. He often refers to himself as an "evil entrepreneur." Sometimes allies himself with the Xiaolin Monks, but tries hard to impress Chase Young.
- Wuya (voiced by Cree Summer) – The once most powerful and evil Heylin Witch, she was defeated by Grand Master Dashi in the first Xiaolin Showdown and imprisoned in a spring contained within a puzzle box. Released 1,500 years later by Jack Spicer, Wuya needs him to collect Dashi's Shen Gong Wu to rule the world once again and plunge the world into 10,000 years of darkness. She frequently berates and mocks Jack. She returns to her human self thanks to Shadow and team up to overthrow Chase Young, however this was actually a ruse as she traps her and Princess Kaila in the Shanga World.
- Katnappe (voiced by Jennifer Hale) – A cat-themed criminal and one of Jack Spicer's allies.
- Tubbimura (voiced by Eric Bauza) – An overweight but agile ninja and one of Jack Spicer's allies.
- Cyclops – A one-eyed giant and one of Jack Spicer's allies.
- Pandabubba (voiced by Eric Bauza) – A panda-themed crime lord.
- Salvador Cumo (voiced by David Kaye) – A charming but conniving criminal that can transform into a Komodo dragon and regenerate lost limbs. He was once allies with Wuya and seems to have some sort of mysterious connection to Chase Young.
- Tiny Sim/Weaselnator (voiced by Tara Strong) – A young aspiring villain who idolized Jack, seeking to apprentice under the evil genius. However, once he acquired the Rooster Booster Shen Gong Wu, he betrayed Jack and dissolved their partnership. Before meeting Jack, Tiny Sim was the president and webmaster for the Online Jack Fanclub.
- Warden (voiced by Eric Bauza) – A demented Game Show Host summoned by Chase Young to keep the Xiaolin Monks from obtaining The Mask of The Green Monkey.

== Episodes ==
No.	Title	Written by	Original release date (Note: Episodes 21–26 were released online.)	U.S. viewers (millions)
1	"New Monk on the Block"	Christy Hui and Stephen Sustarsic	August 26, 2013	0.48
After many years has passed since the battle against the Heylins, Omi takes newcomer Ping Pong on as his protégé, but eventually grows jealous of Ping Pong when he becomes everyone's favorite. This causes a rift between the Monks, further complicated by the arrival of a beautiful new candidate.
2	"A Girl Named Willow"	Christy Hui and Stephen Sustarsic	August 26, 2013	0.37
Willow and Ping Pong compete for the Xiaolin Apprentice top spot, as well as for Omi's attention. Meanwhile, Kimiko grows suspicious of Willow's motives.
3	"The Fall of Xiaolin"	Christy Hui and Stephen Sustarsic	August 26, 2013	0.49
When Willow uses her charms on all the boys in the temple, Kimiko becomes even more suspicious and she eventually discovers Willow's secret double identity as Shadow. Meanwhile, Chase Young captures Ping Pong and takes revenge on Xiaolin by destroying the temple. Now the Xiaolin Monks must go on a journey to find a new Xiaolin Temple.
4	"Buddy Blue Ray and the Golden Bunnies"	Christy Hui and Stephen Sustarsic	September 14, 2013	0.46
Dojo dreams about the mysterious dancing bunnies, which lead to the Golden Bunny (a mystical talisman hidden amongst the giant bunnies in an ancient citadel). The Monks must do what it takes to find and protect the sacred object, while keeping the giant bunnies at bay or they will mutate into beastly creatures and destroy the village.
5	"Tokyo Madness"	Christy Hui and Stephen Sustarsic	September 21, 2013	0.44
Kimiko must save the day by going inside Digital Tokyo, a virtual world built by her father to battle a giant cyber worm created by Jack Spicer.
6	"Magic Stallion and the Wild Wild West"	Christy Hui and Stephen Sustarsic	September 28, 2013	0.51
Clay leads the Xiaolin Monks on a Wild West adventure, saving his Grandpappy's cattle from being turned into a casualty of Jack's latest evil scientific experiment at the time when he is collaborating with PandaBubba.
7	"Laws of Nature"	Christy Hui and Stephen Sustarsic	October 5, 2013	0.45
Chase Young discovers a weak link in the ecological order that, if manipulated properly, will cause a domino effect of cataclysmic destruction. Meanwhile, Jack's mishaps causes Chase's evil plan to backfire.
8	"Out of Ping Pong's Mind"	Christy Hui and Stephen Sustarsic	October 12, 2013	0.34
Chase Young grows wary of Ping Pong's power. To destroy him, Chase uses Ping Pong's own mind as a trap, literally.
9	"Xiaolin Redemption"	Christy Hui and Stephen Sustarsic	October 19, 2013	0.40
The heroes must escort the dangerous, slippery Salvador Cumo (a criminal that can turn into a humanoid Komodo dragon) to prison. Along the journey, Raimundo winds up falling prey to Salvador's charm and childhood stories which puts the Monks' lives and mission at risk. Meanwhile, Wuya plans to recruit Salvador Cumo to her side.
10	"Princess Kaila of the Thousand Layer Mountain"	Christy Hui and Stephen Sustarsic	October 26, 2013	0.42
Chase Young launches an all out attack on the Xiaolin Monks turning everyone except Omi into Cat Warriors. To save his friends, Omi must travel back in time to find Grand Master Dashi for advice.
11	"Planet of Dragons"	Christy Hui and Stephen Sustarsic	November 2, 2013	0.45
Dojo learns about his true destiny. A new Shen-Gong-Wu sends the Xiaolin Warriors to the future to the Dragon Planet which is ruled by dragons. The Dragon Planet is where all humans are enslaved and Dojo is the King of Dragon Planet.
12	"The Mask of the Green Monkey"	Christy Hui and Stephen Sustarsic	November 9, 2013	0.36
When the Mask of the Green Monkey surfaces, Omi ignores everyone's advice and insists on going after the mysterious object.
13	"Mi Temple, Mi Casa"	Christy Hui, Marcel Jasny and Stephen Sustarsic	December 6, 2013	0.61
The Monks discover that their new temple has a mystical talking tree. Meanwhile Chase possesses the tree and uses his powers to manifest the Monks personal fears into reality.
14	"Heylin Within"	Christy Hui and Stephen Sustarsic	February 1, 2014	0.41
Newbie Shoku Warrior Ping Pong duplicates himself with the Ring of Catsumi Shen Gong Wu, but becomes vulnerable to Chase's evil plan to turn him into Reptilian Ping Pong.
15	"Tigress Woo"	Christy Hui and Julien Magnat	February 8, 2014	0.34
When Kimiko's older sister Tigress (Tomoko) shows up on her birthday and one of the Shen Gong Wu mysteriously disappears, Kimiko tries to figure out if Tigress (Tomoko) is on the side of good or evil.
16	"Heal Me"	Christy Hui and Stephen Sustarsic	February 10, 2014	0.22
Jack turns into a great motivational speaker, and Good Jack and Dojo join him. He even helps Good Jack find the Shen Gong Wu.
17	"Rocco"	Christy Hui	February 11, 2014	0.18
Dojo and his childhood friend Rocco must work together to rescue the Xiaolin Monks and Master Fung before they turn into zombies.
18	"Super Cow Patty"	Christy Hui, Mark Zaslove, Thomas Barichella	March 24, 2014	0.10
When a cow themed vigilante by the name of Super Cow Patty shows up, the monks quickly find themselves being upstaged. Not only is Cow Patty beating them to the Shen Gong Wu, he also has a secret connection to one of the monks.
19	"Chase Lays an Egg"	Christy Hui, Marcel Jasny, Mark Zaslove, Peter Saisselin	March 25, 2014	0.20
Chase experiences unusual side effects when he is accidentally exposed to a toxic serum, causing him to literally lay an egg. Elsewhere, Omi offers his hand in friendship to Jack, and together steal Chase's egg believing it to be a new powerful Shen Gong Wu.
20	"Drawn to Be Evil"	Steven Cuden	March 26, 2014	0.22
A young boy named Tiny Sim aspires to become as evil and villainous as his idol, Jack Spicer. Using the Prism of Genesis Shen Gong Wu, he raises an army of demented weasels, becoming the Evil Weaselnator.
21	"Omi Saves the Holidays"	Mark Zaslove	July 1, 2015 (Note: This episode first aired on July 7, 2014 in Poland.)	N/A
Christmas time comes and all the monks are excited, except Omi. Yet, the monks must save the spirit of the holiday from Jack Spicer, when he tries to make "Jackmas".
22	"Who Shrunk Master Fung?"	Eric Shaw	July 1, 2015 (Note: This episode first aired on December 15, 2014 in Poland.)	N/A
While preparing for Master Fung's return, Dojo accidentally shrinks Fung. It's up to the monks to travel to Chase's lair to save Master Fung's life.
23	"Back in the Flesh Again"	Mark Zaslove	July 1, 2015 (Note: This episode first aired on December 16, 2014 in Poland.)	N/A
Wuya and Jack hunt down two important Shen Gong Wu in order to restore Wuya to her human form. Meanwhile, Omi becomes jealous of Ping Pong when he beats Omi in a talent show, and Shadow abandons Chase.
24	"The Call of the Dragon"	Christy Hui and Mark Zaslove	July 1, 2015 (Note: This episode first aired on December 17, 2014 in Poland.)	N/A
Kimiko has strange visions about a dragon, and none of the other monks believe her. Meanwhile, Chase is getting closer to the Shanga World and the Xiaolin Chi.
25	"The Mark of the Dragon Spirit"	Christy Hui and Mark Zaslove	July 1, 2015 (Note: This episode first aired on December 18, 2014 in Poland.)	N/A
With Chase having stolen the Xiaolin Chi, Kimiko travels to the Planet of Dragons while the Boys, accompanied by Jack, follow. Kimiko is given the chance to bond with a dragon, much to Omi's jealousy. Chase realizes he cannot access the Xiaolin Powers without the dragon spirits.
26	"Fly the Dragon!"	Christy Hui and Mark Zaslove	July 1, 2015 (Note: This episode first aired on December 19, 2014 in Poland.)	N/A
Chase Young, now empowered with Chi, begins to destroy the universe. Kimiko must work with a jealous Omi to awake the Cosmic Dragon to defeat Chase.

== Principal voice actors ==
- Eric Bauza - Raimundo Pedrosa, Jack Spicer, Tubbimura, PandaBubba, Grand Master Dashi, Cheng Yin, Warden
- Michael Donovan - Dojo Kanojo Cho, Master Fung, Qin Fu, Cao Baidu
- Jennifer Hale - Kimiko Tohomiko, Ashley (Katnappe), Shadow, Willow, Princess Kaila, Xiang Quen, Miseryland Cheerleaders
- David Kaye - Clay Bailey, Chase Young, Salvadore Cumo, Rocco, Zheng Li Kai, Zippy Lou (full dragon)
- Tara Strong - Omi, Ping Pong, Muffin Face, Tiny Sim, Moonata
- Cree Summer - Wuya, Tigress (Tomoko), Mean Girls, Viper Club Leader

== Crew ==
- Collette Sunderman - Casting Director and Voice Director

== International broadcast ==
The series premiered on Cartoon Network in the United Kingdom on March 4, 2014. Cartoon Network Southeast Asia followed on December 15, 2014. In Australia, Xiaolin Chronicles debuted on Eleven on June 7, 2015, with a second run on Cartoon Network beginning July 17, 2015. The series debuted with the launch of Family Chrgd on October 9, 2015 in Canada.
