= Can of Worms (film) =

- VHS cover
- Written by: Kathy Mackel
- Directed by: Paul Schneider
- Starring: Michael Shulman; Erika Christensen; Adam Wylie; Andrew Ducote; Lee Garlington; Brighton Hertford; Garrett M. Brown; Malcolm McDowell
- Music by: Mark Mothersbaugh
- Countries of origin: United States; Canada
- Original language: English

Production
- Producers: Marcy Gross; Joe Goodman
- Cinematography: Mark Irwin
- Editor: Andrew Cohen
- Running time: 85 minutes
- Production company: Gross-Weston Productions

Original release
- Network: Disney Channel
- Release: April 10, 1999

Can of Worms is a science fiction comedy film and is part of the Disney Channel Original Movie lineup. It premiered on Disney Channel on April 10, 1999, and is based on the novel of the same name by Kathy Mackel, which was a Young Reader's Choice Nominee in 2002 and a nominee for the 2001 Rhode Island Children's Book Award. It is also the first Disney Channel Original Movie to be rated TV-PG.

== Plot ==
Mike Pillsbury is a teenage boy who believes that he is an alien and does not belong on Earth. Mike is injured during a football game and sees an alien as part of a hallucination. Mike wonders if football is the right sport for him, but his father, a former football player, insists he stick with the sport.

Mike is surprised when Katelyn Sandman, a popular girl at school, requests his help decorating the school for an upcoming Halloween dance party. Mike's foe, Scott Schriebner, who is a player on Mike's football team and a friend of Katelyn, sabotages the light and music equipment during the Halloween party. Mike, upset about the party, leaves and uses a satellite dish to send a message to outer space asking to be rescued. Lightning subsequently destroys the satellite dish.

The next day, an alien dog named Barnabus appears, with the ability to speak through a translating device. Barnabus explains that because of Mike, the stargate door has been opened. Barnabus tells Mike that he represents a galactic organization specializing in disaster relief and rights violations, and that he has arrived to answer Mike's plea to be taken off the planet. Barnabus explains that time is limited, as other aliens with ulterior motives are traveling through the stargate to find Mike.

Mike, who believes he is hallucinating, later meets The Bom, an alien lawyer insistent on having Mike sue Earth for millions of galactic credits for pain and suffering due to the planet's substandard living conditions. During a telephone conversation with Katelyn, Mike is disgusted by The Bom's way of consuming food, leading Katelyn to believe that Mike is distracted and not listening to her. The Bom angrily leaves after Mike refuses to sue. Mike's friend Nick believes that Mike is going crazy after being told about the aliens.

When Barnabus is informed of The Bom's visit, he tells Mike that he opened a can of worms by sending his message, as it signaled to the universe that Earth has advanced to a certain technological level. Because of this, Barnabus says Earth is no longer eligible for intergalactic protection for primitive life. Mike accepts Barnabus' offer to take him to a place where he can be alone, but first tries to make amends with Katelyn. However, the Loafer Alien arrives and prevents Mike from meeting with Katelyn, who believes he has rudely ignored her after insisting that they talk. The alien proposes becoming Mike's agent, representing him throughout the galaxy and eventually having him star in a weekly television show about his life as an immigrant. Mike declines the offer.

Nick is stunned when multiple aliens arrive with various offers for Mike. Katelyn visits Mike's house and becomes aware of the aliens. Mike prepares to make a deal with one of the aliens to be taken off the planet, but the aliens retreat as a Thoad – a dangerous alien that enjoys capturing rare specimens – approaches. Nick's young brother Jay unexpectedly arrives and is sucked into the stargate by the Thoad, and taken to the alien's home planet. Barnabus says the Thoad will continue capturing specimens until he finds the perfect one.

The children ask Scott to act as bait for the Thoad in order to get through the stargate to the Thoad planet, where the Thoad is safe from intergalactic authorities. Scott is initially skeptical about the children's alien claims, but they convince him that he is the perfect specimen for the job. The stargate opens to pull Scott in, briefly allowing Barnabus and the other children to go through it as well. Barnabus and the three children end up in a cave where the Thoad keeps his zoo of captured species from other planets. Among the specimens is an alien identical to the ones Mike described in his stories, although he is not sure how he could have knowledge of such a creature. The Thoad, in his human form, confronts Barnabus and the children.

The Thoad transforms into his frog-like alien form, but is then temporarily contained within a cage. Mike uses the Thoad's key to release the captured specimens, including Scott and Jay. Barnabus and the children return to Earth, but the stargate stays open long enough for the Thoad to follow them. Barnabus contacts the intergalactic police to have the Thoad arrested. Before the Thoad could drag Mike into the stargate Barnabus barks for the first time just as the police come. At a football game, Barnabus informs Mike that his transmission has been deemed accidental and that Earth is classified again as a protected planet. Though Barnabus offers to take Mike with him, Mike accepts that Earth is his home and says farewell to his friend.

== Cast ==
- Michael Shulman as Mike Pillsbury
- Erika Christensen as Katelyn Sandman
- Adam Wylie as Nick
- Andrew Ducote as Jay, Nick's younger brother
- Garrett M. Brown as Dana Pillsbury, Mike's father (Note: Credited on VHS copies, but not on television broadcasts.)
- Lee Garlington as Pamela Pillsbury, Mike's mother
- Brighton Hertford as Jill Pillsbury, Mike's younger sister
- Marcus Turner as Scott Schriebner, Mike's rival
- Chris Davies as Ryan
- Marie Stillin as Mrs. Nickerson, Teacher In Mike's Computer Class.
- Jessica Murdoch as Katelyn's Friend
- Terry David Mulligan as Coach Trembly
- Hrothgar Mathews as Thoad's Human Form
- Brian Steele as Thoad's Creature Form

=== Voice cast ===
- Malcolm McDowell as Barnabus, an alien resembling a dog.
- Bruce Lanoil as The Bom, an alien lawyer that offers to help Mike file a lawsuit against Earth.
- Wally Wingert as The Loafer Alien, that wants to adapt Mike's life into a TV series.
- David Coburn as The Jarm, an alien that wants Mike to market his "Jarmonica" slicing utensil.
- Tara Strong as Lula, an alien that wants to date Mike. (credited as Tara Charendoff)
- Peter Kelamis as Intergalactic Cop
- JD Hall as Thoad's Creature Form

== Production ==
After her first rewrite on the film's script, Kathy Mackel was replaced by a new writer who did three rewrites. However, Disney was not impressed with the script and rehired Mackel, although very few of her suggestions were used for the script. Mackel subsequently contested for sole screenwriting credit on the script and won through the Writers Guild arbitration process.

The film was shot in Vancouver, British Columbia. Prosthetic and animatronic effects were used for the film, and were provided by Steve Johnson's XFX Group and Stargate Films, Inc.

== Reception ==
In December 2015, Megan Daley of Entertainment Weekly ranked Can of Worms at number 25 on a list of the top 30 Disney Channel Original Movies. Daley wrote, "While Can of Worms isn't as iconic of a PG-fright fest as Halloweentown, it does have a Malcolm McDowell-voiced pup — and an alien has never been so friendly and adorable. (Bonus points for a special appearance by a pre-Parenthood Erika Christensen.)"

In May 2016, Aubrey Page of Collider reviewed each Disney Channel Original Movie released up to that point and placed Can of Worms at number 38. Page praised the film's "surprisingly creepy alien creatures" and noted the involvement of Paul Schneider, Mark Mothersbaugh and Malcolm McDowell, writing, "There's a lot of talent at work here in Can of Worms. [...] But that's not to say this one is good – it isn't. In fact, I certainly wouldn't have remembered this one at all if [the film's] wildly creative creatures hadn't kept me awake for a long, sleepless night in 1999."

== Re-airing ==
Although not shown for many years, the film was broadcast as part of Disney Channel's 2006 "Hauntober Fest" in October. On October 23, 2007, the film reappeared as part of the Halloween film line-up on the Disney Channel. The film was a part of "Wiztober" in 2008 and 2009, which is a mix of Halloween films. Also, the film was re-aired on Disney Channel on October 9, 2011 as part of Disney's "Monstober" event, and on October 6, 2015. The film was also aired in May 2016, as part of Disney Channel's celebration of 100 Disney Channel Original Movies. The film, among other largely unseen DCOMs of the late 90s and early 2000s, was made available on Disney+.
