= Kathy Mackel =

American novelist

Kathryn Mackel
- Born: 1950 (age 75–76)
- Occupations: Author; screenwriter

Kathryn Mackel (born 1950) is an American author and a screenwriter for Disney, Fox, and Showtime.

== Bibliography ==
- The Hidden
- The Surrogate: A Novel
- The Departed: A Novel
- Outriders: Book One in the Birthright Project
- Trackers: Book Two in The Birthright Series
- Vanished
- A Season of Comebacks
- Can of Worms
- Alien in a Bottle
- From the Horse's Mouth
- Eggs in One Basket
- Boost

== Filmography ==
- Left Behind: The Movie
- Disney's Can of Worms
- Frank Peretti's Hangman's Curse
- The Surrogate
