= Christy Hui =

American television producer

- Born: Guangzhou, China
- Education: University of Southern California
- Occupations: Television producer, Business & content development executive, Television writer, author
- Notable work: Xiaolin Showdown, Xiaolin Chronicles, Hulala Girls, Flying Fillies

Christy Hui (許麗緹) is a Chinese film producer and director, who is best known as the creator of Xiaolin Showdown and its spin-off Xiaolin Chronicles. Hui also helped in launching the first pan-Asian cable satellite channel, AXN.

== Career ==
Christy Hui's most notable work, Xiaolin Showdown, ran between 2003 and 2006. It told the story of Omi, Kimiko Tohomiko, Raimundo Pedrosa and Clay Bailey, as they study to become Xiaolin monks, retrieve mystical artifacts known as Shen Gong Wu, and protect the world from 1,500 years of darkness by defeating villains known as the Heylin. The show was produced by Warner Brothers Entertainment and ran on Kids' WB and Cartoon Network simultaneously. After 52 episodes, Warner Brothers decided to end the series. Xiaolin Showdown was one of Kids' WB's best performing television series, ranking among the top 10 overall programs for Saturday morning cartoons, coming in at No. 5 with boys 6-11, No. 4 with tweens 9-14 and No. 3 with male tweens 9-14. Among the broadcast competition, it also ranked No. 3 with boys 2-11, No. 4 with kids 2-11 and No. 6 among kids 6-11.

Following the end of Xiaolin Showdown, Hui claims to have taken a tour of the world to "reconnect". In 2007, she began a project directed at girls age 6 to 12 titled Hulala Girls, which featured a group of magical surfer "princesses of nature." The project consisted of merchandise, web video and a social gaming website themed around environmentalism; Hui claimed in an interview that a tree would be planted for each Hulala doll sold in 2007. The site shut down in 2019, but fans can still purchase merchandise with the character designs on Hui's Redbubble.

In 2013, Hui created a continuation to Xiaolin Showdown known as Xiaolin Chronicles. The series aired from August 2013 to May 2014 on Disney XD, and was later picked up to air the last 6 episodes on Netflix in July 2015. Due to the closing of Kids' WB in 2008 and the network still owning copyright over many of its properties, production of the series was split between Canada and France. While the series is a part of the Xiaolin Showdown' universe, Hui claims that the series is not a continuation, but a standalone series. According to a newsletter in July 2015, Hui hopes to produce a series meant to continue from where Showdown left off.

On November 11, 2015, Hui began a Kickstarter campaign to continue the Xiaolin franchise in the form of graphic novel Xiaolin Dragons. In the description, Hui described the planned series to go deeper into Xiaolin history, answering longtime questions, and developing the universe further. Hui canceled the campaign on November 19, saying that it would return on January 15, 2016. In 2017, Hui announced a special edition of Xiaolin Chronicles available to rent on Vimeo.

In August 2017, Hui joined Amprion Inc. as Chief Marketing Officer, producing several promotional videos for the company.

In 2020, Hui launched a website and trailer for a new film originally called 9 Dragons Tea, later renamed as, TEA: The Drink That Changed The World, a documentary about the history of tea filmed in San Francisco, the Boston Tea Party Ships & Museum, and China's Wuyi Mountains. A second trailer was released in January 2021. The documentary has been released on Amazon Prime, Tubi, Google Play, and YouTube.

In 2022, Hui authored and published a historical middle grade fiction book called Flying Fillies: The Sky's the Limit.
