= Xiaolin Showdown =

American animated television series

- Genre: Action; Comedy drama; Martial arts
- Created by: Christy Hui
- Developed by: Brandon Sawyer
- Voices of: Tara Strong; Tom Kenny; Grey DeLisle; Jeff Bennett; Wayne Knight; Danny Cooksey; Susan Silo; Jason Marsden
- Theme music composer: Chris Vrenna; Clint Walsh
- Opening theme: "Xiaolin Showdown" by Tweaker
- Composer: Kevin Manthei
- Country of origin: United States
- Original language: English
- No. of seasons: 3
- No. of episodes: 52 (list of episodes)

Production
- Executive producer: Sander Schwartz
- Producers: Christy Hui; Bill Motz (season 1); Bob Roth (season 1); David Silverman (season 2); Stephen Sustarsic (season 2)
- Editor: Rob DeSales
- Running time: 21–22 minutes
- Production company: Warner Bros. Animation

Original release
- Network: Kid's WB (The WB)
- Release: November 1, 2003 – May 13, 2006

Related
- Xiaolin Chronicles

Xiaolin Showdown is an American animated television series created by Christy Hui that aired on Kids' WB. Set in a world where martial arts battles and Eastern magic are commonplace, the series follows Omi, Raimundo, Kimiko, and Clay, four young Xiaolin warriors in training who, alongside their dragon companion Dojo, battle the Heylin forces of evil, especially series antagonists Jack Spicer, Wuya, and Chase Young. The Xiaolin warriors set to accomplish this by protecting Shen Gong Wu, a set of ancient artifacts that have great magical powers, from villains who could use them to conquer the world. Typical episodes revolve around a specific Shen Gong Wu and the resulting race on both sides to find it. Episodes often climax with one good and one evil character challenging one another to a magical duel called a Xiaolin Showdown for possession of the artifact. The series features an ensemble voice cast consisting of Tara Strong as Omi, Tom Kenny as Raimundo, Grey DeLisle as Kimiko, Jeff Bennett as Clay, Danny Cooksey as Jack Spicer, and Jason Marsden as Chase Young.

Originally premiering on the Kids' WB block of programming on The WB on November 1, 2003, the series ran for 3 seasons with 52 episodes before its conclusion on May 13, 2006. The series aired in both reruns and second runs on Cartoon Network from 2006 to 2007. It is also confirmed to soon be airing on MeTV Toons. Xiaolin Showdown was a ratings hit for Kids' WB and led to the licensing of spin-off media including DVD releases, a trading card game, and a video game. The series won a Daytime Emmy Award in 2005 and was nominated for three additional Daytime Emmy Awards, one Annie Award, and one Golden Reel Award.

A follow-up series, Xiaolin Chronicles, previewed on August 26, 2013, on Disney XD and began its long-term run on September 14 the same year. The show aired for twenty episodes from August 26, 2013, to March 6, 2014, on Disney XD, leaving the last six episodes unaired in the United States until July 1, 2015, when Chronicles was made available to watch on Netflix.

== Plot ==
=== Season 1 (2003–04) ===
Four young monks—Omi, Kimiko, Raimundo, and Clay—are forced into cooperation at the Xiaolin Temple after learning they are chosen to become Xiaolin Dragons. They become friends and work together, traveling the world in search for Shen Gong Wu, mystical objects with powers that balance the forces of good and evil. Along the way, they must battle the wannabe evil boy genius Jack Spicer, and the evil Heylin sorceress Wuya, whom Jack inadvertently frees from a 1500-year imprisonment in a puzzle box. Through thievery, Spicer gains enough Shen Gong Wu to form Mala Mala Jong, an ancient monster that Wuya uses to help her gain control of the world. Raimundo defies orders and fights the monster, causing the remaining monks to fight and defend the remaining Shen Gong Wu in the Temple's possession. All the monks, except for Raimundo, are promoted to Xiaolin Apprentices. Angered, Raimundo joins the Heylin and helps Wuya regain her human form.

=== Season 2 (2004–05) ===
Omi travels back in time and receives a second puzzle box from Dashi. With no way back to the future, he freezes himself using the Orb of Tornami. In the present time, Omi breaks free of the ice with the puzzle box in hand. Raimundo decides that his rightful place belongs in the Xiaolin Temple with his friends and temporarily traps Wuya in the new puzzle box. After returning to the Temple, the monks continue their search for the Shen Gong Wu. Eventually, Raimundo is promoted to Xiaolin Apprentice.

Afterwards, the monks are introduced to the Xiaolin monk-turned-evil villain Chase Young. Chase takes an interest in Omi and becomes determined to manipulate him into joining the Heylin. When Master Fung is trapped in the Ying-Yang World, Omi asks for help from Chase. He succeeds in rescuing Fung; however, upon leaving the Ying-Yang world, his bad chi takes over and he joins the Heylin. Chase succeeds in restoring Wuya to her human form, though he takes her powers. The remaining monks soon learn that Chase had sent Fung into the Ying-Yang World knowing the events that would unfold afterwards, including Omi joining his side.

=== Season 3 (2005–06) ===
Raimundo, Kimiko, and Clay travel to the Ying-Yang World to retrieve Omi's good chi and return him to the Xiaolin side. After gaining Omi back, the monks are promoted to Wudai Warriors. They are then introduced to Hannibal Roy Bean, a demon from the Ying-Yang World who is responsible for turning Chase Young to the Heylin side.

Toward the end of their journey, Master Fung tells the monks that they have one final quest before the team's leader, the Shoku Warrior, will be revealed. Omi decides that he will stop Hannibal from turning Chase to the Heylin side. He ends up freezing himself to travel to the future and find the Sands of Time. Through time travel, he succeeds by switching the Lao Mang Long Soup with pea soup. However, when he returns to his present time, he learns that his actions have made things worse: instead of Chase joining the Heylin side, it is Chase's former friend, Master Monk Guan, who Hannibal turns evil. The monks and Chase are captured by Hannibal, Wuya, and the evil Guan; Chase sacrifices his good self to save the monks and give them the opportunity to fight and return everything to the way it was. The monks succeed, and the timeline is fixed.

In the end, Raimundo is revealed as the Shoku Warrior. The series concludes with every villain attacking the temple, and the Wudai Warriors led by Raimundo proceed to counterattack.

== Characters ==
The main characters riding Dojo, clockwise from bottom: Omi, Kimiko, Raimundo, and Clay.

=== Main characters ===
- Omi (voiced by Tara Strong) is the Xiaolin Dragon of Water and the first dragon-in-training to train with Master Fung, after the original Xiaolin Dragon of Water, Cheng Yin. At times, Omi can be selfish and boastful, often learning lessons of humility. Despite his occasional moments of egotism, he has a big heart and sees the good in everyone and is always happy to make new friends. Having been raised in the monastery, he is naïve about the outside world. His Wudai Weapon is the Shimo Staff, and his elemental Shen Gong Wu is the Kaijin Charm.
- Kimiko Tohomiko (とほみこ きみこ, Tohomiko Kimiko; voiced by Grey DeLisle) is the Xiaolin Dragon of Fire, who originates from Tokyo, Japan. Her Wudai Weapon is the Arrow Sparrow, and her elemental Shen Gong Wu is the Cat's Eye Draco. Kimiko has a short temper, but has the potential to be extremely focused and ignore outer, annoying distractions. This is evidenced when she wields the Tangle Web Comb, which is said to require great concentration.
- Raimundo Pedrosa (voiced by Tom Kenny) is the Xiaolin Dragon of Wind, who originates from Rio de Janeiro, Brazil. He is stubborn and self-centered but is highly protective of his friends. Raimundo is street-smart and the group's self-proclaimed rebel. He is the last of the four Monks to reach Apprentice rank and, in the finale, becomes the first to be promoted to Shoku Warrior, a rank the other Monks would not attain until the sequel series. His Wudai Weapon is the Blade of the Nebula, and his elemental Shen Gong Wu is the Crest of the Condor.
- Clay Bailey (voiced by Jeff Bennett) is the Xiaolin Dragon of Earth, who originates from Texas, United States. A young cowboy, his large size and sensible demeanor belie his good-humored and gentle nature. Clay also has a younger sister named Jessie, who is an outlaw and leader of the Black Vipers. His Wudai Weapon is the Big Bang Meteorang, and his elemental Shen Gong Wu is the Longhorn Taurus.
- Dojo Kanojo Cho (voiced by Wayne Knight) is a small Chinese dragon and the Xiaolin warriors' companion who can transform into a full-sized 40-foot dragon. Dojo is often seen around Clay in the show; hanging around his arm, sitting on his shoulder or inside his cowboy hat, or around Omi, Raimundo, Kimiko and Master Fung.
- Master Fung (凤, voiced by René Auberjonois in season 1 and Maurice LaMarche in seasons 2–3) is the master of the Xiaolin Temple and mentor to the Xiaolin Warriors. Calm and collected, he rarely ever engages in combat, but in the rare occasions where he does, he is shown to be exceptionally formidable.
- Jack Spicer (voiced by Danny Cooksey) is a young inventor and self-proclaimed "evil boy genius" who freed Wuya from her prison and aids her in her attempts to conquer the world. Jack has aided the Xiaolin Warriors on occasion, but always winds up back on the evil side. His preferred Shen Gong Wu is the Monkey Staff, which is the only Shen Gong Wu he is left with at the end of the series.
- Wuya (voiced by Susan Silo) is a 1500-year-old Heylin witch who was previously defeated by the original Xiaolin warriors and imprisoned in a magical puzzle box, destroying her body. In the present, Jack Spicer frees Wuya but is unable to restore her body. Wuya eventually restores herself using the Serpent's Tail and the Reversing Mirror.
- Chase Young (voiced by Jason Marsden) is a villain who was introduced in the second season as an even bigger evil threat than Jack. He himself was turned to the Heylin side when Hannibal Bean convinced him to drink the Lao Mang Long Soup in return for eternal youth. Chase controls an army of cat-like warriors and has the ability to shapeshift into a Komodo dragon-like creature.

=== Supporting characters ===
- Master Monk Guan (關, voiced by Jeff Bennett) is a legendary tai chi master who has traveled the world a dozen times, and has defeated many opponents using only his famous Spear of Guan, which was later given to Omi. Guan has a temple on a cliffside near the ocean, where the young monks stay and store Shen Gong Wu while he trains them.
- Grandmaster Dashi (大師, voiced by Tom Kenny) is an ancient Xiaolin monk who imprisoned Wuya in a puzzle box 1,500 years prior.
- Hannibal Roy Bean (voiced by Tom Kenny) is a bean-shaped demon with a southern accent who spends his time plotting evil and world domination. He is first shown imprisoned in the Ying-Yang world by Chase Young, but tricks the Xiaolin warriors into releasing him. Bean occasionally wears robotic armor to appear more intimidating.
- Jermaine (voiced by Lee Thompson Young) is a kid from New York City who befriends Omi and later becomes a Xiaolin Monk.
- Chucky Choo (voiced by Maurice LaMarche) is a con dragon and an old friend-turned-enemy of Dojo Kanojo Cho.

=== Enemies ===
- Ashley (Katnappé) (voiced by Jennifer Hale) is a cat-themed thief and ally of the Heylin. She is first seen attending one of Jack's parents' parties, in which she came down to the basement, meeting Jack and Wuya, commenting on how she has an interest in evil. She later accepted a bigger role as an ally of Jack and Wuya, though she would frequently betray them for her own ambitions.
- Le Mime is a French mime who can create invisible constructs by miming.
- Tubbimura (voiced by Maurice LaMarche) is a large ninja who attempts to retrieve the Sword of the Storm to join the Heylin.
- Cyclops (voiced by Jeff Bennett) is a cyclops who Wuya and Jack Spicer hire to steal Shen Gong Wu.
- Vlad (voiced by Tom Kenny) is a Russian vendor and ally of the Heylin.
- Pandabubba (voiced by Kevin Michael Richardson) is an aspiring crime boss from Hong Kong.
- Gigi (voiced by Jeff Bennett) is a living flower who can transform others into plants.
- Chameleon-Bot is Jack Spicer's greatest robot creation.
- Raksha (voiced by Maurice LaMarche) is a living snowman who was created after Jack Spicer's Dude-Bot discarded the Heart of Jong into a snowy chasm.
- Dyris (voiced by Grey DeLisle) is a mermaid who assumes a monstrous form outside water.
- The Sapphire Dragon is a dragon-like Shen Gong Wu that can transform others into obedient sapphire minions. Following its first appearance in "Night of the Sapphire Dragon", it returns in "Dream Stalker", where Hannibal Roy Bean infuses it with the Shadow of Fear and sends it to attack Raimundo in his dreams.

== Episodes ==
Season	Episodes	Originally released	
Season	Episodes	First released	Last released
1	13	November 1, 2003	May 15, 2004
2	26	September 11, 2004	May 21, 2005
3	13	September 17, 2005	May 13, 2006

== Production ==
Xiaolin Showdown was created by Christy Hui and co-produced by executive producer Sander Schwartz, supervising producer Eric Radomski and producers Bill Motz and Bob Roth and composed by Kevin Manthei, it was additionally developed by Warner Bros. Animation. The first episode of Xiaolin Showdown was developed over three years following its conception, and premiered November 1, 2003.

Series creator Christy Hui has stated that despite the growing popularity of anime in the United States, she preferred to create a show that was a "fusion of Eastern and Western culture". Xiaolin Showdown shows subtle influences of Eastern art, action, and philosophy, but also includes very Western characters and humor. Dong Yang Animation Co., LTD, Digital eMation, and Lotto Animation contributed some of the animation for this series.

Following the success of its first season, a 26-episode season 2 was ordered. A third season would follow, resulting in 3 seasons and 52 episodes. The series received promotion in other media, including a trading card game and a video game.

The series was followed by Xiaolin Chronicles, which premiered on August 26, 2013. Prior to the series' announcement Tara Strong, Grey DeLisle, and creator Christy Hui hinted at its production.

== Reception ==
=== Critical reception ===
Xiaolin Showdown was a huge hit for the Kids' WB network, and it ranked at the no. 1 position against all other Saturday morning competition mainly between kids aged 6–14.

=== Awards and nominations ===
Year	Award	Category	Nominee	Result	Ref.
2004	31st Annie Awards	Outstanding Character Design in an Animated Television Production	Matt Danner for Xiaolin Showdown	Nominated	
2004	31st Daytime Emmy Awards	Outstanding Sound Editing — Live Action and Animation	Tom Syslo, Timothy J. Borquez, Eric Freeman, Mark A. Keatts, Mark Keefer, Kerry Brody	Nominated	
2005	32nd Daytime Emmy Awards	Outstanding Sound Editing — Live Action and Animation	Thomas Syslo, Timothy J. Borquez, Daisuke Sawa, Doug Andham, Eric Freeman, Roy Braverman, Jeff Hutchins, Brian F. Mars, Mark Howlett, Mark Keatts, Mark Keefer, Kerry Iverson and Mike Garcia	Won	
2005	52nd Annual Golden Reel Awards	Best Sound Editing in Television: Animated	Dreamscape	Nominated	
2006	33rd Daytime Emmy Awards	Outstanding Sound Editing — Live Action and Animation	Timothy J. Borquez, Thomas Syslo, Daisuke Sawa, Doug Andham, Eric Freeman, Mark Keatts, Mike Garcia, Mark Keefer, Chuck Smith and Mark Howlett	Nominated	
2007	34th Daytime Emmy Awards	Outstanding Sound Editing — Live Action and Animation	Daisuke Sawa, Timothy J. Borquez, Thomas Syslo, Doug Andham, Eric Freeman, Mark Keatts, Mark Keefer and Mike Garcia	Nominated	

== In other media ==
=== Home media ===
Warner Bros. released a two-disc Season 1 DVD on February 20, 2007. On January 10, 2017, after Amazon acquired the rights to produce home media releases for the series, both a reprint of the Season 1 DVD and a complete Season 2 DVD were released in manufacture-on-demand format. On April 11, 2017, Season 3 was also given a manufacture-on-demand release.

All seasons of Xiaolin Showdown as well as the spin-off series Xiaolin Chronicles are available on Amazon Prime Video and iTunes in high definition.

=== Trading card game ===
Wizards of the Coast released a now out-of-print trading card game based on the series in 2005.

=== Video game ===
Konami developed a Xiaolin Showdown video game that was released on November 14, 2006, for PlayStation 2, PlayStation Portable, Xbox, and Nintendo DS.

== Successor series ==
On September 14, 2013, a successor series, Xiaolin Chronicles, premiered. Chronicles features a new ally of the main characters named Ping Pong as they continue their fight against Wuya, Jack Spicer and Chase Young along with a new nemesis named Shadow.
