= List of Hey Arnold! episodes =

Hey Arnold! is an American animated sitcom created by Craig Bartlett that aired on Nickelodeon from October 7, 1996, to June 8, 2004. The series centers on a fourth grader named Arnold Shortman, who lives with his grandparents in an inner-city boarding house. A total of 100 episodes aired over the course of five seasons. Hey Arnold!: The Movie, a feature-length film based on the series, was released theatrically on June 28, 2002. Hey Arnold!: The Jungle Movie, a television film based on the series, premiered on November 24, 2017, on Nickelodeon.

== Series overview ==
Season	Segments	Episodes	Originally released	
Season	Segments	Episodes	First released	Last released
Pilot			July 10, 1996 (cinemas)	
1	38	20	October 7, 1996	February 12, 1997
2	37	19	September 22, 1997	December 1, 1997
3	38	20	August 31, 1998	March 8, 1999
4	35	19	March 10, 1999	March 11, 2000
5	37	22	March 18, 2000	June 8, 2004
Hey Arnold!: The Movie			June 28, 2002	
Hey Arnold!: The Jungle Movie			November 24, 2017	

== Episodes ==
=== Claymation shorts (1988–90) ===
Before the main series premiered, Craig Bartlett created three clay animation short films:

- Arnold Escapes From Church (1988)
- The Arnold Waltz (1990)
- Arnold Rides His Chair (1990) (shown on Sesame Street)

They featured four characters from Hey Arnold!: Arnold, Helga, Harold, and Rhonda.

=== Pilot (1996) ===
Title	Directed by	Written by	Storyboard by	Original release date
"Arnold"	Craig Bartlett	Craig Bartlett, Joe Ansolabehere, & Steve Viksten	Tuck Tucker & Craig Bartlett	July 10, 1996 (cinemas)
Arnold accidentally knocks Harold out during a baseball game, and he gives Arnold 24 hours to live before he beats him to a pulp. Note: The plot for the pilot was later used in Season 1, Episode 17b, "24 Hours to Live." The pilot was also shown as a theatrical short before the 1996 Nickelodeon film, Harriet the Spy, but not being released on home video on February 25, 1997, for the first version, and also not being officially released on home video until November 20, 2018, on the Hey Arnold!: The Ultimate Collection DVD set. It also aired once as part of Nick in the Afternoon.

=== Season 1 (1996–97) ===
No. overall	No. in season	Title (Note: Alternate titles for episodes from the first three seasons are sourced from archived Nickelodeon and YTV episode guides.)	Directed by	Written by	Storyboard by	Original release date	Prod. code	U.S. households (millions)
1	1	"Downtown as Fruits"	Tuck Tucker & Larry Leichliter	Craig Bartlett, Joe Ansolabehere, & Steve Viksten	Tuck Tucker (director); John Mathot	October 7, 1996	001	2.36
1	1	"Eugene's Bike"	Kelly James & Juli Murphy-Hashiguchi	Steve Viksten, Joe Ansolabehere, & Craig Bartlett	Kelly James (director); Tricia Garcia	October 7, 1996	001	2.36
"Downtown as Fruits": Arnold and Gerald are cast as fruits in the school play directed by Helga, but when they get tired of her bossing them around, they skip out on the play and take a bus ride downtown. "Eugene's Bike": Arnold accidentally destroys Eugene's brand new bike, so he tries to make it up to Eugene by taking him out on a day of fun, but clumsy Eugene keeps getting into accidents.
2	2	"The List"	Mark O'Hare & Larry Leichliter	Joe Ansolabehere	Mark O'Hare (director); Derek Drymon & John McIntyre	October 9, 1996	008	2.17
2	2	"Haunted Train"	Tuck Tucker & Juli Murphy-Hashiguchi	Josie Nericcio	Tuck Tucker (director); John Mathot	October 9, 1996	008	2.17
"The List": Arnold attempts to do everything on the legendary "List for a Kid's Perfect Saturday", but all of his plans go horribly wrong when there is no good cereal in the boarding house, the TV set breaks down, and the hill to skate down is being repaired. "Haunted Train": On a boring summer night, Grandpa Phil tells Arnold and his friends the tale of "The Haunted Train". Curiosity gets the best of Arnold, Gerald, and Helga, so the three go to the abandoned railroad tracks to look for it.
3	3	"Operation Ruthless" "Operation: Ruthless"	Kelly James & Larry Leichliter	Rachel Lipman & Steve Viksten	Kelly James (director); Tricia Garcia	October 14, 1996	007	2.18
3	3	"The Vacant Lot"	Mark O'Hare & Larry Leichliter	Josie Nericcio	Mark O'Hare (director); Derek Drymon	October 14, 1996	007	2.18
"Operation Ruthless": Helga attempts to sabotage Arnold's chances of spending time with Ruth McDougal, a sixth grader to whom he is attracted, while at the annual city Cheese Fair. "The Vacant Lot": Arnold and his friends clean up a dirty lot to play baseball on, but when the adults find the lot, they take it over and use it for their own reasons.
4	4	"6th Grade Girls"	Dan Povenmire & Juli Murphy-Hashiguchi	Steve Viksten	Dan Povenmire (director); Debbie Baber & Sherm Cohen	October 16, 1996	005	2.35
4	4	"The Baseball" "Baseball"	Dan Povenmire & Dale Case	Joe Ansolabehere	Dan Povenmire (director); Sherm Cohen	October 16, 1996	005	2.35
"6th Grade Girls": Sixth grade girls Connie and Maria invite Arnold and Gerald to their school dance, but little do they know that Connie and Maria are using them to make their boyfriends jealous. "The Baseball": Arnold's baseball idol, Mickey Kaline, is about to retire, so Arnold and Gerald go to Mickey's final game. Guest star: Ron Perlman as Mickey Kaline
5	5	"Benchwarmer"	Stark Howell & Steve Socki	Jonathan Greenberg	Stark Howell (director); Tricia Garcia	October 21, 1996	011	2.35
5	5	"Cool Jerk"	Rob Porter & Larry Leichliter	Joe Ansolabehere	Rob Porter (director); Cullen Blaine	October 21, 1996	011	2.35
"Benchwarmer": Arnold and his friends play on a basketball team led by Coach Wittenburg, but he tells the team to pass the ball to one kid only – his son, Tucker. "Cool Jerk": A cool older boy named Frankie G. befriends Arnold, but Arnold soon realizes that Frankie G. only befriended him in order to help with a break-in.
6	6	"The Little Pink Book" "The Little Pink Book Catastrophe!!!"	Bert Ring & Don Judge	Craig Bartlett	Bert Ring (director)	October 23, 1996	002	2.43
6	6	"Field Trip"	Debbie Baber & Steve Socki	Joe Ansolabehere, Steve Viksten, & Craig Bartlett	Debbie Baber (director)	October 23, 1996	002	2.43
"The Little Pink Book": Helga's diary is full of poems and shrines of Arnold. Arnold and Gerald find the diary and take it to Arnold's house to determine whose diary it is. The only place Helga signed her name in the book is on the last page, and she must get it back before Arnold sees her name, even if it means spending the night in Arnold's closet. "Field Trip": While on a field trip to the aquarium, Arnold sees Lockjaw, a neglected, graffiti-covered old turtle, and Arnold feels bad for it, so later that night, Arnold and Grandma sneak into the aquarium and set Lockjaw free.
7	7	"Tutoring Torvald"	Sherm Cohen & Larry Leichliter	Joe Ansolabehere	Sherm Cohen & Dan Povenmire (directors); Mark O'Hare & Stark Howell	October 28, 1996	013	2.09
7	7	"Gerald Comes Over"	Bert Ring & Juli Murphy-Hashiguchi	Craig Bartlett & Rachel Lipman	Bert Ring (director); Debbie Baber, Sherm Cohen, & Dean Yeagle	October 28, 1996	013	2.09
"Tutoring Torvald": Arnold must tutor 13-year-old Torvald, fourth-grade bully in math, much to his dismay. "Gerald Comes Over": Gerald visits Arnold's boarding house and meets the eccentric boarders.
8	8	"Arnold's Hat"	Tuck Tucker & Larry Leichliter	Steve Viksten	Tuck Tucker (director); John Mathot	October 30, 1996	003	2.06
8	8	"Stoop Kid"	Kelly James & Juli Murphy-Hashiguchi	Steve Viksten	Kelly James (director); Tricia Garcia	October 30, 1996	003	2.06
"Arnold's Hat": Helga steals Arnold's hat to complete her secret shrine — a statue in the shape of his (Arnold's) head made from Arnold-chewed bubble gum. Arnold feels like he is nothing without his hat, so Helga is planning to return it to him — until her mother throws it in the trash, which is on its way to the dump. "Stoop Kid": While playing football on the street, Arnold kicks the ball and it ends up on Stoop Kid's stoop. According to Gerald, Stoop Kid is a teenage boy who has been living on that particular stoop ever since he was born. Arnold tries to wait for him to leave so he can get his football back, but learns that he never leaves his stoop. Faced with this fact, he tries to convince Stoop Kid to overcome his habit by taking a step off the stoop.
9	9	"Heat"	Tuck Tucker & Juli Murphy-Hashiguchi	Jonathan Greenberg	Tuck Tucker (director); John Mathot	November 4, 1996	006	2.53
9	9	"Snow"	Bert Ring & Steve Socki	Craig Bartlett & Rachel Lipman	Bert Ring (director); Debbie Baber	November 4, 1996	006	2.53
"Heat": A heat wave engulfs the city, and Arnold and Gerald try to find ways to beat the heat. "Snow": A snowstorm comes to the city. Arnold's Grandpa tries to teach him work ethic while his friends play without him.
10	10	"Helga's Makeover"	Kelly James & Juli Murphy-Hashiguchi	Rachel Lipman	Kelly James (director); Tricia Garcia	November 6, 1996	004	2.65
10	10	"The Old Building"	Kelly James & Jamie Mitchell	Rachel Lipman & Steve Viksten	Kelly James (director); Tricia Garcia	November 6, 1996	004	2.65
"Helga's Makeover": Due to her tomboyish nature, Helga is the only girl who is not invited to Rhonda's slumber party. Feeling left out, she gives herself a makeover, and goes to it anyway. "The Old Building": Arnold is caught in the middle when Grandma and Ernie argue about whether an old theater should be torn down or not.
11	11	"Mugged"	Tuck Tucker & Jamie Mitchell	Craig Bartlett	Tuck Tucker (director); Derek Drymon	November 11, 1996	009	2.46
11	11	"Roughin' It"	Sherm Cohen & Alan Smart	Jonathan Greenberg	Sherm Cohen (director); Frank Nissen	November 11, 1996	009	2.46
"Mugged": Arnold learns the secrets of self-defense from his Grandma after getting held up by a thug. He realizes his skills are getting out of hand when he beats up an innocent man. "Roughin' It": Grandpa takes Arnold and Gerald on a weekend camping trip. As they set up the campsite, Big Bob, Helga, and Phoebe show up in a high-tech RV to rough it as well. Then, as everyone hikes up a mountain trail while exploring the great outdoors, they get lost in the wilderness. Arnold and Gerald agree to help everyone find their way back to their campsite by using Grandpa's survival tips.
12	12	"Door #16" "Door 16"	Stark Howell & Dale Case	Rachel Lipman	Stark Howell (director); Tricia Garcia	November 13, 1996	010	2.47
12	12	"Arnold as Cupid"	Dan Povenmire & Dale Case	Steve Viksten	Dan Povenmire (director); Debbie Baber	November 13, 1996	010	2.47
"Door #16": Arnold is given a package, which is for the mysterious Mr. Smith. Meanwhile, all of the boarders become curious about figuring out what is contained in it. Now, Arnold and Gerald try to make a safe delivery while searching all over the city for Mr. Smith so they can give it to him. "Arnold as Cupid": After getting into an argument with Suzie over money, Oskar is kicked out of his room in the boarding house. Feeling rejected by her, he tries to find a new room to sleep in, but no one agrees to it. Then, with no other option, he decides to move into Arnold's room. Soon, Arnold becomes tired of Oskar sleeping in his room, not letting him get any sleep, and gambling away his possessions, so Arnold plays Cupid to try to put Oskar and Suzie's relationship together again.
13	13	"Das (The) Subway" "Das Subway"	Tuck Tucker & Steve Socki	Chris Simmons	Tuck Tucker (director); John Mathot & Cullen Blaine	November 18, 1996	012	N/A
13	13	"Wheezin' Ed"	Dan Povenmire & Juli Murphy-Hashiguchi	Craig Bartlett, Rachel Lipman & Steve Viksten	Dan Povenmire (director); Debbie Baber	November 18, 1996	012	N/A
"Das (The) Subway": The gang encounters trouble while traveling on the subway. "Wheezin' Ed": The gang travels to Elk Island to find a pirate treasure said to be haunted by a gangster with a breathing problem.
14	14	"Pigeon Man"	Jamie Mitchell & Larry Leichliter	Joseph Purdy	Jamie Mitchell (director); Melissa Suber, Jay Lender, & Dan Kubat	November 20, 1996	014	2.26
14	14	"Spelling Bee" "The Spelling Bee"	Frank Nissen & Steve Socki	Joe Ansolabehere	Frank Nissen (director); Derek Drymon	November 20, 1996	014	2.26
"Pigeon Man": Arnold confronts a man that has known and trusted pigeons all his life after Arnold's pigeon gets sick. The man has not been around other humans for many years, as he feels he cannot trust them. When Arnold takes him for a day in the city, Harold and his friends come along and accidentally destroy Pigeon Man's bird cages trying to make simple mischief. Guest star: Vincent Schiavelli as Pigeon Man "Spelling Bee": Arnold competes in a Tri-City spelling bee to win money for a keyboard, but faces competition against Helga, who is being pushed by her father to win so she can follow in her sister's footsteps.
15	15	"Olga Comes Home"	Stark Howell & Larry Leichliter	Steve Viksten	Stark Howell (director); Tricia Garcia	November 25, 1996	015	2.49
15	15	"Sally's Comet"	Dan Povenmire & Howy Parkins	Joseph Purdy	Dan Povenmire (director); Sherm Cohen	November 25, 1996	015	2.49
"Olga Comes Home": Jealous about her smart, talented, beautiful and popular older sister Olga returning home from college, Helga fiendishly changes one of her grades from an A to B+, which sends Olga into a deep depression. "Sally's Comet": Arnold and Gerald mail in cereal box tops to receive a telescope so they can see the well-known interstellar event known as Sally's Comet. The problem is that it is too bright for them to see the stars. Now they try to convince everybody in the city to turn off their lights.
16	16	"Abner, Come Home!" "Abner Come Home"	Cullen Blaine & Howy Parkins	Joe Ansolabehere	Cullen Blaine (director); Rob Porter	November 27, 1996	016	2.05
16	16	"The Sewer King"	Tuck Tucker & Alan Smart	Keith Kaczorek	Tuck Tucker (director); Derek Drymon & Kelly James	November 27, 1996	016	2.05
"Abner, Come Home!": Abner, Arnold's beloved pet pig, sees a cat out the window and he runs out of the boarding house to chase it, which leads to him running far away from home. The next morning, Arnold wakes up to realize that Abner is gone. Later, he announces a search party so everyone can help find Abner before something bad happens to him. "The Sewer King": While Arnold goes out to bring Grandpa his golden pocket watch back from the store, he sees a gigantic hole being dug for new sewer pipes at a construction site. As he looks down it, the watch falls out of his pocket and into the sewer. Now, Arnold and Gerald must go down there to retrieve it, only to find that it is in possession of the Sewer King.
17	17	"Magic Show"	Dan Povenmire & Juli Murphy-Hashiguchi	Glen David Gold	Dan Povenmire (director); Sherm Cohen	December 9, 1996	018	2.53
17	17	"24 Hours to Live" "Twenty-Four Hours to Live"	Craig Bartlett & Larry Leichliter	Craig Bartlett, Steve Viksten, & Joe Ansolabehere	Craig Bartlett (director); Tuck Tucker, Derek Drymon, & Dan Povenmire	December 9, 1996	018	2.53
"Magic Show": Arnold picks Helga for his disappearing act, but when Helga decides to run off to trick Arnold, she knocks herself out and dreams of a world where no one misses her now that she is gone. "24 Hours to Live": In this remake of the pilot episode, Arnold accidentally knocks Harold out during a baseball game, and he gives Arnold 24 hours to live before he beats him to a pulp. Note: Season 1, Episode 17b was shown as a home video short before the 1996 Nickelodeon film, Harriet the Spy, being released on November 16, 1997, for the second version.
18	18	"Arnold's Christmas" "The Christmas Show"	Jamie Mitchell	Story by : Craig Bartlett, Steve Viksten, & Joe Ansolabehere; Written by : Steve Viksten	Tuck Tucker, Stark Howell, Jamie Mitchell, & Kelly James (directors); Derek Drymon, Tricia Garcia, Kelly James & Rob Porter	December 11, 1996	020	2.42
Arnold tries to find Mr. Hyunh's daughter (who was separated from him during the final days of the Vietnam War) as he carries out his duty as Mr. Hyunh's secret Santa. The only man who can help them agrees, only if Arnold and Gerald do all of his Christmas shopping for him. Meanwhile, Helga must choose between a Christmas present for herself (Nancy Spumoni boots) and the perfect gift for Arnold.
19	19	"False Alarm"	Kelly James & George Chialtas	Rachel Lipman & Steve Viksten	Chris Savino (director); Chris Robertson	December 23, 1996	017	2.39
19	19	"World Records"	Kelly James & George Chialtas	Joe Ansolabehere	Kelly James (director); Stark Howell	December 23, 1996	017	2.39
"False Alarm": Eugene is framed for pulling the fire alarm at school. Arnold interrogates his friends in a makeshift courtroom in the library to discover the real culprit. "World Records": Arnold and his friends try to get into the Guinness Book of Records.
20	20	"Arnold's Valentine"	Jamie Mitchell	Steve Viksten & Rachel Lipman	Tuck Tucker & Stark Howell (directors); Derek Drymon & Rob Porter	February 12, 1997	025	2.80
On Valentine's Day, Arnold manages to arrange two dates; one with Ruth, the sixth grader he likes, and one with his French pen pal Cecile (actually Helga in disguise) – only for the real Cecile to suddenly appear on a surprise visit, and Arnold to discover what Ruth is really like, as she mistakes Arnold for a busboy and talks only about herself.

=== Season 2 (1997) ===
No. overall	No. in season	Title	Directed by	Written by	Storyboard by	Original release date	Prod. code	U.S. households (millions)
21	1	"Save the Tree"	Dan Povenmire	Joseph Purdy	Dan Povenmire (director); Sherm Cohen	September 22, 1997	038	3.08
21	1	"New Teacher"	Dan Povenmire	Joseph Purdy	Dan Povenmire (director); Sherm Cohen	September 22, 1997	038	3.08
"Save the Tree": Arnold and the gang must stop Big Bob from chopping down the oldest tree in town. "New Teacher": When the kids make their new teacher, Mr. Simmons, quit his job, the replacement makes them realize what they lost. Note: This is the first appearance of the new teacher, Mr. Simmons, and General Sgt. Goose. The portion of "Save the Tree" after Arnold leaves his bed was made to be viewed in ChromaDepth 3D as part of Nickelodeon's "3D NoggleVision" event.
22	2	"Helga's Love Potion" "Helga's Love Potion–3D"	Dan Povenmire	Craig Bartlett	Dan Povenmire (director); Sherm Cohen	September 24, 1997	035	2.87
22	2	"Gerald's Secret"	Tuck Tucker	Jonathan Greenberg	Tuck Tucker (director); Jay Lender	September 24, 1997	035	2.87
"Helga's Love Potion": Helga drinks a potion to lose all of her feelings for Arnold. "Gerald's Secret": Gerald's secret is revealed; he does not know how to ride a bike, so Arnold tries to teach him how. Note: Helga's dream sequence in "Helga's Love Potion" was made to be viewed in ChromaDepth 3D as part of Nickelodeon's "3D NoggleVision" event.
23	3	"The Big Scoop" "Big Scoop"	Stark Howell	Joseph Purdy	Stark Howell (director); Christopher Morley	September 29, 1997	027	2.63
23	3	"Harold's Kitty"	Steve Socki	Jordana Arkin & Steve Viksten	Tricia Garcia (director); Tim Parsons	September 29, 1997	027	2.63
"The Big Scoop": Arnold and Gerald compete against Helga in the school newspaper, but they find out that Helga is adding fake information for her newspaper. When one story begins to frighten all the students, Arnold and Gerald do some investigating, and print the truth-exposing Helga's fabrications. "Harold's Kitty": Arnold and Harold rescue what they believe to be a stray kitten from the trashcan. As Arnold hangs up flyers, the mean and tough Harold forms a bond with the kitten, who ends up belonging to a grumpy old lady, Mrs. Ryle. When Harold refuses to give up the kitten, who he has named Cupcake, the police, Mrs. Ryle, and Harold's parents show up to take it back as Harold barricades himself in the house with the kitten. Note: This is first episode to feature Phillip Van Dyke as the voice for Arnold, as well as the first episode of the second season in production order.
24	4	"Longest Monday" "Trash Can Day"	Derek Drymon & Larry Leichliter	Story by : Megan Blumenreich; Written by : Jonathan Greenberg	Derek Drymon (director); Kurt Dumas	October 1, 1997	032B	2.50
24	4	"Eugene's Pet"	Derek Drymon & George Chialtas	Antoinette Stella	Derek Drymon (director); Kurt Dumas & Robert Porter	October 1, 1997	032A	2.50
"Longest Monday": Schoolyard tradition has it that on the first Monday of June each year, the fifth graders throw the fourth graders into trash cans. So, Arnold and Gerald try to make a run for it. As more people are thrown into trash cans and the fifth graders know all the routes, Arnold and Gerald find out eluding the fifth graders is harder that they thought. "Eugene's Pet": After Arnold accidentally kills Eugene's fish with a yo-yo, he must do something to make up for it. Note: This is the first appearances of Wolfgang, Edmund, Mickey the Weasel, and the other 5th graders. Wolfgang was voiced by Toran Caudell, who voiced Arnold in the first season.
25	5	"Monkey Business"	Tuck Tucker	Steve Viksten	Tuck Tucker (director); Jay Lender	October 6, 1997	030	2.83
25	5	"Big Caesar"	Dan Povenmire	Jonathan Rosenthal & Craig Bartlett	Sherm Cohen; Storyboard Director: Dan Povenmire	October 6, 1997	030	2.83
"Monkey Business": An organ grinder's monkey kisses Helga, who is convinced she has caught "monkeynucleosis." "Big Caesar": Arnold and Gerald do a spot of fishing, determined to catch the pond's biggest fish, the legendary "Big Caesar."
26	6	"Ransom"	Steve Socki	Jonathan Greenberg	Kelly James (director); Scott Shaw & Tim Parsons	October 8, 1997	029	2.39
26	6	"Ms. Perfect"	Steve Socki	Steve Viksten	Kelly James (director); Scott Shaw	October 8, 1997	029	2.39
"Ransom": Gerald and Arnold get on the case when Timberly's doll goes missing. "Ms. Perfect": Lila, the new girl, is disliked at school by Helga and the other girls for seeming to be absolutely perfect and a big hit with all the boys. The girls soon play a prank on Lila, causing paint to spill all over her in front of the school. They soon accept her after they see how upset she is and learn that her dad has been unemployed for some time, leading to the two having little to no food in the house. Note: This is the first appearances of Lila and Big Patty.
27	7	"Arnold Saves Sid"	Stark Howell	Steve Viksten	Stark Howell (director); Chris Robertson	October 13, 1997	028	2.31
27	7	"Hookey"	Steve Socki	Jim Ryan	Kelly James (director); Scott Shaw	October 13, 1997	028	2.31
"Arnold Saves Sid": After Arnold saves Sid from an injury, Sid devotes himself to paying Arnold back with unending kindness. "Hookey": Arnold and Gerald skip school, but their day is ruined by their fear of being found out.
28	8	"Freeze Frame"	Tuck Tucker	Joseph Purdy	Tuck Tucker (director); Jay Lender	October 15, 1997	034	2.58
28	8	"Phoebe Cheats"	Tuck Tucker	Story by : Danica Ivancevic; Written by : Antoinette Stella	Tuck Tucker (director); Derek Drymon	October 15, 1997	034	2.58
"Freeze Frame": Arnold and Gerald go around the city following "Porkpie", a mysterious man caught on film. They suspect, because of the clues, that Porkpie is planning to kill "Marty", who turns out to be Mr. Green. "Phoebe Cheats": In this variation of "The Tell-Tale Heart", Phoebe plagiarizes from a poetry book and uses one of the poems as her entry in a poetry contest. She wins, with her prize being a trophy resembling poet Emily Dickinson. Then, the trophy haunts Phoebe into confessing. Guest star: Carol Kane as Emily Dickinson trophy
29	9	"Mudbowl" "Mud Bowl"	Stark Howell	Jonathan Greenberg	Stark Howell (director); Chris Robertson	October 20, 1997	033	2.72
29	9	"Gerald Moves Out"	Stark Howell	Steve Viksten & Danica Ivancevic	Stark Howell (director); Chris Robertson	October 20, 1997	033	2.72
"Mudbowl": Wolfgang and his gang of fifth graders challenge Arnold and his friends to a football game, but he has to first persuade them that his plays are good enough for them to win. "Gerald Moves Out": Gerald, getting tired of his family bugging him, moves out of his home and into Arnold's boarding house, only to realize emancipation is not all it is cracked up to be.
30	10	"The High Life" "High Life"	Derek Drymon	Story by : Rachel Lipman; Written by : Lesa Kite	Derek Drymon (director); Kurt Dumas	October 22, 1997	031	2.01
30	10	"Best Friends"	Steve Socki	Jonathan Greenberg	Kelly James (also director)	October 22, 1997	031	2.01
"The High Life": Gerald becomes an entrepreneur out of selling watches until the market becomes saturated. "Best Friends": Rhonda and Nadine have a falling-out over working on a project at school, leaving Arnold to work with both of them separately. Arnold tries to bring the two best friends back together.
31	11	"Arnold's Halloween"	Jamie Mitchell	Craig Bartlett, Joseph Purdy & Antoinette Stella	Tuck Tucker & Kelly James (directors); Derek Drymon & Kurt Dumas	October 27, 1997	040	2.96
In a parody of the panic caused by Orson Welles' adaptation of "The War of the Worlds," the whole city mistakes a Halloween prank set up by Arnold and Gerald as an actual alien invasion.
32	12	"Steely Phil" "Chinese Checkers"	Stark Howell	Story by : Antoinette Stella; Written by : Steve Viksten	Stark Howell (director); Chris Robertson	October 29, 1997	036	N/A
32	12	"Quantity Time"	Steve Socki	Steve Viksten	Steve Socki (director); John Flagg	October 29, 1997	036	N/A
"Steely Phil": Arnold's Grandpa enters a Chinese Checkers tournament to reclaim his pride lost forty years ago. Note: Robby Fisher's name is a parody of Bobby Fischer. "Quantity Time": Helga's mother tries to let Helga and her father, Bob, bond after she learns the two of them will be home all week (as it's Spring Break for Helga). Miriam decides to take an impromptu vacation to her mother's, leaving father and daughter on their own-with Bob knowing nothing about his daughter.
33	13	"Eating Contest" "The Big Eat Off"	Steve Socki & Kelly James	Joseph Purdy	Kelly James (also director)	November 3, 1997	037	2.36
33	13	"Rhonda's Glasses"	Larry Leichliter	Antoinette Stella	George Chialtas (director); Rob Porter & Kurt Dumas	November 3, 1997	037	2.36
"Eating Contest": Arnold enters an eating contest. "Rhonda's Glasses": Rhonda gets glasses and finds out what it is like to be a "geek," the very people she judged and forced to sit in the back of the bus.
34	14	"Helga's Boyfriend"	Tuck Tucker & Larry Leichliter	Steve Viksten & Rachel Lipman	Tuck Tucker (director); Derek Drymon	November 5, 1997	021	2.40
34	14	"Crush on Teacher"	Stark Howell & George Chialtas	Joseph Purdy	Stark Howell (director); Rob Porter	November 5, 1997	021	2.40
"Helga's Boyfriend": Helga uses Stinky as her boyfriend to try to make Arnold jealous. "Crush on Teacher": Arnold becomes infatuated with Miss Felter, a substitute teacher, thinking she returns the feelings and that they are having dinner at her house. He later realizes that the one she invited was her fiancé, whose name is also Arnold. Guest star: Julia Louis-Dreyfus as Miss Felter
35	15	"Hall Monitor"	Kelly James & Steve Socki	Rachel Lipman	Kelly James (director); Tricia Garcia & Melissa Suber	November 10, 1997	022A	2.58
35	15	"Harold's Bar Mitzvah"	Dan Povenmire & Juli Murphy-Hashiguchi	Joseph Purdy	Dan Povenmire (director); Sherm Cohen	November 10, 1997	022A	2.58
"Hall Monitor": Phoebe becomes hall monitor and asks Helga for tips. She becomes overwhelmed by the "power" and soon everyone wants the old Phoebe back – even Helga, once she realizes Phoebe's also giving her detentions. "Harold's Bar Mitzvah": Harold runs away from his Bar Mitzvah, thinking he will retain his childhood this way. Guest star: Elliott Gould as Rabbi Goldberg
36	16	"Coach Wittenberg"	Stark Howell & Larry Leichliter	Jonathan Greenberg	Stark Howell (director); Rob Porter	November 12, 1997	023	N/A
36	16	"Four-Eyed Jack"	Tuck Tucker & George Chialtas	Story by : Danica Ivancevic; Written by : Craig Bartlett	Tuck Tucker (director); Derek Drymon	November 12, 1997	023	N/A
"Coach Wittenberg": Arnold and his friends get Coach Wittenberg to be their new bowling coach, but all he does is yell and make them do push-ups. It's learned that Helga's bowling team is coached by Tish Wittenberg, Coach Wittenberg's ex-wife (who he later remarries in "Best Man.") "Four-Eyed Jack": The ghost of a former boarding house resident is believed to have been causing strange occurrences in there when Arnold and Gerald find an old pair of glasses believing to have belonged to him.
37	17	"Eugene Goes Bad"	Tuck Tucker	Steve Viksten	Tuck Tucker (director); John Flagg	November 17, 1997	039	2.42
37	17	"What's Opera, Arnold?" "What's Opera?"	Dan Povenmire & Steve Socki	Craig Bartlett	Dan Povenmire (director); Sherm Cohen	November 17, 1997	039	2.42
"Eugene Goes Bad": After finding out that his idol is a rude, spoiled actor, Eugene sets out to become bad. "What's Opera, Arnold?": Helga and Arnold fall asleep during a field trip to the opera house and have their own "parody dream" of the opera Carmen.
38	18	"Tour de Pond"	Dan Povenmire & Juli Murphy-Hashiguchi	Rick Gitelson	Dan Povenmire (director); Sherm Cohen	November 24, 1997	024	N/A
38	18	"Teachers' Strike"	Kelly James & Steve Socki	Rachel Lipman & Joseph Purdy	Kelly James (director); Tricia Garcia & Melissa Suber	November 24, 1997	024	N/A
"Tour de Pond": Arnold and a descendant of his grandpa's arch enemy, Rex Smythe-Higgins, compete in a boat race. "Teachers' Strike": Teachers of Arnold's school go on strike because of inadequate funding; he and his friends are on cloud nine, only to find out that every lost school day will be taken from their summer vacation, and that their teachers have taken jobs at their favorite hangouts, turning fun into school.
39	19	"Runaway Float"	Rob Porter & Larry Leichliter	Jonathan Greenberg	Rob Porter (director); Cullen Blaine	December 1, 1997	019B	N/A
39	19	"Partners"	Dan Povenmire & Juli Murphy-Hashiguchi	Jonathan Greenberg & Steve Viksten	Dan Povenmire (director); Sherm Cohen	December 1, 1997	026B	N/A
"Runaway Float": After creating an idea for a parade float, Arnold is confident of it showing up in a parade. "Partners": A lounge singer moves into the Sunset Arms after renouncing his songwriter, who also moves there. Guest star: Harvey Korman as Don Reynolds Note: This was Toran Caudell's last episode to voice Arnold. "Partners" is the final episode of the first season in production order.

=== Season 3 (1998−99) ===
No. overall	No. in season	Title	Directed by	Written by	Storyboard by	Original release date	Prod. code	U.S. households (millions)
40	1	"Helga Blabs It All" "Helga Blabs All"	Tuck Tucker	Craig Bartlett	Tuck Tucker (director); Miyuki Hoshikawa	August 31, 1998	045	2.35
40	1	"Harold the Butcher"	Larry Leichliter & Stark Howell	Joseph Purdy	Stark Howell (director); Kurt Dumas	August 31, 1998	045	2.35
"Helga Blabs It All": While under the influence of laughing gas, Helga leaves a message on Arnold's answering machine confessing her love for him. When she finally comes to, she realizes that she has to get to Arnold's answering machine and delete the message before anyone else can hear it, encountering obstacles along the way. "Harold the Butcher": As punishment for shoplifting a ham (which he isn't even allowed to eat because he's Jewish), Harold is forced to work for Mr. Green at his butcher shop for a week.
41	2	"Dangerous Lumber"	Sherm Cohen & Frank Weiss	John D. Beck & Ron Hart	Sherm Cohen (director); Tim Parsons	September 2, 1998	047	2.57
41	2	"Mr. Hyunh Goes Country"	Stark Howell	Steve Viksten & Joseph Purdy	Stark Howell (director); Kurt Dumas & Chris Robertson	September 2, 1998	047	2.57
"Dangerous Lumber": Arnold has a lethal baseball bat swing, causing him to unintentionally knock out other players, so he decides never to play the sport again, mere days before a game against the fifth graders. "Mr. Hyunh Goes Country": Mr. Hyunh has a talent for country singing, so Arnold and Gerald, after recording a CD with him at the local studio, become his managers and make him a big star, much to his dislike. Their biggest gig is on-stage the Grand Ole Opry, Mr. Hyunh's favorite show. He must decide to become world famous and tour or not. Guest star: Ron Perlman as Mickey Kaline, Randy Travis as Mr. Hyunh's singing voice / Travis Randall
42	3	"Casa Paradiso"	Steve Socki	Joseph Purdy	Mark O'Hare (also director)	September 7, 1998	050	N/A
42	3	"Gerald's Tonsils"	Sherm Cohen & Frank Weiss	Craig Bartlett	Sherm Cohen (director); Tim Parsons & Chris Robertson	September 7, 1998	050	N/A
"Casa Paradiso": When an irritated Grandpa Phil decides to sell the boarding house to go live in a condo, Arnold and the boarders try to get him to change his mind. "Gerald's Tonsils": Days before the school's choir recital, Gerald gets a botched tonsillectomy that makes his voice deeper.
43	4	"Arnold's Room"	Tuck Tucker	Joseph Purdy	Tuck Tucker (director); Miyuki Hoshikawa	September 9, 1998	048	2.29
43	4	"Helga vs. Big Patty"	Steve Socki & Kelly James	Steve Viksten	Kelly James (also director)	September 9, 1998	048	2.29
"Arnold's Room": Sid pretends that Arnold's room is his room when he studies with Lorenzo, a rich classmate. "Helga vs. Big Patty": Sixth grade tough girl Big Patty challenges Helga to a fight after Helga cracks mean jokes about her.
44	5	"Stinky Goes Hollywood"	Tuck Tucker	Steve Viksten	Tuck Tucker (director); Miyuki Hoshikawa	September 14, 1998	043	2.36
44	5	"Olga Gets Engaged"	Dan Povenmire	Antoinette Stella	Dan Povenmire (director); Jay Lender	September 14, 1998	043	2.36
"Stinky Goes Hollywood": Stinky becomes the new Yahoo Soda poster child, until he discovers that he was hired as a joke. "Olga Gets Engaged": Helga's perfect sister, Olga, returns; this time, she's engaged to be married to a man named Doug who smooth-talks his way into letting Big Bob and Miriam marry their perfect daughter. While Helga wants nothing more than to see her sister crash and burn, she soon discovers that Doug has a mistress and is only marrying Olga to sponge off Big Bob by working at his beeper store and must choose to either let Olga ruin her life or stop the wedding from happening.
45	6	"Curly Snaps"	Steve Socki & Kelly James	Joseph Purdy	Kelly James (director); Chris Robertson	September 16, 1998	042	N/A
45	6	"Preteen Scream" "Pre-Teen Scream"	Dan Povenmire	Story by : Dawn Hershey & Michelle Lamoreaux; Written by : Joseph Purdy	Dan Povenmire (director); Jay Lender & Stephan Martiniere	September 16, 1998	042	N/A
"Curly Snaps": Curly locks himself in the principal's office after being skipped as Ball Monitor, the person who collects kick balls after recess. "Preteen Scream": Phoebe wins a chance to meet her favorite singer, Ronnie Matthews, and Helga comes along (despite that she doesn't like him)...but, during dinner at a diner, Helga warms up to Ronnie when he gushes about how he can do whatever he wants because of his fame and confesses that he doesn't write his own songs or even sing them. Guest star: Bronson Pinchot as Ronnie Matthews
46	7	"Grandpa's Birthday"	Sherm Cohen & Steve Socki	Story by : Craig Bartlett, Steve Viksten & Joe Ansolabehere; Written by : Craig Bartlett	Sherm Cohen (director); Tim Parsons & Chris Robertson	September 28, 1998	054	N/A
46	7	"Road Trip"	Tuck Tucker	Jonathan Greenberg	Tuck Tucker (director); Miyuki Hoshikawa	September 28, 1998	054	N/A
"Grandpa's Birthday": Grandpa thinks he's going to die when he turns 81 because of a "family curse"-every family member before him died at 81. He and Arnold spend the day before his 81st birthday doing all the things Grandpa's wanted to do. "Road Trip": When Bob has to go to a business meeting in Dallas, Miriam, and Helga are forced to go on the family road trip by themselves to South Dakota to see Helga's grandmother, which results in Miriam losing her purse, the directions and ends up wrecking the car.
47	8	"Sid's Revenge"	Dan Povenmire	Michelle Lamoreaux	Dan Povenmire (director); Jay Lender & Steve Lowtwait	October 7, 1998	053	2.30
47	8	"Roller Coaster"	Larry Leichliter & Christine Kolosov	Joseph Purdy	Larry Leichliter (director); Aldin Baroza, Carson Kugler, Ted Seko & Rick Hoberg	October 7, 1998	053	2.30
"Sid's Revenge": Sid swears vengeance with a voodoo doll made out of a bar of soap carved into the form of Principal Wartz for giving him detention for a prank he did not pull, and then believes that he killed him. "Roller Coaster": A roller coaster breaks down while Arnold and Eugene "The Jinx" are at the top of its tallest drop.
48	9	"The Aptitude Test" "Aptitude Test"	Stark Howell	Antoinette Stella	Stark Howell (director); Kurt Dumas	October 14, 1998	041	2.31
48	9	"Oskar Gets a Job"	Steve Socki & Kelly James	Steve Viksten	Kelly James (director); Chris Robertson	October 14, 1998	041	2.31
"The Aptitude Test": Thanks to an aptitude test mix-up, Helga thinks she's going to be dumb in the future and gives up on her dreams of being creative while Harold discovers that he's a genius. "Oskar Gets a Job": Oskar gets a job as a newspaper carrier to get money to payback a finance, but uses Arnold as cover for his laziness- making excuses as to why he cannot do his job.
49	10	"Arnold Betrays Iggy"	Dan Povenmire	Steve Viksten	Dan Povenmire (director); Jay Lender & Chris Robertson	October 19, 1998	046	N/A
49	10	"Helga and the Nanny"	Sherm Cohen & Steve Socki	Joseph Purdy	Sherm Cohen (director); Tim Parsons	October 19, 1998	046	N/A
"Arnold Betrays Iggy": Arnold gets in trouble for letting it slip that Iggy wears bunny pajamas, despite him never spreading the word to begin with. "Helga and the Nanny": Bob hires a nanny named Inga to help around the Pataki house, and Helga tries to get the nanny fired.
50	11	"Career Day"	Dan Povenmire	Jonathan Greenberg	Dan Povenmire (director); Jay Lender	October 21, 1998	049	N/A
50	11	"Hey Harold!" "Hey Harold"	Steve Socki & Kelly James	Steve Viksten	Kelly James (also director)	October 21, 1998	049	N/A
"Career Day": Arnold gets paired with the grouchy Jolly Olly Man as part of Career Day, while Helga gets paired with a police officer, Gerald with a fire fighter and Phoebe with Ernie at the demolition site. The other kids think it is the best job, as he gets to be around ice cream all day. Arnold helps the Jolly Olly man be nicer to his customers and please his boss, who happens to be his dad- whose just as grumpy. "Hey Harold!": Harold is invited to Rhonda's party, though he does not want to go as he thinks nobody will dance with him. While there, he dances with and befriends the female bully, Big Patty, who also had nobody to dance with. The two spend the next day together hanging out, much to the teasing of Stinky and Sid, who begin to tease him by saying he is smitten with her. They already tease Big Patty for being "big and dumb", which upsets Harold.
51	12	"Best Man"	Sherm Cohen & Christine Kolosov	Steve Viksten	Sherm Cohen (director); Tim Parsons & Chris Robertson	November 2, 1998	052	2.38
51	12	"Cool Party"	Dan Povenmire	Craig Bartlett	Dan Povenmire (director); Bob Foster, Jay Lender & Steve Lowtwait	November 2, 1998	052	2.38
"Best Man": Coach Wittenberg assigns Arnold the duty of best man at his second wedding to his ex-wife, Tish Wittenberg, while Helga is assigned to be the maid of honor. "Cool Party": Rhonda holds a cool-people-only party at her house. In retaliation, Arnold and his friends hold a "geek" party on the roof of his boarding house further up the street, leaving Rhonda's party deserted as the cool-party is boring and only about Rhonda.
52	13	"Arnold & Lila"	Steve Socki	Steve Viksten	Steve Socki (director); Mark O'Hare & Edgar Larrazabal	November 11, 1998	055	N/A
52	13	"Grand Prix"	Stark Howell & Larry Leichliter	Joseph Purdy	Stark Howell (director); Kurt Dumas & Celia Kendrick	November 11, 1998	055	N/A
"Arnold & Lila": Arnold gets more attention than he bargained for from Lila after Helga writes "Arnold Loves Lila" on the wall, first writing "Arnold Loves Helga," making the other girls believe Arnold wrote the graffiti. "Grand Prix": The kids compete in a grand prix race against each other.
53	14	"Arnold's Thanksgiving"	Larry Leichliter	Story by : Craig Bartlett, Steve Viksten, Joseph Purdy & Antoinette Stella; Written by : Craig Bartlett, Joseph Purdy & Steve Viksten	Kelly James & Tuck Tucker (directors); Kelly James, Chris Robertson & Caesar Martinez	November 18, 1998	056	2.51
Arnold and Helga are sick of their families' Thanksgiving traditions. Arnold's grandma confuses Thanksgiving with Fourth of July and vice versa, so his Thanksgiving meal consists of hotdogs and watching fireworks. When the others will not help him convince Gertie otherwise, he leaves. Helga is upset that her family ignores her, even on Thanksgiving, with Olga forcing everyone to help with the meal, then taking all the credit. Miriam ignores Helga's handmade centerpiece in favor of Olga's, and Big Bob just wants to watch the football game. Helga leaves when her family puts her down for having nothing to be thankful for. They meet and go to Mr. Simmons', only to realize that, compared to Thanksgiving with his family, theirs are not so bad after all. Arnold returns to a turkey and fireworks, Helga returns to a frantic family, who are on the phone with the police and making flyers to find her.
54	15	"Helga's Show"	Stark Howell	Steve Viksten	Stark Howell (director); Kurt Dumas	November 23, 1998	058	2.35
54	15	"The Flood"	Christine Kolosov	Antoinette Stella	Larry Leichliter (director); Kurt Dumas & Mark O'Hare	November 23, 1998	058	2.35
"Helga's Show": Helga's stand-up jokes about the kids in school offends them. "The Flood": The town is flooded, and Arnold's class is trapped in the school.
55	16	"Part Time Friends"	Stark Howell & Juli Murphy-Hashiguchi	Joseph Purdy	Stark Howell (director); Tricia Garcia & Kelly James	November 30, 1998	019A	N/A
55	16	"Biosquare" "Bio-Square"	Kelly James & Steve Socki	Jordana Arkin	Kelly James (director); Tricia Garcia & Melissa Suber	November 30, 1998	026A	N/A
"Part Time Friends": Arnold is okay with working with Gerald at Mrs. Vitello's flower shop after she's injured and puts Gerald in charge, but not with working for Gerald, which causes the friendship to hit a snag and Arnold quits. Note: This episode was released on the VHS of "Hey Arnold!: Partners" on July 28, 1998, before it aired on television. "Biosquare": As a science assignment, Arnold and Helga have to work together, and get along with each other, for 24 hours in the Sunset Arms greenhouse when they become locked inside.
56	17	"Phoebe Takes the Fall"	Larry Leichliter & Tuck Tucker	Joseph Purdy	Tuck Tucker (director); Sam Flemming, Miyuki Hoshikawa & Caesar Martinez	December 7, 1998	051	N/A
56	17	"The Pig War"	Dan Povenmire	Craig Bartlett	Dan Povenmire (director); Jay Lender & Steve Lowtwait	December 7, 1998	051	N/A
"Phoebe Takes the Fall": Helga demands that Phoebe lose a quiz competition to impress her competitive father. "The Pig War": Arnold, Grandpa, and friends reenact the Pig War. Note: "The Pig War" was inspired by an actual border conflict in Washington state's San Juan Islands in 1859.
57	18	"Crabby Author"	Sherm Cohen & Larry Leichliter	Steve L. Hayes	Sherm Cohen (director); Tim Parsons	December 28, 1998	044	N/A
57	18	"Rich Kid"	Larry Leichliter & Christine Kolosov	Joseph Purdy	Larry Leichliter (director); Mark O'Hare & Richard Walsh	December 28, 1998	044	N/A
"Crabby Author": While doing a school report on his favorite author, Agatha Caulfield, Arnold discovers that she's not as cheerful and whimsical as her stories. Guest star: Rose Marie as Agatha Caulfield "Rich Kid": Lorenzo, a neurotic rich kid, comes to P.S. 118. Note: Despite this being his introduction episode, Lorenzo had already appeared in various season 3 episodes predating this one, due to the series airing out of order.
58	19	"Girl Trouble"	Sherm Cohen & Frank Weiss	Story by : Sherm Cohen & Craig Bartlett; Written by : Craig Bartlett	Sherm Cohen (director); Tim Parsons	January 4, 1999	057	N/A
58	19	"School Dance"	Stark Howell	Steve Viksten	Stark Howell (director); Kurt Dumas	January 4, 1999	057	N/A
"Girl Trouble": Arnold snaps at school after Helga tries his patience once too often, causing him to pour paint on her after she pours some on him. He learns that Grandpa had a female bully at his age who was much like Helga. "School Dance": Arnold is in charge of the school dance. He books has-been singer Dino Spumoni, and when he sings a depressing "good-bye" song, all fingers point at Arnold, especially Rhonda and Helga.
59	20	"School Play"	Steve Socki	Steve Viksten	Kelly James & Dan Povenmire (directors); Kelly James, Jay Lender & Steve Lowtwait	March 8, 1999	059	2.61
After hearing that Arnold is Romeo in the school play of Romeo and Juliet, Helga does everything she can to get the part of Juliet and kiss him.

=== Season 4 (1999–2000) ===
No. overall	No. in season	Title	Animation Director(s)	Written by	Storyboard by	Original release date	Prod. code	Viewers (millions)
60	1	"Full Moon"	Frank Weiss	Steve Viksten	Mario Piluso (director); Kurt Dumas & Caesar Martinez	March 10, 1999	063	N/A
60	1	"Student Teacher" "Ms. Pataki, Student Teacher"	Frank Weiss	Michelle Lamoreaux & Steve Viksten	Chris Headrick (director); Chris Robertson	March 10, 1999	063	N/A
"Full Moon": Harold, Stinky and Sid accidentally frame Arnold for mooning Principal Wartz, despite him being an innocent bystander. "Student Teacher": Helga's sister Olga comes home for spring break and becomes a classroom aide in Helga's class, much to Helga's dismay. Note: This is the first episode to use digital ink and paint.
61	2	"Big Gino"	Christine Kolosov	Joseph Purdy	Tim Parsons (director); Carson Kugler	March 15, 1999	064	N/A
61	2	"Jamie O in Love" "Jamie O in Luv"	Christine Kolosov	Story by : Danica Ivancevic, Steve Viksten & Michelle Lamoreaux; Written by : Michelle Lamoreaux	Mike Svayko (director); Jay Lender	March 15, 1999	064	N/A
"Big Gino": After Sid works off a debt with loan shark Big Gino, the two become friends, but when Sid is told to give Arnold a swirlie, he has to choose between the two. "Jamie O in Love": Gerald's older brother Jamie O has a sudden burst of kindness when he finds a girlfriend, but Arnold and Gerald soon find out that the girl is just using Jamie O. Gerald is conflicted between telling his brother the truth, risking Jamie O to go back to his mean nature, or keeping it a secret and take advantage of his brother's kindness.
62	3	"Eugene's Birthday"	Christine Kolosov	Craig Bartlett	Sherm Cohen (director); Tim Parsons	March 17, 1999	061	2.55 (HH) (Note: (HH) denotes the amount of households that the episode was viewed in.)
62	3	"Stinky's Pumpkin"	Frank Weiss	Joseph Purdy	Mario Piluso (director); Kurt Dumas	March 17, 1999	061	2.55 (HH)
"Eugene's Birthday": After losing Eugene's birthday party invitations, Arnold feels obliged to throw him another party, but it does not work out. "Stinky's Pumpkin": Stinky grows a huge pumpkin to enter in a city competition to prove he's good at something, despite his family telling him nothing has grown on their land for years. Note: This is the first episode to feature Spencer Klein as the voice for Arnold, and also the first episode of the fourth season in production order.
63	4	"The Beeper Queen" "Pataki Role Reversal" "Beeper Queen"	Frank Weiss	Michelle Lamoreaux	Chris Headrick (director); Chris Robertson	March 29, 1999	065	2.23 (HH)
63	4	"Oskar Can't Read?" "Oskar Reads"	Frank Weiss	Joseph Purdy	Chris Headrick (director); Kurt Dumas & Ted Seko	March 29, 1999	065	2.23 (HH)
"The Beeper Queen": After Bob pops his spine, Miriam runs Big Bob's Beepers. At first the job turns her into an attentive mother, packing lunches for Helga, driving her to school, and helping her with homework. She soon gets in over her head and forgets about her family. Helga must help her come to her senses. "Oskar Can't Read?": Arnold finds out that Oskar is illiterate and tries to teach him to read. The final test is to take Oskar to the other side of town and he must find his way home, with only a map and written directions.
64	5	"Dinner for Four"	Frank Weiss	Steve Viksten	Chris Headrick (director); Chris Robertson	March 31, 1999	062	2.22 (HH)
64	5	"Phoebe Skips"	Christine Kolosov	Michelle Lamoreaux	Mike Svayko (director); Jay Lender	March 31, 1999	062	2.22 (HH)
"Dinner for Four": Helga wants to show Arnold that she can be as sophisticated as Lila is by taking him, Gerald, and Phoebe out to dinner with a coupon she won. She devises a plan to get out of paying when she discovers they're at the wrong restaurant. "Phoebe Skips": Phoebe is promoted to the sixth grade, but ignores Helga when she tells Phoebe that her new so-called "friends" are just using her to do their homework. She learns the hard way when a younger girl is also moved up to 6th grade, and her "friends" ditch Phoebe for the new girl. Phoebe runs crying to Helga, who welcomes Phoebe back and plots to get back at the older girls.
65	6	"Helga's Parrot"	Frank Weiss	Story by : Michelle Lamoreaux & Joseph Purdy; Written by : Antoinette Stella	Kurt Dumas (director); Caesar Martinez	April 5, 1999	067	N/A
65	6	"Chocolate Turtles"	Christine Kolosov	Craig Bartlett	Mike Svayko (director); Jay Lender & Miyuki Hoshikawa	April 5, 1999	067	N/A
"Helga's Parrot": A sleep-talking Helga confides into Bob's parrot about her love for Arnold. The next day, the parrot flies into Arnold's window, and it is up to Helga to get it. "Chocolate Turtles": Crisis strikes when Gerald's little sister, Timberly, eats a stock of chocolate turtles that he and Arnold are supposed to sell for a local scout organization.
66	7	"Love and Cheese" "Operation Lila-Less"	Frank Weiss	Steve Viksten	Mario Piluso (director); Kurt Dumas	April 7, 1999	068B	N/A
66	7	"Weighing Harold" "Fat Camp"	Christine Kolosov	Steve Viksten	Chris Robertson (director); Aldin Baroza & Miyuki Hoshikawa	April 7, 1999	068A	N/A
"Love and Cheese": Helga tries to separate Arnold from Lila while at the annual Cheese Fair. "Weighing Harold": Harold, after discovering his friends think he is obese, decides to go on a weight-loss cruise. When he comes back, though, he is noticeably larger.
67	8	"Back to School"	Frank Weiss	Story by : Joe Ansolabehere, Steve Viksten & Craig Bartlett; Written by : Craig Bartlett	Mario Piluso (director); Kurt Dumas & Caesar Martinez	September 11, 1999	072	N/A
67	8	"Egg Story" "The Egg"	Frank Weiss	Celia Bonaduce, Michelle Lamoreaux & Steve Viksten	Chris Headrick (director); Ted Seko	September 11, 1999	072	N/A
"Back to School": After Grandpa tells Arnold that he never got his grade school diploma, Arnold convinces him to come to go back to school at P.S. 118. "Egg Story": Arnold and Helga must care for an egg for a school project about parenting. Meanwhile, Rhonda and Harold are project partners and must also take care of an egg.
68	9	"It Girl"	Christine Kolosov	Jonathan Greenberg	Tim Parsons (director); Carson Kugler	September 18, 1999	069	N/A
68	9	"Deconstructing Arnold"	Frank Weiss	Michelle Lamoreaux	Chris Headrick (director); Ted Seko	September 18, 1999	069	N/A
"It Girl": Helga becomes a model, but she quits after she gets irritated at everyone dressing like her. "Deconstructing Arnold": Arnold's classmates are tired of constantly telling them the right thing to do, so he stops giving them advice. Nevertheless, when his classmates get into sticky situations, they are in desperate need of it. Guest star: Michael McKean as Johnny Stitches
69	10	"Grudge Match"	Frank Weiss	Joseph Purdy	Kurt Dumas (director); Caesar Martinez	September 25, 1999	070	N/A
69	10	"Polishing Rhonda"	Christine Kolosov	Michelle Lamoreaux	Tim Parsons (director); Carson Kugler	September 25, 1999	070	N/A
"Grudge Match": After getting in a car accident, Bob and Grandpa Phil face off on the golf green, with the loser having to pay for the damage to both cars. "Polishing Rhonda": Rhonda attends a finishing school after a fight with Big Patty, but is far from impressive with her snobby attitude. Realizing her name and money will not help her, she seeks help from fellow student Big Patty, who has been excelling in the school with her politeness and humble nature.
70	11	"Weird Cousin"	Christine Kolosov	Michelle Lamoreaux & Steve Viksten	Chris Robertson (director); Aldin Baroza & Miyuki Hoshikawa	October 9, 1999	073	N/A
70	11	"Baby Oskar"	Frank Weiss	Steve Viksten	Chris Headrick & Tuck Tucker (directors); Ted Seko	October 9, 1999	073	N/A
"Weird Cousin": Arnold's boring country cousin, Arnie, comes to visit. Lila immediately falls for him and them begin to spend time together, making Arnold jealous. Arnie however, has an interest in Helga. "Baby Oskar": Oskar has to take care of his infant cousin-in-law (also named Oskar), while his mother, Nancy is away. He complains about the baby getting all of Suzie's attention, which irritates her. When she is called off to work, it is Oskar's job to look after the infant. He begins to bond with the baby, and takes matters into his own hands when the baby appears ill.
71	12	"Grandpa's Sister"	Christine Kolosov	Craig Bartlett	Tim Parsons (director); Caesar Martinez	October 16, 1999	076B	N/A
71	12	"Synchronized Swimming"	Christine Kolosov	Joseph Purdy	Chris Robertson (director); Aldin Baroza & Miyuki Hoshikawa	October 16, 1999	076A	N/A
"Grandpa's Sister": Phil's twin sister, Mitzi comes for a visit, bringing along an unsettled conflict between them. "Synchronized Swimming": Arnold and the guys are part of a synchronized swimming team led by Coach Wittenburg. Guest Star: Phyllis Diller as Mitzi Shortman
72	13	"Helga Sleepwalks"	Christine Kolosov	Michelle Lamoreaux	Chris Robertson (director); Aldin Baroza & Miyuki Hoshikawa	October 23, 1999	074B	N/A
72	13	"Fighting Families"	Frank Weiss	Joseph Purdy	Chris Headrick (director); Ted Seko	October 23, 1999	074A	N/A
"Helga Sleepwalks": After eating pork rinds, Helga sleepwalks, uttering her secret about Arnold as she does so. "Fighting Families": Arnold, Grandpa, Grandma, Ernie and Mr. Hyunh compete on a game show against a "perfect" family from PS 119. Guest star: Ryan Seacrest as Fighting Families Host. Note: This episode was dedicated to Mike Bond, who died before this episode aired.
73	14	"Headless Cabbie" "Haunted Taxi"	Christine Kolosov	Joseph Purdy	Sherm Cohen (director); Tim Parsons	October 30, 1999	066B	3.25 2.24 (HH)
73	14	"Friday the 13th"	Christine Kolosov	Antoinette Stella	Mike Svayko (director); Jay Lender	October 30, 1999	066A	3.25 2.24 (HH)
"Headless Cabbie": Arnold tells an urban legend about a decapitated taxi driver. The gang goes out, only to find the details in the story are becoming real. "Friday the 13th": Arnold and Gerald try to prove superstitions are fictitious, only for it all to backfire on them.
74	15	"Veterans Day" "Veteran's Day Parts I & II" "Veteran's Day"	Christine Kolosov	Steve Viksten	Tim Parsons (director); Carson Kugler	November 6, 1999	071	N/A
Arnold's Grandpa recalls his adventures as a soldier in the Second World War, outwitting a regiment of Nazis, while Gerald's dad, Martin, remembers his own time serving in Vietnam. Gerald thinks his father is not a real hero, being just a file clerk, while Arnold believes Grandpa is telling another tall tale, especially after Grandpa is called out during his story for claiming he fought and beat up Hitler (which Grandpa does admit he made up). However, both boys are proven wrong when Arnold sees a statue dedicated to his grandpa, and a visitor from Martin's past shows up.
75	16	"Helga on the Couch" "Helga on the Couch, Parts I & II"	Christine Kolosov	Story by : Craig Bartlett & Steve Viksten; Written by : Craig Bartlett	Tim Parsons (director); Carson Kugler	December 4, 1999	078	N/A
A child psychiatrist, Dr. Bliss, shadows students at PS 118, quickly following Helga and noting her behavior, especially towards Arnold. After punching Brainy in the face, Helga is sent to Dr. Bliss's office for an appointment. Helga confides in Dr. Bliss about her social life, family life and her secret crush on Arnold. Guest star: Kathy Baker as Dr. Bliss
76	17	"Dino Checks Out" "Dino Checks Out Parts I & II"	Frank Weiss	Steve Viksten	Tuck Tucker (director); Miyuki Hoshikawa, Ted Seko & Diane Kredensor	December 11, 1999	079	N/A
Dino Spumoni is found missing and then declared dead after what appears to be a suicide attempt. but Arnold finds out that this is not the case, and he secretly lives in the boarding house, believing that his work will skyrocket in value after his "death". Guest star: Harvey Korman as Don Reynolds Note: The episode begins without the normal opening.
77	18	"Monkeyman!"	Frank Weiss	Craig Bartlett	Kurt Dumas (director); Caesar Martinez	March 4, 2000	075	N/A
77	18	"Buses, Bikes, and Subways"	Christine Kolosov	Craig Bartlett	Chris Robertson (director); Aldin Baroza & Miyuki Hoshikawa	March 4, 2000	075	N/A
"Monkeyman!": When Arnold gives the superhero Monkeyman a taste of normal life, he is far too busy to bother helping the weak and downtrodden. He realizes what he has become after Sid is mugged in front of a big party Monkeyman is attending. "Buses, Bikes, and Subways": Helga and Harold must return to town on their own after the bus leaves them behind after a school trip to a chocolate factory, and Helga has tickets for a wrestling match, and she cannot be late. Guest star: Andy Dick as Monkeyman Note: Despite premiering in 2000, this episode was copyrighted in 1999.
78	19	"Helga's Masquerade" "Helga as Lila"	Frank Weiss	Story by : Michelle Lamoreaux & Steve Viksten; Written by : Michelle Lamoreaux	Kurt Dumas (director); Caesar Martinez	March 11, 2000	077	N/A
78	19	"Mr. Green Runs" "Mr. Green Runs for Office"	Frank Weiss	Joseph Purdy	Kurt Dumas (director); Caesar Martinez	March 11, 2000	077	N/A
"Helga's Masquerade": Helga decides to act like Lila at Rhonda's costume party so Arnold will like her. "Mr. Green Runs": Mr. Green runs for city council after his requests for a large pothole in front of his store be filled up gets ignored. Arnold becomes his campaign manager, but can a butcher win against a politician?

=== Season 5 (2000–04) ===
No. overall	No. in season	Title	Directed by	Written by	Storyboarded by	Original release date	Prod. code	Viewers (millions)
79	1	"Sid the Vampire Slayer"	Christine Kolosov	Michelle Lamoreaux	Kurt Dumas (director); Ted Seko	March 18, 2000	081	N/A
79	1	"Big Sis"	Christine Kolosov	Story by : Michelle Lamoreaux & Dawn Hershey; Written by : Michelle Lamoreaux	Kurt Dumas (director); Ted Seko	March 18, 2000	081	N/A
"Sid the Vampire Slayer": Sid thinks Stinky is a vampire. "Big Sis": Olga gets into a "Big Sis" program, but her "Lil' Sis" is Lila.
80	2	"Bag of Money"	Christine Kolosov	Steve Viksten	Tim Parsons (director); Diane Kredensor	April 5, 2000	083	2.06 (HH)
80	2	"Principal Simmons"	Christine Kolosov	Story by : Joseph Purdy & Robert Lamoreaux; Written by : Joseph Purdy	Tim Parsons (director); Diane Kredensor	April 5, 2000	083	2.06 (HH)
"Bag of Money": Arnold, Sid and Gerald find a bag filled with money, though they do not know what to do with it, so Arnold is selected to hold onto it for the time being. However, when Arnold inadvertently loses the money on the way home, his friends begin to believe that he actually stole the money, so he must work to prove his innocence. "Principal Simmons": When Mr. Simmons is upset that Principal Wartz is being too tough on the students, Wartz decides to resign and he selects Mr. Simmons to take his place. The newly promoted Principal Simmons decides to make massive reforms to permit the school environment to be more liberal, though will the students at P.S. 118 appreciate his authority?
81	3	"New Bully on the Block"	Frank Weiss	Craig Bartlett	Carson Kugler (director); Caesar Martinez	April 12, 2000	084	N/A
81	3	"Phoebe Breaks a Leg"	Frank Weiss	Michelle Lamoreaux	Chris Robertson (director); Aldin Baroza	April 12, 2000	084	N/A
"New Bully on the Block": The kids must face two older bullies when a new kid, Ludwig, returns from some time in juvenile hall and challenges Wolfgang for the vacant lot. "Phoebe Breaks a Leg": When Phoebe breaks a leg after being hit by a bus, Helga believes it is her fault, so she starts being nice to Phoebe. When Phoebe's leg heals, she decides to stay disabled for a little longer. Note: Ludwig is voiced by Arnold's second voice actor, Phillip Van Dyke.
82	4	"Helga's Locket"	Frank Weiss	Joseph Purdy	Chris Robertson (director); Aldin Baroza & Miyuki Hoshikawa	April 19, 2000	086	N/A
82	4	"Sid and Germs"	Christine Kolosov	Antoinette Stella	Tim Parsons (director); Diane Kredensor	April 19, 2000	086	N/A
"Helga's Locket": Helga inscribes her name in her Arnold locket. Arnold's grandpa gets a hold of Helga's locket. He thinks it's a wedding anniversary gift from Grandma. So Helga must find a way to get it back before Arnold finds out her secret. "Sid and Germs": Sid becomes obsessed with cleanliness after watching a film on germs. His new obsession with being clean ruins the fourth graders' chances at the Frog Catching match against the 5th graders.
83	5	"Suspended"	Frank Weiss	Jonathan Greenberg	Chris Robertson (director); Aldin Baroza & Miyuki Hoshikawa	April 26, 2000	089	2.07 (HH)
83	5	"Ernie in Love"	Christine Kolosov	Steve Viksten	Tim Parsons (director); Diane Kredensor	April 26, 2000	089	2.07 (HH)
"Suspended": Harold gets suspended and will do anything to get back into school once he grows bored with being at home all day. "Ernie in Love": Ernie becomes attracted to a tall, kind, beautiful, plus-sized model named Lola. Arnold convinces him to build up courage to ask her out on a date to the pier, which she accepts. After the date, she tells him she had fun, but is unsure about another date because of his height. Guest star: Jennifer Tilly as Lola
84	6	"Parents Day" "Arnold's Parents"	Larry Leichliter & Tuck Tucker	Craig Bartlett & Antoinette Stella	Sherm Cohen & Tuck Tucker (directors); Tim Parsons, Chris Robertson, Caesar Martinez & Jay Lender	May 10, 2000	060	3.99 2.71 (HH)
It is time for the school's annual "Parents' Day", a weekend of competition with teams of a kid and their parents. Arnold feels odd about bringing his grandparents, as they are his parents, who he has not seen since he was a baby. After Big Bob calls Arnold an "orphan boy", Arnold asks Grandpa Phil what really happened with his parents, and he finds out that they disappeared after they left the country on a plane, delivering medicine, although they might still be alive. Arnold continues on with Parents' Day, with Phil and Gertie. He realizes even though they are not his parents, they raised him and made him who he is, which is what parents do. Note: This is the last episode with Phillip Van Dyke voicing Arnold.
85	7	"Summer Love" "Beach Story"	Christine Kolosov & Frank Weiss	Joseph Purdy & Michelle Lamoreaux	Chris Robertson & Kurt Dumas (directors); Aldin Baroza & Caesar Martinez	June 21, 2000	080	3.04 1.96 (HH)
When Arnold, the boarders and the Patakis go to the beach, a girl uses Arnold to win a sandcastle competition. Ernie gets buried in the sand. Miriam and Suzie start taking dance lessons from a handsome dance instructor named Carlos. Grandpa Phil thinks he is stuck on an island. Oskar starts using a metal detector to find "treasure". Big Bob gets a bad sunburn. Helga tries to warn Arnold that he is just being used. Guest star: Beverley Mitchell as Summer Note: This is the last episode of the fourth season in production order.
86	8	"Stuck in a Tree" "The Helga Short"	Christine Kolosov	Joseph Purdy & Steve Viksten	Tim Parsons (director); Miyuki Hoshikawa & Diane Kredensor	January 5, 2001	085	N/A
86	8	"Rhonda Goes Broke"	Frank Weiss	Robert Lamoreaux	Carson Kugler (director); Caesar Martinez	January 5, 2001	085	N/A
"Stuck in a Tree": Arnold gets stuck in a tree with Harold and Eugene. "Rhonda Goes Broke": Rhonda's family goes broke and they move into the boarding house.
87	9	"Beaned"	Frank Weiss	Michelle Lamoreaux	Carson Kugler (director); Caesar Martinez	January 12, 2001	087	N/A
87	9	"Old Iron Man" "Iron Man"	Frank Weiss	Jonathan Greenberg	Carson Kugler (director); Caesar Martinez	January 12, 2001	087	N/A
"Beaned": When Helga gets hit with a baseball during a game, she develops a case of amnesia, so Arnold stays with her all day because he feels responsible. The next day, Helga regains her memories, though, when she realizes what Arnold did for her, she decides to continue to play the part of an amnesiac in hopes of spending more time with him. "Old Iron Man": Grandpa Phil and his old friend, Jimmy Kafka, have been feuding for quite some time, as their friendship fell apart years ago. However, they still attempt to compete with one another as they each believe they are the better individual; though when both men decide to enter the extremely dangerous Old Iron Man triathlon, Arnold attempts to put an end to their feud, as he does not believe they should risk their lives over something so trivial. Guest Star: Richard Mulligan as Jimmy Kafka Note: This is Richard Mulligan's final performance in media, as he died 4 months before the episode's release.
88	10	"Arnold Visits Arnie"	Christine Kolosov	Michelle Lamoreaux	Aldin Baroza (director); Ted Seko	January 26, 2001	090	N/A
88	10	"Chocolate Boy"	Frank Weiss	Story by : Steve Viksten & Joseph Purdy; Written by : Joseph Purdy	Chris Robertson (director); Miyuki Hoshikawa & Sherm Cohen	January 26, 2001	090	N/A
"Arnold Visits Arnie": Arnold visits his cousin, Arnie, whose friends look remarkably familiar to Arnold's. Arnie's flirtatious girlfriend, Lulu (who looks like Lila), takes an interest in Arnold, while Arnold falls for a kind girl named Hilda (who looks like Helga), who likes Arnie. "Chocolate Boy": After winning a bet against Wolfgang, Chocolate Boy wants to give up chocolate after realizing he is willing to be humiliated to get chocolate. Arnold helps Chocolate Boy, realizing chocolate is his coping mechanism when his nanny left for a far, far away place (Delaware) and a bag of chocolate was her last gift to him.
89	11	"On the Lam"	Christine Kolosov	Jonathan Greenberg	Aldin Baroza (director); Ted Seko	December 8, 2001	093	N/A
89	11	"Family Man"	Frank Weiss	Steve Viksten	Chris Robertson (director); Miyuki Hoshikawa	June 1, 2002	093	3.74 3.10 (HH)
"On the Lam": Stinky, Harold and Sid decide to go on the run after their latest bit of mischief leads them to believe that they blew up a police station. "Family Man": The new owner of the restaurant where Mr. Hyunh works wants to make it a "family restaurant" and wants his new head chef to be a family man, so Mr. Hyunh pretends he has one — with Suzie as his wife, Arnold as his son and Grandpa as his father.
90	12	"Harold vs. Patty" "Harold and Patty Arm Wrestle"	Christine Kolosov	Story by : Robert Lamoreaux; Written by : Michelle Lamoreaux	Tim Parsons (director); Kelly James & Diane Kredensor	February 3, 2002	091	N/A
90	12	"Rich Guy" "Arnold and the Rich Guy"	Christine Kolosov	Joseph Purdy	Carson Kugler (director); Caesar Martinez	February 3, 2002	091	N/A
"Harold vs. Patty": After Harold loses to Patty at arm-wrestling, Sid and Stinky won't let him live down the fact he lost to a girl; so in order to regain his stride, Harold seeks Patty out twice: first for a rematch, then to help him retrain. "Rich Guy": When Arnold stops a hockey puck from hitting a rich man, the man treats Arnold as "the son he's always wanted". Arnold is fine with this until he discovers the man actually does have a son of his own and tries to help the two have a better relationship. Guest star: Fred Willard as Sammy Redmond
91	13	"April Fool's Day"	Raymie Muzquiz & Tuck Tucker; Christine Kolosov & Don Judge (animation)	Craig Bartlett, Michelle Lamoreaux & Joseph Purdy	Miyuki Hoshikawa & Tim Parsons	April 1, 2002	098	N/A
Arnold is sick and tired of being the target of everyone's April Fools jokes, and Helga has targeted Arnold as her practical joke victim for the day. When Helga goes one prank too far, Arnold stages a retaliation and brings in Grandpa's prized practical joke. The joke temporarily blinds Helga, who decides to get back at Arnold for daring to trifle with her by faking permanent blindness and essentially making him her slave.
92	14	"Gerald's Game"	Frank Weiss	Joseph Purdy	Carson Kugler (director); Caesar Martinez	April 27, 2002	082	4.07 2.74 (HH)
92	14	"Fishing Trip"	Frank Weiss	Joseph Purdy & Steve Viksten	Chris Robertson (director); Aldin Baroza & Miyuki Hoshikawa	April 27, 2002	082	4.07 2.74 (HH)
"Gerald's Game": Gerald is involved with his new favorite game, which Arnold dislikes. "Fishing Trip": Arnold, Gerald, Harold, Sid and Eugene go on a fishing trip with their fathers and Phil. Guest star: Davy Jones as himself Note: This episode first aired on Ketnet in Belgium.
93	15	"Married"	Frank Weiss	Steve Viksten	Aldin Baroza (director); Kelly James & Ted Seko	May 11, 2002	096	N/A
Rhonda uses a Cootie-Catcher fortune teller to predict who will marry who, and Arnold and Helga get paired up, causing them to both dream what life would be like married to each other, with very different mental pictures: Helga dreams of becoming the President with Arnold as the First Husband, as well as a bedraggled, long-suffering Lila appearing at almost every turn; and meanwhile, Arnold has a nightmare in which he is forced into a crummy job at Big Bob's Beepers, not to mention having to look after his and Helga's football-headed, one-browed babies while Helga loafs around the house and is still mean to him.
94	16	"The Racing Mule"	Christine Kolosov	Story by : Michelle Lamoreaux & Steve Viksten; Written by : Steve Viksten, Joseph Purdy, Craig Bartlett & Michelle Lamoreaux	Aldin Baroza (director); Ted Seko	January 14, 2004	092	N/A
94	16	"Curly's Girl" "Hurley's Girl"	Christine Kolosov	Story by : Michelle Lamoreaux, Steve Viksten & Joseph Purdy; Written by : Michelle Lamoreaux & Joseph Purdy	Tim Parsons (director); Kelly James	October 14, 2002	092	N/A
"The Racing Mule": Mr. Hyunh, Oskar, and Ernie buy a racehorse, which turns out to be a mule. "Curly's Girl": After Rhonda accidentally stains her mother's birthday present – a fur coat – that she wore to her school's art show without her parents' knowledge, Curly tells her that he can use his family's dry-cleaning business to get the stain out. The catch? Simple: Rhonda has to pretend to be Curly's girlfriend for an entire week.
95	17	"The Journal"	Raymie Muzquiz; Christine Kolosov (animation)	Craig Bartlett, Michelle Lamoreaux, & Joseph Purdy	Ron Brewer, Miyuki Hoshikawa, Tim Parsons, Stephen Sandoval, Dave Smith, & Ted Seko	November 11, 2002	099–100 (999)	N/A
96	18	"The Journal"	Raymie Muzquiz; Christine Kolosov (animation)	Craig Bartlett, Michelle Lamoreaux, & Joseph Purdy	Ron Brewer, Miyuki Hoshikawa, Tim Parsons, Stephen Sandoval, Dave Smith, & Ted Seko	November 11, 2002	099–100 (999)	N/A
Arnold finds his father's old journal, which tells the story of how his parents met, how they got Abner, his birth, why they went on their "last" trip...and one last surprise... Note: This episode was copyrighted in 2001. These were the final episodes produced; originally designed as a cliffhanger as a lead-in to "The Jungle Movie", a theatrical feature that was cancelled and then revived years later as a two-part television film. Note 2: This episode also exists as a full 47-minute special. Note 3: In production order, this is the series finale.
97	19	"Timberly Loves Arnold"	Frank Weiss	Craig Bartlett	Chris Robertson (director); Caesar Martinez	January 28, 2003	097	N/A
97	19	"Eugene, Eugene!"	Christine Kolosov	Craig Bartlett & Michelle Lamoreaux	Chris Robertson (director); Tim Parsons & Steve Lowtwait	January 28, 2003	097	N/A
"Timberly Loves Arnold": Gerald's little sister, Timberly develops a crush on Arnold after he sticks up for her and lets her hang out with them. Arnold is embarrassed at first, but when he finds out that Lila considers this admirable of him, Arnold is content to keep his mouth shut and let the charade continue. "Eugene, Eugene!": Eugene gets the lead role in the 4th grade production of "Eugene, Eugene", but the embittered director, Mr. Leichliter, removes all signs of hope from the script, having changed the ending himself to reflect real life (it is apparent he was influenced by his own past relationship with a woman). Meanwhile, Lila gets the role of the leading lady in the play and with Arnold playing the villain pursuing her, Helga attempts to sabotage her during the play. Note: This is the final episode where Spencer Klein and Sam Gifaldi voice Arnold and Sid before the first film officially began production. Alex D. Linz and Sam's younger brother, Taylor Gifaldi, voiced their respective characters from the last two episodes from the fifth season starting with "April Fool's Day" until "The Journal" which were the last two episodes made for the series.
98	20	"Ghost Bride"	Christine Kolosov	Steve Viksten	Tuck Tucker & Kurt Dumas (directors); Ted Seko	November 11, 2003	088	2.00 (2-11) (Note: (2-11) denotes the amount of children aged 2 through 11 who watched the episode when it premiered.)
98	20	"Gerald vs. Jamie O"	Christine Kolosov	Michelle Lamoreaux	Aldin Baroza (director); Ted Seko	November 11, 2003	088	2.00 (2-11)
"Ghost Bride": Gerald tells the story of the Ghost Bride, Cynthia Snell and how she brutally murdered her fiancé after he left her waiting at the altar and married her sister, who she also murdered. When the police came to the scene, she was still there, sitting in a rocking chair, in her wedding gown, tossing rice on the bodies as she hummed the Wedding March and before they could arrest her she jumps out of the second-story window and killed herself instantly. She also happens to be buried in the cemetery near the gang's neighborhood and supposedly comes back from the dead every anniversary of the murder. Arnold, Gerald, Eugene, Harold, Sid and Stinky are scared twice by Helga and Curly, each pretending to be the Ghost Bride (Helga because she wanted to get back at the boys for not letting her come with them because she was a girl and Curly because he was jealous he didn't get to tell the story). As punishment, the kids tie up Curly in the crypt, where at the end, he hears the real Cynthia Snell, although it's possible that he was only hallucinating. "Gerald vs. Jamie O": Gerald gets jealous because he thinks Jamie O. is trying to steal the girl he likes, when, actually, the girl likes Jamie O, and using Gerald to get close to him. Note: This episode first aired on Ketnet in Belgium.
99	21	"A Day in the Life of a Classroom" "Simmon's Documentary"	Frank Weiss	Joseph Purdy	Carson Kugler (director); Caesar Martinez	November 15, 2003	095	N/A
99	21	"Big Bob's Crisis"	Frank Weiss	Joseph Purdy & Michelle Lamoreaux	Chris Robertson (director); Caesar Martinez	November 15, 2003	095	N/A
"A Day in the Life of a Classroom": After Mr. Simmons wins an award, a TV station plans to do a documentary on a normal day in his class; at first, Mr. Simmons just wants to keep it normal, but when Arnold mentions that millions of people will be watching them on TV, Mr. Simmons makes his students rehearse a "perfect" day - scripted, of course. "Big Bob's Crisis": After a day of work where Big Bob is particularly mean and bad-tempered to some of his customers and employee, he suffers what he thinks is a heart attack while at a Texas-style restaurant (turns out it was just gas), but while he was unconscious he had an epiphany and decides to become nicer; when he goes overboard & announces the family will be walking to Oregon to join a commune, Helga takes it into her own hands to get her father back to his old self.
100	22	"Phoebe's Little Problem"	Christine Kolosov	Michelle Lamoreaux & Steve Viksten	Tim Parsons (director); Diane Kredesnor & Kelly James	June 8, 2004	094B	N/A
100	22	"Grandpa's Packard"	Frank Weiss	Craig Bartlett & Joseph Purdy	Carson Kugler (director); Caesar Martinez	June 8, 2004	094A	N/A
"Phoebe's Little Problem": After eating an entire box of Arnold's Grandma's homemade prune cookies on the bus to school, Phoebe accidentally "cuts the cheese" into a microphone while accepting an award; the incident leaves her feeling humiliated, and she resolves not to return to school. "Grandpa's Packard": Grandpa's beloved Packard is stolen while at an antique car show, so Arnold and Grandma have to go detective mode in order to track it down. Note: In airing order, this is the series finale.

== Theatrical film (2002) ==
Title	Directed by	Written by	Storyboarded by	Release date (U.S.)
"Hey Arnold!: The Movie"	Tuck Tucker	Craig Bartlett & Steve Viksten	Tim Parsons, Carson Kugler, Chris Robertson & Aldin Baroza (directors); Miyuki Hoshikawa, Diane Kredensor, Caesar Martinez & Ted Seko	June 28, 2002
Arnold, Gerald and Helga try to save their neighborhood from an evil businessman named Scheck who is trying to demolish their neighborhood to put up a shopping mall.

== Television film (2017) ==
Title	Directed by	Written by	Storyboarded by	Original air date (U.S.)
"Hey Arnold!: The Jungle Movie"	Raymie Muzquiz; Stu Livingston (co-director)	Craig Bartlett, Joe Purdy, Laura Sreebny & Justin Charlebois	Miyuki Hoshikawa, Kahee Lim, Steve Lowtwait, Rufino Roy Camacho II, Abby Davies & Jessie Wong	November 24, 2017
Arnold's class wins a field trip to San Lorenzo, the location of his missing parents. He uses this opportunity to get answers and try to find out what happened to them.
