= The Journal (Hey Arnold!) =

- Hey Arnold! episodes
- Episode nos.: Season 5 Episodes 17 and 18
- Directed by: Raymie Muzquiz
- Written by: Craig Bartlett; Michelle Lamoreaux; Joseph Purdy
- Production codes: 099; 100
- Original air date: November 11, 2002
- Running time: 47 minutes

Guest appearances
- Craig Bartlett as Miles; Antoinette Stella as Stella; Carlos Alazraqui as Eduardo

Episode chronology
← Previous "Curly's Girl"	Next → "Timberly Loves Arnold"

"The Journal" is a two-part episode of the American animated television series Hey Arnold! that aired as the seventeenth and eighteenth episodes of the show's fifth season. It originally aired on Nickelodeon in the United States on November 11, 2002. The episode, which ended on a cliffhanger, revisited a plotline from the episode "Parents Day". The cliffhanger remained unresolved up until the television film Hey Arnold!: The Jungle Movie premiered on November 24, 2017.

== Plot ==
Arnold finds his father's journal in the attic of the boarding house that describes the adventures of his parents in the jungle of San Lorenzo, their marriage, Arnold's birth, and other details of their life. On the final page, it contains a map showing where they had to go after they left him to deliver medicine to the people of the jungle.

== Production ==
"The Journal" originally premiered on November 11, 2002. It was originally designed as a prequel to lead-in to Hey Arnold!: The Jungle Movie, a theatrical Hey Arnold! feature-length film that was cancelled and years later revived as a two-part television movie.

Craig Bartlett described the decision to end the episode on a cliffhanger was meant to act as a dare directed at Paramount Pictures who were considering producing a follow-up to the episode that would also act as a sequel to Hey Arnold!: The Movie. However, after the theatrical film failed to meet box office expectations, the studio made the decision to cancel the film, leaving the questions posed by the episode unresolved for over a decade until The Jungle Movie was released in 2017.
