= Hey Arnold!: The Movie (video game) =

2002 video game

- North American box art
- Developer: Altron
- Publisher: THQ
- Producer: Masakazu Ishikawa
- Programmer: Mitsuhiro Niioka
- Composer: Tomoyoshi Sato
- Platform: Game Boy Advance
- Release: NA: May 29, 2002; EU: August 30, 2002
- Genres: Action-adventure, platform
- Mode: Single-player

Hey Arnold!: The Movie is a 2002 platform video game developed by Altron and published by THQ for the Game Boy Advance, based upon the TV show's film released the same year. It is the only video game to be exclusively based on Hey Arnold!.

== Gameplay ==
Arnold prepares to throw tomatoes at one of Scheck's henchmen.

Just like the film's plot, Arnold and Gerald must save their neighborhood from an industrialist named Scheck, who wishes to demolish the area and build a mall in its place. The game consists of five worlds, each one containing four levels and one boss enemy. The player may control Arnold, Gerald, Grandpa, and Grandma, which all are assigned their own levels with their own objectives. The player may use weapons such as teeth and toilet paper to defeat enemies. Helga, who can be unlocked with a secret code, replaces all the other characters. Using the same code will revert them.

== Reception ==
Marc Nix of IGN gave the game a 5.5 rating out of 10 and praised its graphics, but wrote: "Unfortunately, the actual game doesn't show nearly as much polish as the graphics engine. The layout of the stages has you making all kinds of blind jumps — the viewing angle won't adjust to show you where you're jumping, so often you'll be jumping over bottomless cliffs or even across tiny platforms without a clue where you're going". Nix also wrote that "the password on Hey Arnold! is exactly what's so wrong about using a password save. It's 9 digits with upper and lower case letters, plus funky punctuation and screwy symbols that a kid could write down wrong".

Jennifer Beam of AllGame rated the game three stars out of five and praised its graphics and "good background music". Beam called it "a well-delivered portable action game", but also wrote: "A fun and entertaining challenge the first time through, but probably will lose its appeal after the second".
