= Dom Irrera =

American actor and stand-up comedian (born 1948)

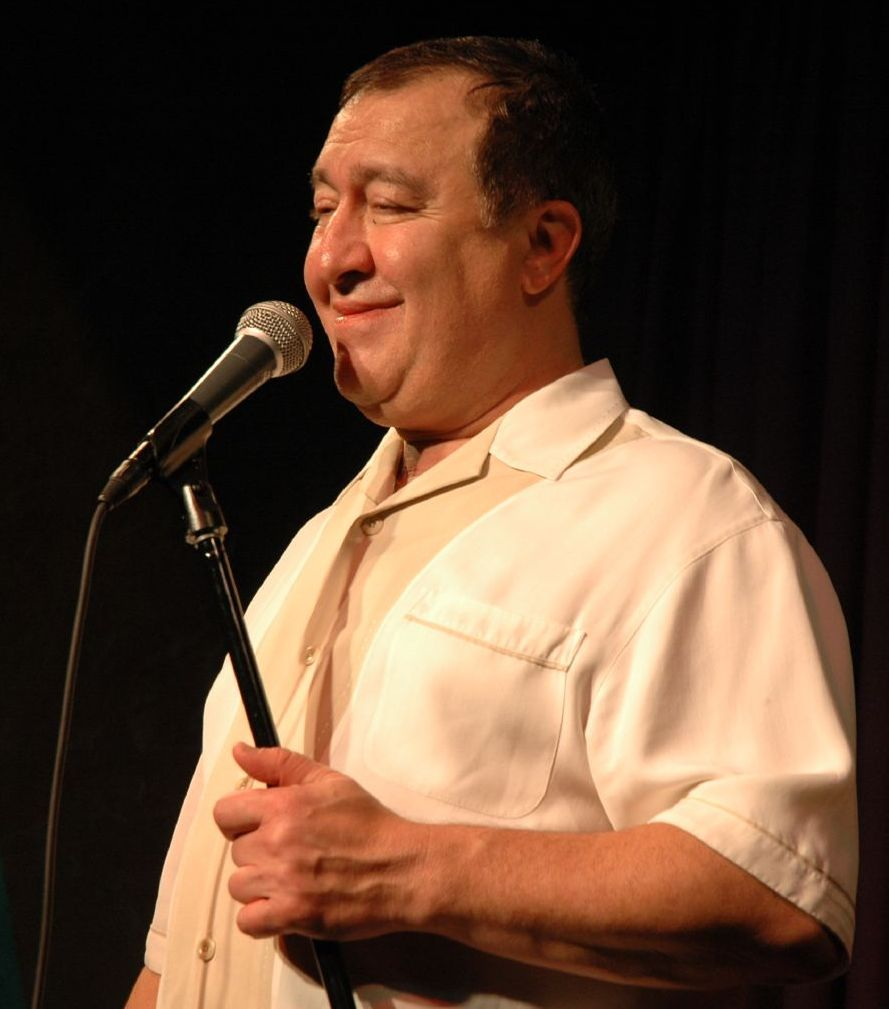
- Irrera performing in 2006
- Born: Domenick Jack Irrera; November 18, 1948 (age 77); Philadelphia, Pennsylvania, U.S.

Comedy career
- Years active: 1982–present
- Medium: Stand-up, television, film

Domenick Jack Irrera (born November 18, 1948) is an American actor and stand-up comedian. Much of his material is in the form of stories about his life, especially his childhood years and growing up in an Italian-American family.

== Biography ==
Irrera went to college in Florida, attending Barry University and St. Thomas University.

In 1989, Irrera's episode of the HBO TV series, One Night Stand won a Cable Ace Award.

Irrera has appeared on The Oprah Winfrey Show, The View, The Tonight Show Starring Johnny Carson in 1986, The Tonight Show with Jay Leno, The Late Late Show with Craig Ferguson, and The Late Show with David Letterman. He also appeared as a contestant on the game show Win Ben Stein's Money.

Irrera is a regular performer at the Cat Laughs in Kilkenny; he has made 22 appearances at the festival, more than any other comic. He appeared on an episode of the NBC sitcom Seinfeld as Ronnie Kaye, the prop comic and on the CBS sitcom The King of Queens as Spero Demopolous. Irrera made 11 appearances as himself on the animated series Dr. Katz, Professional Therapist, and is the only comic to appear in all six seasons (10 episodes).

Irrera was voted one of the hundred funniest comics of all time by Comedy Central. He was the Judge on the Supreme Court of Comedy on the 101 exclusively on DirecTV.

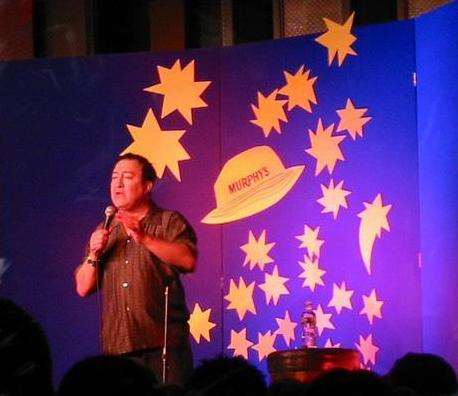
Dom Irrera at the Kilkenny Cat Laughs festival - Ireland in 2003

He also did some voiceovers for Nickelodeon as Ernie Potts on Hey Arnold! and as Duke on Back at the Barnyard, and played a chauffeur in the 1998 film The Big Lebowski.

== Discography ==
- Greatest Hits Volume One (2003)

== Filmography ==
=== Film ===
Year	Title	Role	Notes
1982	Splitz	Vinnie Mamabasta	
1987	Hollywood Shuffle	Writer	
1989	That's Adequate	Stand-Up Comic	
1994	The Silence of the Hams	Gas Station Attendant	
1998	The Big Lebowski	Tony the Chauffeur	
2000	A Man Is Mostly Water	Agent	
2002	Hey Arnold!: The Movie	Ernie Potts	Voice
2002	The 4th Tenor	Petey	
2006	Barnyard	Duke	Voice
2016	The Bronx Bull	Joe E. Lewis	
2017	Hey Arnold!: The Jungle Movie	Ernie Potts	Voice, television film

=== Television ===
Year	Title	Role	Notes
1985	Scarecrow and Mrs. King	Cab Driver	Episode: "The Wrong Way Home"
1986	The Golden Girls	The Produce Clerk / The Waiter	2 episodes
1987	My Sister Sam	Cab Driver	Episode: "Fog Bound"
1987–1988	It's Garry Shandling's Show	Dominic Carbone	2 episodes
1988	She's the Sheriff	Jim	2 episodes
1989	My Two Dads	The Elevator Repairman / Dr. Dom	2 episodes
1990	Room for Romance	Roman	4 episodes
1991	Dream On	Plumber	Episode: "The Charlotte Letter"
1992	Parker Lewis Can't Lose	Joey 'Pants'	Episode: "Home Alone with Annie"
1993	Rocko's Modern Life	Slippy	Voice, 2 episodes
1994	Seinfeld	Ronnie Kaye	Episode: "The Fire"
1994	Lois & Clark: The New Adventures of Superman	Harry	Episode: "Season's Greedings"
1996	Boy Meets World	Bosco	Episode: "Hair Today, Goon Tomorrow"
1996	Caroline in the City	Cop	Episode: "Caroline and the Dreamers"
1996–2002	Hey Arnold!	Ernie Potts	Voice, 34 episodes
1996–1997	Captain Simian & the Space Monkeys	Spydor	Voice, 4 episodes
1997–1998	Dr. Katz, Professional Therapist	Dominic	Voice, 7 episodes
1998	Damon	Carroll Fontaine	7 episodes
1998	Hercules	Achilles	Voice, episode: "Hercules and the Living Legend"
1998	Home Improvement	Ed	Episode: "Ploys for Tots"
2000	Everybody Loves Raymond	Seth Stipe	Episode: "Marie and Frank's New Friends"
2000	Becker	Mr. Orvis	Episode: "The Bearer of Bad Tidings"
2000	The King of Queens	Spero Demopolous	Episode: "Work Related"
2002	The Drew Carey Show	Stan	Episode: "Bringing Up Boss"
2002–2005	My Wife and Kids	Woody Flores	5 episodes
2003	Crank Yankers	Dominic 'Dom'	
2007–2011	Back at the Barnyard	Duke	Voice, 34 episodes
2010	'Til Death	Doctor	4 episodes
2014	Bob's Burgers	The Nose	Voice, episode: "Ambergris"
2017–2018	I'm Dying Up Here	James Seamus 'Fitzy' Fitzpatrick	9 episodes
2018	The Comedy Central Roast	Himself	Episode: "Bruce Willis"
