= Jim Lang (composer) =

- Born: James Volker Langknecht; November 22, 1950 (age 75); Kansas City, Missouri, U.S.
- Occupation: Composer
- Instruments: Piano; keyboards
- Years active: 1978–present

James Volker Langknecht (born November 22, 1950), known professionally as Jim Lang, is an American composer. He is known for scoring the Nickelodeon series Hey Arnold! (1996–2004), its feature film, Hey Arnold!: The Movie (2002), and the television film, Hey Arnold!: The Jungle Movie (2017), as well as working with series creator Craig Bartlett on his other shows such as Dinosaur Train and Ready Jet Go!.

In 2001, Lang was nominated for an Annie Award for Outstanding Individual Achievement for a Song in an Animated Production for the main title song of Lloyd in Space. In 2004, he received an ASCAP Award for Top TV Series for Hey Arnold!

== Filmography ==
- Love or Money (1990)
- The Letters from Moab (1991)
- Body Bags (1993; with John Carpenter)
- In the Mouth of Madness (1994; with John Carpenter)
- Hey Arnold! (1996–2004)
- Lloyd in Space (2001–2004)
- Hey Arnold!: The Movie (2002)
- Unstable Fables (2008)
- Fred and Vinnie (2011)
- Dinosaur Train (2009–2017)
- Ready Jet Go! (2016–2019)
- Hey Arnold!: The Jungle Movie (2017)
- Ready Jet Go!: Space Camp (2023)
- Primos (2024–2025)
- Weather Hunters (2025–present)
