= Baoan Coleman =

Vietnamese-born American actor (1939–2025)

- Born: May 30, 1939; Saigon, French Indochina present day Vietnam
- Died: February 25, 2025 (aged 85); Glendale, California, U.S.
- Occupation: Actor
- Years active: 1984–2002

An Nguyen Coleman (May 30, 1939 – February 25, 2025), better known as Baoan Coleman, was a Vietnamese-born American actor who had a supporting role in Rambo: First Blood Part II. He also had smaller roles in other films including Rules of Engagement and was the voice of Mr. Hyunh in Nickelodeon's Hey Arnold! animated series. He was of Vietnamese heritage.

Coleman died in Glendale, California on February 25, 2025, at the age of 85.

== Filmography ==
Filmography
Year	Title	Role	Notes
1984	Matt Houston	Soldier	2 episodes
1985	Rambo: First Blood Part II	Gunboat Captain	
1987	The Hanoi Hilton	Rabbit	
1987	Tour of Duty	Victor Charles Leader	episode: Brothers, Fathers, and Sons
1990	Hunter	Mr. Tai	episode: Kill Zone
1996	High School High	Mou Mou Bartender	
1996–2002	Hey Arnold!	Mr. Hyunh	Voice, 28 episodes
2000	Rules of Engagement	Col. Binh Le Cao	
2002	Hey Arnold!: The Movie	Mr. Hyunh	Voice (final role)
