= Hey Arnold!: The Movie =

2002 animated film by Tuck Tucker

- Theatrical release poster
- Directed by: Tuck Tucker
- Written by: Craig Bartlett; Steve Viksten
- Based on: Hey Arnold! by Craig Bartlett
- Produced by: Snee-Oosh, Inc.: Craig Bartlett; Nickelodeon: Albie Hecht
- Starring: Spencer Klein; Francesca Marie Smith; Jamil Walker Smith; Dan Castellaneta; Tress MacNeille; Paul Sorvino; Jennifer Jason Leigh
- Edited by: Christopher Hink
- Music by: Jim Lang
- Production companies: Nickelodeon Movies; Snee-Oosh, Inc.; Nickelodeon Animation Studios
- Distributed by: Paramount Pictures
- Release date: June 28, 2002
- Running time: 76 minutes
- Country: United States
- Language: English
- Budget: $3–4 million
- Box office: $15.2 million

Hey Arnold!: The Movie is a 2002 American animated adventure comedy film based on the television series created by Craig Bartlett. It was directed by Tuck Tucker and written by Bartlett and Steve Viksten, with music by series composer Jim Lang. The film stars Spencer Klein, Francesca Smith, Jamil Walker Smith, Dan Castellaneta, Tress MacNeille, Paul Sorvino, and Jennifer Jason Leigh. The film follows Arnold, Gerald, and Helga on a quest to save their neighborhood from a greedy developer who plans on converting it into a huge shopping mall. The events of the film take place during the series' fifth and final season.

The project was originally developed as a television film titled Arnold Saves the Neighborhood, but following successful test screenings, Paramount Pictures decided to give the film a theatrical release. Hey Arnold!: The Movie was released in theaters on June 28, 2002, and received unfavorable reviews from critics. The film grossed $15 million against a production budget of $3–$4 million. A made for television sequel, Hey Arnold!: The Jungle Movie, aired in 2017.

== Plot ==
Arriving home from being defeated by fifth graders in a basketball game, Arnold Shortman and his best friend Gerald Johanssen learn from butcher Marty Green that Alphonse Perrier du von Scheck, the CEO of real estate company FutureTech Industries (FTI), has announced plans to redevelop the entire neighborhood of Hillwood as a luxurious high-rise shopping mall. That night, Helga Pataki finds that her father, Big Bob, is working with FTI to build a new super-sized branch of his beeper store in the proposed mall.

Arnold hosts a block party called "Blockapalooza" as a demonstration against FTI, but it fails when Scheck's employees steal their permit, and Arnold's grandmother Gertie is arrested for being hostile to the police suppressing the rally, causing the neighbors to lose hope and sell their homes to FTI. The neighborhood's fate appears to be sealed until Arnold learns from his grandfather Phil about the "Tomato Incident", a major post-Pig War battle fought in the city which occurred at the site of the Sunset Arms boarding house. Arnold realizes that the neighborhood had to have been declared a historic district after the war, effectively ensuring its preservation. Arnold and Gerald search throughout the city for the legal document certifying its landmark status, and discover that the document was sold to Scheck, who denies obtaining it.

As the deadline draws near, Arnold gets a phone call from "Deep Voice", (Note: A reference to "Deep Throat".) someone who reveals that Scheck has the document inside his office safe and is lying about not knowing its whereabouts. Arnold and Gerald steal the key to the safe from Big Bob's friend and Scheck's assistant, Nick Vermicelli, who later realizes this, and informs Scheck. Meanwhile, Phil and the other residents of Sunset Arms devise a backup plan to stop the bulldozers from destroying the neighborhood, wiring the storm drain tunnels beneath their street with dynamite to intercept FTI's construction equipment. Big Bob later joins them after attacking Vermicelli in his apartment when discovering Vermicelli's contract states Scheck will control 51% of his company and consequently swindle him.

Aided by agent Bridget, Arnold and Gerald infiltrate the FTI headquarters, only for them to discover that Scheck has the document in his hand. Scheck then shares his own family's history regarding the Tomato Incident; his ancestor Archibald, the governor of the local British forces, was defeated and humiliated by the American colonists, including Arnold's ancestors, who protested the increased taxes on tomatoes. To avenge his family's honor, Scheck intends to demolish the neighborhood and replace it with a building carrying his name on it, destroying the document to ensure that his plans will proceed, before summoning his guards to get rid of the duo. They escape, but believe they have failed, until "Deep Voice" advises Arnold to obtain the FTI's security-camera footage of Scheck burning the document.

Arnold discovers that "Deep Voice" is Helga, who admits that she became involved because of her love for him. The pair escape the building and meet Gerald on a city bus, convincing the driver Murray to accelerate at maximum speed when he learns that his former girlfriend Mona lives in the same neighborhood. Mayor Dixie, who had previously approved plans for the mall, arrives at the scene, along with the police and a news crew. Accessing a jumbotron installed by FTI, Arnold and Bridget debut the footage of Scheck burning the document to everybody present. Dixie officially restores the neighborhood's status as a historic site, never to be destroyed by anyone for any purpose.

Scheck arrives and realizes that he has been caught and will likely be facing prison time. Having escaped prison, Gertie sabotages his car, and Scheck is promptly arrested. Bob then spots Vermicelli trying to escape and punches him for trying to swindle him. Arnold's neighbor Harold Berman sits on the detonator, inadvertently igniting Phil's explosives and causing the jumbotron monitor to be destroyed. Helga denies loving Arnold, claiming she confessed to him in "the heat of the moment." Arnold, although unconvinced, pretends to accept it.

== Voice cast ==
- Spencer Klein as Arnold Shortman
- Francesca Marie Smith as Helga Pataki and Deep Voice
- Jamil Walker Smith as Gerald Johanssen and Rasta Guy
- Dan Castellaneta as Grandpa Phil Shortman and Nick Vermicelli
- Tress MacNeille as Grandma Gertie Shortman, Mayor Dixie, and Red
- Paul Sorvino as Alphonse Perrier du von Scheck
- Jennifer Jason Leigh as Bridget
- Christopher Lloyd as Coroner
- Maurice LaMarche as Big Bob Pataki and Head of Security
- Sam Gifaldi as Sid
- Christopher P. Walberg as Stinky Peterson
- Olivia Hack as Rhonda Lloyd
- Blake McIver Ewing as Eugene Horowitz
- Anndi McAfee as Phoebe Heyerdahl
- Justin Shenkarow as Harold Berman
- Vincent Schiavelli as Mr. Bailey
- Kath Soucie as Miriam Pataki, Mona, and Reporter
- James Keane as Marty Green and Riot Cop
- Elizabeth Ashley as Mrs. Vitello
- Michael Levin as Ray Doppel
- Steve Viksten as Oskar Kokoshka
- Dom Irrera as Ernie Potts
- Baoan Coleman as Mr. Hyunh
- Craig Bartlett as Brainy, Murray, Grubby, and Monkeyman

== Production ==
In 1998, Nickelodeon renewed Hey Arnold! for a fourth season, and gave creator Craig Bartlett the chance to develop two feature-length adaptations. As work on the fifth season was completing, in 2001, Bartlett and company engaged in the production of the first film, titled Arnold Saves the Neighborhood. The Neighborhood project was originally produced for television and home video as the last 3 episodes of season 5, but eventually became Hey Arnold!: The Movie when executives at Paramount Pictures decided to release it theatrically after successful test screenings. According to animation historian Jerry Beck (in his Animated Movie Guide), the decision was also buoyed by the financial success of the first two Rugrats films, The Rugrats Movie and Rugrats in Paris: The Movie.

== Release ==
The first trailer was released theatrically in December 2001 with Jimmy Neutron: Boy Genius. A second trailer consisting of new animation debuted during the 2002 Kids' Choice Awards. They showed segments on Nickelodeon called "Backyard Players" where kids would play Arnold, Gerald, and Helga and act out scenes from the film. There was a contest held for a lucky winner to be Arnold for a day and go to the film's premiere. The song "2-Way" by Lil' Romeo was used to help promote the film, and plays during the film's ending credits.

Hey Arnold!: The Movie was Nickelodeon's first animated feature to receive a PG rating from the Motion Picture Association of America (MPAA) for thematic elements.

=== Box office ===
Opening on June 28, 2002, in the United States, the film grossed over $15 million worldwide on a budget of $3–4 million. The film grossed $5.7 million, averaging $2,258 from 2,527 theaters, and ranking #6 for the weekend. It dropped 65% in its second weekend, grossing $2 million, falling to #14, averaging $793 from 2,534 theaters, and bringing the 10-day total to $10.7 million. In its third weekend, it dropped another 70%, grossing $610,028, falling to #20, averaging $302 from 2,021 theaters, and bringing the 17-day total to $12.6 million. The film closed on August 22, 2002, grossing a total of $13.7 million in the US and $1.5 million internationally.

=== Home media ===
Hey Arnold!: The Movie was released on VHS and DVD on December 31, 2002, by Paramount Home Entertainment. The film was released as an upscaled manufacture-on-demand Blu-ray on February 15, 2022.

== Reception ==
On the review aggregator website Rotten Tomatoes, 29% of 76 critics' reviews are positive. The website's consensus reads: "Bland, unoriginal, and lacking the wit of the TV series, Hey Arnold is a 30 min cartoon stretched beyond its running time." Metacritic, which uses a weighted average, assigned the film a score of 47 out of 100, based on 23 critics, indicating "mixed or average" reviews. Audiences polled by CinemaScore gave the film an average grade of "B+" on an A+ to F scale.

== Video game ==
THQ released a video game based on the film, exclusively for the Game Boy Advance. The game consists of five worlds, with four levels each (each including a boss on the fourth level) and the player can play as Arnold, Gerald, Grandpa, Grandma, and Helga, the latter of which is only unlockable through the use of a cheat code.

== Sequel ==
A second film, titled Hey Arnold!: The Jungle Movie, was in production but due to the disappointing results of the first film, the project was cancelled. Bartlett later left Nickelodeon, resulting in Hey Arnold!'s cancellation, with the last episode airing on Nickelodeon on June 8, 2004, unannounced. In 2015, it was announced that The Jungle Movie had resumed production as a TV film. The film was first broadcast on Nickelodeon and sister networks TeenNick and Nicktoons in the United States on November 24, 2017. The film was later broadcast on Nickelodeon channels and select theatres worldwide in 2018. The debut airing was simulcast on Nickelodeon, TeenNick, and Nicktoons.
