= Steve Viksten =

American voice actor

- Born: Stephen Lee Viksten; July 19, 1960; Ventura, California, U.S.
- Died: June 23, 2014 (aged 53); Roseville, California, U.S.
- Occupations: Voice actor, writer
- Years active: 1985–2011

Stephen Lee Viksten (July 19, 1960 – June 23, 2014) was an American television writer and voice actor who was best known for co-developing, and voicing the character Oskar Kokoshka on, the Nickelodeon animated series Hey Arnold!. Viksten also wrote multiple episodes of Hey Arnold!, Rugrats, Recess, Duckman and The Simpsons. Viksten's sole contribution to the latter, season 22's "Homer Scissorhands", was his final writing credit before his death.

== Early life ==
Viksten was born in Ventura, California on July 19, 1960. His father was the vice president of the local Sears. During his teenage years, Viksten's family moved to Arcadia, California, where Viksten became editor of Arcadia High School's newspaper. After graduating from Arcadia High School in 1978, Viksten attended several universities including the University of Missouri, UCLA, and Cal State Fullerton, though he did not obtain a bachelor's degree.

== Death ==
Viksten died on June 23, 2014, at age 53. The TV film Hey Arnold!: The Jungle Movie, released three years later, was dedicated to his memory.
