= Lane Toran =

American actor and musician (born 1982)

- Born: Lane Toran Caudell; October 15, 1982 (age 44); Los Angeles, California, U.S.
- Occupations: Actor; musician
- Years active: 1995–present

Lane Toran Caudell (born October 15, 1982) is an American actor and musician. He is known for his voice roles on Disney's Recess and Nickelodeon's Hey Arnold!

== Career ==
Toran played Rod on 7th Heaven, an American television series about a Protestant minister's family living in the fictional town of Glenoak, California, appearing in 9 episodes from 1997 to 2001.

In animation, he was the first actor to provide the voice of the title role of Arnold Shortman (season 1) and later in the series, the voice of Wolfgang, the leader of the sadistic and heartless 5th grade bullies, on the Nickelodeon animated show Hey Arnold! He provided the voice of King Bob on Disney's Recess.'

In the 1995 film Max Is Missing, Toran plays the part of a 12-year-old boy who accompanies his family on vacation to Peru. The boy is separated from his father while visiting the ancient Incan ruins of Machu Picchu. Thieves chase him after he is given a priceless mask by a dying man.

Over a year later, Toran starred in the light-hearted fantasy Johnny Mysto: Boy Wizard. In this film, aimed at a pre-teen audience, he plays the part of a budding young magician who stumbles across an unusual ring. He embarks on a medieval, time-travel quest to find his enchanted sister and ends up in Camelot before King Arthur. It turns out the ring belongs to none other than Merlin.

Toran performed the lead vocals for several TV series and has appeared on stage in Oliver!, Peter Pan and Li'l Abner. He has played Conrad Birdie in Bye Bye Birdie, the Lion in the Wiz and the Prince in Cinderella in theatre.

Together with Haylie Duff he co-wrote the song "Sweet Sixteen" on Hilary Duff's second studio album Metamorphosis.

Toran announced in 2016 on his Instagram profile that he would return to Hey Arnold! to voice characters for the 2017 television movie Hey Arnold!: The Jungle Movie.

He performs lead vocals on his own original songs and with the band DieRadioDie in Los Angeles.

== Personal life ==
Toran is the son of musician and singer Lane Caudell.

== Filmography ==
Filmography
Year	Title	Role	Notes
2020	Getaway	Merv	Director/Writer
2020	Tell Me a Story	Steve	Episode: "Thorns and All"
2017	Hey Arnold!: The Jungle Movie	Che, Crewman, Pirate 1, Guard 1	TV movie
2015	RePlay	Twain	2 episodes
2015	Satisfaction	Scotty	2 episodes
2015	Nashville	Bobby	Episode: "How Can I Help You Say Goodbye"
2004	L.A. D.J.	Skinny Skater	
2004	The Eavesdropper	Cameron	
2003	As Told by Ginger	Fred	2 episodes
2003	All Grown Up!	Various	
2003	Malcolm in the Middle	Jason	Episode: "If Boys Were Girls"
2002	Rocket Power	Cool Kid	Episode: "Home Sweet Home/What a Tangled Web We Ski"
2001	The Rugrats: All Growed Up	TJ	TV movie
2001	Recess: School's Out	King Bob	
2000	The Weekenders	Unnamed character	Episode: "Shoes of Destiny"
1999	M.U.G.E.N	Unnamed character	Video game
1998	Billboard Dad	Surfer	
1997	Johnny Mysto: Boy Wizard	Johnny Mysto	
1997–2001	7th Heaven	Rod	9 episodes
1997–2001	Recess	King Bob	40 episodes
1997	101 Dalmatians: The Series	Tripod	10 episodes
1997	The Killing Jar	Young Michael Sanford	
1997	Aaahh!!! Real Monsters	Newsboy/Kid	Episode: "The Great Escape/Beast with Four Eyes"
1996–2001	Hey Arnold!	Arnold Shortman (1996-1997), Wolfgang, Additional Characters	Main cast; 40 episodes
1996	Moloney	Joe Ballantine Jr.	Episode: "Pilot"
1995	Roseanne	Joseph	Episode: "The Last Thursday in November"
1995	Max Is Missing	Max	TV movie
