= Hey Arnold!: The Jungle Movie =

2017 American animated television film

- Promotional release poster
- Genre: Adventure; Comedy
- Based on: Hey Arnold! by Craig Bartlett
- Written by: Snee-Oosh, Inc.: Craig Bartlett; Joe Purdy; Nickelodeon: Laura Sreebny; Justin Charlebois
- Directed by: Raymie Muzquiz
- Starring: Mason Vale Cotton; Francesca Marie Smith; Benjamin Flores Jr.; Anndi McAfee; Dan Castellaneta; Tress MacNeille; Alfred Molina
- Music by: Jim Lang
- Country of origin: United States
- Original language: English

Production
- Executive producer: Craig Bartlett
- Producer: Lizbeth Velasco
- Editor: Christopher Hink
- Running time: 81 minutes
- Production companies: Snee-Oosh, Inc. (uncredited); Nickelodeon Animation Studio

Original release
- Network: Nickelodeon
- Release: November 24, 2017

Hey Arnold!: The Jungle Movie is a 2017 American animated coming of age adventure comedy television film based on the Nickelodeon series Hey Arnold!. Following the 2002 theatrical film Hey Arnold!: The Movie, The Jungle Movie expands on the two-part episode "The Journal", which aired later that same year during the show's fifth and final season.

The film serves as the definitive series finale. It answered questions left after the original run ended, including the whereabouts of Arnold's missing parents. It originally aired in the United States on November 24, 2017, on Nickelodeon, while also being simulcast on Nicktoons and TeenNick. In 2018, it won an Emmy for Outstanding Individual Achievement in Animation.

== Plot ==
During the summer after their 5th grade year, Arnold and Gerald plan to make a humanitarian video to win a trip to San Lorenzo, a Central American country where Arnold's parents were last seen. They try to record themselves making a house out of junk for one of their friends, Monkeyman. However, as they are filming, the local homeless claim the junk as their property and destroy the home.

Helga, who secretly has a longtime crush on Arnold, uses video footage she has compiled over the years, showing Arnold's good deeds. Everyone in town surprises Arnold with the video, which wins the competition. Arnold, his classmates of P.S. 118, and Helga's older sister, Olga, fly to San Lorenzo. While on the plane, Arnold's pet pig Abner stows away in his backpack. Everyone arrives in San Lorenzo and is greeted by Arnold's parents' old friend, Eduardo. Aboard a ship, Eduardo gives Arnold an amulet said to lead them to the "Green-Eyed People", the residents of San Lorenzo's lost city.

Later that night, Helga tries to confess her feelings to Arnold, but the boat is attacked by pirates. When the group reaches a base camp, "Eduardo" reveals himself to be a mercenary named Lasombra. He and his men imprison everyone, explaining that the contest was a trick to lure Arnold to San Lorenzo so he could use him to find the lost city and its treasures. Additionally, Lasombra claims the deal he and Arnold made and the fact Arnold did not tell them about this, causing Arnold's peers including Gerald and Helga to shun him. Upon hearing Arnold cry for his parents and realizing he had nothing to do with Lasombra's plot, Helga and Gerald escape and free Arnold. They use Arnold's father's old journal to find the city; unbeknownst to them, Lasombra anticipated this and placed a tracking device on Arnold's green-eyed necklace. Arnold and his friends evade the lost city's traps, while Lasombra pursues them, sacrificing most of his accompanying men to the traps.

Meanwhile, Abner escapes and returns to Arnold's grandparents, Grandpa Phil and Grandma Gertie, who see this as a sign that Arnold is in trouble. They meet with Helga's parents Big Bob and Miriam at the airport, as the latter two received an SOS message from Helga's best friend Phoebe, and fly a rental plane to San Lorenzo and help the other kids defeat Lasombra's gang.

Arnold, Gerald and Helga reach the city, finding it populated by children due to a "sleeping sickness" that has left its adult population comatose for nine years. The group finds a statue said to contain the Corazón, a treasure that may lead to a cure. Lasombra corners them, taking Arnold hostage and stealing the statue. He then forces Arnold to open the statue using the amulet, but the statue's defense system shoots him in the forehead with a poisoned dart, sending Lasombra over a cliff.

The real Eduardo arrives, explaining that the pirate "attacking" them earlier was him trying to rescue the group from Lasombra. Lasombra climbs back up from the cliff and battles Eduardo, knocking the Corazón off the cliff, before succumbing to the poison and plummeting to his death. The group returns to the city, and Arnold finally sees his parents, Miles and Stella, who have also contracted the sickness. Without the Corazón to release the cure to the infected population, Helga uses her locket containing a photo of Arnold as replacement. The temple releases the cure and the infected are revived. Arnold and the city's children reunite with their parents. Arnold thanks Helga for her loyalty and finally realizes her feelings for him before the two share a kiss.

Months later, life as normal has resumed at Arnold's grandparents' boarding house, though now with Miles and Stella living there as well. Arnold says goodbye to his parents as he heads off for his first day of 6th grade with Gerald, Phoebe, and Helga. Gerald and Phoebe walk off together. Arnold and Helga are also implied to be a couple, despite Helga pretending to remain hostile towards Arnold once in public to keep up her image.

== Cast ==
Characters: Arnold, Helga, Gerald, Phoebe

The voice cast for the film is made up of 20 actors from the original series (depicted with * below with the original character), and 11 new cast members to replace former actors who retired, grew up, or died.

- Mason Vale Cotton as Arnold Shortman
- Benjamin Flores Jr. as Gerald Johanssen
- Francesca Marie Smith* as Helga Pataki
- Dan Castellaneta* as Grandpa Phil Shortman
- Tress MacNeille* as Grandma Gertie Shortman, Homeless Woman
- Anndi McAfee* as Phoebe Heyerdahl, Reporter
- Justin Shenkarow* as Harold Berman
- Olivia Hack* as Rhonda Wellington Lloyd
- Gavin Lewis as Eugene Horowitz
- Aiden Lewandowski as Sid
- Jet Jurgensmeyer as Stinky Peterson
- Laya Hayes as Nadine
- Nicolas Cantu as Thaddeus "Curly" Gammelthorpe
- Dan Butler* as Mr. Robert Simmons
- Maurice LaMarche* as Big Bob Pataki, Homeless Man 1, Flunky Guard
- Kath Soucie* as Miriam Pataki
- Nika Futterman* as Olga Pataki
- Craig Bartlett* as Miles Shortman, Brainy, Abner, Monkeyman
- Antoinette Stella* as Stella Shortman
- Carlos Alazraqui* as Eduardo
- Dom Irrera* as Ernie Potts
- Wally Wingert as Oskar Kokoshka, Mr. Hyunh, Homeless Man 2
- Rick Corso* as Dino Spumoni
- Danny Cooksey* as Stoop Kid
- Danielle Judovits* as Big Patty Smith
- Jim Belushi* as Coach Jack Wittenberg
- Stephen Stanton as Pigeon Man
- Lane Toran* as Crewman, Pirate 1, Guard 1, Che
- Jamil Walker Smith* as Paulo, Guard 2, Pirate 2
- Alfred Molina as Lasombra
- Hope Levy as Girl Queen

== Production ==
=== Development ===
In 1998, when Nickelodeon renewed Hey Arnold! for a fourth season, they offered series creator Craig Bartlett a chance to develop two feature-length films based on the series: one as a TV movie or direct-to-video, called Arnold Saves the Neighborhood, and another slated for a theatrical release. Nickelodeon asked Bartlett to do "the biggest idea he could think of" for the theatrical film. After looking at the series, Bartlett decided to make the theatrical feature as a spiritual sequel/follow-up to the episode "Parents Day" and have Arnold try to solve the question of what happened to Miles and Stella, his parents. This became known as Hey Arnold!: The Jungle Movie. In 2001, executives at Nickelodeon and Paramount Pictures decided to give the made-for-TV movie Arnold Saves the Neighborhood a theatrical release instead in 2002, under the title of Hey Arnold!: The Movie to attract the attention of the public, after successful test screenings. Around this time, Nickelodeon also asked Bartlett to produce a special one-hour "prequel" episode called "The Journal" that would serve as a lead-in to the second film. The episode aired on Nickelodeon on November 11, 2002.

However, Hey Arnold!: The Movie was a critical and commercial failure, resulting in the cancellation of The Jungle Movie and leaving Hey Arnold! with an unresolved cliffhanger ending.

During subsequent years, Bartlett shared many details, characters and plot points of the film; however, he did not reveal any significant spoilers in the event that the film might someday get made. Around 2009, many fans started online petitions to convince Nickelodeon to greenlight The Jungle Movie. In 2011, reruns of Hey Arnold! on TeenNick's late-night classic Nickelodeon programming block The '90s Are All That increased public attention in the series and its cancelled film. In October 2012, Bartlett revealed that he was back at Nickelodeon having meetings with them. In December 2014, it was revealed that Bartlett and Nickelodeon's executives were interested in reviving Hey Arnold!.

In September 2015, Nickelodeon announced officially during an interview with Entertainment Weekly that they were considering reviving many of their old properties, and that Hey Arnold! was one of them. On November 23, 2015, Nickelodeon reported that they were working on a Hey Arnold! TV film that would answer all the fans' questions, including the whereabouts of Arnold's parents, with Bartlett set to write and produce. On March 1, 2016, it was announced that the film would be released in 2017. The next day, Bartlett confirmed officially that the TV film would be The Jungle Movie and that it would be released as a two-hour TV film.

=== Writing ===
According to Bartlett, the story of The Jungle Movie was originally written and produced between 1998 and 2001 by Steve Viksten, Jonathan Greenberg and himself. Storyboards were drafted by Raymie Muzquiz and test footage was produced.

In the years following the film's cancellation, Bartlett confirmed many plot points of the film, such as the revelation of Arnold's name during the opening sequence and that Arnold still had the map of the jungle of San Lorenzo that he found in "The Journal". He also revealed that Lasombra was searching for La Corazón, a fabulous jewel and sacred relic of the Green-Eyed people, the tribe that Miles and Stella helped in the past. Helga's and Arnold's relationship would also take a next step, after Helga kissed Arnold in the climax of the Hey Arnold!: The Movie. Bartlett mentioned in an interview that The Jungle Movie was the first thing he pitched when he came back to Nickelodeon.

In June 2016, Bartlett confirmed that the TV film was written to take place with the kids going into the sixth grade, one year after the ending of the original series. In July 2016, Variety showed various artworks of the main characters.

As revealed in a promo during the NickSplat premiere, the script for the film was originally twice as long. One particular gag that was cut was the parade sequence in San Lorenzo, in which Olga appears on a parade float, and Helga appears on another dressed as a monkey. In the final version, there is only a very brief shot of the parade.

=== Casting ===
On June 13, 2016, it was reported that Francesca Marie Smith, Anndi McAfee, Justin Shenkarow, Olivia Hack, Nika Futterman, Dan Butler, Dan Castellaneta, Tress MacNeille, Antoinette Stella, Carlos Alazraqui, Dom Irrera, Maurice LaMarche, Kath Soucie, Danielle Judovits, Danny Cooksey, Jim Belushi, and Hey Arnold! creator Craig Bartlett himself were attached to reprise their respective roles as Helga, Phoebe, Harold, Rhonda, Olga, Mr. Simmons, Grandpa, Grandma, Stella, Eduardo, Ernie, Bob Pataki, Miriam, Big Patty, Stoop Kid, Coach Wittenberg and Miles; while Lane Toran and Jamil Walker Smith, the original voices of Arnold and Gerald, were attached to return, but as the voices of San Lorenzo tour guides, while being replaced by Mason Vale Cotton and Benjamin Flores Jr. respectively; and Alfred Molina was cast as Lasombra, the film's main antagonist. The next day, it was reported that Gavin Lewis, Jet Jurgensmeyer, Aiden Lewandowski, and Laya Hayes were respectively cast as Eugene, Stinky, Sid and Nadine.

=== Music ===
Jim Lang, who previous composed the music for the original series, returned to compose music for the film.

== Release ==
=== Marketing ===
On July 10, 2017, Nickelodeon released an "exclusive first look" at the new character designs narrated by Bartlett. Eleven days later, on July 21, to coincide with the Hey Arnold! panel at San Diego Comic-Con, a short scene from the film was released, in which Arnold is presented with a special film about all the good deeds he has done for his neighborhood. The film's official trailer was released on October 6, 2017. An additional trailer was released on the NickSplat YouTube channel on November 7, 2017.

During the month of November, NickSplat (a programming block on TeenNick that regularly features the series) aired Hey Arnold! episodes every night from 12:00 to 1:00 AM (ET/PT). From November 17 to 24, NickSplat aired a marathon of all the episodes of the series, nightly from 12:00 to 6:00 AM (ET/PT).

=== Distribution ===
The film premiered on YTV in Canada on January 5, 2018, and had a limited 3-day theatrical premiere in Australia during February 2018 exclusively to certain Hoyts cinemas locations, before airing on Nickelodeon Australia on March 2, 2018.

On March 9, 2018, the film received a one-day limited release at select Showcase Cinemas locations in the United States.

=== Home media ===
The television film was released on DVD in Region 1 on February 13, 2018, by Paramount Home Entertainment. It was then released on DVD in Region 2 on August 13, 2018, by Paramount Home Entertainment.

=== Streaming ===
The television film was released on Hulu on October 1, 2019. Later, it was released on Netflix on November 1, 2019, along with other Nickelodeon TV shows and films, marking a return of Nickelodeon content on Netflix since 2013.

== Reception ==
=== Critical response ===
The A.V. Club graded it with an "A−" complimenting the film for preserving the original series' "warm tone and careful pacing, its willingness to let its young characters absorb dramatic moments and contemplate within silences." IGN.com gave the film a score of 7.5 out of 10, noting "the little, unexpected homages to what made Hey, Arnold! such a joy originally that mark the high points of The Jungle Movie." Den of Geek's Shamus Kelly gave it a score of 3 out of 5, giving a more decidedly mixed opinion of the film, praising the opening moments of the film but criticizing the scenes in San Lorenzo. On Rotten Tomatoes it holds an approval rating of 100% based on 8 reviews, with an average rating of 7.9/10.

=== Ratings ===
The original broadcast of the film was watched by 1.63 million total viewers when it premiered on Nickelodeon with simulcasts on TeenNick and Nicktoons, with a combined 0.46 rating in the 18–49 demo. On Nickelodeon, the film leaked into Nick at Nite, causing the ratings to be reported separately for each hour of the film, since Nielsen considers Nick at Nite a separate network despite being on the same channel. The combined average was 1.268 million total viewers, with 1.390 million total viewers for the Nickelodeon hour and 1.146 million total viewers for the Nick at Nite hour, with an average 0.39 rating in the 18–49 demo. On TeenNick and Nicktoons, the film was watched by 128,000 total viewers (0.04 18–49) and 234,000 total viewers (0.03 18–49), respectively.

=== Awards and nominations ===
Award	Category	Nominee(s)	Result	Ref.
70th Primetime Creative Arts Emmy Awards	Outstanding Individual Achievement in Animation	Stu Livingston	Won	
