= Hey Arnold! =

American animated television series (1996-2004)

- Genre: Animated sitcom; Slice of life
- Created by: Craig Bartlett
- Based on: Arnold shorts by Craig Bartlett
- Developed by: Snee-Oosh, Inc.: Craig Bartlett; Nickelodeon: Joe Ansolabehere; Steve Viksten
- Showrunner: Craig Bartlett
- Creative director: Tuck Tucker
- Voices of: Lane Toran; Phillip Van Dyke; Spencer Klein; Alex D. Linz; Francesca Marie Smith; Jamil Walker Smith; Dan Castellaneta; Tress MacNeille; Justin Shenkarow; Anndi McAfee; Sam Gifaldi; Olivia Hack; Dan Butler; Maurice LaMarche; Kath Soucie; Craig Bartlett; Lauren Robinson; Christopher Walberg; Benjamin Diskin; Adam Wylie; Ashley Buccille; Mary Scheer; Steve Viksten; Dom Irrera; Baoan Coleman; Nika Futterman
- Theme music composer: Jim Lang
- Opening theme: "Hey Arnold!"
- Ending theme: "Stompin'"
- Composer: Jim Lang
- Country of origin: United States
- Original language: English
- No. of seasons: 5
- No. of episodes: 100 (185 segments) (list of episodes)

Production
- Executive producers: Snee-Oosh, Inc.: Craig Bartlett; Nickelodeon: Mary Harrington
- Editor: Christopher Hink
- Running time: 24–47 minutes
- Production companies: Snee-Oosh, Inc.; Games Animation Inc. (seasons 1–2); Nickelodeon Animation Studios (seasons 3–5)

Original release
- Network: Nickelodeon
- Release: October 7, 1996 – June 8, 2004

Hey Arnold! is an American animated sitcom created by Craig Bartlett for Nickelodeon. Produced by Nickelodeon Animation Studios in association with Snee-Oosh, Inc., (Note: Per the end of some seasons 1-2 episodes: "Games Animation Inc. In Association With Snee-Oosh, Inc.") the series originally aired from October 7, 1996, to June 8, 2004. It follows fourth-grader Arnold Shortman, who lives with his grandparents in an inner-city tenement in the fictional city of Hillwood, Washington. The series centers on Arnold's experiences navigating urban life alongside his friends while dealing with various humorous and emotional situations. Although Arnold serves as the main protagonist, many episodes focus on the lives and perspectives of supporting and minor characters.

Bartlett based the series on a minor character named Arnold that he created while working on Pee-wee's Playhouse. After network executives responded positively to the character, Bartlett developed the show's cast and setting using inspiration from people and locations from his childhood in Seattle, Washington, Portland, Oregon, and Brooklyn, New York. Bartlett created the pilot episode in his living room in 1994, and full production began in 1995. The series transitioned from clay animation in its early concept stages to cel animation for its first three seasons, before later adopting digital ink-and-paint techniques for its final two seasons.

Hey Arnold! was among the last series greenlit under the leadership of then-Nickelodeon president Geraldine Laybourne, alongside KaBlam!. Production concluded on December 7, 2001, after five seasons and a total of 100 episodes. The final episode aired unannounced on June 8, 2004. A feature film adaptation, Hey Arnold!: The Movie, was released theatrically on June 28, 2002.

On March 2, 2016, Nickelodeon greenlit a television film continuation titled Hey Arnold!: The Jungle Movie, which continued the story from the original series and resolved several long-running plotlines. The film premiered on November 24, 2017, on Nickelodeon.

== Premise ==
=== Setting ===
Hey Arnold! takes place in the fictional American city of Hillwood. Creator Craig Bartlett described the city as "an amalgam of large northern cities I have loved, including Seattle (my hometown), Portland (where I went to art school) and Brooklyn (the bridge, the brownstones, the subway)"; the city also contains inspirations from Chicago, such as a baseball field called Quigley Field (a reference to the real-life Wrigley Field). Evan Levine of the Houston Chronicle commented on the series's "backdrop of dark streets, nighttime adventures and rundown buildings, all seen from a child's point of view."

At the end of the episode "Road Trip", when Helga and Miriam are returning home after having car troubles en route to South Dakota, they pass a sign marking the Washington State border, implying that Hillwood is in Washington. The Pig War, as re-enacted in the episode of the same title, took place on the boundary between what is now British Columbia and the state of Washington. A bridge that leads to downtown Hillwood resembles Portland's Burnside Bridge, while Gerald's house was modeled after the Victorian houses seen in Nob Hill, Portland.

=== Characters ===
Hey Arnold! features nine-year-old Arnold Shortman (voiced by Lane Toran; Phillip Van Dyke; Spencer Klein; and Alex D. Linz) and his neighborhood friends: Helga Pataki (Francesca Marie Smith), a girl who bullies Arnold in order to hide the fact that she is in love with him, and his best friend Gerald Johanssen (voiced by Jamil Walker Smith).

Arnold lives with his eccentric but loving paternal grandparents, Phil Shortman (Dan Castellaneta) and Gertrude Shortman (Tress MacNeille), proprietors of the Sunset Arms boarding house, in the fictional city of Hillwood. In each episode, he helps a schoolmate or boarding house tenant in solving a personal problem or encounters a predicament of his own. Many episodes involve urban legends (usually told by Gerald), such as superheroes or a variant of the Headless Horseman.

Other characters include students and faculty at P.S. 118, Arnold's school, and citizens of Hillwood. Certain episodes focus on the lives of supporting characters, such as the tenants of the boarding house that Arnold's grandparents own.

Bartlett drew inspiration from people he grew up with when creating the characters for the show.

== Episodes ==
Season	Segments	Episodes	Originally released	
Season	Segments	Episodes	First released	Last released
Pilot			July 10, 1996 (cinemas)	
1	38	20	October 7, 1996	February 12, 1997
2	37	19	September 22, 1997	December 1, 1997
3	38	20	August 31, 1998	March 8, 1999
4	35	19	March 10, 1999	March 11, 2000
5	37	22	March 18, 2000	June 8, 2004
Hey Arnold!: The Movie			June 28, 2002	
Hey Arnold!: The Jungle Movie			November 24, 2017	

== Production ==
Craig Bartlett, the show's creator, was born in Seattle, Washington, which he used as inspiration for the backdrop of Hey Arnold!. He graduated from Anacortes High School and obtained a degree in communications from The Evergreen State College in Olympia, Washington. During high school and college, he studied painting and sculpture at the Museum Art School in Portland. Originally, Bartlett intended to become a painter "in the 19th-century sense", but he became interested in animation during a trip to Italy. His first post-graduation job was at Will Vinton Productions, a claymation studio in Portland.

In 1987, Bartlett relocated to Los Angeles, where he joined a team developing claymation cutaways for the television program Pee-wee's Playhouse. The short segments centered on a character named Penny. Bartlett later made three Arnold shorts: Arnold Escapes from Church (1988), The Arnold Waltz (1990), and Arnold Rides a Chair (1991), the latter aired as a filler short on Sesame Street in 1991. The same year, Arnold comic strips also appeared in Simpsons Illustrated magazine by Bartlett's brother-in-law Matt Groening, the creator of The Simpsons.

Arnold Escapes from Church (1988), the first claymation short to feature Arnold

Bartlett later joined the staff for Rugrats, where he served as story editor for three years. In 1993, he teamed up with five writers from Rugrats to develop animated projects for Nickelodeon. These meetings were generally difficult and the writers became frustrated; Bartlett recalled: "Our ideas were OK, but such a large and motley group couldn't get far at pitch meetings. Network execs got migraines just counting us coming in the door." As a last resort, Bartlett played the Penny tapes, intending to highlight the Penny character. However, the executives were more impressed by Arnold, despite his status as a minor character. After the meeting, the group began developing Arnold, creating his personality. Bartlett stated: "We did a lot of talking about who Arnold is. We came up with a reluctant hero who keeps finding himself responsible for solving something, making the right choices, doing the right thing." After creating ideas for Arnold, Bartlett began work on the supporting characters, drawing influence from his childhood: "A lot of the characters are an amalgam of people I knew when I was a kid. The girls in Hey Arnold! are girls that either liked or didn't like me when I was in school."

In 1994, Bartlett began work on the pilot episode of Hey Arnold!. A year later, the network decided to begin work on the series. The ten-minute pilot episode, titled Arnold, was shown in theaters on July 10, 1996, before Nickelodeon's first feature-length film, its adaptation of Harriet the Spy. Apart from the animation style, Nick's Arnold wears a sweater, with his plaid shirt untucked (resembling a kilt). Only Arnold's cap remains unchanged from his original clay-animation wardrobe.

Hey Arnold! was Nickelodeon's first animated series to feature kids voiced by actual children instead of adults. As a result of this, many of the boy characters, including Arnold himself, were recast at least once throughout the show's run, due to the child actors reaching puberty. One notable exception to this was Jamil Walker Smith, the voice of Gerald. After Smith's voice changed, auditions for a new actor were held, but the crew felt none of them were suitable replacements. As a result, Smith was kept on as the voice of Gerald, whose voice subsequently changed in-universe with the episode "Gerald's Tonsils". This would last until The Jungle Movie, which featured Benjamin Flores Jr. as the voice of Gerald instead.

Production of Hey Arnold! wrapped on December 7, 2001. A dispute over a second then-planned Hey Arnold! movie, The Jungle Movie, resulted in Bartlett leaving Nickelodeon. The last season's episodes were released over four years, beginning on March 4, 2000. The series aired its final episode, unannounced, on June 8, 2004. The Jungle Movie was eventually released as a television film on November 24, 2017.

== Broadcast ==
=== United States ===
Hey Arnold! originally aired on Nickelodeon in the United States from October 7, 1996, until June 8, 2004, with reruns until December 6, 2007. Nicktoons aired reruns of the series from May 1, 2002 to January 1, 2009, plus a special one-time airing on February 11, 2024. The show aired in reruns on the now-defunct Nick on CBS programming block for two years, from September 14, 2002, to September 4, 2004. From September 5, 2011 to January 17, 2022, it aired on TeenNick's now-defunct late night programming block, NickRewind (formerly The '90s are All That, The Splat and NickSplat).

Some of the episodes can now be viewed on the free app Pluto TV under the channel Nickelodeon's 90s Kids.

=== International ===
Hey Arnold! premiered on October 30, 1996, in the United Kingdom, originally on CITV. Hey Arnold! aired in reruns on Canadian Nickelodeon from January 10, 2010, to August 28, 2022. In 2017, the Kenya Film Classification Board banned Hey Arnold!, together with the cartoon series The Loud House, The Legend of Korra from Nickelodeon, Steven Universe, Clarence and Adventure Time from Cartoon Network, from being broadcast in Kenya. According to the Board, the reason was that these series were "glorifying homosexual behavior".

== Critical reception ==
In an article for Vox, Caroline Framke praised Hey Arnold's depiction of adolescence and urban life, stating: "Hey Arnold wove urban legends into its empathetic narrative of how hard it can be to grow up — and how rewarding the process can be when you have some friends and a whole lot of imagination." Rafael Motamayor of /Film echoed that sentiment, writing "Rather than show it as a scary place where every cop show in America is set, Arnold and his friends demonstrated that the city is also a place with endless possibilities, myths, and characters. Not that the show encouraged anything bad; the kids always knew where to go and where not to go. But it showed the reality of millions of kids who grew up in urban areas, and challenged the idea of the perfect American life". Bustle's Marie Grace Goris suggested the series as the "best Nickelodeon cartoon of all time" and gave sixteen reasons why, such as its diverse characters and its ability to "emotionally stir" viewers.

== Attempted spinoff ==
The Patakis was an attempted spinoff of Hey Arnold! that would focus on Helga Pataki as a teenager and would deal with dark topics and themes, including Helga having a habit of writing letters to Arnold (who would date her before moving away) that she would never send to him, her older sister Olga Pataki falling from grace after quitting her teaching job to become a failing actress, and her mother Miriam Pataki being an alcoholic who sought help in dealing with her addiction. The character of Helga's father, Robert "Big Bob" Pataki, would be modeled in the spinoff based on Tony Soprano from the HBO crime drama series The Sopranos. Nickelodeon rejected the spinoff due to its content being deemed "too dark for their network." It was then shopped to Nickelodeon's sister network MTV, which also rejected the show due to its similarities to the network's own animated series Daria. Since then, the spinoff was never materialized.

== Home media ==
Nickelodeon released all five seasons on DVD in Region 1 via Amazon.com through its CreateSpace Manufacture-on-demand program in 2008 and 2009. Season 1 was released on August 21, 2008, Season 2 on August 29, 2008, Season 3 on December 8, 2009, Season 4 on November 27, 2009, and Season 5 on December 4, 2009.

CreateSpace Releases	Release Date	Discs	Episodes
Season 1	August 21, 2008	4	20
Season 2	August 29, 2008	4	19
Season 3: Volume 1 & Volume 2	December 8, 2009	6	20
Season 4	November 27, 2009	4	17
Season 5	December 4, 2009	4	24

On May 9, 2011, it was announced that Shout! Factory had acquired the rights to the series. They subsequently released Season 1 in a 4-disc set on August 9, 2011. Season 2, Part 1 was released in a 2-disc set on March 20, 2012, followed by Season 2, Part 2 in a 2-disc set on July 24, 2012. Season 3 was released in a 3-disc set on January 29, 2013, as a "Shout Select" title. On May 14, 2013, Season 4 was released in a 2-disc set as a Shout exclusive followed by Season 5 released in a 3-disc set on October 15, 2013, also as a Shout exclusive making the entire series available on DVD. On August 19, 2014, the complete series was released in a 16-disc set through Shout! Factory as a Walmart exclusive. On November 20, 2018, Paramount Home Entertainment released Hey Arnold!: The Ultimate Collection DVD containing all of the previously released episodes and movies now packaged into one set.

In Australia, all five seasons have been released by Beyond Home Entertainment under license from Nickelodeon. A 16-disc collector's edition was released on September 1, 2016, containing all five seasons.

DVD Name	Episodes	# of Discs	Release Date	
DVD Name	Episodes	# of Discs	Region 1	Region 4
Season 1	20	4	August 9, 2011	April 3, 2013
Season 2, Part 1 Season 2, Part 2	19	4	March 20, 2012; July 24, 2012	April 3, 2013 (complete)
Season 3♦	20	3	January 29, 2013	June 3, 2015
Season 4♦	17	2	May 14, 2013	June 3, 2015
Season 5♦	24	3	October 15, 2013	September 1, 2015
The Complete Series	100	16	August 19, 2014	September 1, 2016
The Ultimate Collection	100, 2 Movies	18	November 20, 2018	

♦ – Shout! Factory select title sold exclusively through Shout's online store.

== Films ==
=== 2002 feature film ===
In this 2002 feature film, Arnold, Helga and Gerald set out on a quest to save their old neighborhood from a greedy developer who plans on converting it into a huge shopping mall. This film was directed by Tuck Tucker, and featured guest voice talents of Jennifer Jason Leigh, Paul Sorvino and Christopher Lloyd.

In 1998, Nickelodeon gave Craig Bartlett the chance to develop a feature adaptation of the series. As work on the fifth season was completing, Bartlett and company engaged in the production of Arnold Saves the Neighborhood, which would eventually become Hey Arnold!: The Movie. The Neighborhood project was originally made for television and home video, but executives at Paramount Pictures decided to release it theatrically after successful test screenings. According to animation historian Jerry Beck (in his Animated Movie Guide), the decision was buoyed by the financial success of the first two Rugrats movies, The Rugrats Movie and Rugrats in Paris: The Movie.

=== 2017 television film ===
In an interview with Arun Mehta, Craig Bartlett announced that he was working with Nickelodeon on a Hey Arnold! revival. In September 2015, Nickelodeon president Russell Hicks announced that the company was considering revivals for a number of their older shows, including Hey Arnold!. According to an announcement by The Independent, a Hey Arnold! revival is "very much on the cards". On November 23, 2015, Nickelodeon announced that a TV movie is in the works and will pick up right where the series left off. The film will also answer unanswered questions about the fate of Arnold's parents. On March 1, 2016, it was announced that the TV film, The Jungle Movie, would be divided into two parts and would air in 2017. On March 6, 2016, voice actress Nika Futterman confirmed on Twitter that she and her character Olga Pataki would appear in the two-hour film. In June 2016, it was confirmed that the TV film would be titled The Jungle Movie, and that 19 of the original voice actors from the series would lend their voices in the film. New cast-members included Mason Vale Cotton as Arnold; Benjamin "Lil' P-Nut" Flores as Gerald; Gavin Lewis as Eugene; Jet Jurgensmeyer as Stinky; Aiden Lewandowski as Sid; Laya Hayes as Nadine; Nicolas Cantu as Curly; Wally Wingert as Oskar; Stephen Stanton as Pigeon Man; and Alfred Molina as the villain Lasombra. The film debuted on November 24, 2017, on Nickelodeon.

== Future ==
Before the premiere of The Jungle Movie, Nickelodeon stated that if the ratings of the film would succeed they would consider rebooting the series. Though the ratings were a success with millennials, it ended up missing the mark with Generation Z, so the idea of bringing back the show on Nickelodeon was scrapped. However, in August 2018, musical composer for the show Jim Lang revealed in a Tunes/Toons podcast that while Nick will not produce the show at the studio due to the poor ratings of The Jungle Movie, he said that: "Netflix, Amazon, Apple were all people that they were going to go out to with the idea of trying to make a season six of Hey Arnold!. We haven't heard anything yet, but we've got our fingers crossed." In October 2019, Craig Bartlett revealed in an interview with The Arun Mehta Show that Hey Arnold! could come back as a series with the characters aged up for season 6 if the Rugrats reboot is successful.

== Soundtrack ==
Hey Arnold! The Music, Volume 1 was released on July 3, 2020 as a vinyl record, marking the first-ever official release of the show's music. The soundtrack included 45 minutes of previously unreleased music that had been remastered from the original audio files by Emmy Award-winning sound engineer Dave Marino in conjunction with show composer Jim Lang, as well as new original exclusive artwork done by Bartlett.
