= Craig Bartlett =

American animator (born 1956)

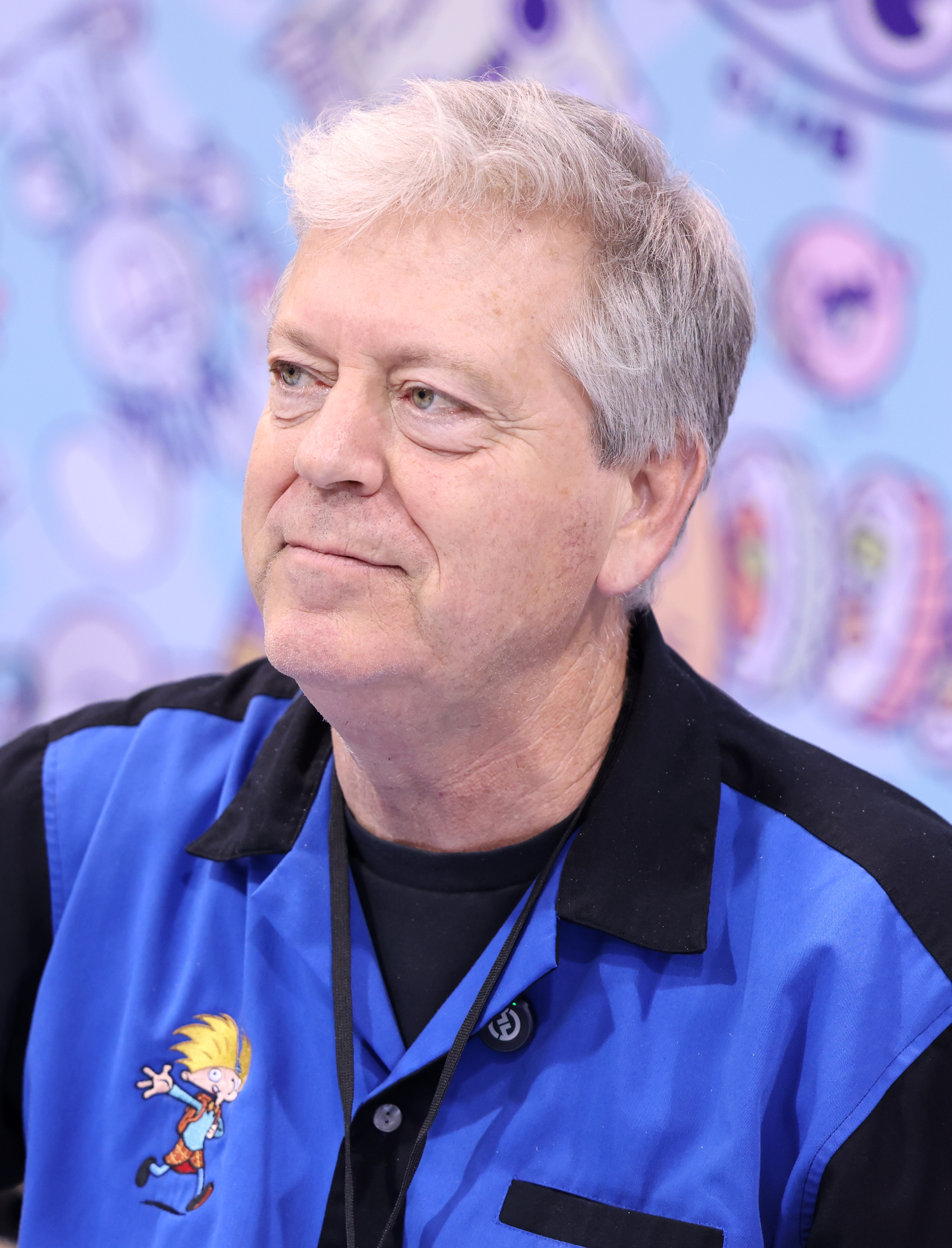
- Bartlett in 2026
- Born: Craig Michael Bartlett; October 18, 1956 (age 70); Seattle, Washington, U.S.
- Education: Evergreen State College
- Occupations: Animator, writer, storyboard artist, director, producer, voice actor
- Years active: 1985–present
- Known for: Hey Arnold! (1994–2004, 2017); Fun Street (2005–2021); Dinosaur Train (2009–2021); Ready Jet Go! (2016–2019)
- Spouse: Lisa Groening (m. 1987; sep. 2015)
- Children: 2
- Relatives: Matt Groening (former brother-in-law)

Craig Michael Bartlett (born October 18, 1956) is an American animator. He wrote, directed, created, and produced the Nickelodeon television series Hey Arnold! and the PBS Kids television series Dinosaur Train and Ready Jet Go!.

== Career ==
Bartlett's first job, after graduating from the Evergreen State College in Olympia, Washington, was at Will Vinton Studios in Portland, Oregon, where he learned the art of stop-motion animation, creating on movies such as The Adventures of Mark Twain. Bartlett moved to Los Angeles in 1987 to animate the "Penny" claymations for the second season of Pee-wee's Playhouse on CBS. He later made an animated ID for NBC with Klasky Csupo.

He later worked at BRC Imagination Arts, directing projects such as Postcards and Mystery Lodge for Knott's Berry Farm. He also animated the music video for "Jurassic Park" by "Weird Al" Yankovic from the 1993 album Alapalooza.

Bartlett met the Nickelodeon execs while story editing Rugrats in its first three seasons, as well as directing three episodes of The Ren & Stimpy Show. He pitched Hey Arnold! to them in the fall of 1993 and produced a pilot the next spring. The series was greenlit in January 1995 and would be in production continuously from 1995 to 2001, being produced by Nickelodeon Animation Studio in association with Snee-Oosh, Inc., which Bartlett founded in 1986. The series culminated in a TV movie originally titled Arnold Saves the Neighborhood, but Nickelodeon decided to release it theatrically as Hey Arnold!: The Movie, in June 2002.

A dispute over a second planned Arnold movie resulted in Bartlett leaving Nickelodeon to write, direct and produce an animated TV movie for Cartoon Network called Party Wagon, a story originally intended as a pilot for an ongoing series. It ended up being the first Cartoon Network movie-length pilot to be broadcast, but not picked up until Underfist: Halloween Bash, which was created by Maxwell Atoms, who created The Grim Adventures of Billy & Mandy and Evil Con Carne.

In 2002, he published the official novelization of the first Hey Arnold! movie (having written it with Maggie Groening; ISBN 978-0-6898-5136-0).

In 2005, Bartlett returned to BRC to make a multimedia simulator attraction for NASA's Kennedy Space Center in Cape Canaveral, Florida, called the Shuttle Launch Experience. In the course of the three-year project, Bartlett interviewed 26 astronauts to gather their experiences from launch to orbit. One of these was four-time shuttle flier and commander and current NASA Administrator Charles F. Bolden Jr.

After developing various pilots and feature scripts, Bartlett moved to The Jim Henson Company, where he co-wrote the animated film Unstable Fables: 3 Pigs and a Baby. He stayed at Henson to work as story editor on a PBS Kids preschool show called Sid the Science Kid with PBS executive Linda Simensky, whom he had worked with at Nickelodeon and Cartoon Network.

In September 2008, a show for preschoolers called Dinosaur Train was picked up by PBS Kids; produced by The Jim Henson Company, this was the first show created by Bartlett to be picked up since Hey Arnold!. The series debuted on PBS stations on September 7, 2009.

In April 2015, Ready Jet Go! (formerly Jet Propulsion) was also picked up by PBS Kids. Produced by Wind Dancer Films in association with Snee-Oosh, Inc., the series premiered on PBS stations on February 15, 2016.

In November 2015, Viacom announced that Bartlett would return to Nickelodeon to write Hey Arnold!: The Jungle Movie. It premiered on November 24, 2017.

== Personal life ==
Bartlett attended and graduated from Anacortes High School in Anacortes, Washington. In 1987, Bartlett married Lisa Groening, sister of Matt Groening, creator of The Simpsons, Futurama and Disenchantment, after whom Lisa Simpson is named. They have two children, Matt and Katie. In August 2018, it was reported that Craig and Lisa were going through a divorce settlement and that they had been separated since 2015. Bartlett is highly fond of jazz music, as composer Jim Lang has scored all his created series. Bartlett is also a huge fan of popular culture, ranging from The Beatles, Elvis Presley, Frank Sinatra, and David Bowie to Star Wars, Star Trek, The Wizard of Oz, Titanic, Peanuts, and the films of Hayao Miyazaki.

== Filmography ==
Year	Title	Role	Notes
1985	The Adventures of Mark Twain	Calaveras Miner (voice)	Claymation artist, voice actor
1985	Return to Oz		Claymation artist
1986–1990	Pee-wee's Playhouse		Animator for Penny cartoons
1987	A Claymation Christmas Celebration		Claymation artist
1988	Meet the Raisins!		Writer
1988	Arnold Escapes from Church		Producer, director, writer, animator
1990	The Arnold Waltz		Producer, director, writer, animator
1991	Arnold Rides His Chair		Director
1991–1994	Rugrats		Story editor, writer, director, storyboard artist (segment "Stu-Makers' Elves")
1994–2004	Hey Arnold!	Brainy, Abner the Pig, Ned, Miles Shortman, others (voice)	Creator, developer, executive producer, story, writer, director, voice actor
1995	The Ren & Stimpy Show	Oldman Farmer Höek, additional voices	Director, voice actor
2002	Hey Arnold!: The Movie	Brainy, Murray, Grubby, Monkeyman (voice)	Producer, writer, voice actor
2004	Johnny Bravo		Writer, story editor
2004	Party Wagon	Romeo Jones, Ferryman #2, Cheyenne #1 (voice)	Creator, storyboard artist, producer, director, voice actor
2008	Unstable Fables		Co-writer
2008–2013	Sid the Science Kid		Story editor, writer
2009–2020	Dinosaur Train	Spider (voice)	Creator, writer, executive producer, director, voice actor
2013	Sky Rat		Creator, executive producer, storyboard artist, writer, director
2016–2019	Ready Jet Go!		Creator, executive producer, writer, director
2017	Hey Arnold!: The Jungle Movie	Miles Shortman, Brainy, Abner the Pig, Monkeyman (voice)	Executive producer, series based on, writer, voice actor and voice director
2021	Dinosaur Train: Adventure Island		Executive producer, writer and co-director
2023	Frog and Toad		Screenwriter
2024	Primos		Additional animation

=== Internet ===
Year	Title	Role	Notes
2016–2017	Nickelodeon Animation Podcast	Episode 12: "Craig Bartlett"; Episode 49: "Making of an Iconic Theme Song"; Episode 50: "Hey Arnold! Deep Dive"	Podcast
