= List of Hong Kong films of 1995 =

Hong Kong feature-length films released in 1995

This article lists feature-length Hong Kong films released in 1995.

== Box office ==
The highest-grossing Hong Kong films released in 1995, by domestic box office gross revenue, are as follows:

Highest-grossing films released in 1995
Rank	Title	Domestic gross
1	Rumble in the Bronx	HK$56,912,536
2	Thunderbolt	HK$45,675,610
3	Sixty Million Dollar Man	HK$35,236,551
4	Full Throttle	HK$33,770,736
5	The Chinese Feast	HK$31,128,196
6	A Chinese Odyssey Part One: Pandora's Box	HK$25,200,435
7	Peace Hotel	HK$24,837,183
8	A Chinese Odyssey Part Two: Cinderella	HK$20,885,543
9	Mack the Knife	HK$16,812,931
10	Out of the Dark	HK$16,281,325

== Releases ==
Title	Director	Cast	Genre	Notes
1995
01:00 A.M.	Wilson Yip			
The Adventurers	Ringo Lam	Andy Lau, Rosamund Kwan, Jacklyn Wu, Paul Chun, David Chiang	Action	
Against the Blade of Honour				
Ancient Heroes				
Angel Hearts	Fu Lap			
Angel on Fire	Philip Ko Fei			
The Armed Policewoman	Cheung Gon Man			
Asian Connection	David Lam			
Because of Lies	Lee Gwok Laap			
Black Dream	Joe Hau			
Black Sun: The Nanking Massacre	He Chi Chiang			
The Blade	Tsui Hark	Vincent Zhao, Moses Chan, Hung Yan-yan, Song Lei, Austin Wai, Michael Tse, Valerie Chow, Jason Chu	Martial arts	
Bugis Street	Yonfan	Michael Lam, Hiep Thi Le		
A Chinese Odyssey	Jeffrey Lau	Stephen Chow, Athena Chu, Ng Man-tat, Law Kar-ying, Jeffrey Lau, Yammie Lam, Karen Mok, Ada Choi	Comedy	Duology
Don't Give a Damn	Sammo Hung	Sammo Hung, Yuen Biao, Takeshi Kaneshiro, Kathy Chow, Timmy Hung	Action	
Faithfully Yours	Victor Tam	Emil Chau, Cecilia Yip, Christy Chung	Romance	
Fallen Angels	Wong Kar-wai	Leon Lai, Takeshi Kaneshiro, Michelle Reis, Charlie Yeung and Karen Mok		
Farewell My Dearest	Kam Cheong Chan	Simon Yam		
Fatal Assignment	Peter Yuen Ying-Ming	Fiona Leung Ngai-Ling, Roger Kwok Chun-On, Sin-hung Tam	Crime	
Fatal Memory	Saik Pin Yeo	Wilson Lam	Crime	Television film
Full Throttle	Derek Yee	Andy Lau, Gigi Leung, David Wu, Paul Chun, Chin Kar-lok	Drama	
The Golden Girls		Ada Choi		
Happy Hour	Benny Chan	Julian Cheung, Jordan Chan, Andy Hui, Moses Chan	Drama	
Heaven Can't Wait	Lee Chi Ngai	Tony Leung, Jordan Chan, Bowie Lam, Karen Mok, Jerry Lamb, Alex To, Kent Cheng, Lawrence Cheng, Richard Ng, Moses Chan, Anita Yuen, Law Kar-ying	Drama	
High Risk	Wong Jing	Jet Li, Jacky Cheung	Action / martial arts / comedy	
Hong Kong Graffiti	Teddy Robin Kwan	Kevin Cheng, Teddy Robin Kwan, Raymond Cho	Drama	
Iron Monkey 2	Yuen Woo-ping	Donnie Yen, Billy Chow	Action	
My Father Is a Hero	Corey Yuen	Jet Li, Anita Mui, Tse Miu, Yu Rongguang, Blackie Ko, Damian Lau, Ken Lo, Collin Chou	Action / martial arts	
Out of the Dark	Jeffrey Lau	Stephen Chow, Karen Mok	Comedy horror	
The Phantom Lover	Ronnie Yu	Leslie Cheung		
Red Wolf	Yuen Woo-ping	Collin Chou	Action / thriller	
Rumble in the Bronx	Stanley Tong	Jackie Chan, Anita Mui, Françoise Yip	Action / comedy	
The Saint of Gamblers	Wong Jing	Eric Kot, Ng Man-tat, Chingmy Yau, Donnie Yen	Comedy	
Sixty Million Dollar Man	Wai Man Yip	Stephen Chow, Ng Man Tat, Gigi Leung	Comedy	
Summer Snow	Ann Hui	Josephine Siao, Roy Chiao, Sin-hung Tam	Comedy-drama	
Those Were the Days...	Leung Choi Yuen	Francis Ng, Bowie Lam, Maggie Shiu	Drama	TV movie
Thunderbolt	Jackie Chan	Jackie Chan, Anita Yuen, Dayo Wong, Thorsten Nickel		
Whatever Will Be, Will Be	Jacob Cheung	Aaron Kwok, Kelly Chen	Musical and drama	
Wind Beneath the Wings	Andy Chin	Valarie Chow, Moses Chan, Yu Rongguang, Eugina Lau, Dayo Wong, Joe Junior	Drama	
Young Policemen in Love				
