= Nickelodeon Kart Racers =

2018 video game

- Cover art featuring SpongeBob SquarePants, Patrick Star, Tommy Pickles, Helga Pataki, Leonardo and Raphael
- Developer: Bamtang Games
- Publishers: NA: GameMill Entertainment; EU: Maximum Games
- Director: Adam Johnston
- Producer: Stephanie Villalobos
- Designer: Rodrigo Hidalgo
- Programmers: Edward Nancay; Carlos Madrazo
- Artists: Ivan Olarte; Miguel Almeida
- Composer: Charles Loli
- Series: Nicktoons
- Engine: Vector Engine
- Platforms: Nintendo Switch; PlayStation 4 Xbox One
- Release: NA: October 23, 2018; EU: October 26, 2018
- Genre: Racing
- Modes: Single-player, Multiplayer

Nickelodeon Kart Racers is a 2018 racing game developed by Bamtang Games and published by GameMill Entertainment in North America and Maximum Games in Europe. The game features Nickelodeon characters in a crossover, including SpongeBob SquarePants, Hey Arnold!, Teenage Mutant Ninja Turtles, and Rugrats. The game was released in North America on October 23, 2018, and in Europe on October 26, 2018, for Nintendo Switch, PlayStation 4, and Xbox One. A sequel, Nickelodeon Kart Racers 2: Grand Prix, was released in October 2020. A third entry, Nickelodeon Kart Racers 3: Slime Speedway, was released on October 14, 2022.

== Gameplay ==
Nickelodeon Kart Racers features a selection of twelve playable characters from SpongeBob SquarePants, Hey Arnold!, Teenage Mutant Ninja Turtles, and Rugrats. 24 courses and 8 arenas based on different locations from the shows are included in the game.

It also has a team-based co-op mode, where two players can use a hammer to stop every other team and get an advantage. The karts can be customized and power-ups can be picked up from the courses. Kart parts, including tires, engines, spoilers, jet skis, and paint jobs, can be purchased using coins collected from the courses. Courses that entirely consist of slime include slalom and elimination modes.

=== Playable characters ===
- Angelica Pickles (Rugrats)
- Arnold Shortman (Hey Arnold!)
- Donatello (Teenage Mutant Ninja Turtles)
- Helga Pataki (Hey Arnold!)
- Leonardo (Teenage Mutant Ninja Turtles)
- Michelangelo (Teenage Mutant Ninja Turtles)
- Patrick Star (SpongeBob SquarePants)
- Raphael (Teenage Mutant Ninja Turtles)
- Reptar (Rugrats)
- Sandy Cheeks (SpongeBob SquarePants)
- SpongeBob SquarePants (SpongeBob SquarePants)
- Tommy Pickles (Rugrats)

== Development ==
The game was announced on July 25, 2018. A trailer for the game was released on September 13, 2018.

== Reception ==
Reception

Aggregate score
Aggregator	Score
Metacritic	42/100 (PS4); 41/100 (NS); 49/100 (XONE)

Review scores
Publication	Score
Nintendo Life	3/10
Official Xbox Magazine (UK)	5/10

Nickelodeon Kart Racers received "generally unfavorable" reviews on all platforms according to the review aggregation website Metacritic.

Nintendo Life gave the game a 3/10, criticizing it for the roster size which only consists of two to four characters from four different shows while lacking characters from other popular Nickelodeon shows such as The Fairly OddParents, Invader Zim, The Adventures of Jimmy Neutron, Boy Genius, Avatar: The Last Airbender, and The Loud House. They also criticized the game for the lack of voice acting. PlayStation LifeStyle gave the game a slightly higher score of 5.5/10, stating that "while [it] provides plenty of content and has smart references that integrate well with some very solid racing, the poor visuals and botched battle mode leave plenty to be desired. If you accept the game for what it is there's definitely some fun to be had but its shortcomings are jarring enough to require some substantial blinders."

Chris Wray of Wccftech panned the PlayStation 4 version with a 2/10, stating that "with basic at best visuals, terrible audio design and quality, as well as just downright bland kart racing, this isn't the kart racer for you."

== See also ==
- DreamWorks All-Star Kart Racing
