= Nickelodeon Kart Racers 2: Grand Prix =

2020 video game

- Cover art featuring (clockwise from top) Korra, GIR, Ren and Stimpy, JoJo Siwa, Lincoln, SpongeBob and Michelangelo
- Developer: Bamtang Games (Note: Additional work by Vector Unit)
- Publishers: NA: GameMill Entertainment; EU: Maximum Games
- Director: Adam Johnston
- Producers: Jennifer Semeler; Pitu Kong
- Designers: Carlos Salazar; Mauricio Morales
- Programmer: Edward Nancay
- Artist: Ivan Olarte
- Composer: Carlos Bozzo
- Series: Nicktoons
- Platforms: Nintendo Switch; PlayStation 4; Xbox One; Windows; Android; iOS
- Release: Nintendo Switch, PlayStation 4, Xbox One; October 6, 2020; Windows; December 1, 2020; Android, iOS; February 24, 2022
- Genre: Racing
- Modes: Single-player, multiplayer

Nickelodeon Kart Racers 2: Grand Prix is a racing game developed by Bamtang Games and published by GameMill Entertainment in North America, Maximum Games in Europe, and Ripples Asia Venture in Japan. A sequel to 2018's Nickelodeon Kart Racers, it was released for Nintendo Switch, PlayStation 4, and Xbox One on October 6, 2020, and for Windows on December 1, 2020. Mobile versions for Android and iOS were later released on February 24, 2022. A sequel, titled Nickelodeon Kart Racers 3: Slime Speedway, was released in October 2022.

== Gameplay ==
Nickelodeon Kart Racers 2: Grand Prix features a selection of 30 playable racers, consisting of characters from 12 different Nicktoons and real-life actress JoJo Siwa. Each character has different gameplay statistics such as top speed and handling, which can be further altered by customizing their kart with different unlockable vehicle parts. There are also 70 non-playable "pit crew" characters based on these shows, made up of 20 "chiefs" and 50 "crew", with players able to equip one chief and two crew before each race. Chief characters will give the player an additional ability they can activate at any time during the race, such as a sudden speed boost or temporary shield; each use requires players to first fill a slime meter by driving through slime or collecting slime tokens on the track. Crew characters grant abilities that are automatically activated under specific circumstances, such as giving the player a speed boost after they are struck by an item or obstacle, or collecting only a specific item from item containers; once used, these abilities have a cooldown period and cannot be activated again until a certain amount of time has passed.

The game includes 28 race tracks based on different locations from the represented shows, including four remastered from its predecessor, and two battle arenas based on Double Dare and the Kids' Choice Awards. Each track features slime sources to recharge chief abilities, speed boosters to gain an extra burst of speed, containers with items that can be used to hinder opponents, and shortcuts which often require more skilled play to access. Players can also trigger additional speed boosts during the race by continuously drifting around turns or performing tricks when launching off jumps. Players can choose between four speed classes for races, ranging from "slow" to "insane". The game features a single-player grand prix mode, which challenges players to complete sequences of four races with the highest overall rank; a time trial mode for players to complete a lap on each track in the shortest time possible; and a challenge mode consisting of 42 preset scenarios which the player must complete. Players can unlock new characters, pit crew and vehicle parts by winning every grand prix in each speed class and completing every challenge. Additional vehicle parts can be purchased from the in-game garage by spending slime tokens obtained through races; a total of 80 vehicle parts can be unlocked. The game also supports local multiplayer for up to four players, as well as online multiplayer for up to eight players, a feature that was not in its predecessor.

=== Playable characters ===
- Aang (Avatar: The Last Airbender)
- Angelica Pickles (Rugrats)
- Arnold Shortman (Hey Arnold!)
- CatDog (CatDog)
- Chuckie Finster (Rugrats)
- Clyde McBride (The Loud House)
- Danny Phantom (Danny Phantom)
- Donatello (Teenage Mutant Ninja Turtles)
- Gerald Johanssen (Hey Arnold!)
- GIR (Invader Zim)
- Heffer Wolfe (Rocko's Modern Life)
- Helga Pataki (Hey Arnold!)
- JoJo Siwa (The JoJo and BowBow Show Show)
- Korra (The Legend of Korra)
- Leonardo (Teenage Mutant Ninja Turtles)
- Lincoln Loud (The Loud House)
- Lucy Loud (The Loud House)
- Michelangelo (Teenage Mutant Ninja Turtles)
- Patrick Star (SpongeBob SquarePants)
- Raphael (Teenage Mutant Ninja Turtles)
- Ren (The Ren & Stimpy Show)
- Reptar (Rugrats)
- Rocko (Rocko's Modern Life)
- Sandy Cheeks (SpongeBob SquarePants)
- Shredder (Teenage Mutant Ninja Turtles)
- SpongeBob SquarePants (SpongeBob SquarePants)
- Squidward Tentacles (SpongeBob SquarePants)
- Stimpy (The Ren & Stimpy Show)
- Tommy Pickles (Rugrats)
- Zim (Invader Zim)

== Development ==
Nickelodeon Kart Racers 2: Grand Prix was leaked by Target on June 10, 2020, and was announced on June 11, 2020. A trailer for the game was released the same day as its announcement. A simplified mobile version developed by Kung Fu Factory was released on February 24, 2022 under the name Nickelodeon Kart Racers. Unlike the console versions, it incorporates free-to-play elements and utilizes motion and touch controls.

== Reception ==
Reception

Aggregate scores
Aggregator	Score
Metacritic	(PS4) 58/100 (XONE) 69/100 (NS) 72/100
OpenCritic	50% recommend

Review score
Publication	Score
Nintendo Life	7/10

Nickelodeon Kart Racers 2: Grand Prix received "mixed or average" reviews according to review aggregator website Metacritic, though scores were consistently higher than those of its predecessor. Fellow review aggregator OpenCritic assessed that the game received fair approval, being recommended by 50% of critics. Nintendo Life called it "everything the original game should have been" and stated that it "will appeal far more to Nickelodeon fans new and old." However, they criticized the lack of voice acting.
