= Those Were the Days (1996 film) =

1996 Hong Kong film by Eric Tsang

Those Were the Days (4 個 32A 和一個香蕉少年)
- Film poster
- Directed by: Eric Tsang
- Screenplay by: James Yuen; Lam Oi-Wah; Clara Yuen-Yin Wong
- Produced by: Eric Tsang
- Starring: Loletta Lee; Karen Mok; Amanda Lee; Linda Wong
- Production company: United Filmmakers Organisation
- Release date: 7 June 1996 (Hong Kong)
- Running time: 101 minutes
- Country: Hong Kong
- Language: Cantonese

Those Were the Days (Chinese: 4 個 32A 和一個香蕉少年) is a 1996 Hong Kong comedy drama film directed by Eric Tsang. It is a coming-of-age story about four friends who went to an all-girls secondary school together.

== Cast ==
- Loletta Lee - adult Minnie Liu
- Kong Lai Na (Leila Tong) - young Minnie Liu
- Karen Mok - adult Patricia
- Annie Man - young Patricia
- Amanda Lee - Informant
- Linda Wong - Bamboo
- Eric Tsang - Mr. Liu (Minnie's Father)
- Josie Ho - Liu Man Sze (Minnie's oldest sister)
- Gregory Charles Rivers - George Hamcatcher (Liu Man Sze husband)
- Longman Leung - Minnie's brother-in-law
- Jordan Chan - Super
- Julian Cheung - Chan Yan Kin (teacher)
- Karsin Bak - Miss Lee (teacher)
- Joyce Tang - Jackie
- Michael Lam - Norman
- Chin Kar Lok
