= High Risk (1995 film) =

1995 Hong Kong film by Wong Jing

- Hong Kong film poster

Chinese name
- Traditional Chinese: 鼠膽龍威
- Simplified Chinese: 鼠胆龙威
Transcriptions
Standard Mandarin
- Hanyu Pinyin: Shú Dán Lóng Wěi
Yue: Cantonese
- Jyutping: Syu2 Daam2 Lung4 Wai1
- Directed by: Wong Jing
- Written by: Wong Jing
- Produced by: Wong Jing
- Starring: Jet Li; Jacky Cheung; Chingmy Yau; Charlie Yeung; Yang Chung-hsien
- Cinematography: Lau Moon-tong
- Edited by: Angie Lam
- Music by: Jussi Tegelman; Richard Yuen
- Production company: Wong Jing's Workshop Limited
- Distributed by: Upland Films Corporation Limited
- Release date: 13 July 1995
- Running time: 101 minutes
- Country: Hong Kong
- Language: Cantonese
- Box office: $11,403,790

High Risk (released under the alternative title Meltdown in the United States and Super Bodyguard in the Philippines) is a 1995 Hong Kong action comedy film written, produced and directed by Wong Jing and starring Jet Li, Jacky Cheung, Chingmy Yau, Charlie Yeung and Yang Chung-hsien. Corey Yuen serves as the film's fight choreographer. The film follows Kit Li (Li), a Hong Kong cop who loses his wife and son in a bus bombing, as he teams up with Frankie Lone (Cheung)—a famous but secretly cowardly martial arts film star—to take down the criminal gang responsible for the attack.

The film is a parody of some of Hollywood's most influential action films, such as Die Hard and Speed.

== Plot ==
Kit Li, a cop on the Hong Kong Police bomb squad, responds to a call at a local school, where a terrorist group led by an individual calling himself "The Doctor" has taken a school bus hostage. He soon discovers his wife and son are on board the explosives-rigged bus. The bus eventually explodes, killing everyone inside.

Two years later in Hong Kong, Kit has left the force and now serves as a stunt double for martial arts action star Frankie Lone. However, Helen, a tabloid reporter, films one of his stunts and thus discovers Lone's duplicity, using it to boost her show's ratings. Frankie's father and his manager invite Kit to a jewelry exhibition at a newly opened highrise hotel, but the Doctor also targets the exhibition. At a traffic stop, Kit overhears the Doctor uttering a catchphrase that he used during the school bus bombing, and realizing the Doctor's identity, he follows the car back to the hotel.

The Doctor and his team take over the building and initiate a massacre. Kit and his partner Chow arrive, only to find themselves ambushed by the Doctor's gang members in a shootout, during which Chow is injured. Frankie manages to escape and runs into Fai. Kit and Chow thin out the Doctor's numbers after driving a car out of the freight elevator. Frankie's father wrestles a weapon away from a terrorist and threatens the hacker trying to deactivate the exhibit's security measures. Chow is reunited with his girlfriend Joyce. Kit tries to kill the Doctor in revenge when the villain mocks him, but the attempt tips the scales back in the terrorists' favor. Kit, Helen and Frankie's father barely manage to escape.

Helen runs into a room with an exhibit of poisonous reptiles, places the videotape underneath a display case and hides in the men's washroom. The Doctor's younger brother, Rabbit, throws some of the snakes into the bathroom, poisoning her in the process. Kit and the Lones rescue Helen, administering anti-venom serum, and Kit learns that Helen managed to record the Doctor's face in her footage.

Meanwhile, the Doctor warns the police that if they do not meet his impossible demands, he will toss a hostage out the window every ten minutes, with Frankie's manager Charlie Tso as the first victim. The Lones meet Fai and Kong in the midst of an argument that has escalated into a fight. The Lones intervene, unaware of Fai's true colors, until she holds them at gunpoint and returns them to the other hostages. Kit retrieves the tape and successfully kills Rabbit before escaping a grenade blast and landing in police custody. The police refuse to let Kit go back into the hotel, so Kit forces the desk sergeant he encountered earlier to let him return via helicopter at gunpoint.

The Doctor intercepts a police transmission and sends his men to ambush the helicopter. Helen manages to warn Kit, who rams the helicopter into the building. In the resulting chaos everyone escapes, but Frankie, his father, Chow and Joyce are intercepted by Fai and Kong. Fai is about to murder Chow, but Chow seizes her gun and shoots her dead. Kong attacks Frankie's entourage, but when he begins punching Frankie's father, Frankie retaliates and kills Kong.

The Doctor captures Helen and takes her to the roof. Kit finds Helen with a bomb strapped to her, and the Doctor taunts him to choose between taking revenge on him or saving the life of another loved one. Kit throws a knife, hitting the Doctor in the shoulder before the latter escapes. Kit finds out that the wiring is the same as the last bomb, and this time successfully defuses it. During the defusal, he gets a call from the Doctor. Kit informs the Doctor that the dagger he threw was coated with snake venom from Helen's wound. The Doctor dies in agony, and his body is looted by a trio of passing teenagers.

Frankie decides to use the incident as the basis for his new movie, while crediting everyone for their heroics. Kit, however, leaves with Helen, who expresses her gratitude with her willingness to start a relationship with him.

== Cast ==
- Jet Li as Kit Li – Kit used to work for the police, but left the force after losing his wife and son in a bomb threat he thought he had defused. He later became the personal bodyguard of Frankie and would even perform stunts for him when Frankie was inebriated. He is an expert martial artist and fights most of the major villains throughout most of the film.
- Jacky Cheung as Frankie Lone, a famous and popular action movie star famous for doing all of his own stunts. In reality, he is very lazy and lecherous. His character is assumed to be a spoof of Jackie Chan and Bruce Lee; he even wears Lee's iconic yellow jump suit from Game of Death.
- Chingmy Yau as Helen Vu
- Charlie Yeung as Joyce, one of the women working at the Hotel Grandeur. She is the reluctant girlfriend of rookie detective Chow Kam.
- Yang Chung-hsien as Det. Chow Kam, a rookie policeman
- Kelvin Wong as The Doctor
- Valerie Chow as Fai-Fai, the Doctor's partner
- Billy Chow as Kong, one of the Doctor's henchmen. He is obsessed with Frankie Lone, even to the point of fantasizing about defeating him in a fight.
- Ben Lam as Rabbit, The Doctor's sadistic younger brother
- Charlie Cho as Charlie Tso – Frankie Lone's manager. Killed by the Doctor when he is thrown off the balcony of the Hotel Grandeur.
- Suki Kwan as Li's Wife
- Wu Ma as Frankie Lone's father

== Release ==
High Risk was released theatrically in Hong Kong on 13 July 1995.

=== Reception ===
The film grossed a modest HK$11,403,790 in Hong Kong, where it was released as 鼠胆龍威 (High Risk, Rat's bravery and Dragon's might), which parodies the title of Die Hard (虎膽龍威 Tiger's bravery and Dragon's might) in Hong Kong.

== See also ==
- List of Hong Kong films of 1995
