= Justin Shenkarow =

American actor

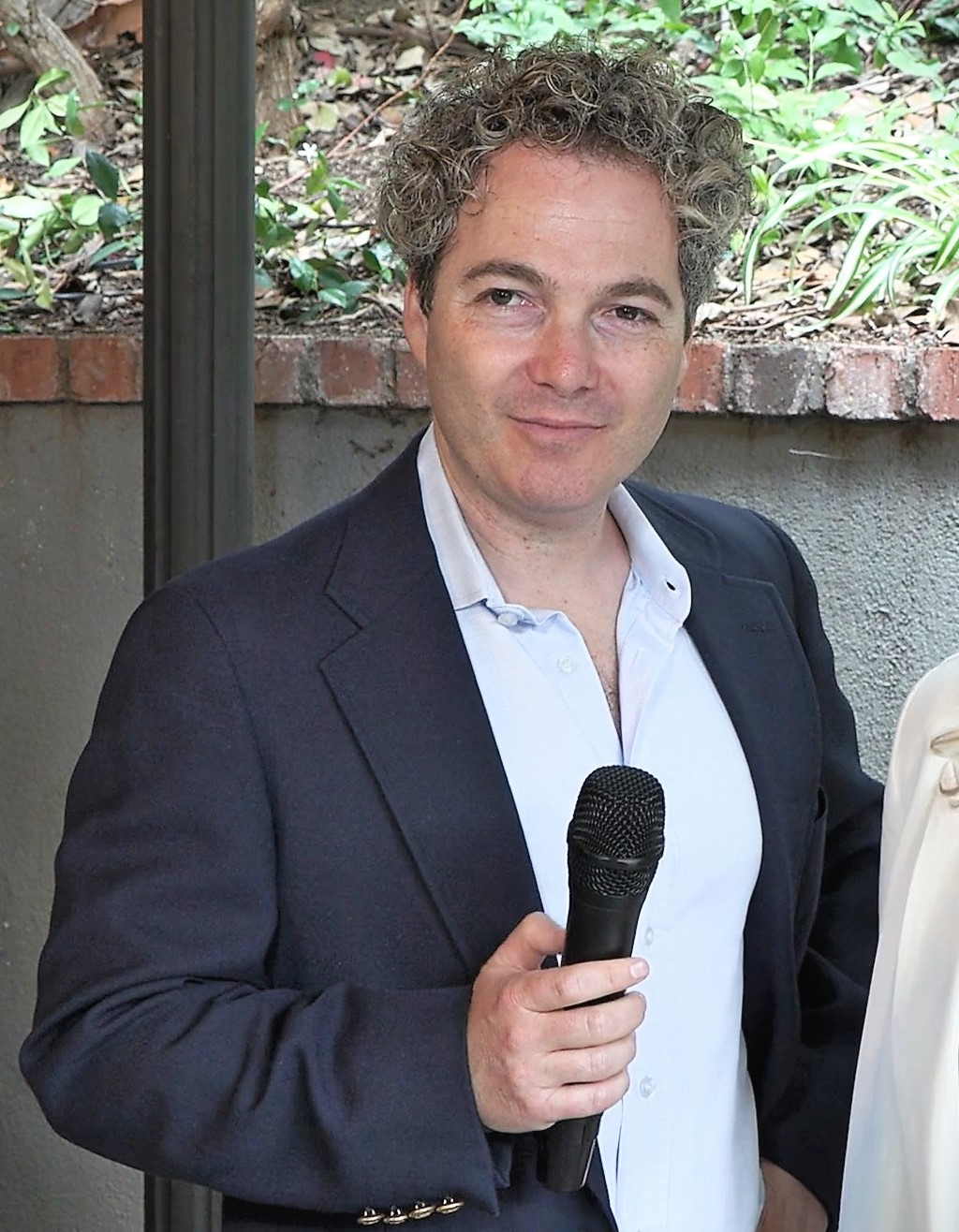
- Shenkarow at Kirk Baily's celebration of life in 2022
- Born: October 17, 1980 (age 46)
- Occupations: Actor; producer; director; writer
- Years active: 1986–present

Justin Shenkarow is an American actor, producer, director and writer, best known for his roles of Matthew Brock in Picket Fences, Simon Holmes in Eerie, Indiana, and the voice of Harold Berman from the Nickelodeon animated series, Hey Arnold!.

== Life and career ==
Shenkarow has starred in television and film for over 30 years. He received three Young Artist Award nominations for his work as an actor on Picket Fences. He has starred in television shows including: Eerie, Indiana, Home Improvement, The Fresh Prince of Bel-Air, Strong Medicine, and Boston Public.

Shenkarow's production company, Shake That Fro Productions, has produced three short films in 2006 which he wrote, produced, directed and starred in, Decoy, The Best Christmas Ever and Tears. In 2005 he appeared in two films, House of the Dead 2 and Comedy Hell co-starring Eric Roberts.

In 2004, he was elected to the Screen Actors Board.

== Filmography ==
=== Film ===
Year	Title	Role	Notes
1992	The Opposite Sex and How to Live with Them	Buddy	
2001	Recess: School's Out	Soldier Kid, Gelman	Voice
2002	Hey Arnold!: The Movie	Harold Berman	Voice
2006	Garfield: A Tail of Two Kitties	Additional voices	
2006	Barnyard	Additional voices	
2006	Comedy Hell	Hades	
2009	Fuel	Rick	
2011	The American Dream	Paul	
2016	Max & Me	Keith	Voice
2017	The Star	Additional voices	
2018	Spider-Man: Into the Spider-Verse	Additional voices	
2020	Bad President	Anger	
2021	The Mitchells vs. the Machines	Additional voices	

=== Television ===
Year	Title	Role	Notes
1989	Dad's a Dog	Chip	Television film
1990	Who's the Boss?	Jason	Episode: "Take Me Back to the Ballgame"
1990	A Family for Joe	Pete Brewster Jr.	Television film
1990	The Fresh Prince of Bel-Air	Kevin Driscoll	Episode: "Deck the Halls"
1991	Sons and Daughters	Roy Sanders	2 episodes
1991	ProStars	Tommy	Voice, 13 episodes
1991–1992	Eerie, Indiana	Simon Holmes, Charles Furnell, Self	19 episodes
1992	Batman: The Animated Series	Jordan Hill	Voice, episode: "Be a Clown"
1992	It's Spring Training, Charlie Brown!	Charlie Brown	Voice, television film
1992–1996	Picket Fences	Matthew Brock	88 episodes
1994	The Little Mermaid	Daniel	Voice, episode: "Island of Fear"
1994	Beethoven	Roger	Voice, episode: "The Guard Dog/Mr. Huggs' Wild Ride"
1994–1995	Where on Earth Is Carmen Sandiego?	Player	11 episodes
1994–1998	Life with Louie	Michael Grunewald, additional voices	Voice, 36 episodes
1996	Captain Planet and the Planeteers	Joey	Voice, episode: "101 Mutations"
1996	Gargoyles	Dave Porter	Voice, episode: "Runaways"
1996–2004	Hey Arnold!	Harold Berman, various voices	Voice, 71 episodes
1997	101 Dalmatians: The Series	Patch	Voice, 4 episodes
1997–1999	Recess	Gelman	Voice, 4 episodes
1998	Profiler	Andrew Winslow	Episode: "Dying to Live"
1998	Home Improvement	Matt	Episode: "The Write Stuff"
2001	Boston Public	Warren Dickson	Episode: "Chapter Twenty-Seven"
2001–2004	Lloyd in Space	Eddie Horton	Voice, 39 episodes
2002	Totally Spies!	Adam	Voice, episode: "Silicon Valley Girls"
2003	Strong Medicine	Dusty	Episode: "PMS, Lies and Red Tape"
2004	Kim Possible	Dexter	Voice, episode: "Oh Boyz"
2005	House of the Dead 2	Samuel the Pledge	Television film
2005–2006	W.I.T.C.H.	Eric, Guard	Voice, 5 episodes
2007	Aliens in America	Chaz Palladino	Episode: "Pilot"
2010–2011	Pound Puppies	Freddie, Dragon Mascot, Freckle-Faced Kid	Voice, 2 episodes
2013	Vaughn	Narrator	Voice, television film
2015	Z Nation	Iggy	Episode: "Corporate Retreat"
2016	The Clean	Ethaniel Khalil Lovejoy	Television film
2017	Hey Arnold: The Jungle Movie	Harold Berman	Voice, television film
2021–present	Spidey and His Amazing Friends	Rhino	Voice, recurring role

=== Short films ===
Year	Title	Role	Notes
1994	Hey Arnold: 24 Hours to Live	Harold Berman, Stinky Petersen	Voice
1994	Life with Louie: A Christmas Surprise for Mrs. Stillman	Michael Grunewald	Voice
1995	Izzy's Quest for Olympic Gold	Izzy	Voice
2006	The Best Christmas Ever	Tommy	
2006	Tears	Ducky	
2011	Ice Age: A Mammoth Christmas	Additional voices	
2013	Jose Bond and the Superheroes	Jose Bond	
2018	Silent Struggle	Jeff	
2019	The Magic Socks	Googalou	

=== Video games ===
Year	Title	Role	Notes
2001	Shadow of Destiny	Young Man 1	
2004	Gurumin: A Monstrous Adventure	Peku, Prince	English dub
2006	Lost Planet: Extreme Condition	Rick	
2007	Skate	Additional voices	
2008	Lost Planet: Colonies	Rick	
2011	L.A. Noire	Patrolman James Mitchell	
2011	Ace Combat: Assault Horizon	Shooter 2	English dub
