= Yang Teng-kuei =

Taiwanese businessman

Yang Teng-kuei (Chinese: 楊登魁; 1938–2012) was a Taiwanese businessman with holdings in multiple media ventures.

He operated the Sapphire Grand Cabaret, a concert hall in Kaohsiung, from 1984. It closed in 1991. Yang was active in the East Asian media and entertainment industry, having helped many performers achieve fame, including Chang Fei, Kevin Chu, Brigitte Lin, and Sally Yeh. He was linked to organized crime and imprisoned on Green Island in 1985. In October 1986, Yang and Lo Fu-chu, among others, founded the Tiendaomeng, also known as the Celestial Alliance. Yang was released in 1988 and helped finance Hou Hsiao-hsien's A City of Sadness, only to be jailed again in 1990 on suspicion of gambling. Yang was later freed from Green Island, and in 1992 founded Taiwan's first cable television station. The next year, he funded Jet Li's Fong Sai-yuk. In 1995, Yang was awarded NT$480,000 in compensation for imprisonment without due process during Taiwan's martial law era. He left Taiwan soon after a television station he owned became involved in betting on the Chinese Professional Baseball League. Yang returned in 1997 to establish Gala Television. By the late 1990s, he had become chairman of the Association for Cable Broadcasting Development. Yang's collaboration with Hou Hsiao-hsien continued with the production of Goodbye South, Goodbye in 1996 and Flowers of Shanghai in 1998. He spent the last half of his career in entertainment focused on producing television dramas, such as 2008's Royal Tramp.

In 2004, Yang was a target of blackmail. In 2009, former Yang associate Chu Ke-liang made a successful return to acting after entertainer Yu Tian intervened on Chu's behalf. Yang stated in February 2009 that he would not be "getting in the way" if Chu tried to resume his career. It was later reported that Yang had forgiven 80% of Chu's debt, leaving Chu to pay NT$240 million in total, half of that sum to Yang directly. In 2011, Yang founded Polyface Entertainment Media, a production company, with an estimated investment of $172 million (NT$5 billion). Through Polyface, Yang funded Andrew Lau's 2012 film The Guillotines, released shortly before Yang died of a stroke at Taipei Veterans General Hospital on 31 December 2012, aged 74.

His son is Yang Chung-hsien.
