= Twenty Something (1994 film) =

1994 Hong Kong film by Teddy Chan

- DVD cover
- Traditional Chinese: 晚九朝五
- Simplified Chinese: 晚九朝五
- Hanyu Pinyin: Wǎn Jiǔ Jiāo Wú
- Jyutping: Maan5 Gau2 Ziu1 Ng5
- Directed by: Teddy Chan
- Written by: James Yuen
- Produced by: Peter Chan
- Starring: Jordan Chan; Valerie Chow; Moses Chan; Karsin Bak
- Cinematography: Kwan Pak Suen; Herman Yau
- Edited by: Cheung Ka Fai
- Music by: Wong Wai Nin; Clarence Hui
- Production company: United Filmmakers Organisation (UFO)
- Release date: 8 April 1994
- Running time: 98 minutes
- Country: Hong Kong
- Language: Cantonese
- Box office: HK $10,468,360

Twenty Something (Chinese: 晚九朝五) is a 1994 Hong Kong film directed by Teddy Chan Tak-Sum (陳德森). It is the sole Category III film in UFO's (United Filmmakers Organization) list of credits. Jordan Chan won Best Supporting Actor at the 14th Hong Kong Film Awards for his role in the film.

== Cast ==
- Jordan Chan – Bo
- Valerie Chow – Alice
- Moses Chan – Tom
- Karsin Bak – Pat
- Farini Cheung – Jennifer
- Selena Khoo – Sue
