= Bridge of Dragons =

- Promotional release poster
- Directed by: Isaac Florentine
- Written by: Carlton Holder
- Produced by: Yoram Barzilai; Boaz Davidson; Danny Lerner
- Starring: Dolph Lundgren
- Cinematography: Yossi Wein
- Edited by: Irit Raz
- Music by: Stephen Edwards
- Distributed by: Nu Image Films
- Release dates: June 30, 1999 (Argentina); July 8, 1999 (Italy); October 9, 1999 (United Kingdom); October 13, 1999 (United States); November 26, 1999 (Japan)
- Running time: 92 minutes
- Country: United States
- Language: English
- Budget: $3-4 million

Bridge of Dragons (stylized as A Bridge of Dragons) is a 1999 American romantic action film directed by Isaac Florentine, and starring Dolph Lundgren, Cary-Hiroyuki Tagawa, Valerie Chow, and Gary Hudson. It was the first film by Nu Image to be shot in Bulgaria.

== Plot ==
Mercenary Warchild works for the man who raised him and trained him, General Ruechang. The general is planning to marry Princess Halo and take over the country. Halo finds out that Ruechang killed her father and runs away. Warchild has to bring her back to Ruechang. However, Warchild and Halo falls in love and take on Ruechang's forces.

== Cast ==
- Dolph Lundgren as Warchild
- Cary-Hiroyuki Tagawa as General Ruechang
- Valerie Chow as Princess Halo (credited as Rachel Shane)
- Gary Hudson as Emmerich
- John Bennett as The Registrar
- Scott L. Schwartz as Belmont
- Jo Kendall as Lily
- Dave Nichols as York
- Bashar Rahal as Robert
- Velizar Binev as The Tailor
- Ivan Istatkov as Arena Ring Master
- Nikolay Binev as The Doctor
- Boyan Milushev as Jake
- Sevdelin Ivanov as Scott
- Brian Fitkin as Renegade Leader
