= Nickelodeon Kart Racers 3: Slime Speedway =

2022 video game

- Cover art featuring (clockwise from top) Aang, Raphael, Jenny, SpongeBob, and Garfield racing through Jelly Meadows
- Developer: Bamtang Games
- Publisher: GameMill Entertainment (Note: Maximum Games distributes physical copies in Europe.)
- Director: Adam Johnston
- Producers: Jennifer Semeler; Alison Portocarrero
- Designers: Axel Muñoz; Claudio Sarmiento; Mauricio Morales
- Programmers: Edward Nancay; Jesús Blas; Carlos Madrazo
- Artists: Ivan Olarte; Giovanni Puppo; Nyall Martel
- Composers: Carlos Bozzo; Diego Villafuerte
- Series: Nicktoons
- Engine: Unreal Engine 4
- Platforms: Nintendo Switch; PlayStation 4; PlayStation 5; Windows; Xbox One; Xbox Series X/S
- Release: WW: October 14, 2022
- Genre: Racing
- Modes: Single-player, multiplayer

Nickelodeon Kart Racers 3: Slime Speedway is a racing game developed by Bamtang Games and published by GameMill Entertainment. It is the third entry in the Nickelodeon Kart Racers series, following Nickelodeon Kart Racers (2018) and Nickelodeon Kart Racers 2: Grand Prix (2020). Like its predecessors, Slime Speedway is based around characters from various Nickelodeon animated series, known as "Nicktoons", participating in kart races and attempting to defeat their opponents. The game was released on October 14, 2022 for Nintendo Switch, PlayStation 4, PlayStation 5, Windows, Xbox One, and Xbox Series X/S.

== Gameplay ==
Nickelodeon Kart Racers 3: Slime Speedway builds on the gameplay established in previous series entries. Players must race around a track and attempt to come in first place, using items scattered on the track to hinder opponents or techniques such as drifting and midair tricks to gain speed. As in the original Nickelodeon Kart Racers, vehicles will transform into watercraft at predetermined points in the race to continue progressing through the track. The "pit crew" system from Nickelodeon Kart Racers 2: Grand Prix returns, which allows players to equip special characters before each race that grant them active and passive abilities. These abilities can be activated once the player fills a meter by driving through a sufficient amount of slime on the track. Up to 90 pit crew characters can be unlocked in Slime Speedway. All of the core gameplay modes from the previous game return, including the "Slime Scramble" Grand Prix; Free Race; Time Trial; Challenges; and Arena.

Slime Speedway includes a base roster of 40 playable racers from various Nicktoons, with two additional characters available as downloadable content. Character karts can be customized using a variety of different parts, each of which affects the kart's gameplay statistics such as speed or handling. While each kart body was tied to a specific character in the previous games, Slime Speedway allows any character to use any kart body. In addition to karts, characters can now ride bikes as well. The game features 36 race tracks, 16 of which return from the previous game. New racers, pit crew and vehicle parts can be unlocked by winning cups in Slime Scramble, completing challenges, or purchasing them with slime tokens at the in-game garage. Slime Speedway supports both four-player local split-screen multiplayer and online multiplayer for up to 12 players.

=== Playable characters ===
- Aang (Avatar: The Last Airbender)
- April O'Neil (Teenage Mutant Ninja Turtles)
- Arnold Shortman (Hey Arnold!)
- CatDog (CatDog)
- Chuckie Finster (Rugrats)
- Cindy Vortex (Jimmy Neutron)
- Clyde McBride (The Loud House)
- Danny Phantom (Danny Phantom)
- Donatello (Teenage Mutant Ninja Turtles)
- Eastman and Laird Raphael (Note: Downloadable content) (Teenage Mutant Ninja Turtles)
- Garfield (Garfield)
- Gerald Johanssen (Hey Arnold!)
- GIR (Invader Zim)
- Helga Pataki (Hey Arnold!)
- Jenny Wakeman (My Life as a Teenage Robot)
- Jimmy Neutron (Jimmy Neutron)
- JoJo Siwa (The JoJo and BowBow Show Show)
- Kamper Patrick (Kamp Koral: SpongeBob's Under Years)
- Kamper SpongeBob (Kamp Koral: SpongeBob's Under Years)
- Korra (The Legend of Korra)
- Leonardo (Teenage Mutant Ninja Turtles)
- Lincoln Loud (The Loud House)
- Lucy Loud (The Loud House)
- Michelangelo (Teenage Mutant Ninja Turtles)
- Oblina (Aaahh!!! Real Monsters)
- Odie (Garfield)
- Patrick Star (SpongeBob SquarePants)
- Powdered Toast Man (The Ren & Stimpy Show)
- Prince Zuko (Avatar: The Last Airbender)
- Purple Reptar (Rugrats)
- Raphael (Teenage Mutant Ninja Turtles)
- Ren (The Ren & Stimpy Show)
- Reptar (Rugrats)
- Rocko (Rocko's Modern Life)
- Sandy Cheeks (SpongeBob SquarePants)
- SpongeBob SquarePants (SpongeBob SquarePants)
- Squidina Star (The Patrick Star Show)
- Squidward Tentacles (SpongeBob SquarePants)
- Susie Carmichael (Rugrats)
- Stimpy (The Ren & Stimpy Show)
- Toph Beifong (Avatar: The Last Airbender)
- Zim (Invader Zim)

== Development ==
Nickelodeon Kart Racers 3: Slime Speedway was initially leaked by Best Buy on July 8, 2022, before being formally announced later that day. A trailer for the game was released on September 12, 2022. Unlike previous Nickelodeon Kart Racers games, Slime Speedway features full English voice acting for all of the game's characters, excluding JoJo Siwa. Slime Speedway marked Janet Varney's final performance as Korra, choosing to retire from the role shortly thereafter to allow an actress of color to take her place.

The game was originally announced to be released on October 7, 2022, but was later delayed one week to October 14. Players can also purchase the "Turbo Pack" downloadable content separately or packaged with the "Turbo Edition" of the game. The pack includes two additional playable characters, Zuko and "Eastman & Laird" Raphael, along with additional crew characters and vehicle parts.

== Reception ==
Reception

Aggregate score
Aggregator	Score
Metacritic	(PS5) 70/100 (XSXS) 68/100 (NS) 64/100

Review scores
Publication	Score
Nintendo Life	5/10
Shacknews	6/10

Nickelodeon Kart Racers 3: Slime Speedway received "mixed or average" reviews according to review aggregator website Metacritic. Shacknews appreciated the number of characters, tracks and modes, but ultimately called it "as average of a kart racer as it gets." Nintendo Life praised the character roster, customization and addition of voice acting, but heavily criticized the performance of the Switch version, saying that it runs "with a severely reduced frame rate compared to its predecessor, making everything feel more sluggish as a result."
