= Arnold's Christmas =

- Hey Arnold! episode
- Episode no.: Season 1 Episode 18
- Directed by: Stark Howell; Steve Socki; Tuck Tucker
- Written by: Joe Ansolabehere; Craig Bartlett; Steve Viksten
- Production codes: 020A; 020B
- Original air date: December 11, 1996
- Running time: 25 minutes

Guest appearances
- Hiep Thi Le as Mai Hyunh; Vincent Schiavelli as Mr. Bailey

Episode chronology
← Previous "24 Hours to Live"	Next → "False Alarm"

"Arnold's Christmas" is the eighteenth episode of the first season of the American animated television series Hey Arnold! A Christmas episode, it first aired on Nickelodeon in the United States on December 11, 1996. The plot revolves around Arnold's efforts to find Mr. Hyunh's daughter, who was separated from him during the Vietnam War, in his role as Mr. Hyunh's secret Santa. The episode is considered one of the show's most memorable because of its subject matter. It is often included in lists of TV's best Christmas or holiday episodes.

== Plot ==
For the secret Santa gift exchange at the Sunset Arms boarding house, Arnold (Toran Caudell) draws Mr. Hyunh's (Baoan Coleman) name. Arnold wants to get him something special as he notices Mr. Hyunh always seems sadder during the Christmas season, but realizes that he does not know Mr. Hyunh very well. Arnold pays him a visit and Mr. Hyunh recounts the story of how he came to Hillwood. Mr. Hyunh lived in Vietnam during the Vietnam War. During the Fall of Saigon, limited transport forced him to give up his infant daughter Mai (Hiep Thi Le) to American soldiers so she can live a better, safer life in the United States. It was not until twenty years later that Mr. Hyunh was able to leave Vietnam to come to the United States as a refugee to search for his long-lost daughter in Hillwood, the city where the departing soldier said she'd be taken to. However, Mr. Hyunh has yet to be successful in locating his daughter and despairs over it. Arnold immediately decides that the best Christmas present possible is to find Mai.

Arnold enlists the help of his best friend Gerald (Jamil Walker Smith) to help locate Mai. They only have one day, as it is already Christmas Eve. Approaching an overworked public records employee to help them track her down, the three eventually reach a deal where Arnold and Gerald would do the city employee's unfinished Christmas shopping in exchange for this favor. However, the pair are unable to find the last item on the city employee's shopping list: a highly in-demand pair of brand label snow boots. Arnold gives up in despair, as the city employee won't do them their favor without the shopping list fully checked off. Meanwhile, Helga (Francesca Marie Smith), who had been stalking Arnold as usual, had already received a pair of said snow boots from her parents as a Christmas present, presumably the last pair available in the entire city. She spends a few hours torn between giving up her boots to help Arnold in his quest, or keeping the boots for herself, as they are a rare sign of love from her usually neglectful parents. She ultimately goes directly to the city employee just as the latter is leaving the office and convinces him to track down Mai, giving him her snow boots. Hyunh and Mai are soon reunited just in time for Christmas. While Mr. Hyunh is overjoyed, Arnold is shocked that the reunion happened in time, but Gerald just tells Arnold to accept it as a Christmas miracle and suggests that Arnold has a Christmas angel looking out for him. Helga, standing outside the building in her socks after having led Mai there, is listening to the reunion take place and simply whispers, "Merry Christmas, Arnold".

== Production ==
Steve Viksten came up with the idea of exploring Mr. Hyunh's backstory and got the approval from show creator Craig Bartlett. He then pitched the idea to Mr. Hyunh's voice actor Baoan Coleman. Coleman, a Vietnamese refugee, responded by saying "I was there". However, getting the episode approved for the network proved difficult. Network executives objected to the "heavy" subject matter as well as the depiction of a specific war, and rejected the episode when it was only halfway complete in production. However, an executive at Nickelodeon brought it home and showed it to her son. The boy's reaction after watching Mr. Hyunh's story of his separation from Mai prompted the executive to approve the episode.

Due to the episode's sensitive nature, the producers worked closely with Coleman to ensure its faithfulness to the historical events depicted. Being a children's show, the Vietnam War was never mentioned by name, but the team was committed to alluding to it in a "poetic" way, through a sequence complete with dramatic guitar by series composer Jim Lang. Lang cited this episode among his favorites to score for. To ensure that Mr. Hyunh's character speaks with an authentic accent, during the recording process Bartlett would rewrite any lines that Coleman felt were difficult or seemed uncomfortable for him to say.

== Reception ==
"Arnold's Christmas" premiered on Nickelodeon on December 11, 1996. It was released to home video on VHS a year later. Hartford Courant's review of the episode wrote that although the message of "greedy people learn[ing] the true spirit of Christmas from someone less fortunate" was cliché, the episode "uses an interesting historical twist to make the story fresh, and touching", while also teaching children aspects of the Vietnam War "seemingly incongruously".

"Arnold's Christmas" is considered a memorable and groundbreaking episode in children's television. Commentators note that it is among the first instances in American television where the Vietnamese perspective of the Vietnam War is explored. Many Asian Americans who grew up in the 1990s, including Vietnamese Americans, recall it being one of the few times where their history was represented in pop culture and cite it as a source of inspiration. They appreciated Mr. Hyunh's ability to tell his own story, in an authentic accent. Due to the lack of social media when the episode aired, the show's creators did not know about the episode's impact on Asian American viewers until many of them grew up and talked about its impact on them.

The episode is often included in lists of TV's best holiday episodes, including Variety's, Screen Rant's, IndieWire's, and Den of Geek's. It is also a fan favorite, ranking first in IMDb's user ratings of all Hey Arnold! episodes as well as all holiday episodes on Nickelodeon, third in all Christmas episodes, ninth in CBR's list of the show's saddest episodes, as well as first in the site's list of saddest moments in Nickelodeon cartoons.
