= Reptar =

Fictional character from the Rugrats cartoon

- Rugrats character
- First appearance: "At the Movies" (1991)
- Created by: Craig Bartlett; Paul Germain; Arlene Klasky; Gábor Csupó
- Voiced by: John Schuck (as Leo); Busta Rhymes (Reptar Wagon; only in The Rugrats Movie); Fred Tatasciore (2021-present)

In-universe information
- Species: Mutated Tyrannosaurus Kaiju

Reptar is a fictional character from the American animated television series Rugrats. He is a green Tyrannosaurus-like kaiju (and sometimes appears in red-violet and lilac) with rounded and blue spike-like appendages on its back, which intentionally causes it to resemble and spoof Godzilla. Outside of Rugrats-related films, Reptar appears as a playable character in the Nickelodeon Kart Racers and Nickelodeon All-Star Brawl video game series.

== Character concept and depiction ==
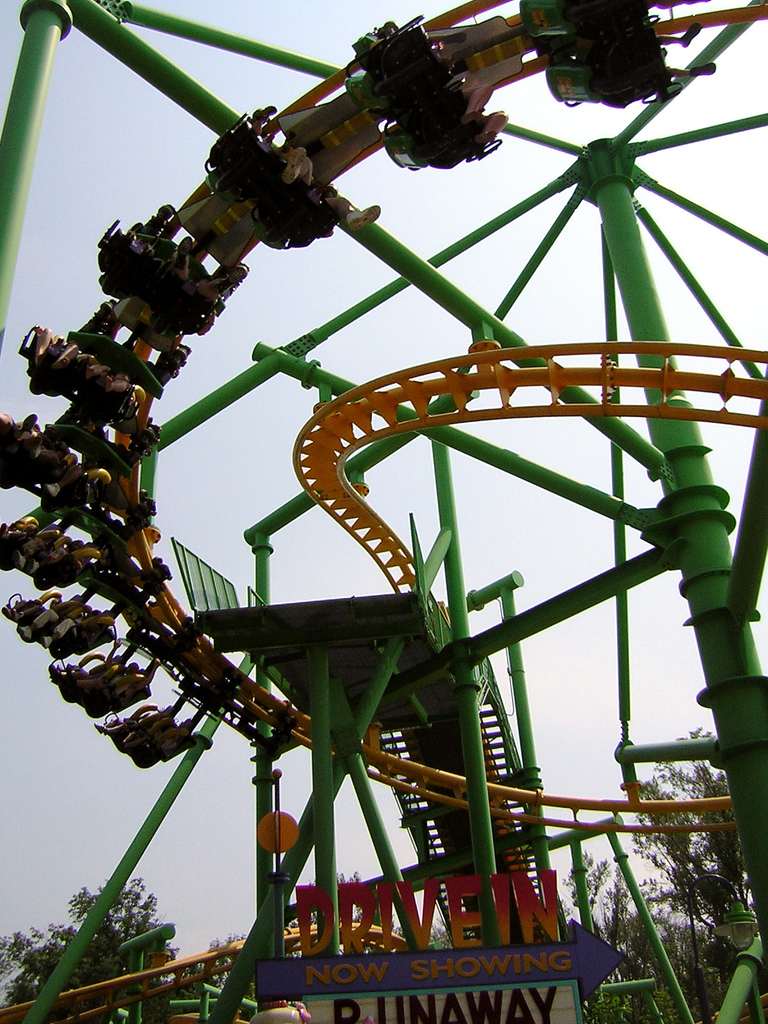
Flying Ace Aerial Chase at Kings Island, which was originally named and themed after the Rugrats two-part episode "Runaway Reptar".

Reptar is portrayed as being a fictional character in the Rugrats universe idolized by a majority of the children featured in the series, particularly Tommy Pickles and his friends. A gigantic green and Tyrannosaurus-like kaiju, Reptar's popularity as a character is noticeably akin to that of Mickey Mouse, although his role is similar to Godzilla. When it appeared in Rugrats related films, it prominently showed a Japanese theme park that was depicting Reptar. This popularity is seen in the merchandise spawned from his character and owned by the babies as seen in the program. The Reptar character has since been used in real-world merchandise branding, such as an amusement park ride, chocolate bar, Funko Pop, and an ice show (as featured in the episode "Reptar on Ice").

== In the TV series ==
In the 2021 series, Reptar stars in a new series called "Reptar in Space", which depicts him being stranded on the Moon after his spaceship blows up after a long journey through space, now he has to protect Earth from alien invaders and find a way back home.

== In the Rugrats films ==
Reptar appeared in The Rugrats Movie film as a wagon invented by Tommy's father Stu Pickles. The Reptar Wagon was no ordinary wagon as it is made like a high-tech car that can do various things such as talk and turn into a boat (Aqua Reptar) when in water and has fire breath. The Rugrats took it along with them on a journey to the "hopsical" to return Tommy's newborn brother Dil, but they wind up getting lost in the forest. In this appearance, the Reptar Wagon is voiced by Levi Curl and rapper Busta Rhymes of Flipmode Squad.

Reptar had a more important role as a giant robot in Rugrats in Paris, when Stu once again built a robotic likeness of the character. The robot's head fell off twice in the film, although Stu fixed it the first time for the play. The Rugrats also took it to the church to stop the wedding of Chuckie’s father Chas and villain Coco LaBouche who hates children.

The Reptar Wagon is seen in the background in Rugrats Go Wild near the beginning of the film in the Pickles' backyard. Unlike in the previous films, neither Reptar nor the wagon has any relevance to the plot.

The Reptar Wagon appeared in several episodes of Rugrats following the release of The Rugrats Movie once again voiced by Busta Rhymes through archive recordings from the film. The Reptar Wagon is rarely seen in the later episodes.

=== Other appearances ===
Outside of the Rugrats film, a normal-sized Reptar appeared as playable racer in 2018's Nickelodeon Kart Racers, and its sequels Nickelodeon Kart Racers 2: Grand Prix and Nickelodeon Kart Racers 3: Slime Speedway; the latter game features a purple Reptar as an unlockable character.

A normal-sized Reptar also appears as a playable character in Nickelodeon All-Star Brawl and its sequel, with Fred Tatasciore reprising his role from the 2021 series.

== Reception ==
Overall, critics and fans have generally praised Reptar. Destructoid names Reptar as one of the "childhood favorites" featured in Nickelodeon Kart Racers. While Shacknews described Reptar as one of the most popular characters in the Rugrats universe, and further stated that "Still, a dinosaur is badass and he's a great choice to stomp all over the competition at Nickelodeon All-Star Brawl," Complex included Reptar's Wagon on their "Coolest Fictional Cars", and stated that "With extendable arms, a Busta Rhymes Reptar voice, and fire-spitting nostrils (on the original model), this is one badass baby ride." Zimbio ranked Reptar as 7th of the best pop-culture dinosaur, and stated that "At first glance, Reptar might seem like a spoof on Godzilla, but this uniquely weird dinosaur is truly an unforgettable character. From having his own cereal and chocolate bar to dancing on ice, Reptar is like Beyonce to Tommy, Chuckie, Phil, and Lil." Reptar was also included at Alternative Press on their "most metal cartoon characters", by stating that "This fire-breathing beast is loved and admired in playpens far and wide for his badass heroics throughout the Rugrats series and movies."
