= Karsin Bak =

Hong Kong singer and film actress

- Born: Hong Kong
- Occupations: Actress; singer
- Years active: 1986–2001

Chinese name
- Traditional Chinese: 白嘉倩
- Simplified Chinese: 白嘉倩
Transcriptions
Standard Mandarin
- Hanyu Pinyin: Bái Jiā Qiàn
- Musical career
- Also known as: Karsin Berthel, Bak Kar-Sin, Eve Berthel
- Formerly of: Borderline; Purple Heart

Karsin Bak a.k.a. Karsin Berthel is a Hong Kong singer and film actress of Chinese and German descent, most active around the mid-1980s to 1990s.

Bak originally debuted as the lead singer of the band Borderline (邊界樂隊), which won first place at the 1986 Hong Kong Carlsberg Pop Music Festival. Borderline recorded two LPs before disbanding, with Bak going onto form the band Purple Heart and eventually launching a solo career in 1993. As a solo artist, she collaborated with Sandy Lam on "I Don't Hate No One" (我沒有恨誰), which was a Cantonese cover version of Wilson Phillips' 1992 single, "You Won't See Me Cry."

As an actress, she has appeared in 14 films since 1990, most notably in Teddy Chan's 1994 Category-III film, Twentysomething.

== Early life ==
Bak studied Fashion Design at the Hong Kong Polytechnic Institute.

== Discography ==
=== Borderline ===
- 1987: Borderline (發條愛情)
- 1989: Going Underground (地下旅程) [*Promo Only, Commercially Unreleased]

=== Purple Heart ===
- 1991: Beyond Borderline (超越邊界)

=== Solo ===
- November 1993: I Have Myself (我有我)

== Filmography ==
- Look Out, Officer! (1990)
- Twentysomething (1994)
- In the Heat of Summer (1994)
- Only Fools Fall in Love (1995)
- Hong Kong Graffiti (1995)
- Happy Hour (1995)
- Heaven Can't Wait (1995)
- Those Were the Days (1996)
- Troublesome Night (1997)
- 97' Lan Kwai Fong (1997)
- Expect the Unexpected (1998)
- Moonlight Express (1999)
- The Kid (1999)
- Everyday Is Valentine (2001)
