= Yang Chung-hsien =

Taiwanese singer and actor

Yang Chung-hsien (Chinese: 楊宗憲; 25 August 1969) is a Taiwanese actor and singer who won a Golden Melody Award in 1992.

== Early life ==
In August 1969, Yang was born. Yang's father is Yang Tang-kuei.
