= Bugis Street (film) =

1995 Hong Kong-Singaporean film by Yonfan

- Film poster
- Directed by: Yonfan
- Written by: Fruit Chan; Yuo Chan; Yonfan
- Starring: Michael Lam Wai-Leung; Hiep Thi Le
- Cinematography: Jacky Tang
- Edited by: Ma Kam
- Production company: Jaytex Productions
- Distributed by: Margin Films (USA)
- Release dates: 13 April 1995 (Hong Kong & Singapore)
- Running time: 100 minutes
- Countries: Hong Kong; Singapore
- Languages: English; Mandarin

Bugis Street (妖街皇后) (Mandarin name: Yāo Jiē Huánghòu) is a 1995 film directed by Yonfan, about the lives of Singaporean transvestites in a bygone era. A Hong Kong-Singaporean co-production, it was a minor hit at the box office with a sexually-explicit R(A) (in short as Restricted (Artistic)) rating, owing to male full-frontal nudity and its nostalgic evocation of a seedy but colourful aspect of Singaporean culture, prior to the redevelopment of Bugis Street into a modern shopping district and the eradication of transvestite activities in the area.

In 2015, the restored version of the film was presented at the 26th Singapore International Film Festival as Bugis Street Redux.

== Synopsis ==
Sixteen-year-old Lien, portrayed by Vietnamese actress Hiep Thi Le, is the main protagonist. Despite having worked for a time as a servant in a household whose "young master" adored her in her hometown of Malacca in West Malaysia, the young girl comes across as having led a surprisingly sheltered life. She journeys to Singapore to seek employment as a maid in the Sin Sin Hotel along Bugis Street.

For a time, she seems content with possessing an idealized view of the activities at the hotel where she witnesses "the departure of an American gentleman" from the workplace of "his Chinese girl". The guest is actually a presently sober but American sailor who has belatedly discovered that the Singaporean Chinese prostitute he picked up in Bugis Street and spent a night with is a trans woman. Before long, the new employee Lien finds out that many of the long-term lodgers of the budget establishment, whose room rental rate is S$3, whether it be for an hour or the entire day and night, are trans women.

Although her first reaction to seeing someone with breasts and a penis is one of revulsion which causes her to contemplate fleeing the neighbourhood, she instead listens to and heeds the cajoling and advice of Lola, the trans hotel resident who has treated her well from the start of her stint. She comes to accept the unique, complex personalities of the unorthodox community, who in turn also begin to accept her. As she learns to look beyond the surface, she is rewarded with the generous friendship of the cosmopolitan and sophisticated Drago, who has returned from Paris to minister to his/her dying but loving and tolerant mother.

While Lien learns the ways of the world via her encounters with Meng, the slimy, often underdressed boyfriend of Lola, as well as night-time escapades on the town with the Sin Sin Hotel's other denizens, she begins to see beauty in unlikely places and to grow despite the presence of ugliness in an imperfect world.

== Cast ==
- Hiep Thi Le as Lien
- Michael Lam as Meng
- Greg-O as Drago
- Ernest Seah as Lola
- David Knight as Sailor
- Maggie Lye as Maggie
- Gerald Chen as Mrs. Hwee
- Maria Jaafar as Zsa Zsa
- Sofia as Sophie
- Linden as Linda
- Lily Siew Lin Ong as Drago's Mother (as Lily Ong)
- Matthew Foo as Dr. Toh
- Benedict Goh as Sing (Schoolboy)
- Gerald Chen as Mrs. Hwee
- Matthew Foo as Dr. Toh
- Godfrey Yew as Mr. Wong
- Charles as Wah Chai
- Kelvin Lua as Drago's Boyfriend
- Tyosaurus Club as Male Joggers
- Sharon Chua as Sister One
- Jimmy Newton-Lim as Sister Two
- Anthony Yeo as Sister From Bangkok
- Anuar as Sister From Africa
- Sim Wen Chiat as 少爷 (Young master)

== See also ==
- List of lesbian, gay, bisexual or transgender-related films (sorted alphabetically)
- List of lesbian, gay, bisexual, or transgender-related films by storyline
- Nudity in film (East Asian cinema since 1929)
