= Michael Lam =

Hong Kong former actor and Buddhist monk

Michael Lam Wai-Leung (Chinese: 林偉亮; pinyin: Lín Wěiliàng) is a former Hong Kong film actor. He has appeared in numerous films, in several of which he has played the lead role. He first appeared in the film The Night Rider.

Lam took his first lead role in the Hong Kong-Singaporean film Bugis Street, made in 1995 and directed by award-winning director Yonfan, where he played the role of Meng.

Lam ordained as a Buddhist monk in 2009, and currently a resident monk in Tsz Shan Monastery.

== Filmography ==
- The Night Rider (1992)
- From Zero to Hero (1994)
- He & She (1994) ... Michael, one of Kai's boyfriends
- In the Heat of Summer (1994) ... gangster
- Crystal Fortune Run (1994) ... Hot Dog
- Organized Crime & Triad Bureau (1994) ... OCTB member
- Let's Go Slam Dunk (1994) ... King Kong
- The Final Option (1994) ... Ching
- Fait Accompli (1994) ... Chun Ming
- Touches of Love (1994)
- Ten Brothers (1995) ... Rubber Four / Snake Skinned Four
- Bugis Street (1995)
- Highway Man (1995)
- Thanks for Your Love (1996) ... [cameo] gay-lo on the street
- Ah Kam (1996) ... Scarface
- War of the Under World (1996) ... Lei Jia Bao
- Sexy and Dangerous (1996) ... Lurcher's man
- Those Were the Days (1996) ... Norman
- All's Well, End's Well '97 (1997) ... Muscle
- The Hunted Hunter (1997) ... Shek Chue
- Love Cruise (1997) ... Leon
- Young and Dangerous 4 (1997) ... Dinosaur
- The Love and Sex of the Eastern Hollywood (1998) ... Mike/Patrick
- A Hero Never Dies (1998) ... Bodyguard
- The Group (1998)
- Casino (1998) ... Tai Hung
- Magnificent Team (1998) ... Two Stroke
- Bishonen (1998) ... Sex-buyer
- Hong Kong Night Club (1998) ... Black Hand's thug
- Untouchable Maniac (2000) ... Nick
- The Blood Rules (2000) ... Cocky customer at car showroom
- Women From Mars (2002) ... Chu Da Tou
- Dragon Loaded 2003 (2003) ... "Swimming" demonstrator
- Super Model (2004) ... model at disco
- Undercover (2007)
