= Black Dream =

Studio album by Dou Wei
- Released: October 1994
- Genre: Alternative rock, post-punk
- Label: Magic Stone Records

Dou Wei chronology
Black Dream (1994)	Sunny Days (1995)

Black Dream (Chinese: 黑梦; pinyin: Hēi Mèng) is the debut Solo Album by Chinese artist Dou Wei, released in October 1994 on Magic Stone Records. It is considered to be a landmark album among the Chinese rock scene.

Drawing heavily from goth rock acts such as Bauhaus and The Cure, as well as dub and reggae, Black Dream stood in direct contrast to the traditional guitar-oriented styles which had defined Chinese rock up to that point. The album's haunting production, coupled with Dou's stream-of-conscious vocal delivery, established it as China's first alternative album.

The album has been ranked among Taiwan's best 1990s pop albums.

== Background ==
After leaving seminal Chinese hard rock band Black Panther in October 1991. Dou immediately established the band Dreaming (Chinese: 做梦乐队; pinyin: Zuòmèng yuèduì). Many of the tracks on Black Dream were written during this period. Dreaming released one song, "希望之光" (pinyin: Xīwàng Zhī Guāng; "Light of Hope") before disbanding in October 1992.

== Track listing ==
All lyrics are written by Dou Wei; all music is composed by Dou Wei and Dreaming, unless noted

Standard listing
No.	Title	Music	Unofficial translation	Length
1.	"Míngtiān gèng màncháng 明天更漫长"		"Longer Tomorrow"	4:32
2.	"Hēisè mèng zhōng 黑色梦中"	Dou Wei, Bai Fanglin	"Black Dream"	4:43
3.	"Hái yǒu nǐ 还有你"	Dou Wei, Chen Xiaohu	"And You…"	5:54
4.	"Kāixīn diànhuà開心電话"		"Darling's Phone"	3:57
5.	"Cóngmìng 从命"	Dou Wei, Bang Fanglin	"Predestined"	4:37
6.	"Gǎnjué shíkè 感觉时刻"		"Time of Sensuality"	3:50
7.	"Bēishāng de mèng 悲傷的夢"		"A Dream of Misery"	6:08
8.	"Ō! Guāi 噢！乖"		"Be Good, Boy"	5:14
9.	"Gāojí dòngwù 高級動物"	Dou Wei, Bai Fanglin	"The Higher Being"	4:40
10.	"Shàngdì bǎoyòu 上帝保佑"	Dou Wei	"God Bless Me"	3:46

== Personnel ==
Personnel as listed in the album's liner notes are:

=== Musicians ===
- Dou Wei – vocals, guitar, drums
- Cao Jun – guitar
- Hu Xiaohai – bass
- Zhao Muyang – drums
- Bai Fanglin – keyboards
- Liu Xiaosong – percussion (track 9)

=== Production ===
- Zhang Peiren – executive producer
- Jia Minshu – producer, recording
- Jin Shaogang – recording
- Yan Zhongkun – mixing; mastering
- Xu Chongxian – mastering
