= Valerie Chow =

Hong Kong actress, fashion publicist and entrepreneur

- Born: Valerie Chow Kar-Ling; 16 December 1970 (age 55); Vancouver, British Columbia, Canada
- Years active: 1991–2004, 2018
- Spouse: Darryl Goveas (m. 2005)
- Children: 1 daughter

Chinese name
- Traditional Chinese: 周嘉玲
- Simplified Chinese: 周嘉玲
Transcriptions
Standard Mandarin
- Hanyu Pinyin: Zhōu Jiālíng
Yue: Cantonese
- Jyutping: Zau1 Gaa1ling4

Valerie Chow (born 16 December 1970) is a Hong Kong former actress, fashion publicist, and entrepreneur. In English language film and television roles, she was credited as Rachel Shane.

She starred in numerous films and television series, including in Wong Kar-wai's 1994 feature, Chungking Express, for which she was nominated for Best Supporting Actress at the 14th Hong Kong Film Awards. Chow was also a former Miss Hong Kong second runner-up in 1991. She is also the first Chinese model to be signed by US cosmetics company Revlon in 1998.

Since 2003, she has worked primarily as a fashion publicist and in 2010, opened Mama Kid, a children's designer concept store in Hong Kong.

In 2018, she made a return to acting, starring in the film Prison Architect by Chinese visual artist Cao Fei. The film was commissioned by Tai Kwun, the Centre for Heritage and Arts in Hong Kong, and screened at the 69th Berlin International Film Festival as part of their Forum Expanded programme. The movie was well received. Many described the film as "very heartfelt and beautiful".

== Life and career ==
=== 1970-93: Early life and Miss Hong Kong Pageant ===
Chow was born and raised in Vancouver, British Columbia, Canada, as the only child of an upper-middle-class family. Her father was a property developer whom she describes as "tough, direct, and self-disciplined." Chow spent some of her teens in Hong Kong during the mid‑1980s where she attended Marymount Secondary School and completed Form 5. She described these years as having been "difficult" and "stressful," and had initially returned to Vancouver before moving to Hong Kong a second time in the summer of 1991. It was then that she joined the 1991 Miss Hong Kong Pageant, in which she placed first runner-up and made her entry into the entertainment industry. Following a brief study break where she studied law at the University of Hong Kong, Chow began her career in late 1992 as a television presenter for the lifestyle programme, Eye on Hong Kong on TVB Pearl. Her first film credit was a cameo in Peter Chan's He Ain't Heavy, He's My Father, released in December 1993.

=== 1994-97: Hong Kong films ===
As a newcomer, she drew considerable controversy for her role in the Category III box office hit Twenty Something, which dealt with sexually explicit themes considered shocking for a former Miss Hong Kong beauty queen. Her following role in Wong Kar-wai's widely acclaimed Chungking Express also made an impression and garnered her a Hong Kong Film Award nomination for Best Supporting Actress. Her career took a sharp turn when she played the role of a "homewrecker" in a hugely popular television series. The role was ill-received and the image of seductress came to be closely associated with Chow, perhaps further fuelled by earlier rumours of her alleged affair with Tony Leung Chiu Wai (then already dating long-time partner Carina Lau), whose music videos and album cover she also featured in. In the subsequent period between 1995 and 1997, she was cast in a string of B-movies, usually in the role of a villain. The more notable of these were that of the female terrorist in Jing Wong's High Risk, a moderately successful box-office hit, and a guest appearance in Tsui Hark's acclaimed wu-xia feature The Blade.

=== 1997–99: Hollywood and Revlon ===
In late 1996, she left the Hong Kong film industry to pursue a career in Hollywood, adopting a more racially ambiguous screen name, Rachel Shane. She was signed to the William Morris Agency and had a small part in the film Phantoms which starred Peter O'Toole and Ben Affleck. More substantially, she became the first Chinese spokesmodel for Revlon US in 1998, appearing in national print and TV ad campaigns alongside Halle Berry, Salma Hayek, and Melanie Griffith. She is to be followed by Lucy Liu.

=== 2000–02: Career transition, part-time actor ===
Chow eventually returned to Hong Kong in 2000, where she joined the media communications department at Lane Crawford, although continued to act part-time. The following year saw her return to the small screen in the ATV series, Healing Hearts, in which she played the role of a lawyer. The role briefly revived her career, leading to several magazine covers and an ad campaign with Neutrogena Hong Kong. She also starred alongside Leslie Cheung in Inner Senses (2002), which was to be Cheung's last film.

=== 2003–present: Fashion publicist, entrepreneur ===
Since 2003, Chow has, for the most part, left the entertainment industry. For the next seven years, she would continue to work as a publicist for the Pedder Group, the shoes and accessories division of Lane Crawford. Looking back on her career in 2010, Chow remarks:

"I worked for the group for 10 years. I rounded off this experience as vice-president, of marketing. I met larger-than-life individuals who left an impression. Highlights included working with [American filmmaker] David Lynch and [footwear designer] Christian Louboutin at Cafe de Flore, in Paris, and producing the first Guy Bourdin exhibition in Hong Kong. I am also proud of the fact that I'm well known in the fashion industry for producing some of the best store window displays in Central. I think more people have seen or admired my window displays than having watched my films."

One of Chow's acting credits is a TV series filmed in mid-2004; however, the series did not air until December 2010, more than six years after filming completed. In September 2010, Chow opened Mama Kid, a children's clothing boutique in Hong Kong's Central District to great success, which has since relocated to Stanley.

Chow married Darryl Goveas, a Hong Kong-based Belgian-Indian interior designer in 2005. Together, the couple have a daughter, Carla Goveas; Carla was born in 2008.

After being promoted to Vice President of Marketing at Lane Crawford, Chow is currently the General Manager of JOYCE.

== Filmography ==
- 1993 He Ain't Heavy, He's My Father (新難兄難弟)
- 1994 Twentysomething (晚九朝五)
- 1994 Chungking Express (重慶森林)
- 1995 Lover of the Last Empress (慈禧秘密生活)
- 1995 Dream Killer (野性的邂逅)
- 1995 The Case of the Cold Fish (月黑風高)
- 1995 Ghostly Bus (鬼巴士)
- 1995 Spider Woman (蜘蛛女)
- 1995 Wind Beneath My Wings (空中小姐)
- 1995 High Risk (鼠膽龍威)
- 1995 The Armed Policewoman (陀槍女警)
- 1995 Red Zone (爆炸令)
- 1995 The Blade (刀)
- 1996 Street Angels (紅燈區)
- 1997 Hero (馬永貞)
- 1998 Phantoms (as Rachel Shane)
- 1998 Futuresport (as Rachel Shane)
- 1999 Bridge of Dragons (as Rachel Shane)
- 2000 Sausalito (一見鍾情)
- 2000 Healing Hearts (俠骨仁心)
- 2001 The Vampire Combat (極速殭屍)
- 2002 Inner Senses (異度空間)
- 2002 Freaky Story (不寒而慄)
- 2018 Prison Architect (監獄建築師)

== TV series ==
- Fate of the Clairvoyant (再見亦是老婆 alt. 都市有情人) (1994)
- ICAC Investigators 1994 (廉政行動1994︰珠芒) (1994) 1 episode
- RTHK's Moments of Love ((香港電台)歲月流情：出浴記之母與女) (1995) 1 episode
- John Woo's Once A Thief (1997) 1 episode (as Rachel Shane)
- Healing Hearts (俠骨仁心) (2001)
- Shanghai Legend (上海灘之俠醫傳奇) (2004, aired 2010)
