= The Blade (film) =

1995 Hong Kong film by Tsui Hark

Chinese name
- Traditional Chinese: 刀
Transcriptions
Standard Mandarin
- Hanyu Pinyin: Dāo
Yue: Cantonese
- Jyutping: Dou^{1}
- Directed by: Tsui Hark
- Written by: Koan Hui; Tsui Hark; So Man-sing
- Produced by: Tsui Hark
- Starring: Vincent Zhao; Moses Chan; Hung Yan-yan; Song Lei; Austin Wai; Chung Bik-ha; Valerie Chow
- Cinematography: Venus Keung
- Edited by: Tsui Hark; Kam Ma
- Music by: Raymond Wong; William Hu
- Production companies: Film Workshop; Paragon Films, Ltd.
- Distributed by: Golden Harvest
- Release date: 21 December 1995
- Running time: 101 minutes
- Country: Hong Kong
- Language: Cantonese
- Box office: HK$3,308,775

The Blade (刀) is a 1995 Hong Kong wuxia film directed, produced, co-written, and co-edited by Tsui Hark. It is Hark's homage to the 1967 film The One-Armed Swordsman and its sequels, and stars Vincent Zhao in the leading role. The cast also features Moses Chan, Hung Yan-yan and Valerie Chow.

The film is notable for its unusual style, which includes dramatic close-ups, employment of colour gels, and frenetic camera use during the fight sequences. Though a commercial disappointment on initial release, it was received favorably by critics, and has developed a cult following. At the 15th Hong Kong Film Awards, The Blade was nominated in two categories including for Best Action Choreography.

== Plot ==
Li Ding'an works as a blacksmith in a foundry run by his master, a friend of his late father. The master's daughter Ling is romantically attracted to Ding'an and his fellow blacksmith Tietou. Tensions rise between Ding'an and Tietou when the former reports the latter to their master for getting involved in a fight with some thugs, and after the master announces his decision to name Ding'an his successor. One night, Ding'an learns that his father was killed by Feilong, a notorious heavily-tattooed assassin, so he bids his master farewell and leaves with his father's broken sword to seek revenge. Ling tries to catch up with him but runs into trouble with the thugs. Ding'an turns back and fights the thugs to save Ling, but loses his right arm and falls off a cliff.

Ding'an is saved and nursed back to health by Heitou, a peasant whom he falls in love with. Seeing that he is now crippled, Ding'an gives up his quest for vengeance and endures humiliation while working at an eatery. Meanwhile, Ling and Tietou venture out in search of Ding'an. During this time, Ling becomes more disillusioned with society after witnessing Tietou take advantage of a prostitute he saved earlier.

One night, Ding'an and Heitou are attacked by bandits and their house is burnt down. Frustrated at his inability to protect his lover, Ding'an decides to pick up his father's broken sword again and learn the techniques in a half-burnt martial arts manual left behind by Heitou's late parents. His efforts are initially futile but he eventually makes a breakthrough, developing a devastating spinning movement which allows him to compensate for his handicap and broken weapon.

Ding'an kills the bandits and secretly saves Ling from danger. Later, he returns to the foundry, which is under attack by Feilong and his men. Ding'an shows up in the nick of time to save his master and fellow blacksmiths, ultimately slaying Feilong after a long duel. Ding'an then chooses to leave the foundry for good and lead a peaceful life with Heitou.

== Cast ==
- Vincent Zhao as Li Ding'an
- Moses Chan as Tietou (Iron Head)
- Hung Yan-yan as Feilong (Flying Dragon)
- Song Lei as Ling
  - Suet Nei as Ling (older)
- Austin Wai as the Master
- Chung Bik-ha as Heitou (Blackie)
- Valerie Chow as the prostitute
- Michael Tse as Kulou (Skeleton)
- Chan Wing-chung as the monk
- Chin Tsi-ang as Ling's grandmother
- Szema Wah Lung as Uncle Hua
- Yuen Bun as the bandit chief
- Collin Chou as Li Buhui (Fast Saber), Ding'an's father

== Theme song ==
The main theme, "Pain and Sorrow" (傷痛), was performed by Sally Yeh.

== Release ==
The film was released in Hong Kong by Golden Harvest on 21 December 1995. In the United States, it received a limited theatrical release in October 1996 by Warner Bros..

=== Home media ===
Warner Archive released the film on DVD in 2016. The Criterion Collection released it on both 4K and Blu-ray on 31 March 2026.

== Reception ==
When asked about The Blade, Tsui Hark once said,

"The Blade didn't do well at the box office for several reasons. I think one of the reasons is we didn't use really big stars in the movie. But I really like those actors, they were very authentic to me. And it was a little bit different from what I'd done before, it was a different style of action."

In 2014, Time Out polled several film critics, directors, actors and stunt actors to list their top action films, and The Blade was ranked 43rd on the list. In 2009 Quentin Tarantino named The Blade one of his top 20 favorite films released in the past 17 years.

=== Awards and nominations ===
Award	Year	Category	Nominee(s)	Result
Hong Kong Film Award	1996	Best Costume & Make Up Design	William Chang	Nominated
Hong Kong Film Award	1996	Best Action Choreography	Stephen Tung, Mang Hoi, Yuen Bun	Nominated
Hong Kong Film Critics Society Award	1995	Film of Merit		Won
