= Hiep Thi Le =

American actress (1971–2017)

- Born: February 18, 1971; Da Nang, South Vietnam
- Died: December 19, 2017 (aged 46); Los Angeles, California, U.S.
- Other name: Hiep Le
- Education: University of California, Davis
- Occupation: Actress
- Years active: 1993–2011

Hiep Thi Le (Vietnamese: Lê Thị Hiệp; February 18, 1971 – December 19, 2017) was an American actress. She is known for her portrayal of Le Ly in Oliver Stone's war drama film Heaven & Earth (1993).

== Early life ==
Le was born on February 18, 1971, in Da Nang, South Vietnam. In 1978, her father became a refugee, leaving Vietnam for Hong Kong. When Le was nine years old, her mother arranged for her and her younger sister to join their father.

We were told by my mom that we had to go look for Dad, and that he had gone to someplace called 'America', which we interpreted was the city across the river, since it had lights.

Along with approximately 60 other refugees, the girls hid in a secret compartment behind a galley pantry on a fishing boat sailing to Hong Kong to reunite with their father.

Sometime during the night, just as we arrived at a Vietnamese checkpoint, my sister woke up and started screaming for our momma ... "Everyone thought we were going to die", she says. That night, the boat captain grabbed her screaming 7-year-old sister and put a knife to her throat. Le witnessed it and it scarred her for life. "Tears rolled down her face, but there was no more crying ... I thought her eyes were going to fall out of their sockets", she says. Her sister survived, and when they both reached port, they stayed in a Hong Kong refugee camp. They eventually reunited with her father in Hong Kong. Le's entire family – her parents and five children – were eventually reunited in Northern California.

Eventually, Le lived in Oakland, California as a child. There her mother worked at a French-Vietnamese restaurant. She graduated from Oakland High School. She attended the University of California, Davis with a major in physiology.

Le originally planned to graduate in June 1993 and pursue a career in science. As a college student, she went to an open casting call in the Bay area "because all my friends were doing it for fun". She ended up being cast in the leading role of Oliver Stone's third Vietnam film, Heaven & Earth (1993), set amid the turmoil of the Vietnam War.

== Acting career ==
=== Heaven and Earth ===
Le was one of 16,000 Vietnamese-Americans seen by casting scouts for Oliver Stone's Heaven & Earth and was finally chosen for the starring role (of Le Ly Hayslip). "I don't know how I got here ... My cousin heard about these auditions for a movie, and I just went with a friend to see what it was about. They kept calling me back." In the film, she plays a woman who ages from 13 to 38, who is raped and tortured in Vietnam, and who becomes an abused housewife, mother, and businesswoman in the United States.

According to Stone, "Our people saw her, put her on video, thought she was electric, and flew her down to Los Angeles. I thought she was charismatic. We worked with her, put her on video with other actors, introduced her to Tommy Lee Jones and Joan Chen and Haing S. Ngor, and then we put her on film. We tested her out for about five months, continuously, and she won the role. I didn't send her to any acting school. I didn't feel that it was necessary; she was a natural."

Although the film required Le to age over 30 years and cast her opposite a number of accomplished American and Asian actors, the untrained actress received excellent reviews citing her sensitivity and actorly grace as Hayslip. In his review of the film, Los Angeles Times film critic Kenneth Turan described her as "nonprofessional but very capable."

When Le was asked what she had learned from her experience with the film: "I have grown a lot. I have grown so much in the past two years, but the experiences that I went through throughout my whole life really made me what I am today."

=== Later career ===
Le subsequently appeared in Bugis Street (1995, released in the United States in 1997) and co-starred in the little-seen Dead Men Can't Dance (1997). Le made an appearance in the 1999 film Bastards.

She appeared in Green Dragon in 2001, opposite Patrick Swayze and Forest Whitaker.

== Restaurateur ==
After her career in the film industry, in 2002 Le opened The China Beach Bistro, a Vietnamese restaurant in Venice, Los Angeles. After 10 years at that location, Hiep closed China Beach in 2012 and opened Le Cellier, a French-Vietnamese fusion restaurant on the Venice and Marina del Rey border. "Although it's not easy to find out here, French-Vietnamese food dates back to the 18th century ... This unique cuisine combines the fresh herbs of Vietnamese food with the fine heritage of country French cooking", Le said. As of 2016, she owned the restaurant Le Cellier with Mark Van Gessel and Bernard Louberssac.

On February 23, 2014, Le appeared on the Food Network game show Chopped, competing in the eighteenth-season episode "Beer Here!" Although she survived the appetizer round, she was eliminated in the entree round.

== Death ==
Le died on December 19, 2017, in Los Angeles from stomach cancer at the age of 46. She was acknowledged in the In Memoriam segment at the 90th Academy Awards.

== Filmography ==
Year	Title	Role	Notes
1993	Heaven & Earth	Le Ly	
1995	Bugis Street	Lian	
1996	Hey Arnold!	Mai Hyunh	Voice, Episode: "Arnold's Christmas"
1997	Dead Men Can't Dance	Sgt. Mia Yan Chun	
1998	Tracey Takes On...	Milou	Episode: "Marriage"
1999	Cruel Intentions	Mai-Lee	
1999	Bastards	Tony's Mother	
1999	Shark in a Bottle	The Tutor	
2001	Green Dragon	Thuy Hoa	
2001	Return to Pontianak	Charity Yamaguchi	
2003	National Security	McDuff's Secretary	
2007	The Princess of Nebraska	Mother at Mall	
2008	Julia	Kitty	
2008	Lakeview Terrace	Nurse	
2010	Sympathy for Delicious	Female Volunteer	
2011	Touch	Mother	Final role
