= List of Hey Arnold! characters =

This is a list of characters from the Nickelodeon animated TV series Hey Arnold!, where most residents live in the fictional coastal city of Hillwood, in the state of Washington.

== Main characters ==
=== Arnold Shortman ===
Contrary to popular belief, Arnold does not wear a kilt but instead dons a plaid shirt that hangs out of his teal sweater and a hat that only covers a small part of his football-shaped head.

Arnold Phillip Shortman (voiced by J.D. Daniels in the pilot, Lane Toran in season 1, Phillip Van Dyke in seasons 2–3, Spencer Klein in season 4, most of season 5, and Hey Arnold! The Movie, Rusty Flood voiced young Arnold in Parents Day (season 3) and Helga on the Couch (season 4), Alex D. Linz towards the end of Season 5, Mason Vale Cotton in Hey Arnold!: The Jungle Movie, Zane VanWicklyn in Nickelodeon Extreme Tennis and Nickelodeon Kart Racers 3: Slime Speedway, and Logan Bailey in Paramount+ commercials) is the titular protagonist of the series. He is a 9-year-old dreamer and an idealist who is wise beyond his years, and who always tries to see the best in people and do the right thing. His parents, Miles and Stella, left to go to San Lorenzo when he was almost two years old but never came back to Hillwood. Whenever he sees someone in trouble, especially Helga, Arnold goes out of his way to help them out, even if it is not sensible to do so. Arnold often acts as the stable center to those around him, whether he is around his "family" in his paternal grandparents' boarding house, or around his friends at school. He lives in Sunset Arms boarding house with his grandparents, Phil and Gertrude.

Arnold has two major crushes in the series; one on sixth-grader Ruth McDougal (through most of season 1) and one on a classmate named Lila Sawyer (from season 3–5). However, his most catalytic relationship is with his classmate and frenemy Helga Pataki. Helga is secretly in love with him, though to keep these feelings secret she bullies Arnold. Arnold is completely unaware of this fact for most of the series, other than the occasional hint from Helga and other classmates. Helga reveals her secret to Arnold during Hey Arnold! The Movie, but Arnold allows Helga to take back her confession, attributing it to "the heat of the moment". In the made-for-TV sequel Hey Arnold! The Jungle Movie, Arnold returns Helga's feelings with a kiss of his own, after thanking Helga for her help in finding his parents and using her locket to help activate the device that releases the cure to the sleeping sickness which his parents had contracted before they could release the cure. It is also implied at the end of the movie that he and Helga become a couple, as Arnold holds hands with Helga (although Helga pretends to be hostile to Arnold at once in public). Arnold is friends with most of his fellow fourth-graders, with his best friend being Gerald Johanssen, whose friendship dates as far back as preschool.

=== Helga Pataki ===
Helga Pataki in her signature pink and red dress and pink bow.

Helga Geraldine Pataki (voiced by Francesca Marie Smith) is a 9-year-old rough and cynical girl who puts on a mean-spirited, rude, deceitful, and tomboyish front. She is often portrayed as the local bully and as Arnold's arch-rival yet love interest. She constantly bullies Arnold and other people, yet secretly loves him, which is obsessive to the point where she has made many shrines dedicated to him. She is an academically gifted student and a talented writer of poetry for her age. She pretends to despise Arnold because he is a good influence, and often remarks about his football-shaped head (despite most characters having different head shapes). Helga is also known for her catchword, "criminy!", which she normally exclaims when stressed. She becomes the antagonist in some episodes and occasionally expresses interest in pursuing the latter as a career. The reason for this is that she is neglected by her parents and often disrespectfully calls them by their first names because she does not think they are worthy of being called "Mom" and "Dad". Her mother, Miriam, is usually depressed, forgetful, struggles to stay conscious, and frequently drinks what are implied to be alcoholic beverages, despite her referring to them as "smoothies". Her father, Bob, a successful pager salesman who suffers from workaholism, rarely notices her existence, favoring her over-achieving, neurotic college-aged sister Olga. Ironically, it was Arnold who helped her during preschool, as she was explaining that she would have lost her sanity if it had not been for his kindness, which she revealed during her therapy session with Dr. Bliss in the episode "Helga on the Couch".

Helga resents her older sister, Olga, a perfectionist in her young adulthood. Although Helga will do her best to avoid unnecessary contact with Olga, she has shown feelings of affection for her sister from time to time, as in the episode "Olga Gets Engaged", when she intervenes on Olga's behalf, saving her from what would have been a bad marriage, and "Big Sis", when she reveals her jealousy of Olga's relationship with Lila. In the episode "Quality Time", it is revealed that Helga hates corn and is allergic to strawberries because they give her hives.

In The Jungle Movie, Helga is shown to have an extensive video library of Arnold, which she and Phoebe convince Gerald to use for the contest for the class field trip that Arnold hoped to win to search for his parents, which proves successful. During the trip, Helga attempts to express her true feelings to Arnold, who is not in the right frame of mind to hear it at the time and leaves abruptly. This leaves Helga heartbroken, to the point where she rips up the picture of Arnold in her locket, which she discards along with its fragments in the river. She briefly becomes angry at Arnold after the class is captured by Lasombra, but when she sees Arnold crying quietly while looking at a picture of his parents, she forgives him and reaches for her locket for the picture, only for her to remember she discarded it. However, she finds that Arnold's torn picture was recovered and repaired by Brainy. She convinces Gerald to help her free Arnold so they can reach the Green Eyes before Lasombra gets there first. Together with Arnold and Gerald, they find the Green Eyes. Helga also comes up with the idea to use her locket to replace the Corazon that was lost while they were struggling with Lasombra, which activates the mechanism to release the cure to the sleeping sickness curing the afflicted Green Eyes and Arnold's parents. While she was attempting to retrieve her locket, Arnold thanked her for all she did and returned her feelings, resulting in them kissing. At the end of the movie, while it is implied that she and Arnold are now a couple, she reverts to her old ways. When Arnold tries to hold her hand on the way to school with Gerald and Phoebe but secretly likes that Arnold makes that attempt, and Arnold, now knowing how she thinks, is content to go along with it; she is only feigning hostility towards him in public to maintain her tough-girl reputation.

Series creator Craig Bartlett revealed in a 2018 interview that Helga's appearance was inspired in part by a young Frida Kahlo.

=== Gerald Johanssen ===
Gerald Martin Johanssen (voiced by Jamil Walker Smith throughout the original series and Hey Arnold! The Movie, Benjamin Flores Jr. in Hey Arnold! The Jungle Movie, Remond Francois in Nicktoons Nick Tunes, and Ramone Hamilton in Nickelodeon Kart Racers 3: Slime Speedway and Nickelodeon All-Star Brawl 2) is a 9-year-old boy and Arnold's best friend. He is an athletic and street-smart boy who is portrayed as loyal, though much less responsible than Arnold. Gerald is shown to have known Arnold for many years, most likely since preschool. Besides being Arnold's friend, Gerald also has knowledge of many legendary stories in the city, or "urban legends" as he calls them. He gets these myths from a source he has nicknamed "Fuzzy Slippers", mentioned in many episodes as his reliable assistant.

At school, Gerald is the class president and considers himself "very cool", and it is shown that his friends agree. When it was revealed that Arnold was on Rhonda's so-called "Cool List", and that Gerald was on her other list known as "The Geek List" (due to a grudge Rhonda had against him over running for class president), many classmates were surprised to find this out ("Cool Party").

His most distinct features are his tall, Kid 'n Play-style hair, and his shirt with the number 33 on it (he also wears 33 on sports uniforms). He has a crush on Phoebe, who shares the same feelings for him. At the end of Hey Arnold!: The Jungle Movie they are seen holding hands.

== Supporting characters ==
- Phoebe Marie Heyerdahl (voiced by Anndi McAfee) is the smartest girl in Arnold's class. She is Helga's 9-10-year-old best friend and confidante, though Helga tends to boss her around for some reason. Nevertheless, Phoebe acts sometimes as Helga's moral compass, advising her on what she should do. Her ethnicity is half-Japanese, half-European on her father's side and her mother is European-American (White Southerner), and she hails from Kentucky. Being the smartest girl in her class is very important to her, and she tries her hardest to keep the status. Throughout the series, both she and Gerald have an interest in one another, with Gerald implying a crush on her during Rhonda's party in the episode "Hey Harold". In Hey Arnold!: The Jungle Movie, Phoebe kisses Gerald on the cheek and is both seen holding hands at the movie's end, having finally confessed their feelings for one another.
- Harold Berman (voiced by Justin Shenkarow) is an overweight Jewish American friend of Arnold. Although portrayed as the school bully during the first season, he became more of a companion to Arnold and the other kids later on as his antagonistic role increasingly shifted over to Wolfgang. Despite his frequent bullying and intimidation of other students, Harold's bullying never involves stealing lunch money; he is often revealed to be rather cowardly and usually cries for his mother whenever he gets scared or upset. He is sometimes referred to by the derisive nickname "Fat Boy", usually by Helga. Later episodes reveal that Harold has a soft spot. His best friends are Sid and Stinky. He works at the butcher shop after being hired as an apprentice.
- Stinky Peterson (sometimes spelled Petersen) (voiced by Christopher Walberg in the series, Jet Jurgensmeyer in The Jungle Movie) is a tall and lanky friend of Arnold's whose family is from Arkansas, and he is also one of Harold's best friends. Stinky has a Southern accent and a love for lemon pudding. His friendship with Harold had him originally portrayed in the first season as a bully and a sidekick of Harold's, though the former was later de-emphasized and he was reinvented as a more affectionate, mild-mannered, and romantic character viewed as the class "ladies' man", as he is romantically attracted to several female characters. He is shown to make up poems while Phoebe is feeling depressed. He shares a name with a character from Recess and from The Red Green Show.
- Sid (voiced by Sam Gifaldi in most episodes, Taylor Gifaldi in "April Fool's Day", and Aiden Lewandowski in The Jungle Movie) is a 9-10-year-old friend of Arnold and one of Harold's best friends with paranoid tendencies. He is always shown wearing a green baseball cap backward, a black leather jacket, jeans, and a pair of white Beatle boots. He often tells urban legends, with or without the assistance of Gerald. Perhaps his most well-known characteristic is that he typically ends up in ridiculous situations, such as becoming severely mysophobic, deciding to devote his life to Arnold after Arnold saves his life, and believing Stinky is a vampire, among other things.
- Rhonda Wellington Lloyd (voiced by Olivia Hack) is a 9-10-year-old rich, pompous, self-proclaimed fashion queen and friend of Arnold. She is one of the most popular students attending P.S. 118. Both of her parents are stereotypically preppy. Even though she is always seen as concerned about her style, Rhonda is a phenomenal athlete, practicing numerous contact sports, like baseball and football, not caring if she ruins her clothes or accessories. Rhonda started as a background character throughout Season 1, but was given a larger role, that started with the season 2 episode "Rhonda's Glasses".
- Eugene Horowitz (voiced by Christopher Castile, then Jarrett Lennon in season 1, then Benjamin Diskin for seasons 2–4, Blake McIver Ewing in season 5 and the movie and Gavin Lewis in The Jungle Movie) is a somewhat socially inept but optimistic friend of Arnold, the class jinx. Eugene is prone to several forms of misfortune and is often bullied. He believes Arnold is a jinx due to several of his past tragedies having occurred in Arnold's presence. Despite his theory, he has been shown on several occasions to suffer from his accidents in Arnold's absence. It is implied that he has a crush on Sheena.
- Lila Sawyer (voiced by Ashley Buccille) is a 9-10-year-old girl who came from a fictional farming community she calls "Pleasantville" and who lives with her father. Her mother is never seen or mentioned. Lila is Arnold's crush. However, she only prefers Arnold as a friend. She had a crush on Arnold's cousin Arnie. She knows that Helga loves Arnold and offered to help Helga become more like her in one episode. She is described by the show's creator as being a foil for Helga, someone who tries to suppress her darker side by acting overly nice and sweet - similar to how Helga tries to cover her kind, sensitive side with bullying. Lila also has the same first name and last name as the celebrity Diane Sawyer. In both Hey Arnold!: The Movie and The Jungle Movie, Lila is only seen in background cameos.

== Sunset Arms boarders ==
- Oskar Kokoshka (voiced by Steve Viksten in the series and theatrical film, Wally Wingert in The Jungle Movie) is a lazy, inconsiderate, mooching immigrant from an Eastern European country (in one episode he is referred to as being Czechoslovak), that remains unemployed through most of the series, until becoming a paperboy. He has a gambling problem, does not do what he promised, is unable to read the English language until getting assistance from Arnold, and is a pathological liar, even taking advantage of Arnold who often tries to help him out. His childish demeanor and whininess often irritate others. Despite all his negative, despicable personality traits, he does love his wife and feels bad when he thinks he has let somebody down. His voice resembles that of comedian Yakov Smirnoff and he occasionally utters Smirnoff's catchphrases. He shares his name with an Austrian artist.
- Suzie Kokoshka (voiced by Mary Scheer) is Oskar's hardworking, dedicated, mature, loving, and caring wife, who puts up with all of her husband's antics, selfishness, and laziness, though the two occasionally fight. In the episode "Baby Oskar" she has a cousin named Nancy and a first cousin once removed who is also named Oskar and was babysitting him for two days. She does not appear in The Jungle Movie, as it has been confirmed that she left Oskar.
- Ernie Potts (voiced by Dom Irrera) is a short-statured and hot-headed demolitionist who has a Napoleon complex. In the episode "Ernie in Love," he develops a crush and starts dating a plus-size model named Lola.
- Mr. Hyunh (voiced by Baoan Coleman in the original series and also by Wally Wingert in Hey Arnold!: The Jungle Movie) – His last name (a misspelling of Huỳnh) is pronounced: "win." He is an immigrant from Vietnam, working in a Mexican restaurant. Despite having a heavy Vietnamese accent when speaking, it is revealed that he is talented at singing country music with the singing voice provided by country singer Randy Travis. He can also play cello, guitar and trumpet quite well. One episode reveals that he has a long-lost daughter, Mai, whom he was separated from after he had asked a US soldier to take her out of Vietnam during the Fall of Saigon at the end of Vietnam War. They are finally reunited in the Christmas special "Arnold's Christmas", courtesy of Arnold, Gerald, and Helga. Mai's biological mother is never seen or mentioned, and no explanation is given for her absence.
- Mr. Smith is a mysterious character who lives in the boarding house. His face is never seen, nor has his voice ever been heard. He is resented by the other boarders due to this secretive lifestyle, as he does not share many of the main boarding house facilities, which are limited, based on the number who live there. He only appears in the first season.
- Lana Vail (voiced by Christine Ebersole) is a lawyer who resides in the boarding house. She wears a purple suit and has brown hair. She was a minor character, to begin with, and has brief appearances throughout the series. She has her only speaking appearance in "Heat".
- Mr. Purdy (voiced by Joseph Purdy) is only mentioned once in the episode "Gerald Comes Over" when Arnold collects the rent money. There are suspicions of him sharing his room with a chicken, this from chicken noises as Gerald listens from outside his door, never revealed, but covered up by him.

== Families ==
=== Shortman family ===
- Phillip "Phil" Shortman (voiced by Dan Castellaneta) is Arnold's cheery, fun-loving grandfather. He is 81 years old, as of the episode "Grandpa's Birthday". Arnold often comes to him for advice. He often tells Arnold stories about his past experiences, although he tends to stretch the truth. Despite responding frivolously to Arnold's problems, he will often provide good wisdom. While his advice is not usually the most helpful, his heart is always in the right place. He is a World War II veteran and claims to have single-handedly won the Battle of the Bulge by tricking a large troupe of Nazi soldiers into eating numerous cans of spoiled CHAM (a spoof of Spam), thereby poisoning them and creating a hole in the enemy line for the American troops to break through. Arnold does not believe his story at first, but it is later proven when Phil shows him a small monument of him hidden in some bushes in a park in Washington D.C. Phil was also a master at Chinese checkers in his youth, which earned him the nickname "Steely Phil". He is very healthy and spry for his age, as well as athletic. He has an older twin sister named Mitzi. When he and Mitzi were kids, they used to be close and they owned a Scottish Terrier named Pooter; but one day Pooter got out of their backyard and was killed by a milk truck. After that day, Phil and Mitzi stopped speaking to each other for 71 years. In the episode "Back to School", Phil admits to Arnold that he never graduated from grade school. Because of the Crash of 29, Grandpa Phil was forced to drop out and work in a factory to help support his family, until he reached maturity in the latter phase of the Great Depression. This was until he attended P.S. 118 and earned his grade school diploma.
- Gertrude "Pookie" Shortman (voiced by Tress MacNeille) is Arnold's wacky but wise paternal grandmother, Miles's mother, Stella's mother-in-law, and Mitzi's sister-in-law who is often seen doing outlandish things, including dressing up in a kimono, a gi, and a cat costume, going on heists, and acting like fictional and historic figures, such as Calamity Jane. She is called "Pookie" by Grandpa Phil and Gertie by Aunt Mitzi. She has a black belt. She and Phil had a similar relationship that Helga and Arnold have when they were Arnold's age (though her pranks were a bit more vicious and extreme), which implies that they are the same age.
- Miles and Stella Shortman (voiced by Craig Bartlett and Antoinette Stella) are Arnold's parents, Miles being Phil and Gertrude's son. They are adventurous and brave, though Miles appears to be clumsy and tends to end up hurt. They met while exploring in San Lorenzo, where they occasionally crossed paths with the Green-Eyed people, a mysterious indigenous tribe. They returned to the city after Arnold's birth, but were called back for "a final mission" when a friend informed them that the Green Eyes were in trouble; they failed to return, leaving their son under his grandparents' care. Arnold comes across a journal detailing some of their adventures years afterward. His pet pig, Abner, was a wedding gift to his parents from the Green Eyes. In The Jungle Movie, it is revealed that while trying to cure the adults of the Green Eyes who had caught the sleeping sickness, they ran out of medicine and began to work on making more; they ended up contracting sleeping sickness, leaving only the Green Eyes' children to watch over them and the other adults. However, they managed to make enough of the cure and planned to aerosolize it so it could cure everyone using the Green Eyes' technology. The technology was activated by the Corazon, a literal heart made of solid gold that was sought by the villainous river pirate Lasombra, who pretends to be Miles and Stella's friend Eduardo to trick Arnold in leading him to the Corazon. However, the Corazon falls down a ravine while Arnold, Helga, Gerald, and the real Eduardo are struggling with Lasombra. Helga gets the idea to use her locket in place of the Corazon, which she reveals to Arnold for the first time. It worked and the cure is released during the Green Eyes, and Arnold's parents return home with their son.
- Arnie (voiced by Grant Hoover) is Arnold's maternal cousin who lives in the countryside and strongly resembles Arnold. He likes to collect lint, likes plain flavored gum, count things, and read the ingredients on the back of food containers. He makes a peculiar snorting sound on occasion. When he visits P.S. 118, Lila develops a crush on him and attempts to attract his attention, but he develops a crush on Helga. He is often seen as strange, gross, dull, or stupid by those around him.
- Mitzi Shortman (voiced by Phyllis Diller) is Arnold's paternal great aunt, Miles's paternal aunt, Stella's aunt-in-law, Gertrude's sister-in-law, Phil's twin sister, and childhood rival. She is 81 years old. When she and Phil were kids they had a Scottish Terrier named Pooter. One day, Pooter was killed by a milk truck. After that day, she and her brother stopped speaking to each other for 70 (or 71) years.
- Grandpa Phil's father (voiced by Dan Castellaneta) is often seen in Grandpa's flashbacks of his childhood during the mid-late 1920s.
- Grandpa Phil's grandfather (voiced by Dan Castellaneta) is seen in one of Grandpa's flashbacks. Grandpa remembers when he was doing chores one winter while his friends were ice skating, only to be hit with a snowball by his grandfather who gave him permission to stop his chores and play.

=== Pataki family ===
- Robert "Big Bob" Pataki (voiced by Maurice LaMarche) is Olga and Helga's oafish, ambitious entrepreneur father, a successful beeper salesman who owns a beeper store. He has extremely high expectations for Helga and frequently compares her to her older sister Olga. Bob also frequently calls Helga by Olga's name by mistake, and is often neglectful to her. However, Bob does care for Helga as is evidenced in subtle ways. Bob has difficulty showing his emotions for Helga since the two always come into conflict with each other. He often mistakenly calls Arnold "Alfred". In The Jungle Movie, he still sells beepers despite Helga pointing out that nobody uses beepers anymore due to the prevalence of cell phones; it is implied that his business is not as successful as it used to be.
- Miriam Pataki (voiced by Kath Soucie) is Bob's wife and Olga and Helga's inattentive mother. It is hinted throughout the show that Miriam suffers from alcoholism, as she often drinks "smoothies" which sometimes contain ingredients found in alcoholic cocktails such as celery and tabasco sauce, forgets things, speaks in a slow, tired voice, has had her driver's license suspended, has to do community service and sleeps a lot (often in inappropriate places). Like Bob, it is shown in very subtle ways that she cares about Helga, such as checking in her room when she hears a crash. The unproduced Hey Arnold! spin-off, The Patakis, would have included her struggle with alcoholism and joining of Alcoholics Anonymous as a plot point. However, in one episode when Bob injures his back and cannot work, Miriam fills in for him. During the episode, Miriam sobers up and holds the fort, becoming more attentive towards Helga until she becomes a workaholic and realizes that she is ignoring Helga. Then, she quits and makes Bob return to work. However, her sobriety does not last long because in episodes following this one, she is back to drinking smoothies. Miriam was a champion bull rider before marrying Bob, and she used to be an Olympic class swimmer. In the same episode, Miriam also reveals that she regrets marrying Bob, which resulted in throwing her life away and presumably resulting in her insecurities.
- Olga Pataki (voiced by Nika Futterman) is Helga's intelligent, outgoing, beautiful older sister, who attends the fictional Wellington College, although in one episode, Helga says that Olga attends Bennington College, which is an existing college located in the U.S. state of Vermont. Olga possesses skills that demonstrate above-average intelligence, as in the episode "Helga on the Couch", she is revealed to be a virtuoso pianist in one of Helga's flashbacks, and when Helga mentions that she was also a straight-A student; Olga also attended P.S. 118 as a child and is praised by Helga's teachers for her achievements. Bob and Miriam consider Olga perfect, which bothers Helga. They sometimes confuse Helga with Olga. Olga gives Helga more attention than their parents and always has good intentions, but Helga does not receive Olga's attention or intentions very well and tries to push Olga away and keep her distance. It is revealed in "Helga on the Couch" that through the years, Olga has reacted to her family's problems by keeping quiet about the situations at hand; either Olga likes to avoid conflict since she rarely acknowledges her family's problems, is oblivious or is in denial. She later reveals to Helga that she is envious of her, as, unlike Olga, their parents never heaped unrealistic expectations onto Helga, comparing herself to a "wind-up doll" that performs for their parents. In The Jungle Movie she is Mr. Simmons's helper with chaperoning his students on a trip to San Lorenzo. When they arrive, she develops a crush on Che, a shipmate who turns out to be working for Lasombra, and is heartbroken when he locks her and the others up in jail. Later in the movie when her parents and Arnold's grandparents come to help them, Olga tells Big Bob that Che was mean to her and started chasing him and beating him up for breaking her heart.

=== Johanssen family ===
- Martin Johanssen (voiced by Rick Fitts) is Gerald's sometimes strict father, who complains about wasting electricity. He is a Vietnam War veteran. Although, he was said to be a lousy shot and hurt someone during training and was relegated to purely office duty. However, he saved someone while transporting documents to another office and was thanked for it during a trip to the Vietnam memorial. Martin is a document sorter in civilian life.
- Mrs. Johanssen (voiced by Shari Belafonte) is Gerald, Jamie O and Timberly's kind mother who keeps the family together. She is a cashier at the neighborhood market. Her given name is never mentioned in the series.
- James "Jamie O" Johanssen (voiced by Ben Aaron Hoag and Phil LaMarr) is Gerald's teenage brother, who bullies him. In the episode "Jamie O in Love", Arnold and Gerald spy on him to find out why he was being so nice to them and found out that he had a girlfriend named Sharice. One day, after Jamie O drops them off at a restaurant to eat lunch, they see Sharice and overhear a conversation between her and her friend that she does not like Jamie O and is going to milk him for all he is worth. Gerald tells Arnold not to say anything about it to him because they are worried, and that if he told them, he would stop being nice and would not drive them to an upcoming hockey game. Days later, Jamie O is seen doing Sharice's laundry and making her a soufflé. While juggling to do all those things, Jamie O accidentally burns one of Sharice's cashmere socks and breaks down sobbing. Feeling conflicted, Gerald decides to tell Jamie O the truth about Sharice and he does not believe him until he overhears her talking to her friend that he is a sap, causing Jamie O to realize that Gerald was right, and as a result, Jamie O broke up with her off-screen. The next day, to show that he is sorry for not believing his brother, Jamie O drives Gerald and Arnold to the hockey stadium.
- Timberly Johanssen (voiced by Avriel Epps) is Gerald's little sister. She usually causes trouble due to her desire for attention or naturally childish behavior. Unlike all the other children on the show, Timberly seems to age throughout the series. In her first appearance, she is four years old, but she already attends the first grade in "Timberly Loves Arnold", although this may be a continuity error, rather than intentional.

=== Heyerdahl family ===
- Kyo Heyerdahl (voiced by George Takei) is Phoebe's half Japanese, half Norwegian father. He speaks Japanese fluently. However, his surname is not Japanese, it is Norwegian.
- Reba Heyerdahl (voiced by Jean Smart) is Phoebe's Southern American mother from Kentucky.

=== Berman family ===
- Jerry Berman (voiced by David Wohl) is Harold's father. He tends to talk in a very low pitch and is more concerned about Harold's obesity than his wife.
- Marilyn Berman (voiced by Kath Soucie) is Harold's mother. She is more vocal with her scolding of Harold than her husband.

=== Horowitz family ===
- Nate Horowitz (voiced by Michael Jeter) is Eugene's father. He is equally unlucky as his son as seen in the episode "Fishing Trip".
- Mrs. Horowitz is Eugene's mother (only appears in the episodes "Eugene's Birthday" and "Parents' Day") who, unlike Eugene and her husband who are redheads, is the only member of their family with blonde hair.

=== Lloyd family ===
- Buckley Lloyd (voiced by Sam McMurray) is Rhonda's father. Whenever Rhonda gets very upset, he buys her things to cheer her up.
- Brooke Lloyd (voiced by Lori Alan) is Rhonda's mother who believes her daughter is a perfect angel who can do no wrong. In most episodes, she is seen talking on her cellphone.

=== Sawyer family ===
- Mr. Sawyer (voiced by Dan Butler) is Lila's father, seen in the episode "Ms. Perfect". He appears to be a kind and caring father. When Lila is new to P.S. 118 and being bullied by some of her female classmates, her father tries to be there for her. In the episode, it is revealed that he had been unemployed and it ends happily with him getting a job.

== Other characters ==
=== Other students of PS 118 ===
- Thaddeus "Curly" Gammelthorpe (voiced by Adam Wylie in most episodes, Haley Joel Osment in "Deconstructing Arnold", Steven Hartman in "Downtown as Fruits", Michael Welch in "Ghost Bride" and "Curly's Girl", and Nicolas Cantu in The Jungle Movie) is the class sociopath, more so than most of P.S. 118's other students. He has had meltdowns and outbursts throughout the show such as in the episodes "False Alarm" and "Curly Snaps". He also appears to have a major crush on Rhonda. In the episode "Curly's Girl", Rhonda pretends to be Curly's girlfriend for a week after he cleans her mother's new mink coat she wore for a school art show, but she is disgusted by his appeal.
- Torvald (voiced by Michael Bacall) is a fourth-grader who was held back for several years due to his poor math performance (to the point of not knowing the answer to 3x3) and is considerably older than the rest of the students. He is tutored by Arnold in one episode. In the episode "Tutoring Torvald", he is revealed to be 13 years old. He disappears from the series after Season 3, but made some background cameos in Hey Arnold!: The Movie and The Jungle Movie.
- Nadine (voiced by Lauren Robinson in the series, Laya Hayes in The Jungle Movie) is a young entomologist and Rhonda's best friend. She tends to find a lot of Rhonda's more stuck-up opinions ridiculous. In the episode "Dinner for Four", she sets cockroaches free in a restaurant as a favor for Helga. This is the only episode where she has a bigger role than Rhonda, for her usual role is Rhonda's satellite character. In "Parents Day", Nadine is shown to be half black and half white on her mother's and father's side respectively.
- Sheena (voiced by Francesca Marie Smith) is a geeky girl who does not like violence. Her aunt Shelly is the school nurse, and her uncle Earl rows a boat. It is implied that Sheena has a crush on Eugene Horowitz. She has the medical condition of giantism.
- Lorenzo (voiced by Victor Samuel Lopez) is a wealthy Hispanic American boy who did not have enough time to be a kid, because of his mother's schedule. Arnold and the other kids teach him what it means to be a kid. In the episode "Arnold's Room" he and Sid are partners for a science project at school after seeing Lorenzo's bedroom, Sid is worried that his bedroom is not good enough to show Lorenzo so he borrows Arnold's bedroom so they could work together. At the end of the episode, when Arnold and the rest of his guy friends come over to play card games, Sid knocks on the door and Lorenzo asks him why he is knocking if it is his room. Sid breaks down crying after explaining why he lied to him. Lorenzo forgives him if he promises never to lie to him again and to show that everything is hunky-dory. Arnold invites them both to join him and the others in playing cards.
- Iggy (voiced by Justin Shenkarow in "Downtown as Fruits", Sam Gifaldi in "Heat", Marcus Toji in "Stoop Kid" and Joseph Ashton in "Arnold Betrays Iggy" and "Gerald's Game") is a friend of Arnold's who is considered popular amongst his classmates. During the first season, he was shown as something of a troublemaker who would sometimes cooperate with Harold in mischievous deeds. His shirt tails stick out like Arnold's, creating an illusion of a kilt, and he almost always wears dark sunglasses that he rarely takes off. Iggy is infamous for the episode "Arnold Betrays Iggy", where his classmates find out he wears pink and white bunny pajamas after Sid and Stinky discover it and he blames Arnold for it, angrily rejecting his apologetic actions until Arnold reluctantly subjects himself to a widely publicized humiliation from many of his kid and adult friends by wearing the same bunny pajamas in front of him in public; during this time, Iggy finds out that Sid and Stinky were the true culprits and tries to apologize to Arnold afterward, but Arnold only gives him an angry look, implying that he is too angry to forgive him. In later episodes, however, there is no continuing animosity between the two as Iggy continues to associate with Arnold as one of the latter's extended friend circle, implying that Arnold has either eventually forgiven him or the time has passed long enough to be as if it never happened.
- Brainy (voiced by Craig Bartlett) is a geek and Helga's stalker who is usually knocked unconscious by Helga without Helga looking at him. He seems to be romantically attracted to her. He has a similar hairstyle to Bart Simpson from The Simpsons. He has a very deep voice, wheezes noisily, and never talks in a complete sentence. He rarely appears except when Helga looks at her locket containing a picture of Arnold. Brainy has not told anybody else about Helga's crush on Arnold. In The Jungle Movie, he continues to stalk Helga though he ends up helping her by retrieving her locket and Arnold's torn-up picture which Helga discarded in anger after Arnold had seemingly rejected her, giving the locket and the repaired picture back to Helga after the class had been captured by Lasombra. Having forgiven Arnold, Helga thanked Brainy by kissing him before rushing off much to his surprise and delight. Helga's locket would later play a key role in releasing the cure that cured Arnold's parents and the Green Eyes, which would not have been possible had Brainy not retrieved it for Helga.
- Park (voiced by Marcus Toji) is a Korean-American boy who is a close friend of Arnold and others. In the episode "Longest Monday", it is revealed that he has a secret hideout at the local junkyard. He only speaks in seasons 1–3.
- Joey Stevenson (voiced by Justin Shenkarow in earlier appearances, Michael Fishman in later appearances) is an African-American boy who is easy to remember by knowing he is missing a tooth. He often appears among Arnold's extended friend circle, though his most prominent roles are in the first season when he is part of Harold's group of friends, along with Iggy, Stinky, and Sid.
- Seymour Stump (voiced by Toran Caudell) is a student who was first seen in "Spelling Bee" where he competed in the titular event. After Arnold patted him on the back after Seymour spelled "Pasquinade", an earpiece fell off him as it is shown that his mother was helping from within her van. The unnamed moderator sees the earpiece and has a security guard named Heinz remove him from the competition as Seymour screams that he's innocent. Seymour made four non-speaking appearances in "The High Life", "The Longest Monday", "Roller Coaster", and "Helga on the Couch"
- Peapod Kid (voiced by Jamil Walker Smith) is a wealthy and well-spoken fourth-grade student. In "Downtown as Fruits" he was unnamed but was credited as "Peapod Kid" because his costume for the school play was a pea pod. The name stuck and in later episodes, he is called Peapod or Peapod Kid by the other children.
- Robert (voiced by Christopher J. Castile in "The Vacant Lot", Justin Shenkarow in "Rich Guy", and Sam Gifaldi in "Hey Harold") is a blonde fourth-grade student with a green shirt and glasses who commonly appears to make up the numbers, especially during team sports involving Arnold's extended circle. His name is never said in person, but has appeared on scoreboards twice.
- "Chocolate Boy" (voiced by Jordan Warkol) is a boy obsessed with chocolate. In "Chocolate Boy", it is revealed he eats chocolate because his nanny fed him large amounts of chocolate before she left to a "far away land called Delaware". Arnold helps break Chocolate Boy of his obsession, but he only becomes as equally over-excessive eating radishes as a replacement.
- Wolfgang (voiced by Toran Caudell) is the main bully of the block who is a fifth-grader and Arnold's arch-enemy. He is more of a bully than Helga or Harold, and leads the other fifth-grade bullies in their troublemaking against younger students, especially the fourth-graders whom they often compete against. Similarly to Arnold, Wolfgang is somewhat popular with many friends in his grade, aside from his mildly dimwitted right-hand man, Edmund. Introduced during the second season, Wolfgang was created as a way for Caudell to stay as part of the voice cast on the show, as he was going through puberty and could no longer voice Arnold as a result.
  - Edmund (voiced by Tim Wiley) is Wolfgang's best friend and sidekick. He often asks stupid questions, causing Wolfgang to remark "Shut up, Edmund."
  - Mickey (voiced by Marty York) is a diminutive fifth-grader who is nicknamed "The Weasel" as seen in "Longest Monday."
- Gloria (voiced by Francesca Smith) is a girl who looks like Helga, but is more girly and has a nicer personality. Her first appearance is in "Magic Show" as a dream vision, but she is revealed to be real in-universe in "Helga's Boyfriend" when Stinky begins dating her. She also appears as an extra in "Cool Party".
- Ludwig (voiced by Phillip Van Dyke) is a bully who only appears in the episode "New Bully on the Block", where after leaving the juvenile hall, he, Arnold, and Wolfgang fight each other for control over Gerald Field. But at the end of the episode, Ludwig and Wolfgang become friends and attack Arnold and his friends, leaving them hanging on a football goalpost well into the night. He never appeared again afterward. His name is likely a reference to Ludwig van Beethoven, a famous classical composer, as a counterpoint to Wolfgang who shares his first name with classical composer Wolfgang Amadeus Mozart, and similar to Wolfgang, was created so that there would be an episode featuring Arnold's then-current voice actor (Klein) amongst his previous voice actors (Caudell and Van Dyke).
- Big Gino (voiced by Cameron Van Hoy) is the school's mafia boss and loan shark, who enjoys victimizing students, particularly Sid in "Big Gino" with harassment and threats, when they fail to pay back on time what is loaned. Despite being called "Big" Gino, he is very short and thin. In addition, Big Gino is accompanied by two unnamed underlings who do his bidding.
- Ruth P. McDougal (voiced by Lacey Chabert) is a sixth-grade girl who was Arnold's first crush. Arnold went on a date with her on Valentine's Day but realized that she was not very nice after he caught her red-handed with the waiter at the restaurant and left with him. In the episode "What's Opera Arnold?" She played the role of Carmen and Arnold played the role of Don José from the opera Carmen. But was interrupted by Helga who slingshot Ruth into a trap door on stage in the middle of the kissing scene. Ruth was phased out of lines after season 2.
- Connie and Maria (voiced by Pamela Hayden and Mayim Bialik respectively) are two sixth-grade girls, Maria is Mexican American and often uses Spanish words in discussion. They ask Arnold and Gerald to be their dates in the episode " Sixth Grade Girls" although just to use them to make their boyfriends jealous, both agree that they are sweet and have the potential to attract their interest in the future when they are older than fourth graders. The two often appear in later episodes when the sixth-grade classroom is shown, either with or without dialogue. In the episode "Phoebe Skips", they (along with their two other friends Cookie and Simone) tricked Phoebe into doing their homework for them while they watched a soap opera. Near the end of the episode, there was a new girl named Siobhan who got transferred from the third grade-to their sixth-grade class. They told Phoebe that they no longer needed her services and planned on making Siobhan their new homework girl.
- Patricia "Big Patty" Smith (voiced by Danielle Judovits) is an ill-tempered sixth-grade girl who becomes Harold's friend (it is implied that the two may have romantic feelings for each other as well). She is only aggressive towards any student who picks on her, calling her bad names, or saying mean things about her. In an earlier episode, she plans to fight Helga, but stages it instead. She even asks Helga if she and Arnold had feelings for each other, which Helga denies. In season 4, she becomes friends with Rhonda after they both attend the same finishing school together. She was also held back a couple of years and is 14 years old.
  - Mr. and Mrs. Smith (voiced by Henry Gibson and Zelda Rubinstein respectively) are Patty's parents. They both have the medical condition of dwarfism, despite their daughter having giantism.

=== Staff of PS 118 ===
- Superintendent Chaplin (voiced by Jack Angel) is the school superintendent who supervises schools in the city as seen in "Principal Simmons".
- Principal Wartz (voiced by David Wohl) is the strict, yet open-hearted principal of the school. In the episode "Full Moon" Harold, Stinky, and Sid mooned him and Principal Wartz did not see their faces. Instead, he saw Arnold first and accused him of mooning. Principal Wartz gave Arnold four weeks detention for not telling him who did mooned him. Attempting to convince Arnold to tell who mooned him, Principal Wartz tells Arnold about how his friends put a frog in their teacher's desk; his friends got in trouble with the teacher and she gave Wartz a gold star for telling the truth. This caused him to be beaten up by his friends, and they called him a "weasel". Frustrated and impatient, Principal Wartz told Arnold that he was going to check off the failure to cooperate box on his permanent record. Harold, Stinky, and Sid come clean and break down crying and Principal Wartz lets Arnold off the hook. In the episode "Suspended", he suspends Wolfgang for misusing the fire extinguisher. Hearing of this, Harold decides to get himself suspended so he can get a break from school; he calls Principal Wartz a "stupid dork" which has him suspended for a week. With his friends in school and nobody to hang out with, Harold comes up with crazy schemes to get back in school but is thwarted by Principal Wartz. Arnold tries to talk some sense into him but Principal Wartz suspends him for two days. Arnold and Harold decide to copy the school's regulations but tell him that they have the old policy. Harold broke down crying and begging for forgiveness. Principal Wartz accepts his apology and allows him back in school, on the condition that he catches up on the work he missed. He also lifts Arnold's suspension.
- Dr. Bliss (voiced by Kathy Baker) is a child psychologist who evaluates the students of P.S. 118 for a day and later becomes Helga's psychoanalyst. She is also the second known character that is told by Helga that she loves Arnold. This character only appeared in one episode titled "Helga on the Couch." She became a background character in Hey Arnold!: The Movie.
- Miss Felter (voiced by Julia Louis-Dreyfus) is a substitute teacher who was one of Arnold's "crushes". This character only appeared in the episode "Crush on Teacher." In the episode Gerald, overheard her talking in the teacher's lounge that she was going to have dinner with Arnold but it was her fiance who has the same name as him.
- Mr. Frank is a sixth-grade teacher who is quite bored with his job.
- The Lunch Lady (voiced by Kath E. Soucie and Danica Ivancevic) is an unnamed woman in charge of the school cafeteria. She is stereotypically brash in appearance but sensitive to criticism of the cafeteria food.
- Mr. Packenham (voiced by Daniel Stern in "Teacher's Strike", Craig Bartlett in later episodes) is a fifth-grade teacher. He is first seen in "Teacher's Strike" where he was among the teachers that go on strike and takes up a temporary employment at the bowling alley. Mr. Packenham appears in "What's Opera, Arnold?" when he chaperones Arnold's class trip to the Opera and in "Back to School" when Arnold's grandpa returns to school for a grade school diploma while in fifth grade, during his rapid progress from fourth through to sixth grade.
- Miss Slovak (voiced by Tress MacNeille) is Arnold's enthusiastic teacher (in the first season and part of the second season). In "Teacher's Strike", Miss Slovak was among the teachers that go on strike and takes up a temporary employment at the arcade. She leaves teaching to pursue a career in golf in the episode "New Teacher".
- Mrs. Uberman (voiced by Joey Paul) is a teacher. In "Teacher's Strike", Mrs. Uberman was among the teachers that go on strike and takes up a temporary employment at the bowling alley.
- Lieutenant Major Goose (voiced by John Garry) is Arnold's teacher for a short time after Miss Slovak resigned to pursue a career in gold and after Mr. Simmons' first attempt. Thanks to a tactic from Arnold when the other students couldn't stand him, they cause Goose to resign and had allowed Mr. Simmons to have a second chance with them. Goose was also was Martin Johanssen's drill sergeant during the Vietnam War as seen in flashbacks in the "Veterans Day" episode.
- Mr. Robert Simmons (voiced by Dan Butler) is Arnold's sensitive and caring teacher (since the second season). He officially replaced Miss Slovak after Principal Wartz attempt to have Lieutenant Major Goose do the job didn't go well. Simmons emphasizes the unique value of every individual in his class, with his constant reminder that "you are all special in your special way". In the episode "Principal Simmons" he becomes principal at P.S.118 when Superintendent Chaplin replaces Wartz with him. When the entire student body starts rebelling against him, he and Arnold go to Principal Wartz's house and beg him to come back to the school but also make him promise to not be so tough on the students. Mr. Simmons then went back to being a teacher. In The Jungle Movie, he became Arnold's fifth-grade teacher and he chaperoned his students on the class trip to San Lorenzo. In 2018, Bartlett confirmed that Mr. Simmons was gay, which had been alluded to in the episode "Arnold's Thanksgiving" with the appearance of his partner Peter.
- Nurse Shelly (voiced by Mary Gross) is the school nurse, and Sheena's Aunt. She had some speaking parts in some episodes. In the episode "Rhonda's Glasses" she gave Rhonda an eye test and helped her with her motion sickness. In the episode "April Fools Day", she helped Helga with her temporary blindness.
- Coach Jack Wittenberg (voiced by Jim Belushi) is the competitive school coach of many sports teams, which he often gets Arnold and his friends to join. He is portrayed as an aggressive and incompetent coach, and as such, is unable to motivate and guide his team properly. With Arnold's help, he can lead his team to victory, as in the episode "Synchronized Swimming", and is revealed to have a sensitive and considerate side. He has a poor sense of vocabulary, as he often mispronounces words while being confidently verbose. In the episode "Best Man", he asks Arnold to be the best man in his wedding and also has Gerald, Sid and Stinky as his groomsmen.
  - Tish Wittenberg (voiced by Cathy Moriarty) is Jack's wife who is the coach of the girls' teams. She and Jack often compete with one another. In the episode "Best Man" she asks Helga to be her maid of honor in her wedding.
  - Tucker Wittenberg (voiced by Grant Gelt) is Jack's son who is a student of PS 118. In the episode Benchwarmer, his dad kept putting him in the game even though he did not think it was fair to his teammates until he stood up to his dad after he benched Arnold and his dad apologized to Tucker and Arnold for his actions. He and his parents made a cameo in The Jungle Movie.

=== Other minor characters ===
- Rex Smythe-Higgins (voiced by Tony Jay) is Grandpa's nemesis from when he was a child, of an esteemed British family, and often shown to have cheated against him in the past
  - Rex Smythe-Higgins III (voiced by Joey Stinson) is Rex Smythe-Higgins' grandson, and similarly a rival to Arnold. However, unlike their grandfathers, the two have respect for each other as they shake hands following Arnold winning a boat race which Rex refuses to cheat in, and Rex even sides and helps Arnold rescue his pig Abner when his grandfather wants to eat him.
- Dino Spumoni (voiced by Rick Corso) is a famous jazz singer based on Dean Martin and Frank Sinatra. In the episode "School Dance" he performs at Arnold's school dance but sings a very depressing song which causes Arnold's friends to get angry with him and after having a heart-to-heart conversation with Arnold in the dressing room he changes his tune by singing an upbeat song and having everyone dancing in the cafeteria where the dance was being held in. In the episode "Dino Checks Out" he fakes his death to have his record sales improve. Later in the episode, it is revealed that he lived in Arnold's grandparents' boarding house where he used to work as a construction worker and used to perform at night. Later in the episode, it is revealed that Dino wears a toupee on his head and had multiple marriages. He is Italian American.
- Don Reynolds (voiced by Harvey Korman) is Dino Spumoni's estranged, bitter partner and songwriter.
- Mr. Bailey (voiced by Vincent Schiavelli) is a worker of the Hall of Records. His first appearance is in the Christmas special, where Arnold comes to him to help find Mr. Hyunh's daughter, Mai. His second appearance is in the series feature film, where he helps in trying to find the document of the "Tomato Incident". When he cannot find it, he tells Arnold about a man who keeps all kinds of historical records.
- Mayor Dixie (voiced by Tress MacNeille) is the female mayor of Hillwood. In Hey Arnold!: The Movie, she allows Scheck to redevelop Arnold's neighborhood, even though the city council rejected the idea. When she is shown Scheck destroying the document of the "Tomato Incident", she decides to make it a historic landmark once again.
- Mrs. Vitello (voiced by Elizabeth Ashley and Kath E. Soucie) is the owner of the neighborhood flower shop. In the episode "Part-Time Friends" She slipped on the floor of her flower shop and hurt her back but then Arnold and Gerald offered to run the flower shop for her while she rested her back.
- Councilman Marty Green (voiced by James Keane) is a dedicated butcher and later politician who works at Green Meats. He has two brothers, Dave and Benji, and a son who is a vegetarian. In the episode "Harold the Butcher" Harold steals a ham from his butcher shop and reluctantly has Harold work for him every day after school for a week until he pays back the ham he tried to steal.
- Earl (voiced by Dan Castellaneta and Craig Bartlett) – He runs a passenger ferrying service across the lake to Elk Island, in a row boat. Despite his profession, he reveals that he cannot swim in the episode "Busses Bikes and Subways" He speaks with a suitable pirate accent, given his job, as well as other pirate stereotypes. He is also Sheena's uncle.
- Davy Jones (voiced by himself) – Former member of The Monkees. He and his band were shown at the end of the episode "Fishing Trip". When he told the audience that the band would take requests Harold asked him if he knew "Miss Susie Had A Tugboat" and they performed it on stage.
- Mickey Kaline (voiced by Ron Perlman) is a retired baseball star and Arnold's favorite player. Arnold caught his final home run ball. After retirement he ran his baseball-themed restaurant, Mickey's Dog Pound. He is based on two famous baseball players, Mickey Mantle and Al Kaline.
- Jimmy Kafka (voiced by Richard Mulligan) is Phil's best friend when they were young kids. Phil often mentions him when he tells Arnold stories of his past exploits. They both have had a bittersweet relationship, based on many disagreements involving competitions and other activities, however deep down they are very close, despite possible continuity errors following season 1's "Part Time Friends" episode in which it is said that he has not spoken to him since falling out working together.
- Rabbi Goldberg (voiced by Elliott Gould) is a rabbi who gives Harold advice and guidance. In "Harold the Butcher", Rabbi Goldberg teaches Harold that stealing is wrong and he tells Harold a story about when he was Harold's age when his friend stole a vest from a tailor's shop and was punished and had to work in the tailor's shop to see how much work it took to make a vest, and in "Harold's Bar Mitzvah", Goldberg helps Harold prepare for his Bar Mitzvah.
- Alphonse Perrier du von Scheck (voiced by Paul Sorvino) is a greedy developer who plans to tear down the neighborhood so he can build a mall, but is thwarted by Arnold, Helga, and Gerald.
- Lasombra (voiced by Alfred Molina) is a Central American treasure hunter and pirate who endeavors to steal a relic called the Corazon from the Green-Eyed People. He disguised himself as Eduardo to trick Arnold and the others into luring him to find his parents and help the Green-Eyed People. Near the end of The Jungle Movie he falls off a cliff to his death, after a scuffle with Arnold, Helga, Gerald, and Eduardo and when he is hit by a poison dart which turns his skin green and makes him go ballistic, but not before he tried to toss Arnold down a cliff and take the necklace.
  - Che (voiced by Lane Toran) is a henchman of Lasombra. Helga's older sister Olga develops a crush on him before it's revealed that he works for Lasombra. Later in the movie when Arnold's grandparents and The Patakis come to San Lorenzo and rescue the others and after hearing that Che was mean to her, Big Bob starts chasing Che and beating him up for breaking Olga's heart.
  - Paulo (voiced by Jamil Walker Smith) is a henchman of Lasombra.
- Nick Vermicelli (voiced by Dan Castellaneta) is one of Big Bob's business associates, and later an accomplice of Scheck.
- Stoop Kid (voiced by Danny Cooksey) is a teenage boy who lives on a stoop and never leaves it until the episode "Stoop Kid", when Arnold coaxes Stoop Kid to finally have the courage to leave his stoop. The only other time Stoop Kid is seen off of his stoop is in the episode "Arnold Betrays Iggy", where Stoop Kid is seen in the crowd of people near the end of the episode, "Eugene, Eugene!", when he is seen in the audience during the school's musical, and "Cool Party" when he was a guest at Arnold's 'geek' party.
- Campfire Lass (voiced by Francesca Marie Smith) is a young girl who is the head of a junior survivor skills-based troop, called the Campfire Lads. She speaks with a Scottish accent, though Arnold thinks it is fake, and is often seen selling various goods to raise money for outings, or visits.
- Willie the Jolly Olly Man (voiced by Dan Castellaneta) is the local ice cream man who is most often referred to as the "Jolly Olly Man". Willie is the driver of an ice cream truck that is frequently seen driving around Arnold's town. Throughout the series, he is depicted as unfriendly, deranged, depressed, and hated by his employer (who happens to be his father) until "Career Day", when Arnold helps him learn to adapt to the ways of his job and be nice to the children. On at least two occasions in later episodes, however, he continues to reveal crazy tendencies. In one episode, he was the umpire at a baseball game Arnold and his friends played against the fifth graders.
- Eduardo (voiced by Carlos Alazraqui) is an anthropologist from the fictional Central American republic of San Lorenzo. He was friends with Arnold's parents, Miles and Stella, and helped them during their expeditions in San Lorenzo. He is the last person to ever talk to Arnold's parents before they disappear into the dense jungle.
- Harvey (voiced by Lou Rawls) is the mailman who delivers mail and seems to occasionally give advice. He dislikes snow. In the episode "Gerald's Tonsils" he cheered Gerald up by telling him the story about his changing voice when he was about to sing in a school concert. He had no speaking roles after the season 4 episode "Chocolate Turtles" due to Rawls' declining health.
- Morrie and Vic (both voiced by John Mariano) are a duo often involved in criminal schemes. They set up a counterfeit penny operation in "Wheezin' Ed", work at an auto shop in "Grandpa's Packard", and are also seen as Oskar's friends in various episodes such as "Arnold as Cupid" and "Baby Oskar", frequently seen playing poker with him.

=== Animals ===
- Abner (vocal effects provided by Craig Bartlett) is Arnold's pet pig. He was a wedding gift from the Green-eyed People to Miles and Stella from a water basket. Phil wanted to cook Abner but Stella decided to keep the pig as a pet. Abner was mistaken for a girl by Stella, who wanted to name "her" Isabelle. In The Jungle Movie he stows away in Arnold's backpack on the trip to San Lorenzo. When Arnold, Abner, and Gerald get to Eduardo's house they notice that it was trashed and Abner sensed that something was wrong. When Arnold and the others get kidnapped by Lasombra and his crew, Abner swims to shore and catches an airplane back to Hillwood, and tells Phil and Gertrude that Arnold and his friends got kidnapped by Lasombra and were in trouble.

== See also ==
- List of Doug characters
- List of Rugrats characters
- List of The Ren & Stimpy Show characters
- List of Rocko's Modern Life characters
- List of SpongeBob SquarePants characters
- List of Jimmy Neutron characters
- List of The Fairly OddParents characters
- List of Avatar: The Last Airbender characters
- List of characters in The Loud House franchise
