= Nicktoons Winners Cup Racing =

2006 video game

- The cover art for the released CD-ROM version of the game
- Developer: Pronto Games
- Publishers: ValuSoft, THQ
- Series: Nicktoons
- Engine: OGRE
- Platform: Microsoft Windows Online Game
- Release: NA: February 15, 2006
- Genre: Racing

Nicktoons Winners Cup Racing is an racing game developed by American studio Pronto Games, Inc. and published by ValuSoft, with THQ. It was released on February 15, 2006, in the United States, exclusively for the Microsoft Windows operating system. It is the second racing game released in the Nicktoons series, succeeding Nicktoons Racing and preceding Nicktoons Nitro, and features characters from SpongeBob SquarePants, The Adventures of Jimmy Neutron, Boy Genius, Danny Phantom, and The Fairly OddParents.

== Gameplay ==
The game has the player race around different race courses as four Nicktoons characters: SpongeBob SquarePants, Jimmy Neutron, Danny Phantom, and Timmy Turner. Each racer has their own unique vehicle to drive, reflective of their character, as well as unique ability, which can be used against other racers. The game includes four race tracks, one from each of the represented series: Amity Park, Bikini Bottom, Dimmsdale, and Retroville.

Winners Cup Racing features three modes for players to choose from, each with their own unique gameplay styles: Winner's Cup, the game's story mode; Quick Race, a versus mode; and Free Diving, a sandbox mode to drive around the tracks. There are also various unlockable mini games.

By completing the Winner's Cup with each character, players can play as four additional characters: Plankton, Professor Calamitous, Vlad Plasmius, and Mr. Crocker.

== Reception ==
The game currently holds a 6.6 rating on GameSpot and a 5.1 on Gamepressure.
