= Nicktoons & The Dice of Destiny =

2025 role-playing video game

- Developers: Petit Fabrik; Fair Play Labs
- Publisher: GameMill Entertainment
- Director: Humberto Rodrigues
- Producers: Luiz Henrique Gomes Monclar; Luiz Paulo Pietsiaki Moraes; Clarita Solórzano; Andrés González Caldas
- Designers: Luiz Henrique Gomes Monclar; Mateus Orcese Trevizam; Matías R. Singer
- Artist: Charles Lacerda
- Writer: David Bergantino
- Composer: Carlos Aguilar
- Series: Nicktoons Unite! SpongeBob SquarePants
- Platforms: Windows; PlayStation 5 Xbox Series X and Series S Nintendo Switch; Nintendo Switch 2
- Release: September 30, 2025; Nintendo Switch 2; December 2, 2025
- Genre: Action
- Modes: Single-player, multiplayer

Nicktoons & The Dice of Destiny is a 2025 action crossover role-playing game featuring characters from SpongeBob SquarePants, The Fairly OddParents, Danny Phantom, Avatar: The Last Airbender, The Adventures of Jimmy Neutron, Boy Genius, My Life as a Teenage Robot, Rugrats, and Invader Zim.

The game was developed by Petit Fabrik and Fair Play Labs and published by GameMill Entertainment. It was initially released for Windows, PlayStation 5, Xbox One, Xbox Series X and Series S, and Nintendo Switch on September 30, 2025, to positive critical reviews. The game was later released on the Nintendo Switch 2 on December 5.

== Gameplay ==
Nicktoons & The Dice of Destiny puts a spin on the classic RPG style with 10 playable characters from the Nickelodeon animated franchises. Each of the characters have a different class and weapon they use to battles hordes of enemies in worlds based off of the shows they come from, but with a fantasy twist inspired by the D&D genre.

=== Characters ===
==== Playable ====
Franchise	Character	Class	Voice actor
The Fairly OddParents	Timmy Turner Cosmo and Wanda	Wizard	Tara Strong Daran Norris; Susanne Blakeslee
SpongeBob SquarePants	SpongeBob SquarePants	Knight	Tom Kenny
SpongeBob SquarePants	Sandy Cheeks	Barbarian	Carolyn Lawrence
Avatar: The Last Airbender	Katara	Spellcaster/Healer	Sabrina Fest
Teenage Mutant Ninja Turtles	Leonardo	Samurai	Seth Green
Rugrats	Susie Carmichael	Enchantress	Cree Summer
Danny Phantom	Danny Phantom	Rogue	David Kaufman
My Life as a Teenage Robot	Jenny Wakeman	Ranger	Janice Kawaye
The Adventures of Jimmy Neutron, Boy Genius	Jimmy Neutron	Engineer	Debi Derryberry
Invader Zim	Zim	Summoner	Richard Steven Horvitz

==== Enemies ====
Franchise	Character	Class	Voice actor
SpongeBob SquarePants	Sheldon J. Plankton and Karen	Wizard	Doug Lawrence Jill Talley
SpongeBob SquarePants	Dirty Bubble	Prehistoric	Tom Kenny
Rugrats	Angelica Pickles	Witch	Cheryl Chase
Danny Phantom	Ember McLain	Bard	Tara Strong
Avatar: The Last Airbender	Azula	Pyromancer	Suzie Yeung
Teenage Mutant Ninja Turtles	Karai	Druid	Kelly Hu
The Fairly OddParents	Jorgen Von Strangle	Fencer	Daran Norris
The Fairly OddParents	Vicky	Dungeon Master	Grey DeLisle

==== Non-playable ====
Franchise	Character	Voice actor
SpongeBob SquarePants	Gary	Tom Kenny
SpongeBob SquarePants	Pearl Krabs	Lori Alan
SpongeBob SquarePants	Mrs. Puff	Mary Jo Catlett
The Fairly OddParents	The Crimson Chin	Daran Norris
Avatar: The Last Airbender	Aang and Momo	Da-Ni Lin Dee Bradley Baker
Avatar: The Last Airbender	Sokka	Mark Allen Jr.
Avatar: The Last Airbender	Zuko	Vincent Tong
Teenage Mutant Ninja Turtles	Michelangelo	Greg Cipes
Teenage Mutant Ninja Turtles	Donatello	Rob Paulsen
Teenage Mutant Ninja Turtles	Raphael	Sean Astin
The Adventures of Jimmy Neutron, Boy Genius	Carl Wheezer	Rob Paulsen
The Adventures of Jimmy Neutron, Boy Genius	Sheen Estevez	Jeff Garcia (Note: This is Garcia's final performance before his death on December 10, 2025.)
Rugrats	Tommy Pickles	Elizabeth Daily
Invader Zim	Dib Membrane	Andy Berman

== Premise ==
In the world of The Fairly OddParents, Timmy Turner's wish upon playing "Creatures and Chasms" causes the Dice of Power to send him, his fairies Cosmo and Wanda, and among the other Nickelodeon worlds into a new medieval fantasy world with characters from their respective franchises, Spongebob, Katara, Leonardo, and Sandy Cheeks, dressed as characters from Timmy's Game. To restore the order, the fellowship must recover the lost Dice of Power through the many worlds they come from, now mashed together within the new world, and take on familiar foes from the Flame Fatale (consisting of Angelica Pickles, Ember McLain, and Azula) to the mysterious Dungeon Master that rules the world.

== Development and release ==
Nicktoons & The Dice of Destiny was announced in June 2025 during the Summer Game Fest 2025. The game was initially released on September 30, 2025, for PC, PlayStation 5, Xbox Series X and Series S, and Nintendo Switch. The game was released for the Nintendo Switch 2 on December 5, 2025.

On August 2026, a free DLC content brings characters from Invader Zim with a new challenge mode.

== Reception ==
=== Critical response ===
Reception

Aggregate scores
Aggregator	Score
Metacritic	76 (PS5); 70 (NS); 74 (XSX)
OpenCritic	44% recommended

Review scores
Publication	Score
Computer Games Magazine	6.5/10
Hardcore Gamer	3.5/5
Nintendo World Report	8/10

According to review aggregator website Metacritic, Nicktoons & The Dice of Destiny received "generally favorable" reviews from critics. 44% of critics recommended Nicktoons & The Dice of Destiny on OpenCritic.

Neal Ronaghan of Nintendo World Report rated the game an 8/10, praising its nostalgia, character selection, and approachable dungeon-crawler gameplay while noting its simplicity. Ruch of Hardcore Gamer states, "Nicktoons and the Dice of Destiny may not change the world with its simple gameplay and level design, but being the first proper Nicktoons crossover story in years is bound to let it worm its way into the minds of fans. While factors like a bizarre loot system and graphical issues hold the title back, anybody who is a fan of cartoons is bound to enjoy their time with this title."
