= David Kaufman (actor) =

American actor (born 1961)

- Kaufman in 2026
- Born: July 23, 1961 (age 65); St. Louis, Missouri, U.S.
- Education: University of California, Los Angeles
- Occupation: Actor
- Years active: 1982–present
- Spouse: Lisa Picotte (m. 1990)
- Children: 2, including Grace

David Kaufman (born July 23, 1961) is an American actor. He is best known for his role as Duane Preston in Down to Earth and for his voice roles, such as Danny Fenton/Danny Phantom in Danny Phantom, Jimmy Olsen in various DC projects beginning with Superman: The Animated Series, Dexter Douglas in Freakazoid!, Aldrin in The Buzz on Maggie, Marty McFly in Back to the Future and Stuart Little in the animated series of the same name. He often serves as a voice double for Michael J. Fox.

== Early life ==
Kaufman was born and raised in St. Louis, Missouri. His father is Jewish, while his mother is Catholic. Kaufman began acting at a young age in his hometown when his kindergarten teacher handed him the plum lead role of Santa Claus in the class Christmas play.

At the age of 18, Kaufman moved from St. Louis to attend UCLA; he was a student in the Department of Theater Arts.

== Career ==
He has worked with the Daly family of actors on several projects: He worked with Tim Daly on Superman: The Animated Series and its subsequent spin-offs, playing Jimmy Olsen. He also appeared with Daly in the series Wings in 1995 with his wife Lisa; the two portrayed a couple whose wedding Daly's character Joe and his fiancée Helen crash. He worked with Daly's sister Tyne Daly on Kids Like These, and reprised the role of Jimmy Olsen in Justice League: Doom.

Kaufman has also worked as a commercial actor. One of his most prominent roles was as a dancing stockboy in a 1989 commercial for Hi-C Ecto Cooler.

== Personal life ==
On June 30, 1990, Kaufman married actress Lisa Picotte; together, they have two children who are also actors, including Grace Kaufman. He came out as bisexual on Celebrate Bisexuality Day in 2021.

== Filmography ==
=== Film ===
Year	Title	Role	Notes
2000	Tom Sawyer	Additional voices	
2001	Pearl Harbor	Young Nervous Doctor	
2002	Role of a Lifetime	Chick Desmond	
2006	Red Riding Hood	Hunter's Father	
2006	Superman: Brainiac Attacks	Jimmy Olsen	Voice, direct-to-video
2008	Prom Night	Businessman	
2011	Green Lantern: Emerald Knights	Rubyn	Voice, direct-to-video
2012	Justice League: Doom	Jimmy Olsen	Voice, direct-to-video
2012	Superman vs. The Elite	Jimmy Olsen	Voice, direct-to-video

=== Television ===
Year	Title	Role	Notes
1982	Little House on the Prairie	Carl Edwards	Episode: "A Promise to Keep"
1983	Simon & Simon	Steve Bannon	Episode: "Bail Out"
1984–1987	Down to Earth	Duane Preston	Main role (106 episodes)
1986, 1989	Highway to Heaven	Joseph Soloman, Howie	2 episodes
1987	Night Court	Spiros	Episode: "Here's to You, Mrs. Robinson"
1987	Kids Like These	Richie	Television film
1989	Your Mother Wears Combat Boots	Jimmy Anderson	Television film
1990	Just the Ten of Us	Fred	Episode: "Perfect Date"
1991	The Last Prostitute	Bert	Television film
1991–1992	Back to the Future	Marty McFly	Voice, main role (26 episodes)
1991–1993	Matlock	Mark Randall, Danny Hayes	2 episodes
1992	Haunted Lives: True Ghost Stories	Tim Clanton	Episode: "Motel Hell"
1994	Animaniacs	Steven Seagull	Voice, episode: "Miami Mama-Mia"
1995	Dweebs	Morley	Main role (10 episodes)
1995	Wings	Rick	Episode: "Let's Call the Whole Thing Off"
1995–1997	Freakazoid!	Dexter Douglas	Voice, 9 episodes
1996	Night Stand with Dick Dietrick	Reed Sullivan	Episode: "Love on the Internet"
1996–2000	Superman: The Animated Series	Jimmy Olsen	Voice, recurring role
1997	Step by Step	Devon	Episode: "The Facts of Life"
1998	From the Earth to the Moon	David Gibson	Episode: "We Interrupt This Program"
1999	Touched by an Angel	Corey Leonard	Episode: "The Last Day of the Rest of Your Life"
2000	The West Wing	Bob Fowler	Episode: "The Lame Duck Congress"
2000	CSI: Crime Scene Investigation	Nate Metz	Episode: "Unfriendly Skies"
2000	Hollywood Off-Ramp	Stephen Dewalt	Episode: "Along Came a Spider"
2001	Citizen Baines	Charles Newton	2 episodes
2002	Presidio Med	Norman Drum	7 episodes
2003	Stuart Little	Stuart Little	Voice, main role (13 episodes)
2003	Justice League	Jimmy Olsen	Voice, episode: "Only a Dream" Pt. 1
2004	Boston Legal	Dr. Sam Karp	Episode: "Change of Course"
2004	ER	Nick Dunn	2 episodes
2004	Stargate SG-1	Mark Gilmor	Episode: "Zero Hour"
2004–2007	Danny Phantom	Danny Fenton / Danny Phantom, additional voices	Voice, main role
2005	The Closer	David Jones	Episode: "Fantasy Date"
2005–2006	The Buzz on Maggie	Aldrin Pesky	Voice, 18 episodes
2009	Star Wars: The Clone Wars	Jaybo Hood	Voice, episode: "Mystery of a Thousand Moons"
2012	The Avengers: Earth's Mightiest Heroes	Human Torch	Voice, 2 episodes
2012	The Legend of Korra	Arik	Voice, episode: "Long Live the Queen"
2014–2016	Doc McStuffins	Sproingo Boingo	Voice, 3 episodes
2015–2018	Goldie & Bear	Jack, Brix	Voice, recurring role (17 episodes)
2018	Hawaii Five-0	Trent Sanders	Episode: "Kopi Wale No I Ka I'a A 'Eu No Ka Ilo"

=== Video games ===
Year	Title	Role	Notes
2002	Stuart Little: Big City Adventures Stuart Little 2 (Video Games)	Stuart Little	
2002	Superman: Shadow of Apokolips	Jimmy Olsen	
2002	Hot Wheels: Velocity X	Nitro, Max	
2004	Nicktoons Movin'	Danny Fenton / Danny Phantom	
2005	Nicktoons Unite!	Danny Fenton / Danny Phantom	
2006	Nicktoons: Battle for Volcano Island	Danny Fenton / Danny Phantom	
2007	Nicktoons: Attack of the Toybots	Danny Fenton / Danny Phantom	
2008	SpongeBob SquarePants Featuring Nicktoons: Globs of Doom	Danny Fenton / Danny Phantom	
2014	Broken Age	Marek	
2021	Nickelodeon All-Star Brawl	Danny Fenton / Danny Phantom	
2022	Nickelodeon Extreme Tennis	Danny Fenton / Danny Phantom	
2022	Nickelodeon Kart Racers 3: Slime Speedway	Danny Fenton / Danny Phantom	
2023	Nickelodeon All-Star Brawl 2	Danny Fenton / Danny Phantom, Ectopuses	
2025	Nicktoons & The Dice of Destiny	Danny Fenton / Danny Phantom, Enemies, Incidentals	

=== Commercials ===
- AT&T (starring with Ray Walston)
- Pepsi (starring with Cindy Crawford)
- Blockbuster (starring with Magic Johnson)
- Kid Cuisine (voice of K. C. Penguin)

as well as spots for Honda, Hi-C Ecto-Cooler, Maxwell House, Dentyne, Chili's, Midas, Wendy's, Twiglets and British Petroleum, among others.

=== Stage work ===
Kaufman has earned several Los Angeles area critics' awards and nominations.

He has been a member of the West Coast Ensemble in Los Angeles for over ten years, performing such varied roles as:

- Skeets Miller in Floyd Collins
- Prosecutor Gilmer in To Kill a Mockingbird
- George Lewis in Kaufman and Hart's Once in a Lifetime
- Orestes in Electra
- Tyler in Sondheim and Furth's Merrily We Roll Along
- Ronnie Shaughnessy in The House of Blue Leaves
- Callimaco in Machiavelli's The Mandrake
- Eugene Jerome in Neil Simon's Biloxi Blues
- Paul Palmer in James Duff's A Quarrel of Sparrows at The Court Theatre in Los Angeles
- Stewie in the premiere of Richard Greenberg's Night and Her Stars at South Coast Repertory.
