= Nicktoons Nitro =

2008 video game

- Developer: Raw Thrills
- Publisher: Raw Thrills
- Platform: Arcade
- Release: August 2008
- Genre: Racing
- Modes: Single-player, multiplayer

Nicktoons Nitro is a racing game which is a sequel to Nicktoons Racing and Nicktoons Winners Cup Racing. It features Nicktoons characters from the SpongeBob SquarePants, Danny Phantom, The Adventures of Jimmy Neutron, Boy Genius, The Fairly OddParents, Invader Zim, and Avatar: The Last Airbender franchises. The game was released in August 2008 as an arcade game by developer Raw Thrills.

== Story ==
An average day in Bikini Bottom turns sour for SpongeBob SquarePants when he gets sucked into a mysterious portal. Jimmy Neutron, Danny Phantom, Timmy Turner, Invader Zim, and Avatar Aang are also snatched away from their own worlds and find themselves stranded in a mysterious laboratory. They then see the being responsible for their kidnapping: Lord Nitro, who desires that the abductees race through his planet solely for his amusement. Given unique vehicles and sent into racetracks based on their homeworlds, the Nicktoons compete not just for victory, but to escape from their mysterious captor.

When all six race courses are cleared, Lord Nitro emerges from his robotic suit and challenges them to a final race. After defeating Nitro on his Planet Nitro racetrack, the Nicktoons demand to be set free. Nitro denies their request and sets a self-destruct timer on his robotic suit before flying off. Jimmy then quickly reprograms the suit to make it send everyone back to their own home worlds.
