= Super Brawl =

Super Brawl may refer to:

- Nickelodeon Super Brawl, a series of Nickelodeon games
- SuperBrawl, a professional wrestling event held from 1991 to 2001
  - WCW SuperBrawl Wrestling, a video game based on the event
- Super Smash Bros. Brawl, a 2008 Nintendo fighting video game
