= Reign Storm =

Reign Storm may refer to:

- Reign Storm (Danny Phantom)
- Reign Storm (The Adventures of Super Mario Bros. 3)
