= Nicktoons Racing =

2000 video game

- PAL PlayStation cover art
- Developers: Software Creations (PC, PS); Pipe Dream (GBC); Crawfish Interactive (GBA)
- Publishers: Hasbro Interactive (Game Boy Color, PC); Infogrames (PS, GBA); Chicago Gaming (Arcade)
- Series: Nicktoons
- Platforms: Arcade, Game Boy Advance, Game Boy Color, Microsoft Windows, PlayStation
- Release: Game Boy Color; November 27, 2000; Windows; 2000; PlayStation; September 4, 2001; Game Boy Advance; 2002; Arcade; 2003
- Genres: Action-adventure, racing
- Modes: Single-player, multiplayer

Nicktoons Racing is a racing video game developed by Software Creations for the PlayStation and Microsoft Windows. An abridged version was developed by Pipe Dream for the Game Boy Color in 2000, while Crawfish Interactive developed another abridged version for the Game Boy Advance in 2002. An arcade version developed by Chicago Gaming was released in 2003.

== Plot ==
Various Nickelodeon characters each receive a letter invitation to compete in a Grand Prix for the top prize, the Krusty Krab Big Bun Award. The host of the competition, also the individual who sent the invitations, is an unknown, unseen driver of a sleek, black car with a tinted dome window simply dubbed as the Mystery Rider, which the participating racers are challenged to beat, as well as each other. Upon arriving and being announced by the Race Announcer, the Mystery Rider and other Nicktoons speed off to begin their first race.

Once the player ultimately completes the game and wins the final Cup to obtain the Krusty Krab Big Bun Award, their playable Nicktoon receives a year supply of Krabby Patties as it is hitched to their go-kart. The Mystery Rider arrives in his cart and is revealed to be Plankton. It stated by the Announcer that Plankton created the entire series of races as a plan to obtain the Krabby Patty secret formula. The winning racer then rides off into the sunset with their Krabby Patties and the credits begin to play.

== Gameplay ==
Nicktoons Racing focuses on engaging players in go-kart racing through various Nicktoons-themed circuit tracks in a variety of different modes, similar to the Mario Kart series. The game features a wide selection of playable characters from various 1990's Nicktoons. The game offers an Easy, Medium, and Hard difficulty for the gameplay (with the game allowing you to unlock subsequently harder modes by accomplishing the last difficulty fully in Cups). The game also has a multiplayer option and can be played with a second player via split-screen utilization (multiplayer is available to all versions of the game except the Game Boy Color).

Each track features power-up presents that allow the player to gain advantages against their fellow racers in the form of various weapons and obstructions, as well as small orbs that a racer can collect and utilize to get a short-term speed boost. Each track also contains a variety of alternate routes and shortcuts that allow the various racers to shorten their laps (the harder the difficulty selected by the player, the more likely the NPCs are to utilize the shortcuts).

Cups

The primary mode for the racing gameplay. This mode allows the player(s) to take control of one of the Nicktoon racers and compete in a series of 4 races in the form of a Cup. There are 3 Cups and the second and third have to be unlocked by beating the previous Cup series. This is the mode required to beat the game's main story, unlock all the tracks for other modes of play, unlock The Mystery Rider as a playable kart, and the bonus minigames.

Time Trial (Single Player only)

A mode that can be used by the player to test their speed ability on each unlocked track. After finishing your first lap, a ghost racer will appear and perform the lap as the player did it on previous lap.

Race for Fun (Single Player only)

A mode that allows the player(s) to race a single track without competing in a Cup. The player progressively earns random collectible rewards for a trophy shelf the more races they participate at in a row and win.

Versus (Multiplayer only)

A mode that is generally the same as Race for Fun, but for two players instead. This mode does not feature collectibles.

Relay

A mode that allows the player(s) to pick three characters and race them in a 3-lap relay where each character performs one lap before tagging in the next racer. If the player hits their next racer directly, they get an initial speed boost for their next lap.

Bonus Levels

Besides the main racing tracks, the game also has a single-player and multiplayer specific bonus minigame that you unlock as you play-through and beat all the cups in Medium and Hard Mode.

- For single-player (Medium Mode reward), the player unlocks the Hey Arnold!-themed level Big City Clean Up in which the player is given a time trial in order to find and collect 60 of the power-up presents seen in the main racing gameplay.
- For multiplayer (Hard Mode reward), the player unlocks the SpongeBob SquarePants-themed level Beach Soccer in which two players push a beach ball around a field attempting to score more goals than the other in a timed match.

=== Characters ===
The game has 13 playable characters, each with their own distinctive go-karts. The Game Boy Color version features a reduced roster of only seven characters.

- Angelica (Rugrats) (Note: Not playable in the Game Boy Color version)
- Arnold (Hey Arnold!)
- CatDog (CatDog)
- Daggett and Norbert (The Angry Beavers) (Note: Separate characters in the Game Boy Color version)
- Darwin (The Wild Thornberrys)
- Eliza (The Wild Thornberrys)
- Helga (Hey Arnold!)
- Ickis (from Aaahh!!! Real Monsters)
- Patrick (SpongeBob SquarePants)
- Plankton (SpongeBob SquarePants)
- SpongeBob (SpongeBob SquarePants)
- Stimpy (The Ren & Stimpy Show)
- Tommy (Rugrats)

Outside of the playable cast, other non-player characters make cameo appearances in the game's cutscenes and stages, such as Ren Höek from The Ren & Stimpy Show, Oblina from Aaahh!!! Real Monsters, Squidward Tentacles from SpongeBob SquarePants, and Rancid Rabbit from CatDog. Stump from The Angry Beavers appears as an in-game item. All playable characters retain their original voice actors via reused audio samples from their respective shows. The Race Announcer (voiced by Chris Jojo) is a fully new character created specifically for the game.

== Development and release ==
Nicktoons Racing was announced on May 11, 2000. The Game Boy Color version was released on November 27, 2000. The PlayStation version was originally slated for an October 2000 release, but was ultimately delayed to September 4, 2001.

== Reception ==
Reception

Aggregate score
Aggregator	Score
GameRankings	GBA: 78% PS: 70% GBC: 47%

Review scores
Publication	Score
AllGame	PC: 3.5/5; PS: 3/5
IGN	GBC: 3/10; GBA: 8/10
Nintendo Power	GBA: 18/25
PC PowerPlay	PC: 71%
PlayStation: The Official Magazine	PS: 1/10
Pocket Games	GBC: 3/10

IGN gave the Game Boy Color version a 3 out of 10, and the Game Boy Advance version an 8 out of 10.

== Sequels ==
After several years of re-releasing Nicktoons Racing for different consoles and platforms, with the last being the arcade version released in 2003, a sequel was put into production. Nicktoons Winners Cup Racing was released for PC in February 2006. In 2008, a third Nicktoons Racing game was put into production, and was released in 2009 as Nicktoons Nitro, exclusively for arcades. In July 2018, Nickelodeon Kart Racers was announced, and was released in October 2018 as the fourth game in the Nicktoons Racing series. On June 10, 2020, Nickelodeon Kart Racers 2: Grand Prix, a sequel to the 2018 game, was leaked by Target, was announced the next day, and was released in October 2020. Then two years later, in 2022, the fifth installment was introduced Nickelodeon Kart Racers 3: Slime Speedway featuring a cast of over 40 characters.
