= Your Mother Wears Combat Boots =

- Genre: Comedy
- Written by: Susan Hunter
- Directed by: Anson Williams
- Starring: Barbara Eden; Hector Elizondo; Meagen Fay; David Kaufman; Conchata Ferrell
- Music by: Jeff Barry; Barry Fasman
- Country of origin: United States
- Original language: English

Production
- Executive producers: Peter Locke; Donald Kushner
- Producer: Bill Novodor
- Production locations: Columbus, Georgia; Fort Benning, Georgia
- Cinematography: Harry Mathias
- Editor: John Blizek
- Running time: 105 minutes
- Production companies: The Kushner-Locke Company; Mi-Bar Productions

Original release
- Network: NBC
- Release: March 27, 1989

Your Mother Wears Combat Boots is a 1989 American made-for-television comedy film directed by Anson Williams and starring Barbara Eden, Héctor Elizondo, Meagen Fay, David Kaufman. It premiered as part of NBC Monday Night at the Movies on March 27, 1989.

== Plot summary ==
Brenda Andersen (Barbara Eden) is an overprotective single mother from Iowa, who does not want her 18-year-old son Jimmy (David Kaufman) to follow in the footsteps of her late husband (who died in a parachute accident in Vietnam) by becoming an Airborne paratrooper in the US Army. Instead she sends him off to college, and then moves to Alaska to take up a new job. But once she moves, Jimmy leaves college and enlists in the army. He initially keeps this a secret, and only tells her after he's completed basic training and is about to begin Airborne parachute training at Fort Benning, Georgia.

Brenda drives down to Georgia in an attempt to stop him, but when she arrives Jimmy has already entered Fort Benning. So she assumes the identity of an AWOL Airborne trainee named Susan Zimmel in order to enter the base and try to persuade Jimmy to leave. When Jimmy refuses to quit, she makes a deal with him – if she can make it through the Airborne training course herself, then he will not do the parachute jump at the end of the course, and will leave the army and return to college.

Brenda struggles to adjust to the strict military regimen and make it through the tough and physically demanding Airborne training course. Her fear of heights also causes her difficulties. This leads to a number of comic incidents, though her drill instructor, Sgt. Burke (Héctor Elizondo), fails to see the funny side. But with a little help from other trainees in her squad, Brenda perseveres, determined to get Jimmy to leave the army.

In the end, however, the experience leads Brenda to realise that Jimmy needs to complete the training in order to develop a closer bond with his late father, and gives him her blessing to complete the final qualifying parachute jump. She then conquers her fear of heights and also makes the jump herself.

== Cast ==
- Barbara Eden as Brenda Andersen
- David Kaufman as Jimmy Andersen
- Héctor Elizondo as Sgt. Charlie Burke
- Meagen Fay as Edie Winchell
- Maria O'Brien as Carla
- Conchata Ferrell as Specialist Mononaghee
- Richard McGregor as Barry Barnes
- Ernest Dixon as Sgt. Hawkins
- Suzi Bass as Rose
- Kate Benton as Susan Zimmel
- Matthew Ansara as Young Soldier

== Filming ==
Your Mother Wears Combat Boots was filmed on site in 1988 at United States Army Infantry School in Fort Benning, Georgia: it features the original barracks which housed the 555th Parachute Infantry Regiment (which has since been demolished and replaced with a parking lot), the Military Clothing Sales Store, the Airborne School Headquarters, the tank trail on Kelly Hill, and various training sites. Members of HHC 507th PIR were used as extras in the film.

Barbara Eden's real-life son, Matthew Ansara, makes a cameo appearance in the film playing a young soldier.

== Home media ==
Your Mother Wears Combat Boots was released on Region 1 DVD on May 10, 2006, by Hollywood Entertainment DVD.
