= Rickey D'Shon Collins =

American actor (born 1983)

- Born: January 17, 1983 (age 43)
- Occupation: Actor
- Years active: 1991–2008; 2017

Rickey D'Shon Collins (born January 17, 1983) is an American actor, most notable for providing the voice of Vince LaSalle in Disney's Recess. He also voiced Tucker Foley in the Nickelodeon animated series Danny Phantom.

== Career ==
He has done voice overs for other television shows such as Static Shock and Justice League. He also voiced Vince LaSalle in the Recess film Recess: School's Out. In 2006, he reprised his role as Vince in a crossover episode of Lilo & Stitch: The Series.

Collins has made guest appearances on live action television series, including as Eric Burton in Star Trek: The Next Generation, Blossom, Grace Under Fire, In the House, Roc, The Practice, and Without a Trace.

== Filmography ==
=== Film ===
Year	Title	Role	Notes
1993	Once Upon a Forest	Bosworth (voice)	
1994	Little Giants	Briggs	
1996	Jack	Eric	
1997	Warriors of Virtue	Chucky	
2001	Recess: School's Out	Vince LaSalle (voice)	
2001	Recess Christmas: Miracle on Third Street	Vince LaSalle (voice)	
2003	Recess: All Growed Down	Vince LaSalle (voice)	
2003	Recess: Taking the Fifth Grade	Vince LaSalle (voice)	
2005	The Golden Blaze	Leon (voice)	
2006	Happy Feet	Male Penguin (voice)	
2017	Little Brown Baby	Marcus	

=== Television ===
Year	Title	Role	Notes
1991	Home Improvement	Club Scout	Episode: "Wild Kingdom"
1991	Roc	Davey	Episode: "Rock-A-Bye Baby"
1992	Parker Lewis Can't Lose	Kevin	Episode: "Beauty and the Kube"
1993	Father & Son: Dangerous Relations	Project Boy	Television film
1993	Blossom	Devon	Episode: "Sitcom"
1993	Empty Nest	Les	Episode: "My Mother, My Self"
1993	The Sinbad Show	Kid	Episode: "David's Van"
1993–1994	Star Trek: The Next Generation	Eric	3 episodes
1995	Grace Under Fire	Charles Briscoe	Episode: "Sticks and Stones"
1996	High Incident	Boy	Episode: "Change Partners"
1997	Happily Ever After: Fairy Tales for Every Child	School Child (voice)	Episode: "Goldilocks and the Three Bears"
1997	Baywatch	Derrick	Episode: "Life Guardian"
1997	Brooklyn South	Darnell Withers	Episode: "Life Under Castro"
1997–2001	Recess	Vince LaSalle (voice)	Main cast
1999	Katie Joplin	Boy	Episode: "Charcoaled Gray"
2000–2002	Static Shock	Byron / Boom, additional voices	4 episodes
2001	The District	Al Jr.	Episode: "Old Ghosts"
2001	The Practice	Steven Miller	Episode: "Suffer the Little Children"
2002	Justice League	Chris McGee (voice)	Episode: "In Blackest Night"
2004	Without a Trace	Terrell Brooks	Episode: "Trials"
2004–2007	Danny Phantom	Tucker Foley (voice)	Main cast
2006	Lilo & Stitch: The Series	Vince LaSalle (voice)	Episode: "Lax"
2017	The Fairly Odd Phantom	Tucker Foley (voice)	Short

=== Video games ===
Year	Title	Role	Notes
2004	Def Jam: Fight for NY	Rome	
2006	Nicktoons: Battle for Volcano Island	Tucker Foley	
2008	SpongeBob SquarePants Featuring Nicktoons: Globs of Doom	Tucker Foley	
