= Danny Phantom =

American animated television series

- Genre: Action-adventure; Horror; Science fiction; Superhero; Comedy drama; Fantasy
- Created by: Butch Hartman
- Developed by: Steve Marmel
- Showrunner: Butch Hartman
- Directed by: Butch Hartman
- Voices of: David Kaufman; Grey DeLisle; Rickey D'Shon Collins; Colleen O'Shaughnessey; Rob Paulsen; Kath Soucie; Martin Mull
- Theme music composer: Guy Moon; Butch Hartman
- Opening theme: "Danny Phantom", performed by Deric Battiste and Guy Moon
- Ending theme: "Danny Phantom" (instrumental)
- Composer: Guy Moon
- Country of origin: United States
- No. of seasons: 3
- No. of episodes: 53 (list of episodes)

Production
- Executive producer: Butch Hartman
- Producers: Bob Boyle (season 1); Steve Marmel (season 1); George Goodchild (season 3)
- Editor: Otto Ferrene
- Running time: 23 minutes; 46 minutes (two-part episodes)
- Production companies: Billionfold Inc.; Nickelodeon Animation Studios

Original release
- Network: Nickelodeon
- Release: April 3, 2004 – August 24, 2007

Danny Phantom is an American animated paranormal superhero comedy television series created by Butch Hartman for Nickelodeon. It premiered on April 3, 2004, immediately after the 2004 Kids' Choice Awards, and concluded on August 24, 2007, totaling 53 episodes across three seasons. The first two seasons each totaled 20 episodes and the final season totaled 13 episodes.

Set in the fictional town of Amity Park, the series centers on a 14-year-old boy named Danny Fenton, who becomes a human-ghost hybrid after an accident with an unpredictable portal between the human world and the "Ghost Zone". Bearing the nickname "Danny Phantom" in ghost form, he then takes on the task of saving his town and the world from subsequent ghost attacks, using an evolving variety of supernatural powers. He is aided by his two best friends, Sam Manson and Tucker Foley, and later by his older sister Jazz, who for most of the series' run are among the only people who know of his double life.

Danny Phantom received five Annie Award nominations during its original run and has since amassed a cult following. Additionally, it has spawned video games, home video releases, toys, and various other merchandise. A campaign to revive the series called the Go Ghost Again Movement has spawned in recent years, including a petition on Change.org that has received thousands of signatures.

== Premise ==
Danny Phantom follows Daniel "Danny" Fenton (David Kaufman), a 14-year-old boy who lives with his eccentric ghost hunting parents, Jack (Rob Paulsen) and Madeline "Maddie" (Kath Soucie), and his overprotective but caring 16-year-old sister, Jasmine "Jazz" (Colleen O'Shaughnessey), in the small town of Amity Park. Upon pressure from his two best friends, Samantha "Sam" Manson (Grey DeLisle) and Tucker Foley (Rickey D'Shon Collins), Danny decides to explore the Ghost Portal created by his parents in their attempt to bridge the human world and the Ghost Zone, the parallel dimension in which ghosts reside. When Danny's parents plugged the portal in, it had failed to work, but once inside, Danny inadvertently presses the "On" button, which his parents naively failed to do, thus activating the Portal and infusing his DNA with ectoplasm, transforming him into a half-ghost.

Danny, who calls himself "Danny Phantom" in ghost form, develops the ability to fly, become invisible, intangible, and "overshadow" (possess and control) people after first learning how to switch back and forth at will between his ghost and human forms. Over time, he develops much stronger abilities. They include his Ghost Ray, a concentrated blast of energy he fires from his hand; his Ghostly Wail, an intensely powerful scream with sonic capabilities that knocks back anything caught in its path; and even cryokinesis. Danny is initially frightened by his new abilities and has little control over them, but he soon learns to use them to protect his town from evil spirits. Danny turns to the life of a superhero, using his powers to rid his hometown of the various ghosts and mutant animals which begin to plague it and are almost always brought into the world thanks to the sporadic activation of the Fentons' Ghost Portal. Sam, Tucker, and later Jazz are Danny's primary allies in his ghost-fighting activities, and help him keep his ghost-half a secret.

Danny's ghost form is a polarization of what he looked like when he first entered the Ghost Portal. When he "goes ghost", his jet-black hair turns snow-white, his sky blue eyes turn neon green, and the black-and-white jumpsuit he had put on before the accident appears in negative color, with the originally white areas of the suit appearing black, and vice versa. In the premiere episode of season two, a ghost grants Sam's inadvertent wish that she and Danny had never met; in consequence, Danny loses not only memories but his ghost powers as well, as Sam had primarily been the one to persuade Danny to investigate the portal in the first place, which led to the accident. Luckily, however, Sam had been protected from the wish by the ghost-hunting technology of Danny's parents, allowing her to persuade the now fully human Danny to regain his powers by re-enacting the accident. This time, before Danny enters the portal, Sam replaces the logo of his father's face on the jumpsuit, which she also had removed the first time (if she hadn't, it would have been part of Danny's ghost form), with her recently designed "DP" fused-letter logo on the chest so that it appears when he goes ghost from then on.

Danny faces threats of many kinds, including vengeful ghost hunter Valerie Gray (Cree Summer) who, for a short period of time, becomes his love interest, an enemy half-ghost Vlad Masters (Martin Mull), an old college friend of his father's and considered to be Danny's true arch-rival, and even his own parents who, as ghost hunters, view Danny Phantom, as they would and do to any ghosts, as nothing but a menace to human society. Furthermore, Danny tries to keep his secret safe from his classmates, teachers, and family. Throughout the progression of the series, Danny slowly realizes his own potential and purpose, while both worlds slowly begin to accept him as their defender.

== Episodes ==
Season	Episodes	Originally released	
Season	Episodes	First released	Last released
1	20	April 3, 2004	June 17, 2005
2	20	June 24, 2005	June 9, 2006
3	13	October 9, 2006	August 24, 2007

== Broadcast ==
Danny Phantom premiered on April 3, 2004, at 9:30 p.m. with its first episode airing after the 2004 Kids' Choice Awards. The final episode aired on August 24, 2007. Since the series' cancellation, reruns aired occasionally on Nicktoons until March 31, 2021. The series also aired on TeenNick's NickSplat block for the first time in January 2019, but episodes stopped airing on February 1, 2022, due to the discontinuation of NickRewind.

The series aired on CBC, YTV, and Nickelodeon in Canada. Danny Phantom also appeared on CITV in the UK as part of the CITV morning block Action Stations in 2008.

== Development ==
The conception of Danny Phantom began in the spring of 2001, during the success of the first season of The Fairly OddParents. While he was helping his mother move from Las Vegas to Los Angeles, Hartman came up with the idea of a boy as the main character of an action show, drawing inspiration from when he grew up watching Jonny Quest. He then had trouble deciding what type of superpower the boy should have before sticking with him being half-phantom. Hartman began brainstorming if the series was going to be based on franchises such as Ghostbusters or Scooby-Doo in case Nickelodeon would cut the series short for one season. In October 2001, the Nickelodeon executives surprised Hartman by inviting him to a dinner with them and telling him that they'd decided to greenlight production for the second season of The Fairly OddParents, while also asking him if he had any new ideas. Hartman happily responded that he wanted to develop a superhero show about a "ghost kid who fights crime," with the executives deciding to give that concept a chance. Danny Phantom was also the first Nickelodeon cartoon to incorporate story arcs, as their previous technique was making single episodes with repeatability. Hartman had multiple redesigns for the characters's faces and bodies between early 2001 to mid-2002, during the production for the second season of The Fairly OddParents.

== Merchandise ==
=== Video games ===
There have been two video games released for the main series. Danny Phantom: The Ultimate Enemy is a 2D platformer that adapts the events of the TV movie of the same name; it was released for the Game Boy Advance on September 8, 2005. Danny Phantom: Urban Jungle is a shooter game loosely based on the episode of the same name, released for the Game Boy Advance and Nintendo DS on September 19, 2006.

Danny is one of the main heroes in the Nicktoons Unite! series, appearing in all four games: Nicktoons Unite!, Nicktoons: Battle for Volcano Island, Nicktoons: Attack of the Toybots, and SpongeBob SquarePants Featuring Nicktoons: Globs of Doom.

Danny and other characters and locations from the series have also been featured in other Nickelodeon crossover video games, including: Nicktoons: Summer Camp, Nicktoons Basketball, Nicktoons: Freeze Frame Frenzy, Nicktoons Movin', Nicktoons Winners Cup Racing, Nicktoons Nitro, Nicktoons MLB, Nickelodeon Super Brawl Universe, Nickelodeon Kart Racers 2: Grand Prix, Nickelodeon All-Star Brawl, Nickelodeon Extreme Tennis, Nickelodeon Kart Racers 3: Slime Speedway, Nickelodeon All-Star Brawl 2, and Nicktoons & The Dice of Destiny.

Danny was one of several Nickelodeon-themed character skins released during a limited-time event in Smite on July 12, 2022.

Purchasable skins based on Danny Phantom and Sam Manson have appeared in the online game Fortnite.

=== Print media ===
In October 2005, Scholastic Corporation published a Nick Zone chapter book, Stage Fright, with an original Danny Phantom story written by Erica David and illustrated by Victoria Miller and Harry Moore. Danny Phantom also made several appearances in Nickelodeon Magazine, including original comics "Brat's Entertainment!" (featuring Youngblood) and "Seeing Red" (featuring Undergrowth).

A graphic novel, titled Danny Phantom: A Glitch in Time, was released on July 18, 2023. It was written and illustrated by Gabriela Epstein and published by Abrams Books. The graphic novel is set after the events of the series finale and features the return of Dark Danny. A sequel, Danny Phantom: Fair Game, was released on November 4, 2025.

=== Home media ===
==== CreateSpace releases ====
DVD name	Release date	Discs	Episodes	Ref.
Season 1	September 16, 2008	4	13 (early copies); 20 (later copies)	
Season 2	September 16, 2008	4	13 (early copies); 17 (later copies)	
Season 3	June 9, 2009	3	12	

==== Shout! Factory releases ====
DVD name	Release date	Discs	Episodes	Ref.
Season 1	September 13, 2011	4	20	
Season 2: Part 1	April 3, 2012	2	9	
Season 2: Part 2	August 28, 2012	2	12	
Ghost Hunter	October 7, 2014	1	5	
The Final Season	October 14, 2014	2	12	
The Complete Series	January 28, 2014	9	53	

=== Toys and apparel ===
For more than fifteen years after its premiere, a minimal amount of official merchandise was produced for Danny Phantom. In 2005, Burger King released a line of Danny Phantom kids' meal toys. In 2012, Jazwares Toys released a six-inch-tall action figure of Danny Phantom as part of their Nicktoons toy line. In 2020, Funko Pop released a limited edition Danny Phantom figure for that year's New York City Comic Con. The figure was also released in Target stores. Throughout the 2020s, Nickelodeon has partnered with companies such as HotTopic's BoxLunch brand and Kohl's to produce a variety of Danny Phantom merchandise.

== Reception ==
=== Critical reception ===
Danny Phantom amassed a cult following since its original run. Sean Aitchison from CBR said "Danny Phantom might have a few elements that firmly place it in the 2000s, but the storytelling and design still feel fresh and fun in modern day. The show was full of action and humor, and the characters felt real and layered. If you're looking for an old Nickelodeon cartoon to rewatch, Danny Phantom should be on your list." Eric McInnis writing for Study Breaks Magazine said, "The show offered fun comedy, memorable characters, and fantastic character designs for the enemies Danny had to fight in each episode."

=== Awards and nominations ===
Year	Award	Category	Nominee	Result	Ref.
2004	BMI Film/TV Awards	BMI Cable Award	Butch Hartman and Guy Moon	Won	
2006	33rd Annie Awards	Storyboarding in an Animated Television Production	Ben Balistreri for "Identity Crisis"	Nominated	
2007	34th Annie Awards	Character Design in an Animated Television Production	Ben Balistreri for "King Tuck"	Nominated	
2007	34th Annie Awards	Storyboarding in an Animated Television Production	Ben Balistreri for "Urban Jungle"	Nominated	
2007	34th Annie Awards	Storyboarding in an Animated Television Production	Shaunt Nigoghossian for "Reality Trip"	Nominated	
2008	35th Annie Awards	Storyboarding in an Animated Television Production	Ben Balistreri for "Torrent of Terror"	Nominated	
