= List of Danny Phantom characters =

Fictional characters

The animated television series Danny Phantom centers on young Danny Fenton and his coming-of-age story as a half-ghost superhero in the town of Amity Park. Over the course of the series, he betters both himself and his powers as he deals with ghosts, balancing his normal and heroic life in a community that does not initially trust him. His companions are his best friends: Sam Manson, a goth girl who is entranced by the "weird and supernatural" and Tucker Foley, a self-proclaimed "techno-geek". Danny often has to put up with the eccentricity of his ghost-hunting parents, Jack and Maddie Fenton, and his smothering but compassionate older sister, Jazz Fenton. His primary nemesis is Vlad Masters, a billionaire celebrity who is also a half-ghost.

== Main ==
=== Danny Phantom ===
Daniel "Danny" Fenton (Danny Phantom)
- Danny Phantom character
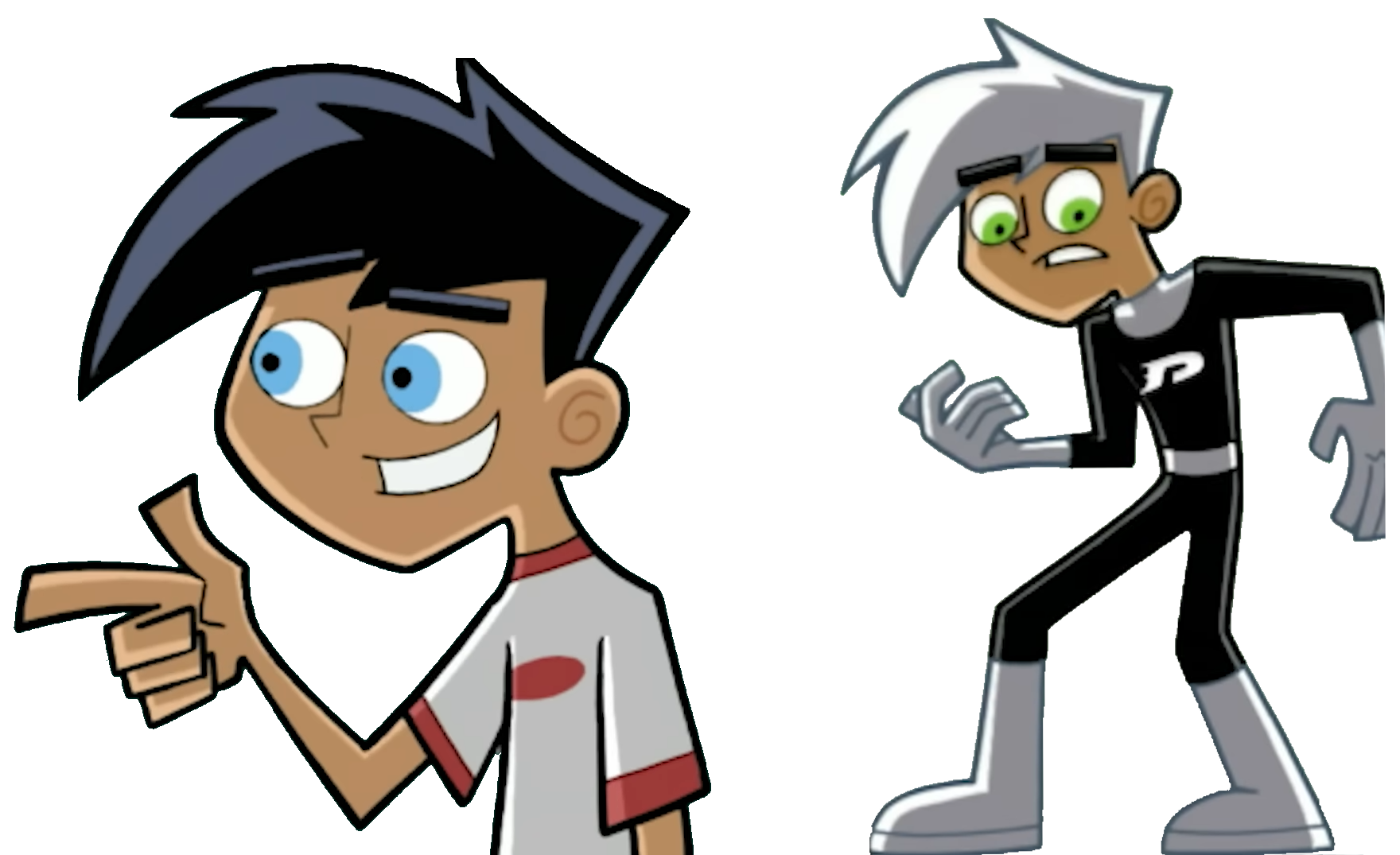
- From left to right: Danny in his human and ghost persona
- First appearance: "Mystery Meat" (2004)
- Created by: Butch Hartman
- Voiced by: David Kaufman (series, most video games); Keith Ferguson (Nicktoons MLB); Sean Chiplock (Smite)

In-universe information
- Full name: Daniel Fenton
- Alias: Danny Phantom
- Nickname: Danny
- Species: Human-ghost hybrid
- Family: Jack Fenton (father); Madeline "Maddie" Fenton (mother); Jasmine "Jazz" Fenton (sister); Danielle "Dani" Fenton/Phantom (genetic clone/"cousin"/adopted sister)
- Significant other: Sam Manson
- Relatives: Alicia (maternal aunt); Danny clones (clones, deceased); John Fenton Nightingale (paternal ancestor)
- Nationality: American

Daniel "Danny" Fenton, also known as Danny Phantom, is the titular main protagonist of the series. He is initially shown as an average, self-conscious, introverted, kindhearted, and sensitive 14-year-old boy who is desperate to fit in with his peers and be accepted, despite his parents' eccentricities. Danny thinks highly of his older sister Jazz, despite finding it annoying when she gets involved in his social life, and is in many ways as over-protective of her as she is of him. After an accident in his parents' ghost lab, Danny becomes a human/ghost hybrid, also called a half-ghost or halfa, and obtains a variety of ghostly abilities. A battle with the Lunch Lady Ghost places the unsure Danny on the path to becoming a superhero. Despite his flaws, he is good-hearted and loyal to his friends and family. He eventually grows, gaining great confidence in himself and maturity, and begins concentrating more on his heroic duties.

Danny possesses the powers of flight, intangibility, invisibility, sensing other spirits, and possession, as well as ghost rays. The ghost rays consist of laser-like "ectoplasm" which are emitted from his body; primarily his hands and fingertips. Over the course of the show, he gains various other powers such as duplication, forcefield creation, telekinesis, power absorption, and cryokinesis. In the two-part special "The Ultimate Enemy", Danny gains a power known as the "Ghostly Wail", which emits destructive waves of ecto-energy from his mouth. However, Danny obtained the Ghostly Wail 10 years too early, resulting in him being unprepared for its power. The Wail drains him of all his strength and reverts him to human form.

=== Samantha Manson ===
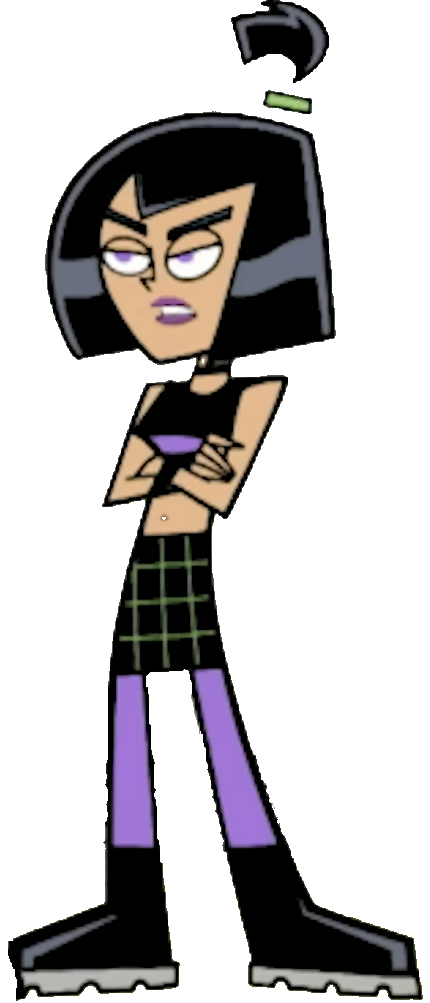

Samantha "Sam" Manson (voiced by Grey DeLisle) is one of Danny's best friends who later becomes his love interest and girlfriend. She is a goth girl whose parents, Jeremy and Pam, are social conservatives who inherited their money from Sam's grandfather, the inventor of "the machine that twirls the cellophane around the toothpicks", upon his death, though she briefly kept this a secret from her friends and peers, especially her female peers, to avoid "fake friendships". In the Christmas special, it was revealed that she and her family are Jewish.

=== Tucker Foley ===
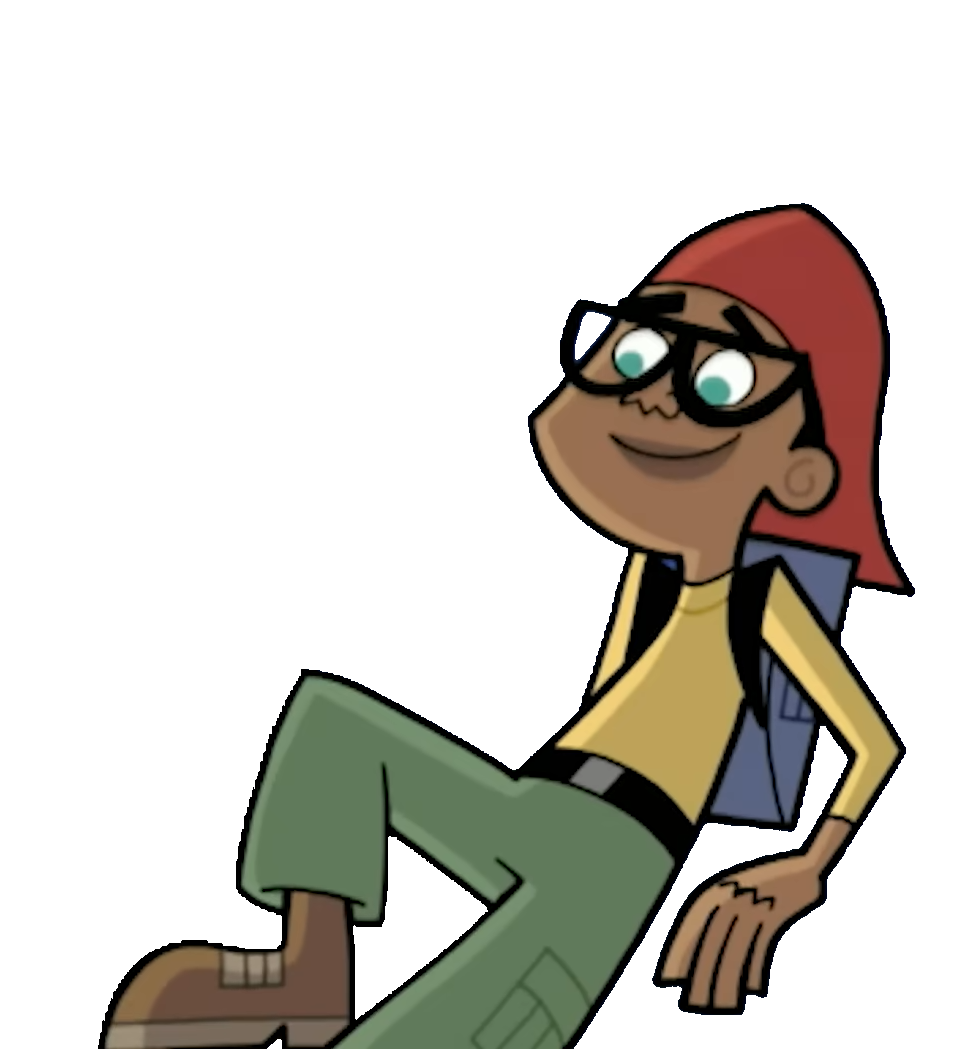

Tucker Foley (voiced by Rickey D'Shon Collins) is a black boy who is Danny's other best friend "since forever". Gifted with technological knowledge and a self-proclaimed "techno-geek", Tucker often helps by using his PDA to hack into computers and machinery.

=== Jazz Fenton ===
Jasmine "Jazz" Fenton (voiced by Colleen O'Shaughnessey) is Danny's intelligent and sociable 16-year-old sister. Viewing herself as the most rational and normal member of the family, Jazz often plays a surrogate parental role to Danny, thinking he's a naive child in need of guidance, unaware that she is often smothering him. At Casper High, Jazz is an overachiever, whose accomplishments unknowingly make Danny feel insignificant, under-appreciated, and stupid in comparison. Looking after her brother all her life has initially caused Jazz to think more like an adult then a teenager, unaware that Danny actually needs a big sister more than he needs a parent now that he is old enough to look after himself.

Due to her cherished goal of becoming a psychologist, Jazz has a bad habit of getting into people's personal space, which greatly annoys Danny, despite his knowing that she does it because she loves him and wants nothing more than to help him. When she secretly discovers her brother's secret identity, Jazz has made excuses for him while he went out to fight ghosts, and slowly starts to realize that her brother is growing up fine on his own. Along the way, she learns to appreciate her family's ghost hunting and actively takes part at times.

=== Jack and Maddie Fenton ===
Jack (voiced by Rob Paulsen) and Madeline "Maddie" Fenton (voiced by Kath Soucie) are Danny and Jazz's parents. They are professional yet bumbling jumpsuit-wearing ghost hunters who make it their hobby and goal to study and eradicate "all things ectoplasmic." While they serve as much embarrassment to their children, they are just as well respected and loved by them. Despite their obsession with ghost hunting, Jack and Maddie are loving parents who dote on their kids constantly.

Jack is the most obsessed with ghost-hunting. He jumps into action before thinking and can make a bad situation even worse. While he can often act clumsy and incompetent, he holds a great deal of courage and is an adequate fighter, at one point clashing toe-and-toe against Vlad Plasmius and defeating him In Pt. 2 of the "Danny Phantom Ten Years Later" video on YouTube, series creator Butch Hartman stated that he partially based Jack off Fred Flintstone.

Maddie Fenton (née Grant) is an accomplished ninth-degree martial artist and Jack's partner. Similar to Jazz, Maddie is very serious and more level-headed than Jack is, often supporting or trying to keep her husband from causing trouble with his gung-ho attitude, yet she can be aggressive and snappy at times. Jazz also seems to have inherited her intellect from Maddie as well, as Maddie herself is a genius scientist who has her fair share of anti-ghost inventions she herself creates alongside Jack; she also has degrees in chemistry, engineering, and quantum physics from the University of Wisconsin.

== Villains ==
=== Ghost villains ===
==== Amorpho ====
Amorpho (voiced by Danny Mann) is a ghost able to change his appearance into that of any human or animal at will. More mischievous than malevolent, he desires attention and pursues it by morphing into someone else's appearance, to play pranks that leave the corresponding person to take the consequences, for what he actually had done.

==== Bertrand ====
Bertrand (voiced by Jim Ward) is a small, amorphous blob-like ghost who can transform into various monstrous creatures. It serves Spectra and helps her enact her plans.

==== Box Ghost ====
The Box Ghost (voiced by Rob Paulsen) is a ghoul who constantly fights with cardboard and anything square (and the occasional bubble wrap). He is incompetent in his attempts to scare people and is barely taken seriously by either the heroes or the other ghosts. In an alternate future depicted in "The Ultimate Enemy", he is married to the Lunch Lady Ghost and has a daughter with her (Box Lunch).

==== Bullet ====
Bullet (voiced by Daran Norris) is Walker's second-in-command. He is only seen in minor roles in two episodes.

==== Dark Danny/Dan Phantom ====
Dark Danny Phantom (also known as Dan Phantom) (voiced by Eric Roberts) is a villain created by the fusion of the ghost-halves of Danny and Vlad in an alternative timeline. He was created with the intent that Danny's worst enemy would be an evil version of himself. Dark Danny is a cruel, malicious ghost who cares little for anything other than himself, causing as much destruction as he sees fit.

Dark Danny came to be after an explosion of the Nasty Burger restaurant killed Danny Fenton's family, friends, and teacher. Overcome with grief and guilt, Danny moved in with Vlad Masters, feeling that only he could understand his pain. Danny asked Vlad to remove his emotions. Honoring his wishes, Vlad separated Danny's human half from his ghost self; later, Danny retaliated, doing the same to Vlad. The ghost-half of Danny then attempted to possess Vlad, eventually fusing their bodies together. Plasmius's ghost-half overwhelmed Danny's, creating an even more evil and more powerful version of the two halves. He spent the next ten years destroying the world. Through time travel, the present-day Danny defeats Dark Danny and imprisons him in a Fenton Thermos which he gives to Clockwork.

==== Desiree ====
First appearance of Desiree in episode "What You Want"

Desiree as a human

Desiree (voiced by Peri Gilpin) is a genie-like female ghost who travels the world granting anyone's deepest desires. While compelled to grant any wish she hears, she is free to interpret and twist it any way she sees fit. In life, she was a harem girl who won the affections of a sultan. He showered her with whatever gifts she wanted but was banished by the Sultan's jealous wife. She died of a broken heart (and old age), and returned as a genie/wishing ghost. Desiree initially granted wishes with benevolence, but remembering her own happiness that was taken away, she became bitter, resentful, and jealous, thus leading to her current behavior.

==== Ember McLain ====
Ember McLain

Ember McLain (speaking voice by Tara Strong and singing voice by Robbyn Kirmssé) is a ghost of a power-hungry musician who hates authority. She thirsts for attention and has a cutting, sarcastic personality. She gains power when people say her name, as is shown in her first appearance when she attempted to gain power by performing her song "Remember" live and broadcasting worldwide in the hope that everyone would chant her name at the same time and empower her. She is somewhat similar to a Siren, as she can also hypnotize her victims, using her guitar as her main mode of hypnotism as well as a weapon.

According to Butch Hartman, Ember was once an unpopular girl who dreamed of becoming a rock star. When a boy asked her out to the movies, she accepted, but the boy stood her up as she waited for him all night. Once morning came, she returned home and fell asleep from exhaustion. As she slept, Ember was killed after her house mysteriously caught on fire.

==== Femalien ====
Femalien (voiced by Grey DeLisle) is one of the fictional characters from the film Trinity of Doom (a parody of Freddy vs. Jason). Femalien is a spoof of the villains from the film Predator. Femalien is brought to life by Desiree after Sam wished that something bad might happen to Paulina before her party.

==== Fright Knight ====
The Fright Knight (voiced by Michael Dorn) is the representative of Halloween. He is a powerful, gruff knight who spreads terror from his winged horse, Nightmare. Fright Knight's sword, the Soul Shredder, is able to send others into their worst nightmare via contact.

==== Ghost Writer ====
The Ghost Writer (voiced by Will Arnett) is an author who resides in the Ghost Zone. He can create anything by typing on his keyboard with the added effect of forcing everyone to speak in rhymes, which continues even after the keyboard is destroyed.

==== Hotep-Ra ====
Hotep-Ra (voiced by S. Scott Bullock) is the mummy-like spirit of an ancient minion of King Duulamun, an Egyptian pharaoh who resembles Tucker Foley. He was released from his eternal sleep when Tucker looked into the mirror at the front of Ra's sarcophagus. He served Tucker and helped him regain his kingdom as pharaoh, but secretly planned to take over the kingdom once it was restored. Deceitful and sneaky, Hotep-Ra was eventually defeated by Tucker when he realized he had been used by Hotep-Ra.

==== Johnny 13 ====
Johnny 13 (voiced by William Baldwin) is a rebellious biker. His living shadow brings bad luck to whoever it gains contact with. Always on the road, his constant companion is girlfriend Kitty. Despite their differences and Johnny's keen womanizing habits, they are in love with one another. Johnny spent the first time searching for a human host when Kitty was stuck between Ghost Portals and became jealous whenever Kitty would date someone else.

==== Kitty ====
Kitty (voiced by Chynna Phillips) is Johnny 13's ghostly girlfriend. She is constantly under dire stress over Johnny, wishing he would focus his full attention on her. She has attempted to make him jealous and at several points, banished him to an alternate dimension via her ghostly ability to send any man to another dimension with a kiss. Despite it, the two remain in love with one another.

==== Lunch Lady Ghost ====
The Lunch Lady Ghost (voiced by Patricia Heaton and later Kath Soucie) is the first major foe Danny encounters. She is very overweight and appears vowing revenge on Sam for making the school lunch menu vegetarian. She suffers from uncontrollable mood swings, turning suddenly from sweet and kind to violent and deadly. She consistently uses food (particularly meat) as her main form of weaponry. In an alternate future depicted in "The Ultimate Enemy", she is married to the Box Ghost and has a daughter with him (Box Lunch).

==== Lydia ====
Lydia (voiced by Tara Strong) is Freakshow's assistant. She is heavily covered with tattoos, which she can bring to life and control, and is most often seen shrouded in a cloak.

==== Medusa ====
Medusa (voiced by Grey DeLisle) is based on the character of Greek mythology of the same name. In "Boxed Up Fury", she is one of the obstacles Danny must get past to reach Pandora.

==== Nightmerica ====
Nightmerica (voiced by Grey DeLisle) is one of the fictional characters from the film Trinity of Doom (a parody of Freddy vs. Jason). Nightmerica is a spoof of Freddy Krueger. Nightmerica is brought to life by Desiree after Sam wished that something bad might happen to Paulina before her party.

==== Nocturn ====
Nocturn (voiced by James Garrett) is the ghost of sleep and dreams. Along with his army of Sleep Walkers, he travels the world, putting people to sleep and absorbing their dream energy to charge him up for world conquest.

==== Pariah Dark ====
Pariah Dark (voiced by Brian Cox) was the ruthless king of the Ghost Zone, until he was eventually captured by rebellious ghosts and sealed in the Sarcophagus of Forever Sleep, where he lay until Vlad accidentally awakened him. He immediately laid waste to both Amity Park and the Ghost Zone until Danny ultimately defeated him, using a power-enhancing suit to enhance his powers beyond their limits.

==== Prince Aragon ====
Prince Aragon (voiced by Dee Bradley Baker) is the ruthless older brother of Princess Dorathea, the Dragon Ghost. Their family treasured two magical "Amulets of Aragon" that allow the wearer to transform into a dragon. Under his rule, his kingdom was lifeless and unhappy. He constantly treated his sister cruelly. Seeking a human bride to obtain what others do not have, Aragon set Dora to find him a bride. She eventually finds Sam Manson whom he almost marries if not for Danny's interference. Aragon is defeated by his sister when she gets the courage to dethrone and banish him.

==== Sidney Poindexter ====
Sidney Poindexter (voiced by Peter MacNicol) is a nerdy teenager from the 1950s. He was known as the most bullied student of Casper High and thus, holds a soft spot and great concern for those who suffered as much as he did. Stuffed into his locker many times, Sidney haunted it for around fifty years, leaving only a mirror behind, a gateway to the dimension that he is trapped in. Able to free himself after meeting Danny, Sidney antagonizes Danny, believing him to be a bully when he catches Danny pulling a prank on Dash.

Sidney takes over Danny's body and gains popularity, while Danny is stuck in Sidney's body and tormented daily. He manages to get Sam and Tucker to the mirror gateway, where he proves himself to be Danny. Using trickery, the trio lure Sidney into his own mirror. He and Danny regain their own bodies after a fight. Sidney eventually gains freedom from his ghostly prison and a bit of popularity within the Ghost Zone.

==== Skulker ====
Skulker (voiced by Mathew St. Patrick and later Kevin Michael Richardson) is a small ghost who wields a robotic suit and hunts rare and unusual ghosts. Having a sense of loyalty, he often works for Vlad Plasmius and occasionally serves as a "leader" and spokesperson for the ghosts.

==== Penelope Spectra ====
Penelope Spectra (voiced by Tara Strong) is a sadistic shadowy female ghost who strives to retain a youthful and beautiful appearance. To do so, she often targets teenagers and through elaborate plans, slowly sucks them dry of their positive emotions like a kind of psychic vampire, using their worst fears and anxieties to humiliate and drain them, leaving them depressed and apathetic while she absorbs their energy to strengthen herself.

==== Terminatra ====
Terminatra (voiced by Grey DeLisle) is one of the fictional characters from the film Trinity of Doom (a parody of Freddy vs. Jason). Terminatra is a spoof of the Terminator. Terminatra is brought to life by Desiree after Sam wished unknowingly that something bad should happen to Paulina before her party.

==== Nicolai Technus ====

Nicolai Technus (voiced by Rob Paulsen) is the self-proclaimed "Ghost Master of Science and Electrical Technology". He has the ability to control and merge with technology and manipulate electricity. Technus is a boisterous genius mad scientist ghost who commonly shouts his name and goals, as well as blabber long speeches quite loudly (a common flaw which Danny exploits). Technus is also known for his use of out-dated slang, such as "hip" and "far out". He occasionally speaks in third-person when referring to himself. Technus later gains himself an upgrade after absorbing large amounts of electrical energy, rendering himself with a new look and upgraded ghostly form referred to as "Technus 2.0".

==== Undergrowth ====
Undergrowth (voiced by Mark Hamill) is a ghost who can control plants. Upset that his beloved nature has been torn down by human hands, he overtakes Amity Park, turns it into his own horticulture lair and possesses Sam, turning her into his "daughter" and the mother to his plants. Undergrowth is defeated by Danny after he masters his ice powers with the help of Frostbite and uses them to freeze him out of Amity Park.

==== Vlad Masters / Vlad Plasmius ====
Vlad Masters, or Vlad Plasmius, (voiced by Martin Mull in the series and Nicktoons Unite!, Trevor Devall in Nickelodeon All-Star Brawl 2), is the archenemy of Danny. Vlad is a powerful half-ghost businessman and scientist whose twenty years of experience constantly one-up Danny's ghostly abilities. Serving as the main antagonist in the series, he vows to destroy Jack for giving him his ghost powers, which in the process injured him terribly and put him in the hospital for seven years with a fatal condition known as "Ecto Acne". He wrongfully blamed this for ruining his life; however, it was his own evil plots that were the real product of his own personality flaws and refusal to accept that Maddie would never love him (the three had been classmates at the University of Wisconsin-Madison). He also has goals to obtain Danny as his son and, later, torment him after one too many rejections.

Vlad was originally envisioned as a vampire before the developers declared it "too occult". Vlad's love for the Green Bay Packers and their linebacker Ray Nitschke is attributed and added due to series producer and writer Steve Marmel's fondness for them.

==== Vortex ====
Vortex (voiced by Dave Boat) is a psychotic ghost with the power to control the weather, a gift he considers to be an art form. He finds Earth to be a meaningless planet, and has wrought havoc on it throughout the ages. On a trial by the Observants for his reckless behavior, Vortex is freed by Vlad who used him to his own services. However, Vortex rebels against Vlad and conjures up violent weather all over the world until Danny defeats him, gaining and losing Vortex's climate control powers. Vortex can generate and control storms, and the weather in general, from creating typhoons to making heat waves hot enough to melt walls, floods and winds cold enough to freeze streets in ice.

==== Walker ====
Walker (voiced by James Arnold Taylor) is a strict vigilante and warden who runs the prison of the Ghost Zone. He enjoys law and order and often commands with an iron fist; whoever so much as disobeys one rule from his law and rule book is in giant trouble. To justify his cause, he often makes up the rule as he abides by them and is not above using dirty measures to keep the Ghost Zone clean and corruption-free.

==== Youngblood ====
Youngblood (voiced by Taylor Lautner) is a ghost with the appearance of a young child. Obnoxious and childish, he can only be seen by children. Despite his looks, Youngblood is a keen commander and skilled in battle. A ruthless prankster, Youngblood dresses up in various costumes, but most commonly portrays a pirate.

=== Human villains ===
==== Freakshow ====
Freakshow (voiced by Jon Cryer) is the ringmaster of the Circus Gothica, as well as the only fully human villain in the series. An entertainer for the Gothic audience, Freakshow is eccentric, full of showmanship and creativity. His family have used ghosts for their circus for years. Unsatisfied with just a showman's life, Freakshow uses a magic scepter to control ghosts and order them to steal goods.

==== The Guys in White ====
The Guys in White are a secret governmental organization dedicated to eliminating ghosts and other paranormal beings. It consists of Operative K (voiced by Dee Bradley Baker), Operative O (voiced by S. Scott Bullock), Operative L (voiced by Jim Ward), and Operative M (voiced by Kevin Michael Richardson), and is led by Agent Alpha (voiced by S. Scott Bullock). The group is a parody of the eponymous organization from the Men in Black franchise.

==== Masters' Blasters ====
Vid, Thrash, and Download (voiced by Colleen O'Shaughnessey, Dee Bradley Baker, and Rob Paulsen) are a trio of teen ghost hunters, created by Vlad to shame Danny and dethrone him as resident savior of Amity Park. They embodied everything that is radical and are often greedy, frequently demanding payment for their services from citizens. The Blasters are later betrayed by Vlad when he reveals himself to be a half-ghost.

==== Valerie Gray ====
Valerie in her first generation battle suit

Valerie Gray (voiced by Grey DeLisle and later Cree Summer) is a popular shallow girl whose life takes a turn for the worse when accidents caused by Cujo the ghost dog cost her father his job. Valerie vowed revenge against all ghosts for ruining her life after being given a ghost hunting suit and gears from Vlad. Vlad employs her to do his bidding until she finds out that Vlad was a half-ghost and that he was manipulating her. She is hot-tempered, which often clouds her judgment, but slowly starts to realize a world beyond the superficial. She briefly strikes a romance with Danny Fenton, but clashes often with his alter-ego.

== Ghost allies ==
=== Clockwork ===
Clockwork (voiced by David Carradine in the series, Piotr Michael in Nickelodeon All-Star Brawl 2) is a ghost who controls and keeps the flow of time. He is calm, tricky, and all-knowing. When asked by the Observants to kill Danny Fenton to prevent a future where his evil self wrecks the planet, Clockwork seemingly appears to be Danny's enemy. In reality, he is merely helping and urging him to make the right decisions so that he can prevent Danny's death by the Observants. Neutral, he does not fulfill every wish Danny desires, including altering past events. He only adjusts time as he sees fit, usually to teach Danny a lesson. He constantly changes his age and appearance from a child to adult to old man.

=== Cujo ===
The Ghost Dog, nicknamed "Cujo", (voiced by S. Scott Bullock), is a playful ghost puppy. When angered, it can grow into a large, aggressive beast. In search for its squeaky toy, the ghost dog trashes the Axion Labs, costing Damon Gray, Valerie Gray's father, his job. This causes Valerie to vow a vendetta against all ghosts.

=== Dairy King ===
The Dairy King (voiced by S. Scott Bullock) is a ghost who used to live in Vlad Masters's mansion and now haunts it. The Dairy King is one of the first nice ghosts Danny meets, and all he wants is to be left alone.

=== Danielle "Dani" Phantom ===
Dani Phantom, also known as Danielle Phantom, (voiced by AnnaSophia Robb and later Krista Swan), is an imperfect clone of Danny Phantom, created by Vlad as a stepping stone to the perfect Danny clone. In her debut, Dani poses as Danny's cousin. Only one step behind him, Danielle's body is slowly-dissolving, but retains free will. She first works with Vlad until Danny convinces Danielle that she is nothing but a tool to Vlad. With that knowledge, she sides with Danny. She shares many of the same traits and interests as Danny, who serves as something of an older brother to her. In another episode, Danny and Valerie come to help her when she was captured by Vlad. She becomes stabilized by an invention Danny uses and after saying goodbye to them, flies off to parts unknown. The last time she is seen in the series is as part of the crowd of ghosts in "Phantom Planet". Butch Hartman stated that sometime after the events of "Phantom Planet", Danielle's existence and origins were revealed to the rest of the Fentons, who subsequently opted to adopt her, making her Jack and Maddie's youngest daughter and child, and Danny and Jazz's younger sister; Hartman has also stated that this would have been shown on-screen had the show gotten a fourth season.

=== Frostbite ===
Frostbite (voiced by Bob Joles) is a jovial yeti-like ghost. He lives in the Far Frozen with his people, where they worship Danny Phantom for his defeat over Pariah Dark. He serves as a mentor figure to Danny and ultimately teaches him how to hone his ice powers. His people hold the Infi-Map, a map that can find any natural Ghost Portals.

=== Pandora ===
Pandora (voiced by April Stewart) is the creator and owner of "Pandora's box". When Danny was powerless to stop the Box Ghost from creating havoc with the box, he entered her lair and asked her help in retrieving it back. She is a benevolent ghost who keeps the world less evil by keeping many malicious contents within her box, but can get aggressive when tampered with. She shares her name with the first woman from classical mythology.

=== Princess Dorathea ===
Princess Dora (voiced by Grey DeLisle and later Susan Blakeslee) is a princess whose magical amulet allows her to transform into a dragon. She is the younger sister of Prince Aragon. When she first emerged from the Ghost Zone, her despair over not being allowed to go the Princess ball by her mother causes her to transform. After battling Danny, Dorothea loses her amulet, which is acquired by Paulina and later Sam.

=== Wulf ===
Wulf (voiced by Dee Bradley Baker) is a werewolf-like ghost, constantly on the run from Walker as an escaped prisoner. He has the ability to go into both the Earth and the Ghost Zone at will by slashing through dimensions with his claws. Wulf retains a loyal streak and is quick to befriend and trust Danny when he helps him.

== Other ghosts ==
=== Klemper ===
Klemper (voiced by S. Scott Bullock) is a ghost seen in pajamas. He is desperate to get a friend, and continually asks "Will you be my friend?" If the subject denies him this, he turns violent and often uses an ice attack on the subject.

=== The Observants ===
The Observants (voiced by Dee Bradley Baker and Phil Morris) are a group of one-eyed ghost beings whose job is to observe the sequence of events in time. They are confined to viewing time in a linear manner, whereas their colleague Clockwork can view time in a multifaceted manner. In their first appearance, they are seen convincing Clockwork to prevent the creation of Dark Danny in the future, which they see as an inevitable event in their view of time, by destroying Danny Phantom in the present. Clockwork sidesteps this plan and helps Danny to destroy his evil self. They are also seen placing Vortex on trial in a later episode.

== Recurring humans ==
- Mr. Lancer (voiced by Ron Perlman) is the vice-principal and English, Math, Science and History teacher of Casper High. He is a strict and stern teacher who tends to call out Danny because of his average grades and his lackluster interest in his job, but is also a well-meaning man who tries to make sure all his students do their best. Lancer has a humorous habit of shouting out book titles when he is shocked or surprised in place of swear words.
- Dash Baxter (voiced by S. Scott Bullock) is the most popular boy in Casper High School. The star football quarterback and a basketball player, he often gets free leeway from the authorities at school due to his winning streak. However, Dash is a bully who frequently picks on Danny and anyone else smaller and less popular than himself. As an act of irony, his role model is Danny Phantom.
- Paulina (voiced by Maria Canals-Barrera) is a 15-year-old Hispanic-American cheerleader and the most popular girl at Casper High School as well as Danny's crush for most of the series. She is beautiful yet self-centered, devious, and as Sam puts it, "a dime a dozen". Paulina has a crush on Danny Phantom after he saved her, but could not care less for his alter ego, who had a crush on her during the first half of the series.
- Kwan (voiced by Dat Phan and later James Sie) is an Asian-American football player and Dash's best friend. Though he is popular and bullies the lesser known students as much as Dash, Kwan is a bit more reluctant. He possibly only wanted popularity so that he can feel a sense of belonging.
- Star (voiced by Grey DeLisle and later Tara Strong) is another popular girl and cheerleader at Casper High who is Kwan's girlfriend and Paulina's best friend and also serves as her "satellite", constantly orbiting around her.
- Mikey (voiced by Dee Bradley Baker) is a small nerd in Casper High who is often the victim of the popular boys' bullying.
- Nathan (voiced by Dee Bradley Baker) is another small nerd who is interested in Valerie. He was renamed Lester in “Claw of the Wild”.
- Jeremy (voiced by S. Scott Bullock) and Pamela "Pam" Manson (voiced by Laraine Newman) are Sam's parents and the overall antithesis of their daughter, being a pair of super-optimistic socialites. They possess an enormous disdain of Sam's nonconformity and constantly try to steer her away from it. The Mansons have a rivalry with the Fenton parents.
- Damon Gray (voiced by Phil Morris) is Valerie's father and faithful employee of Axion Labs until he was briefly fired. He is a calm, patient man who adores his daughter, but once he finds out about it, does not approve of her ghost fighting job.
- Tiffany Snow (voiced by Tara Strong) is a reporter who remains cheery despite the often depressing news she delivers.
- Lance Thunder (voiced by Dee Bradley Baker) is a weatherman who has reported about ghosts several times. He constantly fidgets over his hair, and when he thinks he is off the air, argues with the fact that he has to be the one to report.
- Principal Ishiyama (voiced by June Angela) is the Asian-American female principal of Casper High.
