= Nickelodeon All-Star Brawl 2 =

2023 video game

- Cover art featuring a selection of the game's playable characters and antagonist Vlad Plasmius (Note: Characters pictured include (clockwise from top): Vlad, SpongeBob, Korra, Lucy, Raphael, Patrick, April, Rocko, Jenny, Aang, Danny, Garfield, and Nigel.)
- Developer: Fair Play Labs
- Publisher: GameMill Entertainment
- Directors: Diego Rodriguez; Sergio Chacón
- Designer: Leopoldo Arguello Marsal
- Artist: Diego Hernández Cruz
- Composers: Carlos Aguilar; Ivan Barquero
- Series: Nickelodeon Super Brawl
- Engine: Unity
- Platforms: Nintendo Switch; PlayStation 4; PlayStation 5; Windows; Xbox One; Xbox Series X/S
- Release: November 7, 2023
- Genre: Fighting
- Modes: Single-player, multiplayer

Nickelodeon All-Star Brawl 2 is a 2023 crossover fighting game developed by Fair Play Labs and published by GameMill Entertainment. It is the sequel to Nickelodeon All-Star Brawl (2021) and part of the Nickelodeon Super Brawl series. The game was released on November 7, 2023, for Nintendo Switch, PlayStation 4, PlayStation 5, Windows, Xbox One, and Xbox Series X/S.

== Gameplay ==
Two Rockos fight in front of the Technodrome from Teenage Mutant Ninja Turtles

Like the previous game, Nickelodeon All-Star Brawl 2 is a 2D platform fighter featuring characters from various Nickelodeon franchises. Gameplay has been updated from the previous entry, with all characters' movesets having been revised and given new horizontal attacks, and new mechanics being added such as aerial dodging and dodge rolling. During gameplay, a new "Slime Meter" can be built up by attacking opponents and used in different ways, such as powering up attacks, extending aerial recovery, performing attack cancels, pushing opponents away, and activating powerful character-specific super attacks.

A new single-player roguelike campaign has been added, in which players must stop Danny Phantom villain Vlad Plasmius from conquering the multiverse. Players start in the hub area, the "Timeless Stardial", where they can choose their character and interact with non-player characters to prepare for a run. When a run begins, players progress through nodes that each feature different challenges and special rules, including waves of enemies, platforming challenges, and boss battles. Players will receive free power-ups from non-player characters or purchase them using an orange blimp currency they earn during battle. These powerups will remain active for the remainder of the run; upon completion or defeat, the player's power-ups and blimps are discarded as they return to the Timeless Stardial. Players will also earn new playable characters by defeating them in battle, as well as green Slimy and purple Splat currencies, all of which are retained when a run concludes. Slimies can be spent on equippable perks that will grant the player additional benefits during a run, while Splat can be used to purchase additional slots for equipping perks, decorations for the Timeless Stardial, and upgrades for shops that expand their selection of purchasable items.

The game also features expanded arcade and training modes, new mini-games, and a boss rush mode. The game includes 26 stages, some of which feature selectable alternate layouts. In addition, support for cross-platform play has been added to the game's online multiplayer.

=== Playable characters ===
The game features 25 playable characters drawn from 17 Nickelodeon franchises, including 14 characters returning from the previous game. Four additional characters were released as post-launch downloadable content throughout 2024. New characters are marked in bold.

- Aang (Avatar: The Last Airbender)
- **Angry Beavers** (The Angry Beavers)
- April (Teenage Mutant Ninja Turtles)
- **Azula** (Avatar: The Last Airbender)
- Danny Phantom (Danny Phantom)
- **Donatello** (Teenage Mutant Ninja Turtles)
- **El Tigre** (El Tigre: The Adventures of Manny Rivera)
- **Ember** (Danny Phantom)
- Garfield (Garfield)
- **Gerald** (Hey Arnold!)
- **Grandma Gertie** (Hey Arnold!)
- **Iroh** (Note: Downloadable content) (Avatar: The Last Airbender)
- Jenny Wakeman (My Life as a Teenage Robot)
- **Jimmy Neutron** (Jimmy Neutron)
- Korra (The Legend of Korra)
- Lucy Loud (The Loud House)
- **Mecha Plankton** (SpongeBob SquarePants)
- **Mr. Krabs** (SpongeBob SquarePants)
- Nigel (The Wild Thornberrys)
- Patrick (SpongeBob SquarePants)
- **Raphael** (Teenage Mutant Ninja Turtles)
- Ren & Stimpy (The Ren & Stimpy Show)
- Reptar (Rugrats)
- Rocko (Rocko's Modern Life)
- **Rocksteady** (Teenage Mutant Ninja Turtles)
- SpongeBob (SpongeBob SquarePants)
- **Squidward** (SpongeBob SquarePants)
- Zim (Invader Zim)
- **Zuko** (Avatar: The Last Airbender)

== Plot ==
SpongeBob SquarePants and Patrick Star are blowing bubbles when a strange portal appears and pulls Patrick in. Another portal opens and a strange voice tells SpongeBob to enter it to save Patrick, prompting him to jump in. After passing through several different worlds, SpongeBob finds Patrick, who becomes enraged and attacks him. SpongeBob subdues Patrick, returning him to normal, and they are taken to a pocket dimension called the Timeless Stardial, where they meet the one who summoned SpongeBob, Clockwork. Clockwork explains that Vlad Plasmius has gained the power to mind control other beings, and now seeks to gain control of everyone from every universe. Clockwork grants the heroes a time medallion, which will allow him to rewind time should they fall in battle, and sends them to free more potential allies from Vlad's control.

After traveling through many worlds, freeing others under Vlad's control along the way, and fighting several villains, the heroes confront and defeat Vlad, but he reveals himself to be only a clone, and the universe starts to tear apart. After Clockwork rewinds time and returns the heroes to the Timeless Stardial, he explains that he purposefully hid the knowledge that the heroes were fighting a clone so that they could become strong enough to face the real Vlad. After the heroes encounter and defeat the actual Vlad, he becomes enraged and forces his mind control machine to take control of everyone in the universe. However, this causes the machine to malfunction, which begins to tear the universe apart once again. Clockwork rewinds time to prevent this and reveals that Vlad's plan will always fail and lead to the end of the universe. Dr. Wakeman creates an energy dampener that will be able to disable Vlad's machine. Upon re-encountering Vlad, the hero uses the dampener to disable the machine. Enraged, Vlad fights the heroes one last time, but is defeated and captured by Clockwork. The universe nevertheless begins collapsing once more.

The heroes are transported back to the Timeless Stardial, where Clockwork has gone missing. Vlad, who is now trapped there as well, cryptically reveals that the heroes made a mistake in stopping him, and Master Splinter hypothesizes that Clockwork may have had ulterior intentions for refusing to return the displaced characters to their original worlds. The heroes travel across the universe to confront Clockwork, who has been corrupted by the effects of Vlad's machine. Clockwork reveals that he has grown fond of watching the universe fall apart repeatedly and warns the heroes not to defy him. The heroes eventually confront and defeat Clockwork in his lair, who reverts back to his original self. With Vlad's machine destroyed for good, Clockwork allows the heroes to return to their own worlds with no memories of the incident ever happening.

== Development and release ==
In June 2023, prior to its announcement, several images from Nickelodeon All-Star Brawl 2, including development screenshots and partial box art, were anonymously leaked online. The game was officially announced on July 27, 2023. The game's graphics were refined over its predecessor, and all characters feature full English voice-acting, a feature which was not added to its predecessor until several months after release. One week after the game's announcement, the full character roster was accidentally leaked via an Amazon retail listing.

In addition to the standard release, the game is also available in a digital-only Deluxe edition that includes a downloadable content season pass containing four additional characters, and an additional "Quickster" costume for SpongeBob. A separate digital Ultimate edition includes the content from the Deluxe edition, as well as an additional costume for each character. An additional "Elastic Waistband" costume for Patrick was available as a pre-order incentive.

Initially announced for release on November 3, 2023, the game was later pushed back to November 7, with physical copies released on December 1. Patrick's Elastic Waistband costume was also made available for free to all those who purchased the game digitally during the first week of release.

Nickelodeon All-Star Brawl 2 marked the debut of Jacqueline Grace Lopez as Korra, following Janet Varney's departure from the role. Per her behalf, Varney insisted a woman of color should take over the role, as her final time voicing the character was in Nickelodeon Kart Racers 3: Slime Speedway the previous year.

== Reception ==
Reception

Aggregate scores
Aggregator	Score
Metacritic	PS5: 78/100 (Note: Score based on 13 reviews); PC: 73/100 (Note: Score based on 12 reviews)
OpenCritic	71% (Note: Score based on 34 reviews)

Review scores
Publication	Score
Digital Trends	4/5
Game Informer	8/10
GameSpot	7/10
IGN	9/10
Nintendo Life	5/10
PCMag	4.0/5
Push Square	7/10
Shacknews	7/10
TechRadar	4/5

The PlayStation 5 version of Nickelodeon All-Star Brawl 2 received "generally favorable" reviews according to review aggregator website Metacritic; the Windows version received "mixed or average" reviews. On the aggregator OpenCritic, the game has a "Fair" approval rating. Reviewers praised the game as an overall improvement over its predecessor, although the game's performance was criticized, particularly for the Nintendo Switch version.

Accolades
Year	Ceremony	Category	Result	Ref.
2023	The Game Awards 2023	Best Fighting Game	Nominated	
2024	13th New York Game Awards	Central Park Children's Zoo Award for Best Kids Game	Nominated	
2024	27th Annual D.I.C.E. Awards	Fighting Game of the Year	Nominated	
