= Nickelodeon Super Brawl =

Nickelodeon video game series

- A logo from the 2014 update of Super Brawl 3, featuring some of the playable characters
- Genre: Fighting
- Developers: MP Game Studio (Super Brawl 1-2); Workinman (Super Brawl 3-4, World); Playsoft (Super Brawl Universe); Ludosity (All-Star Brawl); Fair Play Labs (All-Star Brawl and All-Star Brawl 2)
- Publishers: Nick.com (1-4, World); Playsoft (Super Brawl Universe); GameMill Entertainment (All-Star Brawl and All-Star Brawl 2)
- Platforms: Web browser (1-4, World); Mobile phone (Universe); Linux; Windows XP SP2+ or later; Mac OS X Tiger or later (only Jingle Brawl); Various consoles (All-Star Brawl and All-Star Brawl 2)
- First release: Jingle Brawl; December 26, 2009
- Latest release: Nickelodeon All-Star Brawl 2 November 7, 2023

Nickelodeon Super Brawl, or simply Nickelodeon Brawl, is a series of crossover fighting video games, featuring characters from various Nickelodeon animated television series. According to the team at Nick Games, the series follows the play style of "popular fighting games like Street Fighter, Mortal Kombat, Super Smash Bros., and Tekken, but with a comical twist."

The first five Super Brawl games were browser games available on Nickelodeon's website. After Nickelodeon removed its online games in 2018, the sixth game was instead released as a mobile app. A console game follow-up to Super Brawl, called Nickelodeon All-Star Brawl, was released in 2021. and a sequel, called Nickelodeon All-Star Brawl 2, was released in 2023.

In the original series of browser games, the most-played title was Super Brawl 3: Good vs. Evil, which garnered 40-45 million plays on Nick.com. Super Brawl 3 also won a Webby Award for Best Web Game in 2014.

== Games ==
- Jingle Brawl (later rebranded as Super Brawl) is the first game in the series, released on Nick.com on December 26, 2009 with a Christmas theme. The game was also updated with other seasonal themes, named Super Brawl Summer and Super Fall Brawl.
- Super Brawl 2 was released in December 2010. This game added a tag-team mode where two characters fight two others.
- Super Brawl 3: Good vs. Evil was released on March 24, 2013. It became one of the most-played games on Nick.com, with over 40 million sessions as of 2015. This game pits Nickelodeon heroes against villains and introduces "fans" (human helpers dressed like Nickelodeon characters who assist the player).
  - An April Fools' version called Super Brawl 3: Just Got Real was added in 2014, featuring photorealistic versions of a few characters.
- Super Brawl 4 (stylized as SUPER HERO BR4WL) was released in July 2015 and features superhero characters, including the franchise's first character from a live-action sitcom (Henry Hart from Henry Danger). A Halloween-themed update was added in October, called Scary Brawl.
- Super Brawl World was released in January 2017. It is the final online entry in the series.
- Super Brawl Universe was released as a mobile app in March 2019. Published by the Polish studio Playsoft, this game introduced the concept of color-coded classes, used to determine which character has advantage in a battle.
- All-Star Brawl was released as a console game in October 2021.
- All-Star Brawl 2 was released as a console game in November 2023.
