= List of Danny Phantom episodes =

Danny Phantom is an American animated superhero television series that aired on Nickelodeon from April 3, 2004 to August 24, 2007. The series follows 14-year-old Danny Fenton who, after an accident with an unpredictable portal between the human world and the supernatural "Ghost Zone", becomes half-ghost and frequently saves his town and the material world from ghost/spectral attacks. Danny also faces the typical challenges of a high school student while attempting to keep his ghost half a secret, except from his best friends, Sam Manson and Tucker Foley, and later his sister, Jazz. As the show progresses, his ghostly abilities continue to develop and grow much stronger, and he gradually learns to control them.

== Series overview ==
Season	Episodes	Originally released	
Season	Episodes	First released	Last released
1	20	April 3, 2004	June 17, 2005
2	20	June 24, 2005	June 9, 2006
3	13	October 9, 2006	August 24, 2007

== Episodes ==
=== Season 1 (2004–05) ===
No. overall	No. in season	Title	Directed by	Written by	Storyboard by	Original release date	Prod. code
1	1	"Mystery Meat"	Butch Hartman	Butch Hartman & Mark Banker & Steve Marmel	Erik Wiese, Ray Angrum, & Butch Hartman	April 3, 2004	001
A month has passed since Danny Fenton's exposure to his parents' Ghost Portal turned him into a human-ghost hybrid. When his goth friend Sam changes the lunch menu to ultra-recycle vegetarian, the vengeful ghost/meat monster of the previous Casper High School lunch lady reanimates to bring meat justice back to the high school. Danny must channel his newfound powers into fighting this ghost while keeping them a secret from everybody except for his two best friends. Guest star: Patricia Heaton as the Lunch Lady Ghost
2	2	"Parental Bonding"	Wincat Alcala & Sean Dempsey & Butch Hartman	Story by : Stephen Sustarsic & David Silverman; Written by : Steve Marmel & Sib Ventress	Erik Wiese & Ray Angrum	April 9, 2004	003
Danny has a major crush on the school's most beautiful girl, Paulina. He asks her to go to the big dance with him by giving her an amulet he found. When his still-unpredictable ghost abilities cause problems at school, Mr. Lancer requests a parent-teacher conference with his dad. Using his newfound ability to "overshadow" or inhabit another's body, he talks his way out of trouble in his dad's body. More trouble awaits at the dance, however, when it turns out that the amulet he gave Paulina turns anybody into a huge ghost dragon when angered.
3	3	"One of a Kind"	Wincat Alcala & Butch Hartman	Butch Hartman & Mark Banker & Steve Marmel	Erik Wiese, Ray Angrum, & Butch Hartman	April 9, 2004	002
Up all night fighting the Box Ghost, Danny attracts the attention of a Ghost Hunter named Skulker, who vows to capture Danny Phantom, as he is rare and unique. The next day, Danny receives a D on his biology test, and Sam suggests that he earn extra credit by doing a report on the purpleback gorilla. To help Danny manage his time, Tucker puts Danny's schedule into his PDA. In an attempt to capture Danny, Skulker sees Tucker's PDA and uses it to upgrade his armor. His power increases, but he becomes bound to Danny's schedule. Will Danny manage to evade capture by a ghostly villain and save his biology grade? Guest star: Mathew St. Patrick as Skulker
4	4	"Attack of the Killer Garage Sale"	Wincat Alcala, Richard Bowman & Butch Hartman	Story by : Steve Marmel; Written by : Sib Ventress	Erik Wiese, Ray Angrum, & Lane Lueras	April 16, 2004	004
Danny finds himself finally part of the "in crowd" at Casper High, but his newfound popularity strains his friendship with Sam and Tucker. Because the lab and household junk he sells to pay for his cool new outfit has been infused with a spectral influence, Technus, Master of All Things Electronic, is on the loose. It is up to Danny to save the city, make it to the party in time, and reconcile with Sam and Tucker.
5	5	"Splitting Images"	Wincat Alcala, Richard Bowman & Butch Hartman	Story by : Butch Hartman & Steve Marmel; Written by : Marty Isenberg	Erik Wiese, Chris Graham, Ray Angrum, & Lane Lueras	April 23, 2004	005
After the Box Ghost destroys Danny's locker, he is assigned a new one: Locker 724. Everyone is afraid of that locker, but Danny does not know why. Meanwhile, Danny decides to get some "ghostly getback" on the bullies in school. It is later revealed that the former owner of his locker in the 1950s, Sidney Poindexter, was the main bully victim in his time. He punishes Danny for his actions by swapping bodies and dimensions with him, trapping Danny in a mirror world of his high school. Guest star: Peter MacNicol as Sidney Poindexter
6	6	"What You Want"	Wincat Alcala & Rick Bowman & Butch Hartman	Written by : Sib Ventress; Story by : Steve Marmel	Erik Wiese, Chris Graham, & Ray Angrum	April 30, 2004	006
When a little girl's balloon string pulls an ancient mystical lamp to the ground, the lamp breaks and releases Desiree, a wishing ghost who grants every wish she hears but brings chaos with her magic. Thanks to a new ghost power, Danny stops her, but when Tucker's growing envy of Danny's powers drives him to wish for ghostly abilities, Desiree grants his wish. Initially annoyed by Tucker's new abilities, Danny must act quickly when he learns Tucker's envy will transform him into the strongest ghost boy ever. Will Danny reverse Desiree's wish-granting spell before it's too late for his best friend? Guest star: Peri Gilpin as Desiree
7	7	"Bitter Reunions"	Wincat Alcala & Juli Hashiguchi & Butch Hartman	Story by : Steve Marmel; Written by : Sib Ventress & Steve Marmel	Chris Graham & Ray Angrum	May 7, 2004	007
Jack brings his entire family to Wisconsin for his college reunion hosted by his old friend, Vlad Masters. While it's strange enough that Danny encounters ghosts on his vacation, what he learns about Vlad proves even more surprising: Vlad has hated Jack ever since Jack caused an accident in college— an accident that left him half-ghost, too. He has also tried to steal Maddie, the lost love of his life, away from Jack. After rendering Danny Phantom unconscious in a fight, Vlad sees Danny transform back into Danny Fenton and learns that his enemy's son shares a similar ghostly secret. With 20 years more experience with his ghost powers and motivated by a hatred for Jack, Vlad becomes Danny's archenemy. Guest stars: Martin Mull as Vlad and Mathew St. Patrick as Skulker
8	8	"Prisoners of Love"	Wincat Alcala & Juli Hashiguchi & Butch Hartman	Story by : Steve Marmel; Written by : Marty Isenberg	Erik Wiese & Wincat Alcala	May 14, 2004	008
Already afraid that his parents might get divorced, Danny accidentally knocks Jack's wedding anniversary gift to Maddie into the Ghost Zone. Determined to get it back, Danny ventures into the Ghost Zone for the first time. However, he is caught by a ghost warden, Walker, who makes up rules to retain order in his section of the Ghost Zone. Sentenced to 1,000 years in the Ghost Zone Prison, Danny is locked up alongside many of his ghostly enemies he has fought and sent back to the Ghost Zone. Luckily, he manages to persuade them to work with him to bust out of the prison. As the other ghosts escape, he returns to the prison cell to retrieve the gift and discovers that humans cannot be hurt by ghosts in the Ghost Zone, because in the Ghost Zone, humans are the ghosts. Guest Star: Matthew St. Patrick as Skulker Note: Starting with this episode, the Lunch Lady Ghost is now voiced by Kath Soucie for the remainder of the series.
9	9	"My Brother's Keeper"	Wincat Alcala & Juli Hashiguchi & Butch Hartman	Story by : Steve Marmel; Written by : Sib Ventress	Ray Angrum & Chris Graham	June 18, 2004	009
A new guidance counsellor depresses most of the students in Casper High School. While outwardly peppy and spirited, she is a ghost feeding on the students' misery to remain perpetually young. Jazz attempts to investigate Danny's recent changes in personality. He attempts to elude her, but Jazz accidentally witnesses Danny transform into his ghost form. Jazz keeps his secret and waits until he is ready to tell her.
10	10	"Shades of Gray"	Wincat Alcala, Julie Hashiguchi & Butch Hartman	Story by : Steve Marmel; Additional credits : Sib Ventress	Ian Graham & Eric Wiese	September 24, 2004	010
Danny has difficulty with a ghost dog, and every time it appears, it causes trouble. Within the Axion building, the ghost dog goes out of control, and both Danny Phantom and the building's security system designed by the father of Valerie Gray, a rich and popular yet less-than-friendly girl from school, proves unable to stop the ghost dog from destroying the lab. As Valerie's life turns upside down because of Danny Phantom, a "generous benefactor" (revealed to be Vlad Masters/Vlad Plasmius himself) helps Valerie exact revenge on Danny Phantom by turning her into a professional ghost hunter.
11	11	"Fanning the Flames"	Wincat Alcala, Juli Hashiguchi & Butch Hartman	Story by : Steve Marmel; Additional credits : Marty Isenberg	Ray Angrum & Chris Graham	October 8, 2004	011
A recently popular singer named Ember McLain magically enchants and charms teenage audiences with her hypnotic song. When Danny challenges her, she musically hypnotizes him with a "love song." Now infatuated with Sam, Danny cannot focus on Ember and Sam must find a way to break his heart to get him fighting fit again. Guest Star: Tara Strong as Ember McLain and Robbyn Kirmssé as Ember's Singing voice
12	12	"Teacher of the Year"	Wincat Alcala, Juli Hashiguchi & Butch Hartman	Story by : Steve Marmel; Written by : Sib Ventress	Ian Graham, Erik Wiese, & Butch Hartman	October 15, 2004	012
Danny and Tucker become obsessed with an online game. As a result, Danny does not get enough sleep and fails a test that accounts for 25% of their marks. Mr. Lancer decides to give him another chance by letting him retake his test, but when Technus escapes and tries to take over the world by using his ghost powers in the game, Danny must pass his test quickly. After studying with Mr. Lancer and taking the test again, he manages to pass with a 91% and returns to the game. In order to defeat Technus, he decides to use his ghost powers in the game, too, and he quickly catches up with Sam and Tucker in the game. The three of them successfully trap Technus in a glitch in the game before Mr. Lancer stops them in his own online game.
13	13	"Fright Night"	Wincat Alcala, Juli Hashiguchi & Butch Hartman	Story by : Steve Marmel; Written by : Marty Isenberg	Ray Angrum, Chris Graham, Ian Graham, & Butch Hartman	October 29, 2004	014
When he catches Danny and Dash fighting at school, Mr. Lancer offers them a chance to avoid detention by competing in a haunted house contest instead of giving them detention with Danny and Dash making a bet on who will win. When Danny feels he is losing, he steals the sword of the Fright Knight, the ghost spirit of Halloween, in an attempt to make his haunted house scarier. However, danger arises when the Fright Knight awakens and terrorizes Amity Park. Guest star: Michael Dorn as Fright Knight
14	14	"13"	Wincat Alcala, Juli Hashiguchi & Butch Hartman	Story by : Steve Marmel; Written by : Sib Ventress & Marty Isenberg	Chris Graham & Ray Angrum	November 5, 2004	013
Jazz falls for a biker named Johnny 13, and he tries to convince her to go steady with him swiftly. Unbeknownst to her, he is a ghost planning to use her body to contain the spirit of his girlfriend, Kitty. He nearly succeeds, but Danny stops him after becoming suspicious of Jazz's new boyfriend and sends him back to the Ghost Zone. Meanwhile, Tucker tries to change his image and ends up being labelled "Bad Luck Tuck," unknowingly being the inadvertent target of Johnny's bad luck Shadow. Guest stars: William Baldwin as Johnny 13 and Chynna Phillips as Kitty
15	15	"Public Enemies"	Wincat Alcala, Juli Hashiguchi & Butch Hartman	Story by : Steve Marmel; Written by : Sib Ventress & Steve Marmel	Ray Angrum, Chris Graham, Dave Bullock, Ian Graham, & Bob Boyle	February 4, 2005	015
The town of Amity Park is thrown into chaos by the town's first mass invasion of ghosts. It's all part of the plan by Ghost Zone's top sheriff, Walker, to capture and incarcerate Danny Phantom. At first Danny battles, then befriends, a hulking ghost named Wulf. Walker and his goons overshadow most of the influential people in Danny's city. While eluding constant attacks from his ghost-fighting parents, Danny defeats Walker and restores calm in the city. However, Walker's actions and lies damage Danny's reputation in the public sphere, and Danny earns the title of "Public Ghost Enemy #1" in the process.
16	16	"Lucky in Love"	Ken Bruce, Gary Conrad & Butch Hartman	Sib Ventress	Wincat Alcala, Ray Angrum, Shawn Murray, Dave Thomas, & Butch Hartman	February 11, 2005	017
When Paulina sees Danny transform into his ghostly alter-ego, he fears that she will tell everyone, but not only does Paulina agree to keep Danny's secret, she becomes his girlfriend! Danny does not know Kitty (Johnny 13's girlfriend) has overshadowed Paulina in an attempt to make Johnny jealous after their fight. If Danny ruins Kitty's plans by turning her down, she will, as Paulina, tell the entire town that he is the Ghost Boy. Guest stars: William Baldwin as Johnny 13 and Chynna Phillips as Kitty
17	17	"Maternal Instinct"	Gary Conrad & Juli Hashiguchi & Butch Hartman	Sib Ventress	Wincat Alcala, Ray Angrum, Chris Graham, & Butch Hartman	February 18, 2005	016
In an attempt to bond with her distant son, Maddie takes Danny to a science symposium in Florida. However, the symposium proves a ruse by Vlad Masters to convince Danny and Maddie to stay with him and abandon Jack. Vlad also launches a ghost attack on Fenton Works, hoping to eliminate Jack. Meanwhile, Jack tries to bond with Jazz, who claims she wants nothing to do with ghosts but turns out to be a great ghost hunter after all. Guest star: Martin Mull as Vlad
18	18	"Life Lessons"	Ken Bruce, Gary Conrad & Butch Hartman	Marty Isenberg	Wincat Alcala, Ray Angrum, Shawn Murray, & Butch Hartman	February 25, 2005	018
Danny and Valerie are forced to work together by watching a child-like flour sack for health class, but neither of them demonstrate willingness to help the other. After watching both Danny Phantom and the ghost hunter (Valerie) fighting, Skulker wonders which one is a more worthy prize. He handcuffs them together on his island and hunts them, holding the sack as ransom. Note: Skulker is now voiced by Kevin Michael Richardson for the remainder of the series.
19	19	"The Million Dollar Ghost"	Ken Bruce, Gary Conrad & Butch Hartman	Sib Ventress	Wincat Alcala, Ray Angrum, Shawn Murray, Fred Reyes, & Butch Hartman	June 3, 2005	019
When Vlad's Ghost Portal (as well as his mansion) is destroyed, he places a million dollar mark to hunt down the legendary ghost boy, Danny Phantom, so he can sneakily try and steal the Fenton Portal. Many hired ghost hunters are parodies of other mystery shows, as Men in Black and Scooby-Doo are paralleled as teams bent on capturing Danny for Vlad. Guest star: Martin Mull as Vlad
20	20	"Control Freaks"	Ken Bruce, Gary Conrad & Butch Hartman	Marty Isenberg	Wincat Alcala, Ray Angrum, Shawn Murray, & Butch Hartman	June 17, 2005	020
Ringmaster Freakshow arrives at Amity Park with his attraction, "Circus Gothica." His family heirloom, a ghost hypnotic, prompts Danny to join his circus and do his evil bidding. Guest star: Jon Cryer as Freakshow

=== Season 2 (2005–06) ===
No. overall	No. in season	Title	Directed by	Written by	Storyboard by	Original release date	Prod. code
21	1	"Memory Blank"	Ken Bruce, Gary Conrad & Butch Hartman	Steve Marmel	Wincat Alcala, Sam Bullock, Fred Reyes, Shawn Murray, & Butch Hartman	June 24, 2005	021
Danny and Sam get into a fight and Sam wishes she never met him, prompting Desiree to return and grant her wish, leaving Sam to witness a world without Danny Phantom. Guest Star: Peri Gilpin as Desiree
22	2	"Doctor's Disorders"	Wincat Alcala, Kevin Petrilak & Butch Hartman	Sib Ventress	Wincat Alcala, Ben Balistreri, Lothell Jones, Robb Pratt, Fred Reyes, & Butch Hartman	July 15, 2005	022
Ghost bugs invade every kid in Casper High causing them to exhibit ghostly powers that go awry. When they are all sent to the local hospital for quarantine, Danny and Tucker (who has a case of nosocomephobia) investigate the matters behind this.
23	3	"Pirate Radio"	Wincat Alcala, Kevin Petrilak & Butch Hartman	Marty Isenberg	Ray Angrum, Ben Balistreri, Shannon Denton, & Butch Hartman	July 22, 2005	023
Danny encounters a bratty ghost-pirate boy named Youngblood, who has teamed up with the siren-like ghost girl Ember, to kidnap all the adults in Amity Park via Ember's hypnotically enchanted music. Guest star: Taylor Lautner as Youngblood
24	4	"Reign Storm"	Wincat Alcala, Kevin Petrilak & Butch Hartman	Steve Marmel	Ray Angrum, Ben Balistreri, Shannon Denton, Robb Pratt, Fred Reyes, & Butch Hartman	July 29, 2005	024-025
25	5	"Reign Storm"	Wincat Alcala, Kevin Petrilak & Butch Hartman	Steve Marmel	Ray Angrum, Ben Balistreri, Shannon Denton, Robb Pratt, Fred Reyes, & Butch Hartman	July 29, 2005	024-025
Vlad Plasmius places the entire town of Amity Park in jeopardy when he accidentally releases the evil Ghost King, Pariah Dark, who invades both the ghost and mortal worlds. Even worse, all of the Ghost Zone residents flee their homes out of fear of the Ghost King and his armies, and Vlad is hiding out from the Ghost King in the Fenton Household. In order to combat this growing threat, Danny must team up with Vlad and several other foes to work side by side to stop the King of All Ghosts. Meanwhile, Valerie also fights alongside Danny as she grows feelings for him as well In this episode, Danny Phantom verifies his ghost name to the people of Amity Park.: This is 49 minutes long, being two episodes combined.; Guest stars: Brian Cox as Pariah Dark, Michael Dorn as The Fright Knight, Peter MacNicol as Sidney Poindexter and Martin Mull as Vlad Masters
26	6	"Identity Crisis"	Wincat Alcala, Kevin Petrilak & Butch Hartman	Marty Isenberg	Ben Balistreri, Fred Reyes, & Butch Hartman	September 23, 2005	026
Danny desires a separation between his fun and superhero lives. Using the Fenton Ghostcatcher, Danny splits himself in half and attempts to defeat Technus while spending time with Sam and Tucker.
27	7	"The Fenton Menace"	Wincat Alcala, Kevin Petrilak & Butch Hartman	Marty Isenberg	Ray Angrum, Robb Pratt, & Butch Hartman	October 7, 2005	027
As Youngblood continues to torment Danny, appearing as if Danny is fighting an invisible enemy and going crazy, Jazz decides a Fenton family vacation with no ghost hunting is the solution. Guest Star: Taylor Lautner as Youngblood
28	8	"The Ultimate Enemy!"	Wincat Alcala, Kevin Petrilak & Butch Hartman	Story by : Steve Marmel; Written by : Marty Isenberg, Steve Marmel & Sib Ventress	Ray Angrum, Ben Balistreri, Chris Graham, Shaunt Nigoghossian, Robb Pratt, Fred Reyes, & Butch Hartman	September 16, 2005	028-029
29	9	"The Ultimate Enemy!"	Wincat Alcala, Kevin Petrilak & Butch Hartman	Story by : Steve Marmel; Written by : Marty Isenberg, Steve Marmel & Sib Ventress	Ray Angrum, Ben Balistreri, Chris Graham, Shaunt Nigoghossian, Robb Pratt, Fred Reyes, & Butch Hartman	September 16, 2005	028-029
Danny is desperate to pass a standardized test called the C.A.T. After a fight with a ghost from the future sent by the mysterious Clockwork puts the answers to the C.A.T. in his hands, he decides to cheat in hopes of securing an easy pass to a great future. After fighting another ghost from the future, he, Sam, and Tucker discover that Danny cheating leads to a horrible future where after the death of his family and friends, Danny grows up to be Dark Danny, the evilest and most powerful ghost on the planet who terrorizes the world. Upon discovering Clockwork's interference, Dark Danny tries to make sure Danny's horrible future comes to pass by trapping Danny in his timeline, while he returns to 14 year old Danny's time. To save his friends, family, and future, Danny must escape back to his timeline with the help of the future version of Vlad (who is indirectly responsible for Dark Danny's creation), and battle the evil Dark Danny to save his family, friends, future, and himself, with the help of a mysterious ghost named Clockwork. At the end of the episode, Danny finds out Jazz knows he is part ghost.: This is 49 minutes long, being two episodes combined.; Guest stars: Eric Roberts as Dark Danny/Dan Phantom, David Carradine as Clockwork, Michael Dorn as The Fright Knight of the future, William Baldwin as Johnny 13 of the future, and Martin Mull as Vlad Masters of the future
30	10	"The Fright Before Christmas!"	Wincat Alcala, Kevin Petrilak & Butch Hartman	Marty Isenberg, Sib Ventress & Steve Marmel	Ben Balistreri, Fred Reyes, Shaunt Nigoghossian, & Butch Hartman	December 6, 2005	030
Thanks to his parents constant fighting over Santa's existence and subsequently causing chaos during Christmas, Danny has become a real Grinch when it comes to the holidays. But it gets a lot harder when he accidentally destroys the Ghost Writer's newly-finished Christmas-based story and refuses to apologize, causing the Ghost Writer to trap him in another story to teach him a lesson in Christmas spirit. Guest star: Will Arnett as the Ghost Writer
31	11	"Secret Weapons"	Wincat Alcala, Kevin Petrilak & Butch Hartman	Story by : Steve Marmel; Written by : Marty Isenberg	Ray Angrum, Robb Pratt, Shaunt Nigoghossian, & Butch Hartman	December 9, 2005	031
Now that Jazz is a member of "Team Phantom," she tries her hardest to help Danny capture ghosts but often accidentally hinders his success. When her determination to help leads her to hack into Danny's computer, he cannot take it anymore and tells her she’s a "lousy ghost hunter, an overbearing sister and an annoying, obnoxious know-it-all who has no respect for her brother's privacy," all in front of eavesdropping schoolmates. Jazz runs off to Vlad Masters with a plan.
32	12	"Flirting with Disaster"	Wincat Alcala, Kevin Petrilak & Butch Hartman	Story by : Marty Isenberg; Written by : Steve Marmel	Ben Balistreri, Robb Pratt, Fred Reyes, & Butch Hartman	January 13, 2006	032
Danny and Valerie's budding romance comes full-bloom when the two start dating, making Sam extremely jealous. Technus pushes the romance to keep Danny busy and enable his next technological plan for world conquest.
33	13	"Micro Management"	Wincat Alcala, Kevin Petrilak & Butch Hartman	Story by : Matt Wayne; Written by : Steve Marmel & Matt Wayne	Ray Angrum, Robb Pratt, Shaunt Nigoghossian, & Butch Hartman	January 27, 2006	033
Jack's newest invention accidentally shrinks both Danny and Dash, as well as Skulker, literally down to size. Because of this, Danny's powers slowly start to short out. He must make his way to the invention and make himself back to normal size before his secret is exposed to Dash.
34	14	"Beauty Marked"	Wincat Alcala, Kevin Petrilak & Butch Hartman	Marty Isenberg	Ben Balistreri, Fred Reyes, & Butch Hartman	February 24, 2006	034
To show how "dumb and pointless" they really are, Sam signs up for a beauty pageant, in which Danny serves as the judge due to being the perfect "common, average and bland boy". Little do either one of them realize this is all a plot from Dora the Dragon Ghost to find a wife for her arrogant elder brother, Prince Aragon. Note: Beginning with this episode, Princess Dora is now voiced by Susanne Blakeslee, and Star is now voiced by Tara Strong for the remainder of the series.
35	15	"King Tuck"	Wincat Alcala, Kevin Petrilak & Butch Hartman	Sib Ventress	Wincat Alcala, Ray Angrum, Robb Pratt, & Butch Hartman	March 17, 2006	035
Tucker runs for student council president and feels his voice goes unheard. But on a field trip to the museum, the ancient ghost Hotep-Ra recognizes him as a long lost pharaoh. Tucker finally feels listened to, but his glory consumes him and he sends Casper High back to an ancient Egypt-like place. Will Danny be able to stop a possessed Tucker or will all be lost?
36	16	"Masters of All Time"	Wincat Alcala, Kevin Petrilak & Butch Hartman	Marty Isenberg	Fred Reyes, James Yang, & Butch Hartman	March 24, 2006	036
An Ecto-Acne-ridden Vlad infects Tucker and Sam and forces Danny to help find a cure. Rather than help his foe, Danny travels through time to prevent the accident that caused Vlad to be half-ghost in the first place. This creates an alternate present where Vlad is married to Maddie, and Jack is the half-ghost. Guest Star: David Carradine as Clockwork
37	17	"Kindred Spirits"	Gary Conrad, Daniel de la Vega & Butch Hartman	Steve Marmel & Sib Ventress	Ben Balistreri, Shaunt Nigoghossian, James Yang, & Butch Hartman	April 7, 2006	040
Danny struggles to avoid treating his friends as sidekicks, as Sam and Tucker often take the blame or beating in Danny's ghostly adventures. After leaving them to clean up a golf course, Danny meets his "cousin" Danielle ("Dani") and learns that she herself has ghost powers. As the two half-ghosts battle an enemy ghost together, Dani dodges questions from her curious relative; she feigns weakness and pretends to faint into Danny's arms after the fight. The next day, another ghost attack silences Danny's further attempts to interrogate Dani. Left to take the blame for Danny's mess once again, Sam and Tucker begin to clean the cafeteria in detention, but when they witness Dani and Vlad fly off with an unconscious Danny, they flee detention and attempt to rescue their friend. Meanwhile, Danny discovers Dani is an imperfect female clone of himself created by none other than Vlad Plasmius. Will Danny's friends abandon their hard feelings and come to his aid yet again, or will Vlad finally obtain the DNA sample he needs to clone his ideal half-ghost son? Guest star: AnnaSophia Robb as Danielle "Dani" Phantom
38	18	"Double Cross My Heart"	Gary Conrad, Daniel de la Vega & Butch Hartman	Sib Ventress	Sam Bullock, Steve Daye, Shaunt Nigoghossian, Robb Pratt, & Butch Hartman	May 5, 2006	039
Sam falls head-over-heels for Gregor, a white-haired Hungarian exchange student who sweeps her off her feet, but a jealous Danny suspects he works for the Guys in White.
39	19	"Reality Trip"	Wincat Alcala, Gary Conrad, Kevin Petrilak & Butch Hartman	Steve Marmel, Marty Isenberg & Sib Ventress	Wincat Alcala, Ray Angrum, Shaunt Nigoghossian, Robb Pratt, Fred Reyes, & Butch Hartman	June 9, 2006	037-038
40	20	"Reality Trip"	Wincat Alcala, Gary Conrad, Kevin Petrilak & Butch Hartman	Steve Marmel, Marty Isenberg & Sib Ventress	Wincat Alcala, Ray Angrum, Shaunt Nigoghossian, Robb Pratt, Fred Reyes, & Butch Hartman	June 9, 2006	037-038
Summer vacation plans are put on hold when Freakshow kidnaps the parents of Danny and his friends. He demands them to locate the mystical Reality Gems: the Gem of Life, the Gem of Form, and the Gem of Fantasy for the Reality Gauntlet (with the Power Source) in exchange for their lives, but complications arise when Danny's ghostly secret is accidentally revealed to the entire world, including the Guys in White.: This is 48 minutes long, being two episodes combined.; Guest Star: Jon Cryer as Freakshow

=== Season 3 (2006–07) ===
All episodes this season were directed by Wincat Alcala, Gary Conrad and Butch Hartman, with the exception of Phantom Planet, which was directed solely by Hartman.

No. overall	No. in season	Title	Written by	Storyboard by	Original release date	Prod. code
41	1	"Eye for an Eye"	Story by : Steve Marmel; Written by : Sib Ventress	Wincat Alcala, Fred Reyes, James Yang, & Butch Hartman	August 20, 2007	041
Danny and Vlad's game of revenge starts off childish, but ends when Vlad runs for mayor of Amity Park and wins by possessing the voters. Now Danny must survive the grueling rules the billionaire-turned-politician has placed. In the end, Danny manages to force Vlad to undo his new rules by faking being blasted by him when he tries to make himself look good.
42	2	"Infinite Realms"	Butch Hartman	Wincat Alcala, Shaunt Nigoghossian, Fred Reyes, James Yang, & Butch Hartman	July 9, 2007	042
While trying to map out the Ghost Zone, Danny, Sam and Tucker befriend a ghost named Frostbite who gives them the "Infi-map" that can take the user to any location in the Ghost Zone. However, Vlad manages to steal it. It's up to Danny and friends to get it back, and they must travel through portals and time to defeat Plasmius.
43	3	"Girls' Night Out"	Kevin Sullivan	Ray Angrum, Shaunt Nigoghossian, & Butch Hartman	July 10, 2007	043
As revenge on the men, Spectra, Kitty and Ember join forces and use their powers to make all males vanish from Amity Park. Sam, Jazz and Maddie must team up to undo the damage. Meanwhile, Danny and Jack deal with an unwelcome visit from Skulker during a father/son fishing trip. Guest Stars: William Baldwin as Johnny 13 and Chynna Phillips as Kitty.
44	4	"Torrent of Terror"	Story by : George Goodchild & Ellen Lichtwardt Goodchild; Written by : Butch Hartman & Sib Ventress	Ben Balistreri, Fred Reyes, James Yang, & Butch Hartman	July 11, 2007	044
Looking to increase his popularity as mayor of Amity Park, Vlad frees "Vortex", a weather ghost, and enslaves him to convince the people that Vlad can control the weather. But Vlad loses control of Vortex, and a battle with Danny renders the boy with weather powers of his own, controlled by his temper.
45	5	"Forever Phantom"	Story by : Scott Peterson; Written by : Butch Hartman	Ray Angrum, Shaunt Nigoghossian, James Yang, & Butch Hartman	July 12, 2007	045
A ghost with morphing abilities named Amorpho impersonates Danny Fenton as revenge for Danny Phantom's heroic exploits overshadowing the pranks he pulls be transforming into others and framing them, but both he and the actual Danny Phantom get locked in their forms by a Fenton Device, stuck in the cross holds of fame and madness from the citizens of Amity Park and two angry Fenton parents out for Danny Phantom himself. Guest Star: Danny Mann as Amorpho
46	6	"Urban Jungle"	Butch Hartman	Ben Balistreri, Fred Reyes, James Yang, & Butch Hartman	October 9, 2006	046
A plant ghost named Undergrowth turns Amity Park into a literal jungle, in the process holding the citizens captive. He also kidnaps and brainwashes nature-loving Sam into being his "daughter" and the mother to his "children". Danny must save Amity Park while also trying to keep his newly developed cryokinetic abilities in check with the help of his friend Frostbite. Guest star: Mark Hamill as Undergrowth.
47	7	"Livin' Large"	Mark Drop	Ray Angrum, Aaron Hammersley, Shaunt Nigoghossian, James Yang, & Butch Hartman	July 13, 2007	047
The Fentons sell Fenton Works to the Guys in White who only plan to destroy the Ghost Zone (unaware that Earth will be destroyed too) with a missile, so Sam and Tucker must convince a now-snobbish Danny to stop the Guys the White. Guest Star: Taylor Lautner as Youngblood.
48	8	"Boxed-Up Fury"	Kevin Sullivan	Ben Balistreri, Fred Reyes, James Yang, & Butch Hartman	August 21, 2007	048
The Box Ghost is frustrated that he isn’t taken seriously, so he steals Pandora's Box, unleashing its evil and successfully wreaking havoc on Amity Park. Too weak to fight, Danny's only option is to seek Pandora herself to stop the madness the Box Ghost caused.
49	9	"Frightmare"	Kevin Sullivan	Ray Angrum, Aaron Hammersley, Shaunt Nigoghossian, James Yang, & Butch Hartman	August 22, 2007	049
Danny wakes up from a dream-powered machine, only to find the citizens of Amity Park all under the same deep sleep, thanks to the ghost of dreams Nocturn, who is sucking up their dreams to increase his energy. Danny must wake his friends and sister in order to stop the threat and end the living nightmare. Guest Star: James Garrett as Nocturn and Michael Dorn as The Fright Knight.
50	10	"Claw of the Wild"	Kevin Sullivan	Wincat Alcala, Aaron Hammersley, Fred Reyes, James Yang, & Butch Hartman	August 23, 2007	050
Danny, Sam, Tucker and their classmates go on a camping trip only to find that there are monsters lurking within the forest, kidnapping campers one by one, leaving Danny and Sam to investigate the matter by themselves and reunite with Wulf, whose appearance is linked with the disappearances.
51	11	"D-Stabilized"	Amy Keating Rogers	Ray Angrum, Aaron Hammersley, Shaunt Nigoghossian, James Yang, & Butch Hartman	August 24, 2007	051
Dani Phantom returns to Amity Park with a problem; she has trouble maintaining her body's stability, as she’s still incomplete. Meanwhile, Vlad sends Valerie to capture Dani so that he can use her Danny Phantom-themed DNA to make a much better clone of him. A Fenton invention ends up saving Dani after she turns into ectoplasm. In the end, Valerie finds out that Vlad Masters and Vlad Plasmius are one and the same and declares he is now one of her targets. Note: In this episode, Dani Phantom is now voiced by Krista Swan.
52	12	"Phantom Planet"	Butch Hartman	Wincat Alcala, Ray Angrum, Ben Balistreri, Aaron Hammersley, Shaunt Nigoghossian, Fred Reyes, James Young, & Butch Hartman	August 24, 2007	052
53	13	"Phantom Planet"	Butch Hartman	Wincat Alcala, Ray Angrum, Ben Balistreri, Aaron Hammersley, Shaunt Nigoghossian, Fred Reyes, James Young, & Butch Hartman	August 24, 2007	053
Vlad concocts a plan to humiliate Danny into hiding by replacing him with a team of ghost-hunters he sponsors. After being humiliated and shown up by Vlad's team several times, Danny uses the Fenton Portal to remove his ghost half and decides to go back to a normal life, to the objection of his friends and Jazz. However, a giant asteroid that was blown out of orbit due to one of Vlad's failed schemes nicknamed the "Disasteroid", hurtles toward Earth, threatening not only Earth, but the Ghost Zone as well. Vlad sabotages the Fenton's plan to destroy the Disasteroid and he reveals his ghost half to the entire world in an attempt to gain world domination, but he fails when he discovers the disasteroid is made from an element ghosts can't touch and flees into exile in space. Realizing the mistake he made losing his powers, Danny comes up with a plan to acquire a massive force of ghost energy to turn the Earth intangible so the Disasteroid will harmlessly pass through it. The first attempt to gather the ghosts needed fails and they attack Danny, but their combined ghost energy reawakens Danny's ghost half and he escapes. Danny Phantom announces his plan to the world and everyone works together to create a machine to turn the Earth intangible. Danny goes back into the Ghost Zone to try again to recruit the ghosts to help save the world. After Danny seemingly perishes, Jazz decides to tell her parents Danny's secret. However, Danny is revealed to have survived and convinced the ghosts to save Earth and themselves. Danny's plan works, saving the planet, and Danny reveals his secret to the world and is accepted with great enthusiasm. He gets a statue of his likeness erected in the capital city of every country in his honor and ends up finally dating Sam.: This is 49 minutes longer, being two episodes combined.

== Short film ==
No.	Title	Original release date
1	"The Fairly Odd Phantom"	February 21, 2017
Danny, Sam, Tucker, and Jazz return to find some strange things emerging from the ghost portal. This is a crossover short with characters from The Fairly OddParents, T.U.F.F. Puppy, and Bunsen Is a Beast, Butch Hartman's other shows.

== General ==
- "Danny Phantom Episodes". TV Guide. Archived from the original on April 18, 2009.
