= List of programs produced by ABC Signature =

Television program list

This is a list of programs produced by ABC Signature, a former subsidiary of Disney Television Studios, now folded into 20th Television.

== Television series ==
Title	Genre	First air date	Last air date	No. of seasons	Network	Co-production with	Notes
Touchstone Television (1985–2007)
Wildside	Western	March 21, 1985	April 25, 1985	1	ABC	Tom Greene Productions, Inc.	
The Golden Girls	Sitcom	September 14, 1985	May 9, 1992	7	NBC	Witt/Thomas/Harris Productions	
The Ellen Burstyn Show	Sitcom	September 20, 1986	September 12, 1987	1	ABC	Ellen Burstyn Productions; P.S. 235 Productions	
Harry	Sitcom	March 4, 1987	March 25, 1987	1	ABC		
Down and Out in Beverly Hills	Sitcom	April 26, 1987	September 12, 1987	1	Fox		Based on the 1986 film by Touchstone Films
The Oldest Rookie	Drama	September 16, 1987	January 6, 1988	1	CBS	Gil Grant Productions; Chapman Productions	
Empty Nest	Sitcom	October 8, 1988	June 17, 1995	7	NBC	Witt/Thomas/Harris Productions	
Hard Time on Planet Earth	Science fiction	March 1, 1989	June 21, 1989	1	CBS	Demos-Bard/Shanachie Productions	
The Nutt House	Sitcom	September 20, 1989	October 25, 1989	1	NBC	Brooksfilms Television; Alan Spencer Productions	
Carol & Company	Sketch comedy	March 31, 1990	May 4, 1991	2	NBC	Kalola Productions; Wind Dancer Productions	
Singer & Sons	Sitcom	June 9, 1990	June 27, 1990	1	NBC	Michael Jacobs Productions	
Blossom	Sitcom	July 5, 1990	May 22, 1995	5	NBC	Witt/Thomas Productions; Impact Zone Productions	
Hull High	Musical drama	August 20, 1990	December 30, 1990	1	NBC	Gil Giant Productions	
The Fanelli Boys	Sitcom	September 8, 1990	February 16, 1991	1	NBC	KTMB Productions	
Lenny	Sitcom	September 10, 1990	March 9, 1991	1	CBS	Impact Zone Productions; Witt/Thomas Productions	
Stat	Sitcom	April 16, 1991	May 21, 1991	1	ABC	Tetagram, Ltd.	
Herman's Head	Sitcom	September 8, 1991	April 21, 1994	3	Fox	Witt/Thomas Productions	
Nurses	Sitcom	September 14, 1991	May 7, 1994	3	NBC	Witt/Thomas/Harris Productions	
Pacific Station	Sitcom	September 15, 1991	July 13, 1992	1	NBC	KTMB Productions	
Home Improvement	Sitcom	September 17, 1991	May 25, 1999	8	ABC	Wind Dancer Productions	
Good & Evil	Sitcom	September 25, 1991	October 30, 1991	1	ABC	Witt/Thomas/Harris Productions	
Walter & Emily	Sitcom	November 16, 1991	February 22, 1992	1	NBC	Witt/Thomas Productions	
The Golden Palace	Sitcom	September 18, 1992	June 11, 1993	1	CBS	Witt/Thomas/Harris Productions	
Woops!	Sitcom	September 27, 1992	December 6, 1992	1	Fox	Heartfelt Productions; Witt/Thomas Productions	
Laurie Hill	Sitcom	September 30, 1992	October 28, 1992	1	ABC	The Black/Marlens Company	
Where I Live	Sitcom	March 5, 1993	November 20, 1993	2	ABC	Michael Jacobs Productions	
Cutters	Sitcom	June 11, 1993	July 9, 1993	1	CBS	Turnaround Productions; Grant/Tribune Productions	
Bakersfield P.D.	Sitcom	September 14, 1993	August 18, 1994	1	Fox	Rock Island Productions	
Moon Over Miami	Drama	September 15, 1993	December 1, 1993	1	ABC	Harley Peyton TV; Columbia Pictures Television	
The Sinbad Show		September 16, 1993	April 24, 1994	1	Fox	Michael Jacobs Productions; David & Goliath Productions; Gary Murphy-Larry Strawther Productions	
Boy Meets World		September 24, 1993	May 5, 2000	7	ABC	Michael Jacobs Productions	
Joe's Life		September 29, 1993	December 15, 1993	1	ABC	Bob Myer Productions	
The Good Life		January 3, 1994	April 12, 1994	1	NBC	Interbang, Inc.	
Monty		January 11, 1994	February 15, 1994	1	Fox	Fair Dinkum Productions; Reserve Room Productions	
Thunder Alley		March 9, 1994	July 4, 1995	2	ABC	Wind Dancer Productions	
Someone Like Me		March 14, 1994	April 25, 1994	1	NBC	Sandollar Television; Mohawk Productions	
Ellen		March 29, 1994	July 22, 1998	5	ABC	The Black/Marlens Company	
Hardball		September 4, 1994	October 23, 1994	1	Fox	Interbang, Inc. Magic Beans, Inc.	
All-American Girl		September 14, 1994	March 15, 1995	1	ABC	Sandollar Television; Heartfelt Productions	
Unhappily Ever After		January 11, 1995	May 23, 1999	5	The WB		
The George Wendt Show		March 8, 1995	April 12, 1995	1	CBS	The Cloudland Company	
Pride & Joy		March 21, 1995	May 2, 1995	1	NBC	Reserve Room Productions	
Nowhere Man	Science fiction	August 28, 1995	May 20, 1996	1	UPN	Lawrence Hertzog Productions	
Maybe This Time	Sitcom	September 15, 1995	February 17, 1996	1	ABC	Michael Jacobs Productions	
If Not for You	Sitcom	September 18, 1995	October 9, 1995	1	CBS	Rock Island Productions	
Misery Loves Company	Sitcom	October 1, 1995	October 22, 1995	1	Fox	Michael Jacobs Productions	
Buddies	Sitcom	March 5, 1996	March 27, 1996	1	ABC	Wind Dancer Productions	
The Faculty	Sitcom	March 13, 1996	June 26, 1996	1	ABC	Meredith Baxter Productions; Thompson-Murphy Productions	
Homeboys in Outer Space	Sitcom	August 27, 1996	May 13, 1997	1	UPN	Sweet Lorraine Productions	
Life's Work	Sitcom	September 17, 1996	June 10, 1997	1	ABC	Weest, Inc.	
Dangerous Minds	Drama	September 30, 1996	March 15, 1997	1	ABC	Predawn Productions; Don Simpson/Jerry Bruckheimer Films	Based on the 1995 film by Hollywood Pictures
Social Studies	Sitcom	March 18, 1997	April 22, 1997	1	UPN	Film Fatale, Inc. Sandollar Television	
Soul Man	Sitcom	April 15, 1997	May 26, 1998	2	ABC	Hostage Productions; Wind Dancer Production Group	
Hiller and Diller	Sitcom	September 23, 1997	March 13, 1998	1	ABC	Imagine Television	
Teen Angel	Sitcom	September 26, 1997	February 13, 1998	1	ABC	Spooky Magic Productions	
You Wish	Sitcom	September 26, 1997	June 19, 1998	1	ABC	Michael Jacobs Productions	
Style & Substance	Sitcom	January 5, 1998	September 2, 1998	1	CBS	The Cloudland Company	
Costello	Sitcom	September 15, 1998	October 13, 1998	1	Fox	Wind Dancer Productions	
Sports Night	Sitcom	September 22, 1998	May 16, 2000	2	ABC	Imagine Television	
Felicity	Drama	September 29, 1998	May 22, 2002	4	The WB	Imagine Television	
The Secret Lives of Men	Sitcom	September 30, 1998	November 11, 1998	1	ABC	Witt/Thomas/Harris Productions	
Famous Families	Reality	October 5, 1998	December 13, 1999	2	Fox Family	Glen Avenue Films; Foxstar Productions	
The PJs	Animated sitcom	January 10, 1999	May 20, 2001	3	Fox (Seasons 1–2); The WB (Season 3)	Imagine Television; The Murphy Company; Will Vinton Studios	Moved to Warner Bros. Television after first two seasons
Zoe, Duncan, Jack and Jane	Sitcom	January 17, 1999	June 11, 2000	2	The WB	Michael Jacobs Productions	
Thanks	Sitcom	August 2, 1999	September 2, 1999	1	CBS	Mauretenia Productions	
Once and Again	Drama	September 21, 1999	April 15, 2002	3	ABC	The Bedford Falls Company	
Popular	Dramedy	September 29, 1999	May 18, 2001	2	The WB	Murphy/Matthews Productions; Roundtable Ink; The Shephard/Robin Company	
Brutally Normal	Sitcom	January 24, 2000	February 14, 2000	1	The WB	Swerdlow-Goldberg Productions; The Shephard/Robin Company	
Daddio	Sitcom	March 23, 2000	October 23, 2000	2	NBC	Big Fan Productions	
Wonderland	Drama	March 30, 2000	April 6, 2000	1	ABC	Hostage Productions; Imagine Television	
Clerks: The Animated Series	Animated sitcom	May 31, 2000	June 7, 2000	1	ABC	Miramax Television; View Askew Productions; Woltz International Pictures Corporation; Walt Disney Television Animation (Note: No longer distributed by Buena Vista Television, rights are now owned by Miramax/Paramount Global.)	Based on the 1994 film; four of the six episodes aired on Comedy Central in 2002
Madigan Men	Sitcom	October 6, 2000	December 15, 2000	1	ABC	Chupack Productions; Artists Television Group	
The Trouble with Normal	Sitcom	October 6, 2000	November 3, 2000	1	ABC	Garfield Grove Productions; Paramount Network Television	
The Geena Davis Show	Sitcom	October 10, 2000	July 10, 2001	1	ABC	Wass/Stein Productions	
Gideon's Crossing	Medical drama	October 10, 2000	April 9, 2001	1	ABC	Heel & Toe Films	
The Job	Dramedy	March 14, 2001	April 24, 2002	2	ABC	Apostle; The Cloudland Company; DreamWorks Television	
My Wife and Kids	Sitcom	March 28, 2001	May 17, 2005	5	ABC	Wayans Bros. Entertainment; Impact Zone Productions	
The Beast	Drama	June 13, 2001	July 18, 2001	1	ABC	Imagine Television	
Go Fish	Sitcom	June 19, 2001	July 3, 2001	1	NBC	Wass/Stein Productions	
The Wayne Brady Show	Variety	August 8, 2001	May 21, 2004	3	ABC (Season 1); Syndicated (Seasons 2–3)	Brad Grey Television; Don Mischer Productions	
Alias	Espionage	September 30, 2001	May 22, 2006	5	ABC	Bad Robot	
Bob Patterson	Sitcom	October 2, 2001	October 31, 2001	1	ABC	Angel Ark Productions; 20th Century Fox Television	
Maybe It's Me	Sitcom	October 2, 2001	October 5, 2001	1	May 3, 2002	The WB	SamJen Productions; Warner Bros. Television
Imagine That	Sitcom	January 8, 2002	January 15, 2002	1	NBC	Seth Kurland Productions; Columbia TriStar Television	
Wednesday 9:30 (8:30 Central)	Sitcom	March 27, 2002	June 12, 2002	1	ABC	The Cloudland Company	
Monk	Dramedy	July 12, 2002	December 4, 2009	8	USA	Mandeville Films; Universal Cable Productions	Final series to carry the Touchstone Television logo
8 Simple Rules	Sitcom	September 17, 2002	April 15, 2005	3	ABC	Shady Acres Entertainment; Flody Co. (2002–2004) (seasons 1 & 2); Tracy Gamble Productions (2004) (season 2)	
Life with Bonnie	Sitcom	September 17, 2002	April 9, 2004	2	ABC	Bob & Alice Productions	
Push, Nevada	Drama	September 17, 2002	October 24, 2002	1	ABC	LivePlanet	
MDs	Dramedy	September 25, 2002	December 11, 2002	1	ABC	Marc Platt Productions	
That Was Then	Dramedy	September 27, 2002	October 4, 2002	1	ABC	Brookline Productions; Lemonade Stand Productions	
Less than Perfect	Sitcom	October 1, 2002	June 20, 2006	4	ABC	Wass/Stein Productions	seven unaired episodes were broadcast on Lifetime
Clone High	Animated science fiction-comedy	January 20, 2003	March 10, 2003	1	MTV	Doozer; Lord Miller Productions; Nelvana; MTV	originally aired on Teletoon in Canada; four episodes aired on MTV Classic in 2016
Miracles	Drama	January 27, 2003	March 31, 2003	1	ABC	David Greenwalt Productions; Spyglass Entertainment	
Veritas: The Quest	Drama	January 27, 2003	March 10, 2003	1	ABC	Massett/Zinman Productions; Storyline Entertainment	
Regular Joe	Sitcom	March 28, 2003	April 18, 2003	1	ABC	Fatty McButterpants Productions; Wass-Stein Productions	
Lost at Home	Sitcom	April 1, 2003	April 22, 2003	1	ABC	Michael Jacobs Productions; NBC Studios	
Playmakers	Drama	August 26, 2003	November 11, 2003	1	ESPN	Thanksgiving Day; Imagine Television; Orly Adelson Productions	
Threat Matrix	Drama	September 18, 2003	January 29, 2004	1	ABC	Industry Entertainment	
Hope & Faith	Sitcom	September 26, 2003	May 2, 2006	3	ABC	Industry Entertainment	
10-8: Officers on Duty	Police drama	September 28, 2003	January 25, 2004	1	ABC	Spelling Television; Badlands Entertainment	
It's All Relative	Sitcom	October 1, 2003	April 6, 2004	1	ABC	Storyline Entertainment; Naturally Blond Productions; Paramount Network Television	
Line of Fire	Drama	December 2, 2003	May 30, 2004	1	ABC	Battle Plan Productions; DreamWorks Television	
Kingdom Hospital	Drama	March 3, 2004	July 15, 2004	1	ABC	Sony Pictures Television; Mark Carliner Productions	
Rodney	Sitcom	September 21, 2004	June 6, 2006	2	ABC	Rude Mood Productions; Himmel Films	
Kevin Hill	Drama	September 29, 2004	May 18, 2005	1	UPN	Icon Productions	
Life as We Know It	Drama	October 7, 2004	January 20, 2005	1	ABC	Sachs/Judah Productions; Cabloom! Productions	
Tilt	Drama	January 13, 2005	March 13, 2005	1	ESPN	Koppelmann/Levien; Orly Adelson Productions; Whizbang Films	
Little House on the Prairie	Drama	March 26, 2005	April 23, 2005	1	ABC	Ed Friendly Productions; Voice Pictures	miniseries
Empire	Drama	June 28, 2005	July 26, 2005	1	ABC	Storyline Entertainment	miniseries
Inconceivable	Drama	September 23, 2005	September 30, 2005	1	NBC	Tollin/Robbins Productions	
Commander in Chief	Drama	September 27, 2005	June 14, 2006	1	ABC	Battle Plan Productions; Steven Bochco Productions	
Night Stalker	Drama	September 29, 2005	November 10, 2005	1	ABC	Big Light Productions	Four episodes aired on Sci Fi in 2006
In Justice	Drama	January 1, 2006	March 31, 2006	1	ABC	Spud TV; King Size Productions	
Crumbs	Sitcom	January 12, 2006	February 7, 2006	1	ABC	Marco Pennette Productions; Tollin/Robbins Productions	
Courting Alex	Sitcom	January 23, 2006	March 29, 2006	1	CBS	April Fools Productions; Paramount Network Television	
What About Brian	Dramedy	April 16, 2006	March 26, 2007	2	ABC	Bad Robot; Sachs/Judah Productions (season 1)	
Three Moons Over Milford	Science fiction	August 6, 2006	September 24, 2006	1	ABC Family	Three Moons Film	
Six Degrees	Drama	September 21, 2006	March 30, 2007	1	ABC	Bad Robot; Nosebleed Productions	Last five episodes released on ABC.com
In Case of Emergency	Sitcom	January 3, 2007	April 11, 2007	1	ABC	Bushwacker Productions; Howard J. Morris Productions	
The Knights of Prosperity	Sitcom	January 3, 2007	August 8, 2007	1	ABC	B&B Productions; Worldwide Pants Incorporated	
ABC Studios (2007–2020)
Scrubs	Sitcom	October 2, 2001	March 17, 2010	9	NBC (Seasons 1–7); ABC (Seasons 8–9)	Doozer	Credited as Touchstone Television for first six seasons
According to Jim	Sitcom	October 3, 2001	June 2, 2009	8	ABC	Newman/Stark Production; Suzanne Bukinik Entertainment; Brad Grey Television	Credited as Touchstone Television until 2007
Lost	Science fiction	September 22, 2004	May 23, 2010	6	ABC	Bad Robot	Credited as Touchstone Television until 2007
Desperate Housewives	Dramedy	October 3, 2004	May 13, 2012	8	ABC	Cherry Productions	Credited as Touchstone Television until 2007
Ghost Whisperer	Supernatural drama	September 23, 2005	May 21, 2010	5	CBS	CBS Television Studios; Sander/Moses Productions	Credited as Touchstone Television until 2007
Kyle XY	Science fiction	June 26, 2006	March 16, 2009	3	ABC Family	Kyle XY Productions; BenderSpink Productions; Two Cigarettes; One Match Productions (2006); (season 1)	Credited as Touchstone Television until 2006
Brothers & Sisters	Family drama	September 24, 2006	May 8, 2011	5	ABC	Berlanti Television; After Portsmouth Productions	Credited as Touchstone Television until 2007
Ugly Betty	Dramedy	September 28, 2006	April 14, 2010	4	ABC	Silent H Productions; Ventanarosa; Reveille Productions	Credited as Touchstone Television until 2007
Day Break	Fantasy	November 15, 2006	December 13, 2006	1	ABC	Matthew Gross Entertainment	Credited as Touchstone Television until 2006; last seven episodes were broadcast on TV One in 2008
Dirt	Journalism drama	January 2, 2007	April 13, 2008	2	FX	Coquette Productions; Matthew Carnahan Circus Products; FX Productions	credited as Touchstone Television until 2007
October Road	Drama	March 15, 2007	March 10, 2008	2	ABC	Space Floor TV; Mojo Films; Group M Entertainment (season 1)	credited as Touchstone Television until 2007
Army Wives	Military drama	June 3, 2007	June 9, 2013	7	Lifetime	The Mark Gordon Company	
Cane	Family drama	September 25, 2007	December 18, 2007	1	CBS	Once a Frog Productions; El Sendero Productions; Interscope Television; CBS Paramount Network Television	
Reaper	Supernatural drama	September 25, 2007	May 26, 2009	2	The CW	The Mark Gordon Company; Fazekas & Butters; Dark Baby Productions	
Dirty Sexy Money	Legal drama	September 26, 2007	August 8, 2009	2	ABC	Berlanti Productions	
Private Practice	Medical drama	September 26, 2007	January 22, 2013	6	ABC	Shondaland; The Mark Gordon Company	
Carpoolers	Sitcom	October 2, 2007	March 4, 2008	1	ABC	DreamWorks Television; T.R.O.N.T Productions; 3 Arts Entertainment	
Cavemen	Sitcom	October 2, 2007	November 13, 2007	1	ABC	Double Vision Productions; Television 360	
Samantha Who?	Sitcom	October 15, 2007	July 23, 2009	2	ABC	Donald Todd Productions; Brillstein Entertainment Partners	
Amas de Casa Desesperadas	Dramedy	January 10, 2008	June 19, 2008	1	Univision	Pol-Ka Producciones; Cherry Productions	U.S. Spanish-language adaptation of Desperate Housewives
Eli Stone	Legal drama	January 31, 2008	July 11, 2009	2	ABC	Berlanti Productions	
Raising the Bar	Legal drama	September 1, 2008	December 24, 2009	2	TNT	Steven Bochco Productions	
Samurai Girl	Action	September 5, 2008	September 7, 2008	1	ABC Family	Space Floor TV; Alloy Entertainment	Miniseries
Gary Unmarried	Sitcom	September 24, 2008	March 17, 2010	2	CBS	Ed Yeager Productions (2008–2009) (season 1); Rude Mood Productions (2008–2009) (season 1); CBS Television Studios	
Life on Mars	Science fiction	October 9, 2008	April 1, 2009	1	ABC	20th Century Fox Television, Kudos Film and Television and Space Floor TV	Based on the British series of the same name by Matthew Graham, Tony Jordan and Ashley Pharoah
Legend of the Seeker	Fantasy	November 1, 2008	May 22, 2010	2	Syndicated	Paperboy Productions and Renaissance Pictures	
Castle	Police drama	March 9, 2009	May 16, 2016	8	ABC	Beacon Pictures, The Barry Schindel Company (2009) (season 1); Experimental Pictures (2009–13) (seasons 2–5); Milmar Pictures (2013–2015) (seasons 6–7)	
In the Motherhood	Sitcom	March 26, 2009	June 25, 2009	1	ABC	Pointy Bird Productions; Spud TV; Mindshare Entertainment	
Cupid	Dramedy	March 31, 2009	June 16, 2009	1	ABC	Rob Thomas Productions; Sony Pictures Television	
Ruby & the Rockits	Sitcom	July 21, 2009	September 22, 2009	1	ABC Family	Shaun Cassidy Productions	
Cougar Town	Sitcom	September 23, 2009	March 31, 2015	6	ABC (Seasons 1–3); TBS (Seasons 4–6)	Doozer; Coquette Productions	
FlashForward	Science fiction	September 24, 2009	May 27, 2010	1	ABC	HBO Entertainment; Phantom Four Films	
Happy Town	Crime drama	April 28, 2010	June 16, 2010	1	ABC	Space Floor Television	
Scoundrels	Dramedy	June 20, 2010	August 15, 2010	1	ABC	Long Run Productions	
Detroit 1-8-7	Police drama	September 21, 2010	March 20, 2011	1	ABC	Remainder Men Productions; Mandeville Television	
My Generation	School drama	September 23, 2010	September 30, 2010	1	ABC	26 Keys Productions	
No Ordinary Family	Superhero drama	September 28, 2010	April 5, 2011	1	ABC	Berlanti Television; Oh That Gus!, Inc.	
Off the Map	Medical drama	January 12, 2011	April 6, 2011	1	ABC	Shondaland and Minnesota Logging Company	
Criminal Minds: Suspect Behavior	Crime drama	February 16, 2011	May 25, 2011	1	CBS	The Mark Gordon Company; Bernero Productions; CBS Television Studios	
Body of Proof	Medical drama	March 29, 2011	May 28, 2013	3	ABC	Matthew Gross Entertainment; Arcturus Productions (2011–2013) (seasons 2–3)	
Happy Endings	Sitcom	April 13, 2011	May 3, 2013	3	ABC	Sony Pictures Television; FanFare Productions; Shark vs. Bear Productions (2012–2013); (season 3)	
The Protector	Police drama	June 12, 2011	September 19, 2011	1	Lifetime	Wass/Stein Productions	
State of Georgia	Sitcom	June 29, 2011	August 17, 2011	1	ABC Family	Jennifer Weiner Productions; Kirk J. Rudell Productions	
Ringer	Thriller	September 13, 2011	April 17, 2012	1	The CW	Green Eggs And Pam Productions, Inc. Brillstein Entertainment Partners; CBS Productions; Warner Bros. Television	
Revenge	Thriller	September 21, 2011	May 10, 2015	4	ABC	Page Fright (2011–2013); Temple Hill Entertainment	
Man Up!	Sitcom	October 18, 2011	December 6, 2011	1	ABC	Garfield Grove; Bicycle Path Productions; Tagline Television	
Once Upon a Time	Fantasy	October 23, 2011	May 18, 2018	7	ABC	Kitsis-Horowitz	
The River	Horror	February 7, 2012	March 20, 2012	1	ABC	Haunted Movies; J.A. Green Construction Corp. Amblin Television	
GCB	Dramedy	March 4, 2012	May 6, 2012	1	ABC	Darren Star Productions; Kapital Entertainment	
Missing	Adventure	March 15, 2012	May 17, 2012	1	ABC	Little Engine Productions; Upcountry Productions	
Scandal	Political drama	April 5, 2012	April 19, 2018	7	ABC	Shondaland	
Perception	Crime drama	July 9, 2012	March 17, 2015	3	TNT	Paperboy Productions	
The Neighbors	Sitcom	September 26, 2012	April 11, 2014	2	ABC	17–28 Black, Inc. Kapital Entertainment	
Nashville	Musical drama	October 10, 2012	July 26, 2018	6	ABC (Seasons 1–4); CMT (Seasons 5–6)	Lionsgate Television, Opry Entertainment; Cutler Productions (season 1); Walk & Chew Gum, Inc. Small Wishes Productions (seasons 1–4); The Bedford Falls Company (season 5)	Production company for first five seasons
Malibu Country	Sitcom	November 2, 2012	March 22, 2013	1	ABC	ACME Productions; Blah Blah Blah Productions	
Zero Hour	Adventure	February 14, 2013	August 3, 2013	1	ABC	Clickety-Clack Productions; Di Bonaventura Pictures	
Red Widow	Mob drama	March 3, 2013	May 5, 2013	1	ABC	Endemol	
Galip Derviş	Dramedy	March 21, 2013	December 28, 2014	3	Kanal D	Barakuda Film; Universal Cable Productions	Turkish adaptation of Monk by Andy Breckman
Family Tools	Sitcom	May 1, 2013	July 10, 2013	1	ABC	The Mark Gordon Company; ITV Studios America	
Mistresses	Drama	June 3, 2013	September 6, 2016	4	ABC	Good Talk Productions (seasons 1–2); Bob Sertner Productions; Ecosse Films; Tsiporah Productions (season 3)	
Devious Maids	Drama	June 23, 2013	August 8, 2016	4	Lifetime	Cherry/Wind Productions; Televisa Internacional	US adaptation of the Televisa Mexican TV series, Ellas son la alegría del hogar; Originally ordered and developed at ABC
Agents of S.H.I.E.L.D.	Secret agent drama	September 24, 2013	August 12, 2020	7	ABC	Mutant Enemy Productions; Marvel Television	
Lucky 7	Drama	September 24, 2013	October 1, 2013	1	ABC	Amblin Television; Remainder Men; The Beekeeper's Apprentice	
Trophy Wife	Sitcom	September 24, 2013	May 13, 2014	1	ABC	Quantity Entertainment	
Betrayal	Thriller	September 29, 2013	February 19, 2014	1	ABC	Remainder Men Productions; Scripted World Productions; Omroepvereniging VARA	
Hello Ladies	Sitcom	September 29, 2013	November 17, 2013	1	HBO	Four Eyes Entertainment; Quantity Entertainment	
Once Upon a Time in Wonderland	Fantasy	October 10, 2013	April 3, 2014	1	ABC	Kitsis/Horowitz	
Intelligence	Spy drama	January 7, 2014	March 31, 2014	1	CBS	CBS Television Studios; Michael Seitzman's Pictures; Tripp Vinson Productions; The Barry Schindel Company	
Killer Women	Crime drama	January 7, 2014	February 18, 2014	1	ABC	Electus; LatinWE	
Mixology	Sitcom	February 26, 2014	May 21, 2014	1	ABC	Lucas & Moore; Ryan Seacrest Productions	
Resurrection	Supernatural drama	March 9, 2014	January 25, 2015	2	ABC	Plan B Entertainment; Brillstein Entertainment Partners; FTP Productions	
Red Band Society	Dramedy	September 17, 2014	February 7, 2015	1	Fox	Amblin Television; Filmax	
How to Get Away with Murder	Crime drama	September 25, 2014	May 14, 2020	6	ABC	Shondaland; NoWalk Entertainment	
Manhattan Love Story	Sitcom	September 30, 2014	October 21, 2014	1	ABC	Brillstein Entertainment Partners; Burrow Owl Productions	Last seven episodes were released on Hulu
Galavant	Musical	January 4, 2015	January 31, 2016	2	ABC	Rhode Island Ave. Productions	
Agent Carter	Secret agent drama	January 6, 2015	March 1, 2016	2	ABC	Fazekas & Butters; Marvel Television	
Secrets and Lies	Crime drama	March 1, 2015	December 4, 2016	2	ABC	Avenue K Productions; Hoodlum; Kapital Entertainment	
American Crime	Crime drama	March 5, 2015	April 30, 2017	3	ABC	International Famous Players Radio Pictures Corporation; Stearns Castle Entertainment	
Daredevil	Superhero drama	April 10, 2015	October 19, 2018	3	Netflix	DeKnight Productions (season 1); Goddard Textiles; Marvel Television	Moved to Disney+ on March 16, 2022
The Whispers	Science fiction	June 1, 2015	August 31, 2015	1	ABC	Clickety-Clack Productions; Amblin Television	
The Astronaut Wives Club	Period drama	June 18, 2015	August 20, 2015	1	ABC	Fake Empire; Groundswell Productions	
The Muppets	Sitcom	September 22, 2015	March 1, 2016	1	ABC	Bill Prady Productions; The Muppets Studio	
Quantico	Thriller	September 27, 2015	August 3, 2018	3	ABC	Random Acts Productions; Maniac Productions; The Mark Gordon Company	
Grandfathered	Sitcom	September 29, 2015	May 10, 2016	1	Fox	Rhode Island Ave. Productions; Consolidated Chumworks; 20th Century Fox Television	
Code Black	Medical drama	September 30, 2015	July 18, 2018	3	CBS	Michael Seitzman's Pictures; Maniac Productions (Season 3); Tiny Pyro Productions; CBS Television Studios	
Dr. Ken	Sitcom	October 2, 2015	March 31, 2017	2	ABC	Old Charlie Productions; Davis Entertainment; Sony Pictures Television	
Wicked City	Crime drama	October 27, 2015	November 10, 2015	1	ABC	Mandeville Television	Last five episodes were released on Hulu
Jessica Jones	Superhero drama	November 20, 2015	June 14, 2019	3	Netflix	Tall Girls Productions; Marvel Television	Moved to Disney+ on March 16, 2022
Madoff	Drama	February 3, 2016	February 4, 2016	1	ABC	Lincoln Square Productions	Miniseries
The Real O'Neals	Sitcom	March 2, 2016	March 14, 2017	2	ABC	Windsor & Johnson Productions; Di Bonaventura Pictures	
The Family	Thriller	March 3, 2016	May 15, 2016	1	ABC	Mandeville Films; Minnesota Logging Company	
Of Kings and Prophets	Religious drama	March 8, 2016	March 15, 2016	1	ABC	BoomGen Studios; Philotimo Factory; Jason T. Reed Productions	
Criminal Minds: Beyond Borders	Crime drama	March 16, 2016	May 17, 2017	2	CBS	Erica Messer Productions; The Mark Gordon Company; CBS Television Studios	
The Catch	Thriller	March 24, 2016	May 11, 2017	2	ABC	Shondaland	
Uncle Buck	Sitcom	June 14, 2016	July 5, 2016	1	ABC	Will Packer Productions; Unaccountable Freaks Productions; Universal Television	
Speechless	Sitcom	September 21, 2016	April 12, 2019	3	ABC	Silver & Gold Productions; The Detective Agency; 20th Century Fox Television	
Designated Survivor	Political drama	September 21, 2016	June 7, 2019	3	ABC (Seasons 1–2); Netflix (Season 3)	Genre Films; Bevel Gears (season 3); The Mark Gordon Company	
Notorious	Journalism drama	September 22, 2016	December 8, 2016	1	ABC	Osprey Productions and Sony Pictures Television	
Luke Cage	Superhero drama	September 30, 2016	June 22, 2018	2	Netflix	Marvel Television	Moved to Disney+ on March 16, 2022
Conviction	Legal drama	October 3, 2016	January 29, 2017	1	ABC	Double Fried Productions; The Mark Gordon Company	
When We Rise	Historical drama	February 27, 2017	March 3, 2017	1	ABC	Hungry Jackal Productions; Laurence Mark Productions	Miniseries
Iron Fist	Superhero drama	March 17, 2017	September 7, 2018	2	Netflix	Devilina Productions (season 1); Marvel Television	Moved to Disney+ on March 16, 2022
Imaginary Mary	Sitcom	March 29, 2017	May 30, 2017	1	ABC	David Guarascio Productions; Adam F. Goldberg Productions; Happy Madison Productions; Sony Pictures Television	
Downward Dog	Sitcom	May 17, 2017	June 27, 2017	1	ABC	Mosaic Media Group; Animal Media Group; Legendary Television	
Still Star-Crossed	Period drama	May 29, 2017	July 29, 2017	1	ABC	Shondaland	
The Defenders	Superhero drama	August 18, 2017		1	Netflix	Goddard Textiles; Nine and a Half Fingers, Inc. Marvel Television	Miniseries; Moved to Disney+ on March 16, 2022
Inhumans	Superhero drama	September 29, 2017	November 10, 2017	1	ABC	Devilina Productions; Marvel Television	Financed by IMAX Corporation
Kevin (Probably) Saves the World	Fantasy	October 3, 2017	March 6, 2018	1	ABC	Fazekas & Butters	
The Mayor	Sitcom	October 3, 2017	December 12, 2017	1	ABC	Jeremy Bronson Productions; Fee-Fi-Fo Films; FanFare Productions	
The Punisher	Superhero drama	November 17, 2017	January 18, 2019	2	Netflix	Bohemian Risk Productions; Marvel Television	Moved to Disney+ on March 16, 2022
The Alec Baldwin Show	Talk show	March 4, 2018	December 29, 2018	1	ABC	Greengrass Productions; El Dorado Pictures	originally Sundays with Alec Baldwin
For the People	Legal drama	March 13, 2018	May 16, 2019	2	ABC	Davies Heavy Industries; Shondaland	
Alex, Inc.	Sitcom	March 28, 2018	May 16, 2018	1	ABC	Davis Entertainment; Two Soups Productions; Sony Pictures Television	
The Crossing	Science fiction	April 2, 2018	June 9, 2018	1	ABC	Dworkin/Beattie Productions; Brick Moon Television	
Take Two	Detective drama	June 21, 2018	September 13, 2018	1	ABC	Milmar Pictures; Tandem Communications; StudioCanal	
Single Parents	Sitcom	September 26, 2018	May 13, 2020	2	ABC	Elizabeth Meriwether Pictures; JJ Philbin Productions; 20th Century Fox Television	
The Kids Are Alright	Sitcom	October 16, 2018	May 21, 2019	1	ABC	Mr. Bigshot Fancy-Pants Productions Inc.	
Schooled	Sitcom	January 9, 2019	May 13, 2020	2	ABC	Adam F. Goldberg Productions; Happy Madison Productions; Marc Firek Productions; Doug Robinson Productions; Sony Pictures Television	
The Fix	Legal drama	March 18, 2019	May 20, 2019	1	ABC	Happier in Hollywood; Mandeville Films	
Bless This Mess	Sitcom	April 16, 2019	May 5, 2020	2	ABC	Elizabeth Meriwether Pictures; Lake Bell Prod. 20th Century Fox Television	
Grand Hotel	Serial drama	June 17, 2019	September 9, 2019	1	ABC	UnbeliEVAble Entertainment; BT's Fishing Team	
Reef Break	Crime drama	June 20, 2019	September 13, 2019	1	ABC	Wild Poppy Entertainment	Credited as ABC Studios International; aired on M6 in France
Emergence	Mystery	September 24, 2019	January 28, 2020	1	ABC	Fazekas & Butters	
Stumptown	Detective drama	September 25, 2019	March 25, 2020	1	ABC	Jason Richman Entertainment; The District	
Pick of the Litter	Documentary	December 20, 2019	January 24, 2020	1	Disney+	KTF Films; Submarine Deluxe	Limited series; removed from Disney+ on May 26, 2023
Amazing Stories	Anthology	March 6, 2020	April 3, 2020	1	Apple TV+	Universal Television; Kitsis/Horowitz; Amblin Television	Based on the 1985 TV series of the same name
The Baker and the Beauty	Dramedy	April 13, 2020	June 1, 2020	1	ABC	Dean Georgias Entertainment/2.0; Keshet Studios; Universal Television	
Prop Culture	Documentary	May 1, 2020		1	Disney+	Cinema Relics Productions	Removed from Disney+ on May 26, 2023
ABC Signature Studios (2012–2020)
Benched	Sitcom	October 28, 2014	December 30, 2014	1	USA	The Mark Gordon Company	
Blood & Oil	Drama	September 27, 2015	December 13, 2015	1	ABC	Flame Ventures	
Dead of Summer	Horror	June 28, 2016	August 30, 2016	1	Freeform	Kitsis-Horowitz	
Guerrilla	Period drama	April 16, 2017	May 14, 2017	1	Showtime	Green Door Pictures; International Famous Players Radio Pictures Corporation; Fifty Fathoms; Stearns Castle	Miniseries; aired on Sky Atlantic in the UK
SMILF	Dark comedy	November 5, 2017	March 31, 2019	2	Showtime	Showtime Networks; Supahsmart Productions; Quantity Entertainment; Groundswell Productions	
Runaways	Superhero drama	November 21, 2017	December 13, 2019	3	Hulu	Marvel Television; Fake Empire	Removed from Hulu on May 26, 2023
Cloak & Dagger	Superhero drama	June 7, 2018	May 30, 2019	2	Freeform	Wandering Rocks Productions; Marvel Television	
All About the Washingtons	Sitcom	August 10, 2018		1	Netflix	Simmons Lehman Productions; Amblin Television	
High Fidelity	Dramedy	February 14, 2020		1	Hulu	Midnight Radio; West & Kuczarek	Based on the 2000 film of the same name by Touchstone Pictures
Little Fires Everywhere	Drama	March 18, 2020	April 22, 2020	1	Hulu	Hello Sunshine; Best Day Ever Productions; Simpson Street	Limited series; based on the novel of the same name
Helstrom	Fantasy	October 16, 2020		1	Hulu	Marvel Television	
ABC Signature (2020–2024)
Black-ish	Sitcom	September 24, 2014	April 19, 2022	8	ABC	Khalabo Ink Society; Artists First; Cinema Gypsy Productions	Credited as ABC Studios until 2020.
American Housewife	Sitcom	October 11, 2016	March 31, 2021	5	ABC	Eight Sisters, Inc. Wiener & Schwartz Productions; Kapital Entertainment	Credited as ABC Studios until 2020.
The Good Doctor	Medical drama	September 25, 2017	May 21, 2024	7	ABC	3AD Productions; EnterMedia Content; Shore Z Productions; Sony Pictures Television	Credited as ABC Studios until 2020.
Grown-ish	Sitcom	January 3, 2018	May 22, 2024	6	Freeform	Khalabo Ink Society; Principato-Young Entertainment; Cinema Gypsy Productions	Credited as ABC Signature Studios until 2020.
Harrow	Medical drama	March 9, 2018	April 11, 2021	3	ABC TV – Australia	Hoodlum Entertainment	Credited as ABC Studios International until 2019.
Station 19	Firefighter drama	March 22, 2018	May 30, 2024	7	ABC	Shondaland	Credited as ABC Studios until 2020.
A Million Little Things	Dramedy	September 26, 2018	May 3, 2023	5	ABC	Next Thing You Know Productions; Fee-Fi-Fo Films; Kapital Entertainment	Credited as ABC Studios until 2020.
Mixed-ish	Sitcom	September 24, 2019	May 18, 2021	2	ABC	Khalabo Ink Society; Cinema Gypsy Productions; Artists First	Credited as ABC Studios until 2020.
Dollface	Sitcom	November 15, 2019	February 11, 2022	2	Hulu	LuckyChap Entertainment; Clubhouse Pictures	Credited as ABC Signature Studios until 2020; removed from Hulu on May 26, 2023.
For Life	Legal drama	February 11, 2020	February 24, 2021	2	ABC	Sony Pictures Television; Channel Road Productions; Doug Robinson Productions; G-Unit Films and Television Inc.	Credited as ABC Studios until 2020.
United We Fall	Sitcom	July 15, 2020	August 26, 2020	1	ABC	Julius Sharpe International Petroleum & Writing; Exhibit A Sony Pictures Television	Credited as ABC Studios until 2020.
Woke	Sitcom	September 9, 2020	April 8, 2022	2	Hulu	Cloud Nine Productions; Olive Bridge Entertainment; Sony Pictures Television	Credited as ABC Studios until 2020.
The Wilds	Drama	December 11, 2020	May 5, 2022	2	Amazon Prime Video	Amazon Studios; FanFare Productions; Dylan Clark Productions	
Call Your Mother	Sitcom	January 13, 2021	May 19, 2021	1	ABC	Kari's Logo Here; Sony Pictures Television	
The Gloaming	Supernatural drama	March 21, 2021	May 9, 2021	1	Starz	Sweet Potato Films; 2 Jons	Limited series; originally released on Stan in Australia
The Mighty Ducks: Game Changers	Sports dramedy	March 26, 2021	November 30, 2022	2	Disney+	Goldsmith Yuspa Productions; Brillco; Brillstein Entertainment Partners	Based on The Mighty Ducks by Walt Disney Pictures; removed from Disney+ on May 26, 2023
Home Economics	Sitcom	April 7, 2021	January 18, 2023	3	ABC	Lionsgate Television; Colton & Aboud; The Tannenbaum Company	
Rebel	Drama	April 8, 2021	June 10, 2021	1	ABC	Trip the Light Productions; Davis Entertainment; Sony Pictures Television	
Big Shot	Sports dramedy	April 16, 2021	October 12, 2022	2	Disney+	David E. Kelley Productions; Lorey Stories	Removed from Disney+ on May 26, 2023
Queens	Musical drama	October 19, 2021	February 15, 2022	1	ABC	Windpower Entertainment; How My Hair Look	
Promised Land	Drama	January 24, 2022	March 29, 2022	1	ABC (episodes 1–5); Hulu (episodes 6–10)	Neptune Way; Lit Entertainment; Little Mountain Films	
Everything's Trash	Sitcom	July 13, 2022	September 7, 2022	1	Freeform	Tiny Reparations	
Five Days at Memorial	Drama	August 12, 2022	September 16, 2022	1	Apple TV+	Genre Arts; International Famous Radio Players Pictures Corporation	Miniseries
This Fool	Sitcom	August 12, 2022	July 28, 2023	2	Hulu	Tutu, Get In The Car; Incredible Success! Red Pulley Productions; Antigravico	
The Rookie: Feds	Police drama	September 27, 2022	May 2, 2023	1	ABC	Entertainment One; Perfectman Pictures; Winterworks	Spin-off of The Rookie.
Fleishman Is in Trouble	Dramedy	November 17, 2022	December 29, 2022	1	Hulu	AknerCorp; Timberman/Beverly Productions	Limited series; based on the novel of the same name
National Treasure: Edge of History	Adventure	December 14, 2022	February 8, 2023	1	Disney+	Jerry Bruckheimer Television; Disney Branded Television	Based on National Treasure
The Watchful Eye	Thriller	January 30, 2023	March 27, 2023	1	Freeform	Ryan Seacrest Productions; Why I Believe in Fox	Originally titled The Nanny
Unprisoned	Dramedy	March 10, 2023	July 17, 2024	2	Hulu	Onyx Collective; Anonymous Content; SisterLee Productions; Simpson Street	
Tiny Beautiful Things	Dramedy	April 7, 2023		1	Hulu	Best Day Ever; Hello Sunshine; Jaywalker Pictures	Limited series; based on the book of the same name
Saint X	Psychological drama	April 26, 2023	May 31, 2023	1	Hulu	Anonymous Content; Dogarooski Productions; DreamCrew Entertainment	Limited series; Based on the novel of the same name
A Small Light	Drama	May 1, 2023	May 22, 2023	1	National Geographic	National Geographic Studios; John Street Productions; Midwest Livestock; Keshet Studios	Limited series
The Muppets Mayhem	Musical comedy	May 10, 2023		1	Disney+	Adam F. Goldberg Productions; The Muppets Studio	
Black Cake	Drama	November 1, 2023	December 6, 2023	1	Hulu	Harpo Films; Kapital Entertainment; Two Drifters	Based on the book of the same name
Death and Other Details	Mystery	January 16, 2024	March 5, 2024	1	Hulu	Riding in Circles Productions; Last In First Out Inc. Black Lamb	Originally titled Career Opportunities in Murder and Mayhem
Under the Bridge	True crime drama	April 17, 2024	May 29, 2024	1	Hulu	Best Day Ever Productions	Limited series; based on the book of the same name
How to Die Alone	Sitcom	September 13, 2024	September 27, 2024	1	Hulu	Onyx Collective; Welcome Stranger; Big Hattie Productions	

== Television films ==
Title	Genre	Premiere date	Network	Co-production with	Notes
Touchstone Television (1987–2007)
The Music Man	Musical	February 15, 2003	ABC	Storyline Entertainment	
The Muppets' Wizard of Oz	Musical	May 20, 2005	ABC	Fox Television Studios; The Muppets Holding Company; The Jim Henson Company	
Romy and Michele: In the Beginning	Comedy	May 30, 2005	ABC Family	Bungalow 78 Productions; Palm Tree Productions	
Once Upon a Mattress	Musical	December 8, 2005	ABC	Tudor Television; Mabel Cat Inc. Marc Platt Productions	
ABC Signature Studios (2012–2020)
Confirmation	Political thriller	April 16, 2016	HBO	Groundswell Productions; HBO Films	

== See also ==
- List of 20th Television programs
- 20th Television Animation
- List of TV series produced by Walt Disney Studios
