= Chad Connell =

Canadian actor (born 1983)

- Born: Chad James Connell; May 20, 1983 (age 43); Ottawa, Ontario, Canada
- Occupation: Actor
- Years active: 1999–present

Chad James Connell (born May 20, 1983) is a Canadian actor.

== Career ==
Connell is a graduate of Ryerson University (now Toronto Metropolitan University)'s theatre program in Toronto. He began acting in local productions in Ottawa at the age of 11. His first starring role was the role of Oliver in the musical of the same name. He played the role of Zakhar in the premiere Jason Sherman's adaptation of Gorky's Enemies while at university.

Connell has appeared in Degrassi: The Next Generation, Wild Roses, Prom Wars and Hallmark Channel's Taking a Chance on Love, as well as Lifetime's Double Wedding with Tia Mowry and Tamera Mowry. He appeared as the demon Lambert in the 2013 release of The Mortal Instruments, as well as the vampire Quinn on the television series adaptation, Shadowhunters.

In 2018, Connell recurred on Mike Clattenburg's CBC Comedy series Crawford, as the boyfriend to Jill Hennessy's character.

Connell will star alongside Tiya Sircar in the May 2019 Netflix Original movie Good Sam, based on the book by Dete Meserve.

== Personal life ==
Aside from acting, Chad Connell has a keen interest in wine and owns a wine importing agency dealing in natural wines.

== Filmography ==
Film
Year	Title	Role	Notes
1999	Home Team	Eric	
2001	The Secret Pact	Paul Cardiff	
2002	Abandon	Pirates of Penzance	
2002	Posers	Pretty boy	
2008	Prom Wars	Rupert	
2013	White House Down	Gabriel Byrnes	
2013	The Mortal Instruments: City of Bones	Lambert	
2014	Steel	Daniel	
2015	Gone Tomorrow	Finn Blake	
2019	Good Sam	Eric	
2021	The Retreat	Connor	
2024	Mother Father Sister Brother Frank	Carl	

Television
Year	Title	Role	Notes
2002	Undressed	Rick	2 episodes
2006–2007	Rumours	Sammy Sorrenson	6 episodes
2007	Jeff Ltd.	Delivery boy #2	Episode: "Too Many Hens in the Foxhouse"
2007	Nature of the Beast	Logan	Television film
2008	ReGenesis	Tom Gleason	Episode: "TB or not TB"
2008	Degrassi: The Next Generation	Ben	3 episodes
2008	Degrassi Spring Break Movie	Ben	Television film
2008	Murdoch Mysteries	Prince Alfred	Episode: "The Prince and the Rebel"
2009	Wild Roses	Aaron	Episode: "Secrets and Lies"
2009	Being Erica	Luc	Episode: "What Goes Up Must Come Down"
2009	Taking a Chance on Love	Billy Miller	Television film
2009	Almost Audrey	Steve	Television film
2010	At Risk	Toby Huber	Television film
2010	Double Wedding	Jasper Cooper	Television film
2010–2011	Warehouse 13	Jack	2 episodes
2011	Suits	Jason Black	Episode: "Dogfight"
2011	Flashpoint	Tom	Episode: "A New Life"
2011	Lost Girl	Christoph	Episode: "Death Didn't Become Him"
2012	Burden of Evil	Jamie Conner	Television film
2013	Nikita	Chris	3 episodes
2013	Murdoch Mysteries	Owen Mathers	Episode: "Murdoch Ahoy"
2013	Beauty & the Beast	William Keller	Episode: "Hothead"
2013	Star Spangled Banners	Colin Roth	Television film
2014	Sensitive Skin	Michael Dorkins	Episode: "Not the Haitian Corpse"
2016	Good Witch	Greg	4 episodes
2017	Reign	Lord Taylor	Episode: "Highland Games"
2017	ShadowHunters	Quinn	3 episodes
2018	Crawford	Bryce	5 episodes
2018	Mary Kills People	Dr. Bobby Dunn	4 episodes
2019	A Cheerful Christmas	James Anderson	Hallmark Television film
2020	The Christmas Setup	Aiden Spencer	TV movie
2021	A Perfect Match	Oliver Beckett	TV movie
