= Aqlvoy =

Uzbek children's TV channel

- Country: Uzbekistan
- Broadcast area: Uzbekistan
- Headquarters: Tashkent, Uzbekistan

Programming
- Languages: Uzbek; Russian; English
- Picture format: 16:9

Ownership
- Owner: Ministry of Preschool Education

History
- Launched: 22 March 2021; 4 years ago

Aqlvoy is an Uzbek children's television channel owned by the Ministry of Preschool Education in Uzbekistan. The channel's main target audience is 3-9-year-old children. The channel is available in Uzbek, Russian and English, although both Russian and English tracks are combined into one, where most Western media will be broadcast in English, while most Russian media will be published in Russian.

== History ==
Aqlvoy was originally announced at the IMS Media Day conference in 2020, saying that it would be set to launch in the spring of 2021. The channel then later launched on 22 March 2021, with most of its programming being brought from countries such as Russia and South Korea. The channel has aired several international shows from distributors such as Cake Entertainment, Hoho Entertainment, One Animation and Paramount Global.

The channel mascots are a yellow robot who goes by the name "Robbi", and a yellow bus who is named Aqlvoy, like the channel itself. In 2021, Aqlvoy hosted a contest to see who could come up with a name for the robot, where Robbi had gotten his name. In the early stages of development, the yellow bus was originally going to be a scooter, but this was changed for unknown reasons.

== Programming ==
On 26 April 2021, the channel premiered two original programs, Bilimdon and Quvnoqvoy. Bilimdon (meaning knowledge) is an educational live action series that teaches children about mathematics, along with Uzbek culture. The series' second season is currently in production. Quvnoqvoy (from "quvnoq" meaning cheerful and "voy" meaning "wow") is an educational program where one of the channel's mascots, Robbi, guides two other children to do exercises and physical activities with the viewers. Several famous Uzbek athletes have appeared in the series.

=== Original programming ===
- Bob va Eli
- Biliasanmi
- Bilimdon
- Quvnoqvoy
- Sehrli Ingliz tili

== International programming ==
Aqlvoy broadcasts various international programming from countries such as the United States, Canada, South Korea, Russia, the Netherlands, and the United Kingdom; mostly animated series.

All shows (save for Sonic Boom, which aired during the channel's "test phase" and was shown in Russian only), are dubbed and localized into the Uzbek language, with a rotating schedule of different shows each week.

== Controversy ==
In June 2021, the channel was criticized by many parents for showing the painting The Birth of Venus, along with showing two people kissing in the cartoon Sherazade: The Untold Stories. The channel has since responded, saying that the channel was still in its test phase, so mistakes may appear at any time.

Due to this, many foreign cartoons that have scenes where characters display actions of love have been censored and cut out. A notable example of this can be seen in the series Ready Jet Go!, where scenes of Celery and Carrot showing affection to each other had been cut out.
