= Weather Hunters =

- Genre: Adventure; Comedy
- Created by: Al Roker
- Developed by: Carin Greenberg
- Directed by: Kyran Kelly; Michael Pascucci; Jay Silver; Greg Richardson
- Voices of: Tandi Fomukong; Frank Welker; Al Roker; Holly Robinson Peete; Kapri Ladd; Lorenzo Ross; Sheryl Lee Ralph
- Opening theme: "Weather Hunters Theme" performed by Yvette Nicole Brown
- Ending theme: "Weather Hunters Theme" (instrumental)
- Composer: Jim Lang
- Country of origin: United States
- Original language: English
- No. of seasons: 1
- No. of episodes: 21

Production
- Executive producers: Al Roker; Dete Meserve; Carin Greenberg; John Semper
- Running time: 23 minutes
- Production companies: Al Roker Entertainment; Silver Creek Falls Entertainment

Original release
- Network: PBS Kids
- Release: September 8, 2025 – present

Weather Hunters is an American animated children's television series that premiered on September 8, 2025, on PBS Kids. The series is produced by Al Roker Entertainment and Silver Creek Falls Entertainment. The first full episode was initially set to premiere on July 7, 2025, on PBS Kids in the United States, but was delayed to September 8 of the same year which was the initial premiere date for Phoebe & Jay. The series' art style combines 2D animation with the characters' computer animation.

== Premise ==
The series follows an 8-year-old girl named Lily Hunter and her family. Lily is a weather detective. In each episode, she embarks on a quest with her dog, Cumulus, to solve mysteries by utilising her knowledge of the weather and forecasting skills. Other members of the Hunter family include Al Hunter, Lily’s father, and the meteorologist, Dot Hunter, Lily’s mother. Lily’s sister, Corky Hunter, is an 11-year-old budding documentarian who loves capturing exciting weather events on video, and Benny Hunter, Lily’s 5-year-old younger brother, is always drawing or painting something he has seen during the family’s adventures. The Hunter’s neighbor, Ms Joyce, is a wealthy woman who lives across from the Hunter family. The Hunters are descended from the late Wallace Hunter, a Tuskegee Weatherman who spent his twilight years designing various weather-related gadgets, including the Vansformer, the super-advanced flying van that they use as a mobile weather station. The Hunter family say their catchphrase, "Whatever the Weather, We're in It Together", in every episode.

Each episode aims to teach viewers a lesson about the weather through reality-based scientific explanations of various weather phenomena.

== Cast ==
=== Main ===
- Tandi Fomukong as Lily Hunter, a young girl who is a weather detective. She is 8 years old. In every episode, she embarks on a quest with her family to solve mysteries by utilising her knowledge of the weather and forecasting skills. She lives with her younger brother Benny, her older sister Corky, her mother Dot, and her father Al.
- Lorenzo Ross as Benny Hunter, Lily's younger brother. He is 5 years old. He loves being creative, and is always drawing or painting something he has seen during the Hunter family’s adventures.
- Kapri Ladd as Corky Hunter, Lily's older sister. She is 11 years old. She loves capturing exciting weather events on video.
- Al Roker as Al Hunter, Lily's father. He is 30 years old.
- Holly Robinson Peete as Dot Hunter, Lily's mother. She is 33 years old.
- Frank Welker as Cumulus, the Hunters' pet dog.

=== Recurring ===
- Sheryl Lee Ralph as Ms. Joyce, a wealthy woman who lives across from the Hunter family.
- LeVar Burton as Wallace Hunter and his gadgets
- Rodney Saulsberry as Aloysius Herbert Bingham
- Gogo Lomo-David as Gyang, Dot and Al's old friend
- Simisola Gbadamosi as Binta, Lily, Benny, and Corky's friend.
- Debra Wilson as Maureen Hughes, the Hunter family's mail carrier and Vera
- Isaiah Goodrum as Kyree

== Production ==
On January 16, 2023, at the Television Critics Association Press Tour, PBS Kids announced that it would begin production on Weather Hunters. The show is produced by Al Roker Entertainment and Silver Creek Falls Entertainment and follows a weather detective who tries to share with everyday lessons, the weather, and her family.

Yvette Nicole Brown performs the main title song, while the music for the series was composed by Jim Lang.

== Broadcast ==
The series premiered on PBS Kids on September 8, 2025. It was initially scheduled to premiere on July 7, 2025.

== Episodes ==
No.	Title	Written by	Original release date	Prod. code
1	"The Windy Day"	John Semper	September 8, 2025	101
It's an exciting day for Lily and her family when they move into their new house.
2	"The Vansformer"	Written by : Natalie Vazquez; Story by : John Semper	September 9, 2025	102
Lily and her family discover a surprise and also embark on a weather hunting expedition.
3	"Finding Cumulus"	Written by : Carin Greenberg and John Semper; Story by : Monique Hall	September 10, 2025	103
The Hunters find a stowaway in their picnic basket, a little furry dog.
4	"Cold Snap"	Written by : Natalie Vazquez; Story by : Rebecca Kaminski	September 11, 2025	109
The Hunters learn how temperatures can affect outdoor plants and gardens.
5	"A Dark and Stormy Night"	Omotunde Akiode and John Semper	September 15, 2025	114
The Hunters search for a way to monitor the weather after they lose power during a thunderstorm.
6	"The Leaf Painter"	John Semper	September 16, 2025	105
The Hunter kids head to the state park to learn why leaves change color.
7	"Foggy Trick or Treat"	Written by : Kermit Frazier; Story by : Carin Greenberg and John Semper	September 17, 2025	104
A foggy Halloween almost derails Corky and Lily's trick-or-treating.
8	"Corky's Weird Desert Mystery"	Written by : Natalie Vazquez; Story by : John Semper	September 22, 2025	116
The Hunters investigate a weather mystery surrounding massive rocks that move on their own in the desert.
9	"The Word on the Bird"	Joelle Sellner	September 23, 2025	117
The Hunters try to help an injured bird so it can join its friends migrating south for the winter.
10	"No Snow Snow Day"	Mark Hoffmeier	September 24, 2025	106
The Hunters head to a nearby mountain to learn about snow.
11	"Christmas in Africa"	Written by : Joelle Sellner; Story by : Carin Greenberg and John Semper	December 8, 2025	126
Dot and Al announce the Hunters are spending Christmas in Nigeria, and Corky wonders if she can have a fun Christmas without snow.
12	"Through Rain, Sun, Snow or Hail"	Written by : Crystal Villareal and Allan Neuwirth; Story by : John Semper	December 9, 2025	121
Benny becomes enamoured with Ms. Hughes the mail carrier, and wonders how she delivers the mail in different weather conditions.
13	"Groundhog Birthday"	Allan Neuwirth	January 19, 2026	122
After a groundhog predicts more winter weather, Benny is convinced he will have snow on his birthday so he plans a snow-filled birthday party.
14	"Mother's Day Rainbow"	Written by : Natalie Vazquez; Story by : Mark Hoffmeier	May 4, 2026	107
With Dot away, Al and the kids orchestrate a rainbow-filled Mother's Day surprise.
15	"Properly Prepared"	Written by : Brynne Chandler; Story by : Mark Hoffmeier	May 5, 2026	137
As a hurricane approaches, the Hunter kids learn about preparation and safety, moving furniture inside and checking their emergency supplies.
16	"The Little Weatherproof Library"	Natalie Vazquez	May 6, 2026	123
When the Hunters create a community library, they need to keep the books dry from the rain.
17	"Voyage of the Melting Snow"	John Semper	May 7, 2026	124
Benny's toy penguin is swept away by melting snow, transforming a day of sledding into an urgent rescue mission.
18	"Weather Icons"	Kris Marvin Hughes	August 17, 2026	131
The kids help Al put on a one-of-a-kind weather presentation when the power goes out.
19	"The Weathercast"	John Semper	August 18, 2026	139
Lily, Corky and Benny attempt to film their own weather broadcast, but need Great Grandpa Wallace's tools to create their weathercast.
20	"Oh, the Humidity!"	Mark Henry and John Semper	August 19, 2026	125
Corky is selected to make a presentation at school during a science day celebration, but humidity jeopardizes her project.
21	"Corky's Weird Rainforest Mystery"	Written by : Susan Kim; Story by : Jonathan Hernandez	August 20, 2026	127
The Hunters investigate a mysterious rain that happens with no clouds in the Indonesian rainforest.
22	"Weather Hunters on Ice"	TBA	December 14, 2026	113
After waking up to a frozen winter wonderland outside, the Hunters attempt a fun, icy scavenger hunt.
23	"Winter Wonderland"	TBA	December 15, 2026	120
The Hunters host a friend from Nigeria and show her how to have fun playing in the snow.
24	"The Hunter Family Trees"	TBA	December 16, 2026	115
The Hunters search for cool places in the neighborhood, finding unexpected shade in their backyard.
TBA	"The Puddle Problem"	TBA	TBA	108
TBA	"Sun Protection"	TBA	TBA	110
TBA	"The Cloudy Day"	TBA	TBA	TBA
