= List of Ready Jet Go! episodes =

The following is a list of episodes from the PBS Kids series Ready Jet Go!.

== Series overview ==
Season	Segments	Episodes	Originally released	
Season	Segments	Episodes	First released	Last released
1	77	40	February 15, 2016	February 6, 2018
2	45	24	April 2, 2018	May 6, 2019
Films	—N/a	3	August 14, 2017	July 20, 2023

== Episodes ==
=== Season 1 (2016–18) ===
No. overall	No. in season	Title	Written by	Storyboard by	Original release date
1	1	"Tour of the Solar System" "Jet Cooks Dinner"	Craig Bartlett Joe Purdy	Milo Neuman; Bert Ring	February 15, 2016
"Tour of the Solar System": Jet and his friends are playing a Solar System game but mess up on which planets go where, so they take a trip to space to find out the order of the planets in the Solar System. "Song": Solar System Song "Jet Cooks Dinner": While Jet's parents are away, he and his friends decide to cook the "classic 3-part Bortronian meal" for them, but they have trouble with the cooking. Sean teaches them the Scientific Method so they can get the recipe right. "Song": Scientific Method "Learning Goals": The Sun is at the center of the Solar System, and everything else revolves around it. The Sun, planets, dwarf planets, moons, and different kinds of space rocks such as asteroids and comets are all part of the Solar System. "Failure is not the opposite of success; failure is a stepping stone to success." This attitude can be applied to cooking as well as scientific discoveries.
2	2	"How We Found Your Sun" "Treehouse Observatory"	Craig Bartlett Joe Purdy	Milo Neuman; Bert Ring	February 16, 2016
"How We Found Your Sun": Jet explains how his family, the Propulsions, found Earth by way of the Sun, a star in the Milky Way galaxy. Celery takes the kids out into space and shows them how the Sun looks huge, or small like other stars, depending on your perspective. "Treehouse Observatory": Sydney, Jet, Sunspot, and Sean fix up a treehouse and make it into their own clubhouse/observatory. The kids build their own telescope so they can all observe the nighttime sky.
3	3	"Round and Round" "The Plant From Bortron 7"	Joe Purdy Craig Bartlett	Milo Neuman; Bert Ring; Jeffery Stewart	February 17, 2016
"Round and Round": The kids learn how all the planets both orbit around the Sun and rotate on their own axes at the same time. "The Plant From Bortron 7": Jet attempts to grow a seed from his home planet, but the light from the Sun is stronger than the light from Bortron 7, and has a surprising effect on the plant.
4	4	"Just the Right Distance from the Sun" "Solar Power Rover"	Craig Bartlett Rachel Lipman	Milo Neuman; Bert Ring	February 18, 2016
"Just the Right Distance from the Sun": Sean explains to the group that Earth is a Goldilocks planet: It's not too hot and not too cold, it's just right. When Celery flies the kids out into space, they observe how other planets don't have the attributes to support life. "Solar Power Rover": Jet, Sean, and Sydney visit their Mars Robot Rover friend at the DSA and discover that the rover seems tired. Through helping the solar-powered robot regain its energy, they learn how energy can be captured, used from the Sun, and used anywhere, even on Mars. "Learning Goals": All life on Earth comes from the energy of the Sun. The Earth happens to be located just the right distance from the Sun: not too far away and not too close. This makes the Earth a "Goldilocks planet": not too hot, not too cold. The Sun creates solar power that is used for energy. Solar power is the conversion of sunlight into electricity, either directly or indirectly.
5	5	"How Come the Moon Has Craters?" "Backyard Moon Base"	Craig Bartlett Rachel Lipman	TBA	February 19, 2016
"How Come the Moon Has Craters?": The kids take a trip to the Moon and learn that falling asteroids probably created all the craters on the Moon's surface. "Backyard Moon Base": Led by Sydney, the kids build a Moon base in Jet's backyard and use their imaginations to figure out what challenges they would need to overcome in order to live on the Moon.
6	6	"How Come the Moon Changes Shape?" "Night of a Bazillion Stars"	Craig Bartlett Joe Purdy	TBA	February 22, 2016
"How Come the Moon Changes Shape": When Jet, Sydney, and Sean have a hard time trying to explain the phases of the Moon to Mindy, Jet's parents, Celery and Carrot, offer to fly them out to space so they can see how the Moon changes shape depending on perspective. "Night of a Bazillion Stars": Jet, Sydney, and Sean decide to have a sleepover in Jet's backyard. They use Sean's telescope to look at the night sky and learn why stars twinkle and planets don't.
7	7	""Earth Mission to Moon" "Mindy's Moon Bounce House""	Joe Purdy Rachel Lipman	Milo Neuman; Bert Ring; Jeffery Stewart	February 23, 2016
"Earth Mission to Moon": Sean tells Jet, Sydney, and Mindy about the Apollo 11 mission, and the kids decide to do a real-life reenactment of man's first mission landing on the Moon. "Mindy's Moon Bounce House": Jet gives a special birthday gift to Mindy that allows her to defy gravity. She has so much fun hovering above everyone, the others have to convince her to come back to Earth in time for her party.
8	8	"Beep has the Blues" "Chore Day"	Craig Bartlett; Story by : Amy Mainzer & Craig Bartlett Rachel Lipman	Milo Neuman; Bert Ring	February 24, 2016
"Beep has the Blues": Beep is sad because her sister rover on Mars, Boop, is sick and can't move. Celery flies the kids out to Mars to try to help and discover the problem – that Boop's solar panels have been covered in dust. "Chore Day": Jet learns what chores are, and he and Sean help Sydney turn her chores into science games.
9	9	"A Kid's Guide to Mars" "Jet 2"	Rachel Lipman Joe Purdy	Chris Nance; Rachel Buecheler	February 25, 2016
"A Kid's Guide to Mars": Jet, Sydney, and Sean go to Mars with Jet's parents, who need to file a travel report on it. Meanwhile, Face 9000's brother, Face 9001, pays a visit.. "Jet 2": Jet wants to watch Commander Cressida with Sydney, but realizes he also promised to help Sean. He builds a robot version of himself so he can be at two places at once but becomes jealous when his friends begin playing with the robot. "Learning Goals": Mars was once (4 billion years ago) a lot like Earth, with oceans, clouds and drinkable water. Something happened 3.7 billion years ago that turned Mars' atmosphere from warm and wet to dry and cold. A robot is an automatic mechanical device often resembling a human or animal. Humans build robots to perform the tasks humans can't do, but people are still in control because they give instructions to the robots.
10	10	"More Than One Moon" "Visit to Mom's Office"	Craig Bartlett Rachel Lipman	Milo Neuman; Bert Ring; Jeffery Stewart	February 29, 2016
"More Than One Moon": Mindy is shocked to learn that there is more than one moon in the Solar System. Celery flies the kids out to Mars so they can see what its two moons look like compared to ours. "Visit to Mom's Office": Sean and Sydney take Jet to meet Sean's mom, a scientist, at the Deep Space Array. She explains that they're looking for stars with their own systems of exoplanets to detect if there might be any that contain life. But will taking Jet out in public expose his secret identity?
11	11	""Mission to Mars" "Sounds Abound""	Joe Purdy Rachel Lipman	TBA	March 1, 2016
"Mission to Mars": When Jet and Sydney interrupt Sean doing some training in his backyard to eventually lead a mission to Mars, Jet suggests they just have his mom fly them out to Mars. Is Sean's concern about Martian dust devils legitimate? "Sounds Abound": Sean is trying to work on a science project for Space Troops, but is interrupted by his friends' constant noise. His search for a quiet place to conduct his experiment leads him to the realization that sound is exactly what his experiments needed all along.
12	12	""What's Up With Saturn's Rings?" "Sunspot's Night Out""	Joe Purdy	TBA	March 2, 2016
"What's Up With Saturn's Rings?": Celery takes Jet, Sydney, and Sean on a trip to explore Saturn's rings to learn what they're made of. "Sunspot's Night Out": When Sunspot goes missing in the neighborhood, Sydney, Sean, and Jet use the North Star to navigate their way to where he is.
13	13	"The Grandest Canyon" "A Visit to the Planetarium"	Rachel Lipman Craig Bartlett	TBA	March 3, 2016
"The Grandest Canyon": When the Propulsions are forced to watch a slide show of the Petersons' vacation to the Grand Canyon, they're inspired to take their own trip to Mars to explore Valles Marineris—the largest canyon in the Solar System! "A Visit to the Planetarium": Sean and Sydney take Jet to the DSA to see a show at the Planetarium. But things take a fun turn when Jet decides to upgrade the show with some Bortronian technology and sings a song explaining how to find Earth in the Milky Way galaxy!
14	14	"A Visit from Uncle Zucchini" "Mindy's Weather Report"	Rachel Lipman	Milo Neuman; Bert Ring; Jeffery Stewart	March 22, 2016
"A Visit from Uncle Zucchini": Celery's brother, Zucchini, and his pet, Moonbeam, decide to visit the Propulsions, but get lost along the way. The kids have to figure out where on Earth he is. As it turns out, Uncle Zucchini never made it to Earth, but has landed on a place that sort of resembles Earth – Titan, Saturn's largest moon! Titan has Earth-like features such as oceans, mountains, and an atmosphere. "Mindy's Weather Report": Mindy and Sunspot, watching a weather report broadcast on FACE 9000's screen, learn of a huge storm system on Saturn. When the other kids hear about it, they mistakenly assume the storm is somewhere local. Mayhem ensues as the misinformation spreads and everyone rushes around to prepare, while Mindy meanwhile "broadcasts" her own weather report from Jet's house.
15	15	"Ice Moon Enceladus" "What Goes Up..."	Craig Bartlett	Milo Neuman; Bert Ring; Jeffery Stewart	April 11, 2016
"Ice Moon Enceladus": Sean sets up a sno-cone stand to help raise money to send a spaceship to Mars. But it's the hottest day of the year and he quickly runs out of ice, and he can't find any nearby. Then Jet has an idea where they can go to get some ice—Saturn's ice moon, Enceladus! "What Goes Up...": Jet builds a mini-flying saucer in his garage and wants to test it, but to succeed, he has to learn what gravity is and how it works.
16	16	"Solar System Bake-Off!" "Kid-Kart Derby"	Joe Purdy Craig Bartlett	TBA	April 12, 2016
"Solar System Bake Off!": Mindy and Carrot are entering a cooking competition and are making desserts representing the different planets of the Solar System. But they hit a bump when they can't remember if Saturn is cold on the inside and hot on the outside… or the other way around. Jet, Sydney, and Sean fly with Celery out to Saturn to find out before the competition begins, so Mindy and Carrot can finish their entry in time. "Kid-Kart Derby": Jet builds an electric engine from scratch for the annual soapbox derby competition, but Mitchell, determined to win the derby, is suspicious that Jet is using some alien technology.
17	17	"Asteroids, Meteors, and Meteorites" "Mindy's Meteorite Stand"	Craig Bartlett; Joe Purdy	TBA	April 13, 2016
"Asteroids, Meteors, and Meteorites": Sean is determined to beat his mystery competitor at a video game of "Astro-Tracker." When Face 9000 tells the kids about the Asteroid Belt, Sean realizes that the best way to learn about asteroids is to see them for himself. Celery flies them out to space, and the kids learn the difference between an asteroid, a meteor, and a meteorite. Worried at first, Sean learns that only the rare asteroid (called a meteorite) makes it all the way to Earth, so he decides that he'll become really good at "Astro-Tracker" to prepare for the future when he can be on a team of scientists who track rogue asteroids. "Mindy's Meteorite Stand": When Mindy and Sunspot are digging in the yard, they discover a unique rock that Mindy is convinced is a meteorite. The kids conduct a series of tests to find out and amazingly the rock passes each test. "Meteorite fever" grips the neighborhood, as Mindy sets up a stand so people can see her meteorite, and bring her rocks to assess. In the end, a DSA scientist confirms that Mindy's rock actually isn't a meteor… but the random rock Mindy's sitting on is.
18	18	"Comet Fever" "Asteroid Patrol"	Rachel Lipman	Milo Neuman; Bert Ring; Jeffery Stewart	April 14, 2016
"Comet Fever": The neighborhood is having a star gazing party when Mindy discovers what may be a new comet. While Celery takes Jet, Sean, and Sydney out to space to get a close-up look at the comet, Carrot and Mindy decide to surprise the others and make their very own comet in the backyard using ingredients from home. "Asteroid Patrol": When Sean learns that asteroids are floating around the Solar System (potentially), he decides to set up a homemade asteroid watch-station in the treehouse, and gets all the other kids involved. Eventually, Sean's mother and her colleague at the DSA help Sean and the others understand how scientists monitor the skies for asteroids, a job that Sean doesn't need to do all by himself.
19	19	"Mindy Pet-sits" "Treehouse Space Station"	Joe Purdy Craig Bartlett	TBA	April 15, 2016
"Mindy Pet-sits": Sean, Sydney, Jet, and Carrot head out to view the Northern Lights. Mindy, upset she can't go, gets a boost – Sunspot stays back and agrees to let her be his pet-sitter. As the group in the saucer searches for, yet can't find, the Northern Lights, Sunspot and Mindy work on a backyard project – making their own backyard "Northern Lights" display. "Treehouse Space Station": When the kids realize that they all want to use the treehouse at the same time for different activities, arguments break out. Mindy tries to help by creating a schedule for each kid to use the treehouse alone. In the end, the kids realize they need each other's company and ideas in order to be successful in their own projects. In resolving their problem, the kids learn to think like the scientists on the International Space Station, who have to find a solution to the problem of getting along while doing different projects in a small space.
20	20	"Date Night" "Face on the Fritz"	Craig Bartlett Rachel Lipman	Milo Neuman; Bert Ring; Jeffrey Stewart	August 15, 2016
"Date Night": When Jet realizes that it's the anniversary of Carrot and Celery's first date, he wants to recreate that first picnic they had on one of Bortron 7's moons. The kids all get involved to help create the perfect date night. "Face on the Fritz": When the kids are trying to build a new pet house for Sunspot and FACE 9000 gives them mixed-up directions, they learn that it is time for FACE 9000 to get upgraded. In the meantime FACE 9000's "substitute," the "DATA-BOX," is an old Earth computer from the early 1980s. The kids need to learn how to give instructions in the way computers understand, putting them in charge of using technology in an active way. When FACE 9000 comes back, they have learned to appreciate him, as well as to be more independent thinkers.
21	21	"So Many Moons" "Project Pluto"	Craig Bartlett Rachel Lipman	TBA	August 16, 2016
"So Many Moons": When Mindy is concerned that the possible addition of a younger sibling to her family might be a challenge, Jet says imagine having a family with more than 60 siblings! That's what it's like for the 67 moons of Jupiter. "Project Pluto": When Mindy is excited about presenting her kid model of Pluto for school show and tell, the other kids don't want to disappoint her by breaking the news to her that Pluto is not a planet.
22	22	"Sunspot and the Great Red Spot" "Uncle Zucchini Babysits"	Joe Purdy Rachel Lipman	Milo Neuman; Bert Ring	August 17, 2016
"Sunspot and the Great Red Spot": Sunspot is determined to get to Jupiter to meet his fellow pet aliens, other members of the Red Spot Club. The Club is thousands of years old. They meet annually at an exact time to observe and celebrate the Great Red Spot. But, mechanical problems with the family wagon/saucer may thwart the trip. The kids and Celery do everything they can to get Sunspot to Jupiter and his Red Spot Club meet-up. "Uncle Zucchini Babysits": Uncle Zucchini finally gets to Earth for a visit, just as the Propulsion parents are called away on a work assignment. Uncle Zucchini volunteers to watch the kids. In the process of helping the kids coax Sunspot into taking a bath, Uncle Zucchini learns about the three states of water (solid, liquid, and gas).
23	23	"Diggin' Earth" "Mindy's Mystery"	Joe Purdy	TBA	December 27, 2016
"Diggin' Earth": The kids try to dig into the Center of the Earth (a la Commander Cressida), but after finding out that the center is much too hot and the layer of Earth leading up to it is solid rock, they re-vamp their plans. They decide to become the kids to dig down the deepest into the Earth. Learning about the layers of the Earth inspires Jet to make an Earth Layer Cake. "Mindy's Mystery": Mindy can't sleep one night, having been kept awake by a sweet, strong smell from outside. Sydney, Sean, Jet, and Sunspot become detectives and try to crack the case of the sweet smell. At the same time, Mitchell is investigating what kept him up last night - a very bright "annoying" light. In the end, there's a common source - the sweet smell was from a nocturnal flower, the Moonflower, which only blooms at night, after sundown. And the bright light was from the Moon.
24	24	"Which Moon is Best?" "Detective Mindy"	Craig Bartlett; Rachel Lipman	TBA	August 18, 2016
"Which Moon is Best?": Sean wants to be the first to walk on a moon, like his hero Neil Armstrong. When Sydney points out that 12 astronauts have already walked on the Moon, Sean thinks that rather than be the 13th to walk on the Moon, why not be the first to walk on ANOTHER moon in the Solar System? Sure, but which moon? The kids decide to compare the frozen moons Europa, which orbits Jupiter, and Enceladus, which orbits Saturn. They get help from Carrot and Celery, who fly them to each one, and Sean gets to walk on them. "Detective Mindy": When Mitchell's mother declares the kitchen counter a "black hole" because she can't find her sunglasses and she's sure she left them there, Mitchell takes up the case of the black hole kitchen counter. As he's investigating, one by one, all the other kids get involved in his process. As they learn about what a black hole really is, Mitchell discovers that science holds enough mysteries to keep him busy for many years.
25	25	"Tiny Blue Dot" "Earth Camping"	Craig Bartlett; Rachel Lipman	TBA	August 19, 2016
"Tiny Blue Dot": A rollicking, song-filled recap of the Propulsion family's mission to Earth – as intergalactic travel writers, they really know their way around the Milky Way, and know the difference between a lovely, livable "Goldilocks Planet" like Earth, and the other, way less-livable planets! "Earth Camping": Mr. Petersen and Mitchell go camping with Carrot and Jet. The two dads have opposite approaches to setting up tents and preparing food, but when the dads get off track during a hike, the boys help them all find their way back using the compass, and the skills they've learned from their dads (turns out the kids were paying attention all along!).
26	26	"What's a Satellite?" "Satellite Selfie"	Craig Bartlett Rachel Lipman	Yanzi She; Meg Syverud; Bert Ring	December 28, 2016
"What's a Satellite?": An Earth-orbiting "telecom" communications satellite breaks down, and satellite TV service in Boxwood Terrace stops working. Three people can't watch their favorite shows and consequently get very upset. Jet decides to fly up to space and see what the problem is with the satellite, and hilarity ensues. "Satellite Selfie": The kids learn that they can use links to different websites to see a satellite view of their house. Mindy notices that Jet's house is not in the image. That's because these images are from sometime over the past 2 years, and not live images from space. With Dr. Rafferty's help, the kids identify the next time a satellite will pass over their neighborhood, and try to gather for a 'space selfie' next to Jet's house.
27	27	"Space Junk" "Scientific Sean"	Joe Purdy Craig Bartlett	Meg Syverud; Yanzi She; Charlotte Vevers	December 29, 2016
"Space Junk": After learning about space junk, the kids are determined to help do their part to clean up their 'space neighborhood.' They meet up with Uncle Zucchini, a long-time galaxy garbage man! Using Bortronian technology, they start a cleanup. During the course of the day, our kids learn that recycling is necessary both on Earth and in space! "Scientific Sean": Jet is fascinated by Earth paper airplanes when he watches Sean casually fold one. Jet suggests that the kids challenge each other to build the plane that will fly the farthest, and still carry the payload of a message. Sean wants to use the Scientific Method to solve the distance/size issues.
28	28	"Beep and Boop's Game" "Constellation Prize"	Joe Purdy Rachel Lipman	TBA	June 5, 2017
"Beep and Boop's Game": The kids help Dr. Rafferty and Bergs get Mars Rover BOOP over a ravine on the red planet by simulating actions in the DSA 'Mars Yard' using BEEP (Boop's sister)! Trial and error leads to success. Along the way, the kids learn just how scientists communicate with far away rovers - through satellites above Mars. The kids then solve a new mystery set up by Bergs, figuring out that Beep and Boop are communicating about... a game of Mars/Mars Yard tic-tac-toe they're playing! "Constellation Prize": When Mindy thinks she's found her own star, the other kids explain how stars are labeled and identified by constellations. Mindy eventually learns that she hasn't found a new star, but that she CAN create her own version of a constellation by connecting patterns in the sky.
29	29	"Sunday Drive"	Craig Bartlett and Joe Purdy	TBA	December 26, 2016
After the Propulsions download their new version of their saucer dashboard operating system, things are out of whack. Their test drive to Mars - usually a simple trip - is complicated by the new dashboard. They zip to Venus and Saturn instead... and then finally land on Mars, so they think. They're actually in an Earth desert, Mars-like at first (hot, red soil, lack of water), but soon they realize where they are. A desert vs. Mars comparison is made. Before heading home, the family decides that the old, dependable saucer operating system works just fine for them.
30	30	"Total Eclipse of the Sunspot" "Sean's Year in Space"	Craig Bartlett	Milo Neuman; Bert Ring	August 15, 2017
"Total Eclipse of the Sunspot": While Mindy, Jet, Sean, and Sydney are trying to use a solar panel to improve their energy efficiency, they notice that Sunspot is acting strange. It turns out that Sunspot was aware of an impending eclipse and was trying to alert the kids to the fact that the Sun would be darkened for a while. "Sean's Year in Space": Sean is excited by NASA's 'Year in Space' program on the ISS, and decides to try to live for a year in the tree house without ever coming down. The kids keep interrupting him, and finally, after only a short afternoon of trying, he comes down for dinner.
31	31	"Jet's First Halloween"	Joe Purdy and Craig Bartlett	TBA	October 24, 2016
Sydney, Sean, and Mindy help Jet experience his first Halloween. They come up with a list of classic Halloween to-dos, including carving Jack-o-lanterns, dressing up in costumes, and collecting candy. Celery takes the kids on a quick trip to space to see what causes a lunar eclipse. Meanwhile, Mitchell Petersen is on the case to figure out what exactly is going on with that strange Propulsion family... Sydney, Sean, and Mindy take Jet trick-or-treating, and along the way, they learn about the Red Moon effect from some of the neighborhood scientists. Carrot and Celery turn their garage into a haunted house, which is an unexpected hit with the neighborhood. Jet and Sunspot even make Mindy's Halloween wish come true by flying across the Red Moon as a witch and her cat on a broom.
32	32	"Whole Lotta Shakin'" "My Fair Jet"	Joe Purdy Craig Bartlett	Meg Syverud; Charlotte Vevers	June 6, 2017
"Whole Lotta Shakin": The kids and Sunspot attempt to build the tallest tower ever on the Moon, hoping to beat Jet's cousin's record. While building, the Moon's surface shakes. Huh? The Earth kids are amazed to learn that the Moon has quakes, and Jet is just as amazed to learn that Earthquakes exist. After learning about the causes of moonquakes, the kids attempt to build a Moonquake-proof structure. "My Fair Jet": Sean and Sydney are planning to take Jet to the DSA Open House the upcoming weekend. The Earth kids are nervous that he will get in front of a crowd of strangers and forget to keep the secret that he's an alien from Bortron 7. After a hilarious outburst from Jet, the kids are motivated to try to 'train' him to behave less like an alien from outer space, and more like a 'regular Earthie kid.' Jet's doing well until he ends up using his Bortronian jet-pack to fly up to rescue the DSA weather balloon when it's about to get away in some bad weather.
33	33	"From Pluto With Love" "A Star is Born"	Craig Bartlett Michelle Lamoreaux	TBA	February 5, 2018
"From Pluto with Love": As the kids get ready for Valentines Day by making their own valentines out of paper, Mindy continues to feel sad that little, frozen Pluto is so far out at the edge of the Solar System. When Sydney shows Mindy a newly-downloaded, full-color image of Pluto as seen by the New Horizons spacecraft, Mindy is intrigued by Pluto's 'heart' of ice. Mindy once again feels that Pluto deserves our love, since it's no longer considered a planet, but is orbiting out there at the edge of the Solar System, like a big frozen Valentine. She asks Sydney to bring her own little hand-made Valentine to Pluto on her behalf. Sydney leads an expedition of the kids to Pluto to bring Mindy's Valentine, experience the frozen dwarf planet themselves, and bring back their report to Mindy. "A Star is Born": Sydney is directing the kids in a backyard movie, making her version of a Commander Cressida story about the formation of a star. The other kids all have parts, but Sunspot has the lead - as the star! The kids' movie coincides with the celebration of a star being born near (a.k.a. 10 light years away from) Bortron 7!
34	34	"The Mindysphere" "Lone Star"	Christie Insley Craig Bartlett	TBA	June 7, 2017
"The Mindysphere": Mindy's mom has gradually been giving Mindy permission to go a little bit farther in the neighborhood on her own, and Mindy is trying to map out exactly what her boundaries are. Sean compares her 'Mindysphere' to the helisophere-the boundaries of the Sun's influence. The kids get Celery to fly them out past the heliosphere into true interstellar space. Back on Earth, they make their own Voyager 1 (out of a wagon) and take Mindy to the outermost edges of the Mindysphere! "Lone Star": Sydney knows a lot about Boxwood Terrace's early history, and she tells Jet stories about a local pioneer who went by the nickname 'Lone Star.' He got that name because he was an early astronomer who liked the hills of Boxwood Terrace for their excellent views of the night sky, and built the first Observatory on the hill that now sits at the center of the Deep Space Array. As Jet imagines Sydney's story of Lone Star, the kids turn the story into a Western-flavored musical.
35	35	"Space Race" "Jet's Time Machine"	Joe Purdy Craig Bartlett	TBA	June 8, 2017
"Space Race": Jet, Sydney, Sean, and Sunspot join Celery as she competes against her brother, Uncle Zucchini, in an 'Earthie-style race with a winner'! The race is tight until Celery uses the kids' proposed secret 'strategy' - a 'gravity assist' off of Jupiter, to increase their saucer speed, and win! "Jet's Time Machine": Jet uses his Bortronian skills to test his first experimental Time machine so he and his Earthie friends can go back to an exact time - 3 minutes earlier - in order to see a spectacular moment in a meteor shower that they missed. A mistake happens the first time, so he keeps trying to go back in time to fix the first mistake, but more mistakes keep happening and snowball into hilarity.
36	36	"Sean's Neptune Tune" "Earth Day Birthday"	Rachel Lipman Michelle Lamoreaux	TBA	August 17, 2017
"Sean's Neptune Tune": Sean's nervousness about flying out to visit the remote Neptune is soothed by Jet's suggestion - an improvised, fun 'Neptune tune.' It works as our kids, Sunspot, and Celery fly to the faraway eighth planet! "Earthday Birthday": When the kids discover that they've missed all 63 of Jet's Bortronian birthdays, they decide to celebrate the one-year anniversary of him landing on Earth instead... with an 'Earthday birthday' surprise party!
37	37	"Castaway Carrot" "Jet Can't Sleep"	Joe Purdy Craig Bartlett	Meg Syverud; Charlotte Vevers	October 9, 2017
"Castaway Carrot": After an afternoon on the Moon, Celery, Jet, and Sunspot discover, as they fly to Earth, that they have mistakenly left Carrot on the Moon. Then the saucer malfunctions and they receive news of a possible solar storm headed their way. In a nail-biter, Jet and Sunspot do a mid-outer space repair job - as per Celery's instructions -with Carrot comically adapting to the Moon environment. In the end, the saucer is fixed, Carrot is rescued, and the solar storm heads in the opposite direction of the Moon. "Jet Can't Sleep": When a loud thunderstorm hits the neighborhood one evening, the Propulsions are woken up. They gather in the kitchen as the noisy storm rages on, and Jet is too excited to get back to sleep. Carrot, Celery, and Sunspot are sympathetic - they're in the same boat! During the night they all learn about Earth storms as compared to storms on other planets. And then they all try to get Jet to fall back asleep, a seemingly impossible task. They use more and more absurd methods, until Celery has a conventional Earthie solution: sing a lullaby.
38	38	"Holidays in Boxwood Terrace"	Craig Bartlett Joe Purdy	Meg Syverud; Charlotte Vevers	December 11, 2017
Jet pitches an idea for the annual Boxwood Terrace Christmas Pageant, and not only is it accepted, he gets to direct it! He casts Sean, Sydney, Mindy, and Sunspot as characters in the play, and hires Mitchell Peterson to help him find this elusive thing called 'Christmas Spirit.' Jet is looking for the Spirit of Christmas, something intangible that Sean and Sydney can't quite define. Mitchell wants to belong to the group, but doesn't know how to do it. Both kids get their answer in a heartfelt conclusion.
39	39	"Not a Sound" "Mindy in Space"	Michelle Lamoreaux Joe Purdy	Meg Syverud; Charlotte Vevers	October 10, 2017
"Not a Sound": The kids get information from Dr. Rafferty and then travel to outer space to confirm the amazing fact that there is no sound in outer space... even though Jet is convinced he's heard sounds all over the solar system. "Mindy in Space": After Mindy laments the fact that she's still only 4 and still can't go to space with the other kids, Sydney, Jet, Sean, and Sunspot plan a full makeshift, cobbled together 'Day in Space' in Jet's backyard. Mindy's day ends on a nearby hilltop where they all watch an actual space event - the Leonid Meteor Showers shooting across the sky.
40	40	"A Hammer and a Feather" "Commander Mom"	Craig Bartlett Rachel Lipman	Meg Syverud; Charlotte Vevers	February 6, 2018
"A Hammer and a Feather": Sydney shows Jet and Sean a cool experiment - dropping different items from the same height to see which reaches the ground first. That reminds Sean of a video he watched of an astronaut on the Moon dropping a hammer and a feather from the same height. They reach the ground at the same time. And the reason is atmosphere - or lack of it - on the Moon. Jet laughs - really? Wait, what's atmosphere? Well, the kids know the best way to find out - into the wagon/saucer! Our kids and Celery fly to the edge of the Earth's atmosphere to learn what it does... and then go to the Moon. Is the atmosphere around the Moon the same as the Earth's? And what happens when the kids do the hammer-feather drop on the lunar surface? "Commander Mom": Sydney brings Jet and Sean to the DSA to visit her mom, DR. AMY SKELLEY, and check out her work. Dr. Skelley is a robotics engineer who makes outer space robotic and gadget dreams a reality.

=== Season 2 (2018–19) ===
No. overall	No. in season	Title	Written by	Storyboard by	Original release date
41	1	"Mindy Turns Five"	Rachel Lipman and Craig Bartlett	Meg Syverud; Charlotte Vevers	April 2, 2018
Mindy has finally turned five and is super excited that she is now old enough to go to space. But she's planned a tea party in the backyard. The kids convince Mindy to move her tea party to the Moon! In her first trip to space ever, Mindy gets to board the Propulsion family saucer and experience space travel, rounding out their Moon tea party with a quick trip out to Pluto and back.
42	2	"Endless Summer" "Jet Shrinks the Kids"	Christie Insley Craig Bartlett	Meg Syverud; Charlotte Vevers	April 3, 2018
"Endless Summer": Jet is amazed to find out that the entire Earth doesn't have the same season at the same time. So he flies with Sydney and Sean from the northern hemisphere to the southern hemisphere to compare and experience holidays in winter and summer...all in one day! "Jet Shrinks the Kids": Mindy feels bad that she's the smallest kid in the group, so sympathetic Jet and friends use a shrink-ray and become her size. The plan goes awry, and Jet, Sean, Sydney, and Sunspot become the size of mice. Mindy has to follow intricate diagrams to reverse the shrink-ray.
43	3	"Mindy's Ice Rink" "Measure for Measure"	Craig Bartlett Michelle Lamoreaux	TBA	April 4, 2018
"Mindy's Ice Rink": Mindy is impatient for winter, because she wants to ice skate. So Jet, Sean, Sydney, and Celery fly to Saturn's icy rings to gather ice from them and return to build a Saturn-ringed skating rink around Jet's house. "Measure for Measure": Jet, Sydney, Sean, Mindy, and Sunspot decide to make a scaled replica of the solar system using found items in their own neighborhood and in doing so learn that an Astronomical Unit is the distance from the Earth to the Sun.
44	4	"Mindy and Carrot Bake" "Commander Cressida Begins"	Joe Purdy Rachel Lipman	TBA	April 5, 2018
"Mindy and Carrot Bake": While making a cake, Carrot and Mindy find they are one are short one ingredient, so they head to the store. But Carrot accidentally pushes a wrong button on the wagon's newly-updated control panel, and they take off into outer space! Using a diagram, methodical experimentation, and record keeping, Mindy and Carrot figure out how to properly fly the saucer back home, where they finally finish the cake. "Commander Cressida Begins": Mindy has a problem: now that she's been to space with the bigger kids, she realizes how much there is out there to see! How can she decide where to explore next? Sydney asks her mom, Dr. Skelley, who presents them with the very first edition of Commander Cressida comics! In reading the comic book, Mindy comes to appreciate that she, like Commander Cressida, can explore space "one adventure at a time."
45	5	"Mindy's Bedtime" "Galileo, Galileo!"	Rachel Lipman Craig Bartlett	TBA	April 6, 2018
"Mindy's Bedtime": Mindy has to go to bed when the Sun goes down, but she's having such a fun day with her friends. She asks Jet and the others to help her keep the Sun from going down. The older kids humor Mindy and try to help "slow down the Sun." All their efforts make Mindy so sleepy that she decides to go home and sleep. "Galileo, Galileo!": Sydney and Jet are having a hard time explaining to Mindy that the Sun doesn't move - the Earth is moving around the Sun, so the Sun seems to move. Then Sean comes over dressed as his science hero Galileo, getting ready to do a school report. Mindy asks "Galileo" to explain why the Sun seems to move, and Sean practices for his report by explaining how the planets move, in character as Galileo.
46	6	"Eye in the Sky" "Total Eclipse Block Party"	Rachel Lipman Craig Bartlett	TBA	June 6, 2018
"Eye in the Sky": Sean is planning his first sleepout under the stars with his Space Scouts troop, but the weather is threatening and it looks like his sleepout will be rained out. The kids get help from Mitchell, building a weather observation station to make a weather prediction, and visit the DSA for further help by tracking the weather with satellites. "Total Eclipse Block Party": A total eclipse of the Sun is coming to Boxwood Terrace! The kids prepare a Total Eclipse song and dance to perform at the DSA, where the whole town is gathered for the event. Meanwhile, Sunspot attempts to explain the eclipse to all the local animals so they won't think it's night and sleep through it.
47	7	"Souped-Up Saucer" "Pet Sounds"	Michelle Lamoreaux Joe Purdy	TBA	June 13, 2018
"Souped-Up Saucer": Celery has souped-up the family saucer, adding new features for the kids to use, including a robot arm. They test drive it with a trip to the Moon. "Pet Sounds": Jet takes care of Mitchell's dog Cody for the weekend, and attempts to teach him some new tricks.
48	8	"I Feel the Earth Move" "Zerk Visits Earth"	Michelle Lamoreaux Joe Purdy	TBA	June 20, 2018
"I Feel the Earth Move": When the kids experience an earthquake in Boxwood Terrace, Celery takes them up into space to study the Earth's plates and fault lines from above. "Zerk Visits Earth": Jet's overactive cousin Zerk comes to Earth for a visit, and the kids show him around the neighborhood.
49	9	"Asteroid Belt Space Race" "Sydney 2"	Craig Bartlett Rachel Lipman	TBA	June 27, 2018
"Asteroid Belt Space Race": The kids join Celery in a space race with Uncle Zucchini, Auntie Eggplant and Zerk. "Sydney 2": Sydney designs and builds a robot companion for Jet 2.
50	10	"Earth Wind & Flyer" "Mini-Golf At The DSA"	Joe Purdy Craig Bartlett	TBA	July 4, 2018
"Earth Wind & Flyer": Jet is fascinated by the effects of wind on his saucer. He and the kids study how wind works, ending with Sean going on a wild saucer ride. "Mini-Golf At The DSA": Jet is fascinated by Earthie golf, and Sean and Sydney try to teach him the rules. When the DSA builds a new mini-golf course, the kids team up against the grownups, and Jet gets to apply his new knowledge of force.
51	11	"Water, Water Everywhere" "Commander Cressida Story Contest"	Joe Purdy Rachel Lipman	TBA	July 11, 2018
"Water, Water Everywhere": Celery takes the kids on a saucer tour all around the Earth to discover all the ways that water can be found. They visit Antarctica to look at the ice, and then compare that extreme to the icy surface of Jupiter's moon Europa. "Commander Cressida Story Contest": Sydney wants to enter a Commander Cressida story contest, but can't think up a good enough story. The other kids help, and they come up with a story about lassoing a comet to bring water to Venus, and then Mars.
52	12	"Try and Try Again" "Racing on Sunshine"	Rachel Lipman Joe Purdy	TBA	July 18, 2018
"Try and Try Again": Jet's robot Jet 2 needs new wheels if he's going to be able to rove over the surface of Mars. Jet and the kids try a bunch of different wheels, without success. In the end, they borrow the wheels from Mitchell's scooter, so Jet 2 can successfully navigate on Mars. "Racing on Sunshine": The kids enter their karts in the big kid-kart derby, but this year they all have to design solar powered karts. Jet learns how solar panels work, and how batteries save up the energy so you can race even when clouds cover the Sun.
53	13	"You Can Call Me Albedo" "The Tide is High"	Christie Insley Rachel Lipman	TBA	July 25, 2018
"You Can Call Me Albedo": It's evening at the cul-de-sac, and the kids are looking at two asteroids through Sean's telescope - one is light-colored and one is dark. Meanwhile, Mitchell's dog Cody seems to have run away because he doesn't like the black sweater Mitchell put on him. The kids learn about how, just like asteroids, some things are easier to see in the dark than others, like a white card is easier to see than Cody's black sweater. This amount of brightness is called 'albedo'. "The Tide is High": The kids go to their local beach to surf, but notice that the beach looks completely different from the last time they stood there. There's way more sand, and the ocean is far away! They decide to be detectives and study what has happened, and learn that the larger and smaller beach is caused by the tides - the rising and falling of the ocean.
54	14	"That's One Gigantic Pumpkin, Jet Propulsion!"	Craig Bartlett and Joe Purdy	TBA	October 15, 2018
"That's One Gigantic Pumpkin, Jet Propulsion!": Jet is impatient and uses Bortronian technology to grow a pumpkin. However, the pumpkin becomes enormous and is too big to carry to the local Pumpkin Contest. Jet and his friends need to figure out a way to get it to the contest in time. At the same time, Mindy is going trick-or-treating with her two BFFs: Lillian and Mitchell. Mindy and Lillian think that Halloween is magical. Mitchell, on the other hand, has different opinions. Mindy tries to convince him that it is.
55	15	"Freebird" "Sean's Robotic Arm"	Joe Purdy Rachel Lipman	TBA	December 3, 2018
"Freebird": Some snow geese start to invade Jet's backyard. Jet and the gang are confused at first, but eventually learn that they are using the backyard as a stopping place while they migrate. "Sean's Robotic Arm": Mindy knocks Sean's prized Neil Armstrong action figure out of his hands and it ends up falling into a narrow crevice. Sean is very sad because of this. Luckily, Jet, Sydney, Mindy, Mitchell, Sunspot, and Cody all help him out by constructing a robotic arm made out of various items that will get Neil out of the hole.
56	16	"Ain't No Mars Mountain High Enough" "Treasure Map"	Joe Purdy Christie Insley	TBA	December 4, 2018
"Ain't No Mars Mountain High Enough": Sunspot wants to join an elite society called the Space Summit Society, so he needs to climb Mount Sharp, on Mars. The other kids accompany him on his quest to climb Mt. Sharp. At first, he rejects help from them, but he eventually learns the value of working together. "Treasure Map": Sean, Sydney, and Mindy are all going away, leaving Jet with Mitchell. Mitchell, inspired by Treasure Island, wants to dig for buried treasure in his backyard. Wanting to do something nice for Mitchell, Jet makes a treasure chest for Mitchell to find, and also makes a map, unbeknownst to Mitchell.
57	17	"Moon Face" "Lone Star 2 - Rocket Kids!"	Joe Purdy Craig Bartlett	TBA	December 5, 2018
"Moon Face": Mindy thinks there's a face on the moon. The kids investigate to see what causes the 'face' on the moon. "Lone Star 2 - Rocket Kids!": In this sequel to season 1's "Lone Star", the kids design a foot rocket while Sydney tells them about how Lone Star engineered and built the first rockets.
58	18	"Astronaut Ellen Ochoa"	Craig Bartlett, Rachel Lipman, Joe Purdy, Christie Insley	TBA	March 8, 2019
"Astronaut Ellen Ochoa": When Astronaut Ellen Ochoa comes to visit the DSA and review an engineering project, she runs into the kids, who are running Sean's lemonade stand to raise money for a rocket to Mars. They end up hanging out with her before her DSA meeting. They solve an engineering problem together, which inspires Ellen to use the same solution with the engineering project at the DSA.
59	19	"Potatoes on Mars" "Bortron Leprechaun"	Craig Bartlett	TBA	March 11, 2019
"Potatoes on Mars": Jet is fascinated by the Earthie potatoes that the kids have grown in the backyard garden. Now he wants to try to grow potatoes on Mars! They take several plants to Mars and try, but learn that potatoes need the right air, temperature, water, and even the right soil. "Bortron Leprechaun": Jet is fascinated by his first Earthie rainbow. He wants to know all about them! Sydney tells Jet about the mythical Leprechauns that keep a pot of gold at the end of the rainbow, and even though they explain that it's only a story, Jet insists on following the rainbow to its end and meeting a magical leprechaun.
60	20	"Who Messed Up the Treehouse?" "Fact or Fiction?"	Rachel Lipman Christie Insley	TBA	April 15, 2019
"Who Messed Up the Treehouse?": The kids do a bunch of projects in the treehouse. Sean makes paper airplanes, Jet has a picnic with Sunspot, Sydney makes Commander Cressida comics, and Mindy makes a puppet show. However, they leave a lot of trash there. No one wants to take responsibility for it. They try to find other places to play, but they don't work out. In the end, they learn to share the responsibility and keep the treehouse clean. "Fact or Fiction": Mindy tells Jet that clouds are made out of cotton balls. Jet, of course, believes this, but Sean and Sydney don't. Mindy says she learned this from Lillian. Lillian later clarifies that she thinks clouds are made of cotton candy, which Jet and Mindy also end up believing, much to Sean and Sydney's annoyance. The kids go to Dr. Rafferty and Dr. Skelley, who teach them what clouds are really made of and how to find correct information.
61	21	"Moon Circus" "Every Day is Earth Day"	Joe Purdy; Michelle Lamoreaux	TBA	April 16, 2019
"Moon Circus": It is Carrot's 250th birthday. The kids make a circus to celebrate. They tell Jet not to tell Carrot, but Carrot ends up finding out anyway. The kids can't do their stunts on Earth because of the high gravity, and Carrot strains his back while trying to do a famous flip of this. In the end, the decision is made to transfer the circus to the Moon, where everyone can do their circus tricks due to the low gravity. "Every Day is Earth Day": Today is Earth Day. The kids are making posters to celebrate. The kids travel around the Earth to find out what makes Earth so special. Then they use a Bortronian hot air balloon to get to the local DSA Earth Day celebration. Mitchell performs a poem about Earth. Carrot mixes up "toaster" and "poster" and presents a toaster, much to Mr. Peterson's annoyance. The kids arrive in their hot air balloon, and Jet leads everyone in a big song about Earth.
62	22	"My Three Suns" "Magnet, P.I."	Rachel Lipman Joe Purdy	TBA	April 17, 2019
"My Three Suns": The kids play shadow tag, but then the clouds cover the sun, making it so that they can't play shadow tag. Then, the kids learn about a planet with 3 suns, Proxima B. They are glad to live on a planet with just one sun. Meanwhile, Face 9000 tries to take up comedy. "Magnet, P.I.": Sean becomes a magician called the Great Seanzo and dazzles the other kids with magnet tricks.
63	23	"Sunspot's Sunspot" "Our Sun is a Star!"	Craig Bartlett Rachel Lipman	TBA	April 18, 2019
"Sunspot's Sunspot": Sunspot is sick and acts weird. This is because of a big sunspot on the Sun. He gets cured when he gets closer to the sunspot. "Our Sun is a Star!": Lillian has a sleepover with Mindy planned, but it's too cold to have a sleepover outside. The kids learn about stars.
64	24	"Mars Rock for Mom" "Sean Has a Cold"	Rachel Lipman	TBA	May 6, 2019
"Mars Rock for Mom": On Mother's Day, Jet realizes that he left Jet 2 on Mars and he and his friends travel there to recover him. "Sean Has a Cold": Sean gets sick on the first windy day of Spring and misses out on kite flying with his friends.

== Films (2017–23) ==
No.	Title	Original release date
1	"Back to Bortron 7"	August 14, 2017
When Jet's parents need to return to their home planet, Sean and Sydney join the Propulsion family for an epic adventure to Bortron 7.
2	"One Small Step"	June 17, 2019
Jet builds a new super saucer that the kids use to travel to the Moon to commemorate the 50th anniversary of the Apollo 11 mission.
3	"Space Camp"	July 20, 2023
When Sunspot develops an allergic reaction, Jet must leave Space Camp in order to find a cure.
