= Ready Jet Go! =

American animated educational children's television series

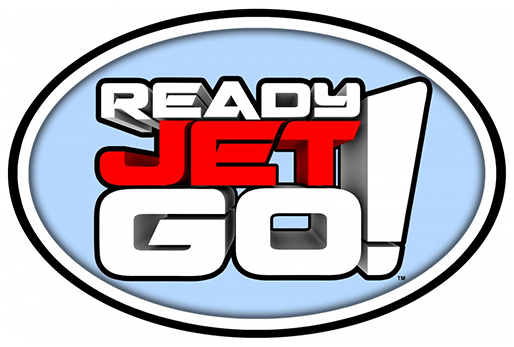
- Genre: Educational
- Created by: Craig Bartlett
- Directed by: Craig Bartlett; Rusty Tracy; Zac Palladino
- Voices of: Ashleigh Ball; Dalila Bela; Vienna Leacock; William Ainscough; Grady Ainscough; Jaeda Lily Miller; Kyle Rideout; Meg Roe; Brian Drummond
- Theme music composer: Mike Himelstein; Jim Lang
- Opening theme: "Ready Jet Go!"
- Ending theme: "Ready Jet Go!" (instrumental)
- Composer: Jim Lang
- Country of origin: United States
- Original language: English
- No. of seasons: 2
- No. of episodes: 67 (list of episodes)

Production
- Executive producers: Craig Bartlett; Dete Meserve; David McFadzean; Matt Williams
- Production companies: Snee-Oosh, Inc.; Wind Dancer Films

Original release
- Network: PBS Kids
- Release: February 15, 2016 – May 6, 2019
- Release: August 14, 2017 – July 20, 2023

Ready Jet Go! is an American animated educational children's television series created by Craig Bartlett and produced by Wind Dancer Films that aired on PBS Kids from February 15, 2016, to May 6, 2019. Produced in cooperation with NASA's Jet Propulsion Laboratory, the show teaches science and astronomy.

The show is aimed at children ages 3 to 8. On August 17, 2016, PBS Kids announced the renewal of the series for a second season, which premiered on April 2, 2018.

== Plot ==
Jet Propulsion and his family are aliens from the planet Bortron 7, which orbits around a red dwarf called Bortron. The Bortronians largely resemble humans, but have elastic bodies. The Propulsion family lives at Boxwood Terrace in Washington state, where they study human customs and Earth environments for a travel guide. Jet has made friends with neighborhood children, including Sydney, Mindy and Sean, whose parents work at the nearby Deep Space Array. The Propulsions' car turns into a flying saucer, which they frequently use to take the older children into space. Their alien identities are known to Sean, Mindy and Sydney, but they otherwise make some effort to conceal their origin. However, a boy named Mitchell Peterson who lives next door is in on Jet's alien behavior and wants to expose his identity.

At the end of each episode, scientist Amy Mainzer (also called Astronomer Amy) hosts educational interstitial segments: the segments are not included in the export version.

== Episodes ==
Season	Segments	Episodes	Originally released	
Season	Segments	Episodes	First released	Last released
1	77	40	February 15, 2016	February 6, 2018
2	45	24	April 2, 2018	May 6, 2019
Films	—N/a	3	August 14, 2017	July 20, 2023

== Characters ==
=== Main ===
==== Bortronians ====
- Jet Propulsion (voiced by Ashleigh Ball) is the title character of the series. He sees the mundane world as a vast and exciting place, and even thinks that words are exciting, such as "surprise", claiming it to be a funny Earth word. He is named after the Jet Propulsion Laboratory.
- Sunspot Propulsion is the Propulsion family's pet. He has a kangaroo-like body, rabbit-like ears, and a raccoon-like tail. Sunspot knows how to read, can talk and sing, and can follow conversations, but often seems confused about what behaviors are expected from a pet.
- Carrot Propulsion (voiced by Kyle Rideout) is Celery's husband and Jet's father. He often stays home while Celery takes the kids on adventures into outer space, as he does not like traveling in the flying saucer. Carrot often cooks wacky dishes such as deep-fried lollipops.
- Celery Propulsion (voiced by Meg Roe) is Carrot's wife and Jet's mother. Celery is smart and often takes the kids to space. She normally drives the family vehicle, as Carrot's driving makes her nervous.
- Face 9000 (voiced by Brian Drummond) is a computer who helps answer the kids' science questions. In "Face on the Fritz", he gets an upgrade. He has a tendency to get jealous easily.

==== Earthies ====
Collective name for Earth natives used by the Bortronians.

- Sydney Skelley (voiced by Dalila Bela in season 1, Vienna Leacock in "Back to Bortron 7" and season 2) is a girl with black hair and green eyes. She idolizes a character named Commander Cressida, named after the moon of Uranus, who has a dog named Sirius, named after the brightest star in Earth's night sky. Sydney is imaginative and very friendly, often acting as the voice of reason for the kids.
- Sean Rafferty (voiced by William Ainscough (seasons 1-Our Sun is a Star!), Grady Ainscough (in You Can Call Me Albedo-Moon Face), Glen Gordon (in Lone Star 2 - Rocket Kids!-One Small Step), Anthony Bolognese (Space Camp) is a boy who is smart and wants to be an astronaut when he grows up, but he has slight claustrophobia. Sean idolizes Neil Armstrong and has an action figure of Armstrong, which he takes along on space trips.
- Mindy Melendez (voiced by Jaeda Lily Miller) is a girl who is friends with the Propulsion family, but was initially not allowed to travel to space with them. In the second season, Mindy turns five years old and is allowed to travel into space.

=== Supporting ===
==== Bortronians ====
- Zucchini (voiced by Ian James Corlett) is Jet's maternal uncle, Zerk's father, Eggplant's husband and Celery's brother. He is a garbage collector on Bortron and works for the East Galaxy Garbage Company, Bortron 7 Division, using the Big Bortronian Junk Sucker (BBJS).
- Moonbeam is Zucchini's pet. She looks similar to Sunspot, but Moonbeam is blue and plays electric guitar (left-handed).
- Eggplant (voiced by Tabitha St. Germain) is Jet's aunt, Zucchini's wife and Zerk's mother. She is an intergalactic travel writer just like Carrot and Celery.
- Zerk (voiced by Meg Roe) is Zucchini and Eggplant's son and Jet's cousin.
- Spinach is Celery's cousin. Celery calls him when the van/flying saucer is not working and she needs advice.

==== Earthies ====
- Mitchell Peterson (voiced by Spencer Drever in season 1, David Raynolds in season 2, Dylan Schombing in One Small Step, Gordon Cormier in Space Camp) is suspicious of the Propulsions' behavior and always wants to expose Jet's alien identity, but inevitably fails. In "Holidays in Boxwood Terrace", it is revealed that he only pretends to be mean, is really shy and wants to be friends with Jet, Sean, Sydney, and Mindy, but did not know how to go about doing so. In the end, the kids welcome him into their group.
- Mr. Peterson (voiced by Ian James Corlett) is Mitchell's father and the self-appointed safety officer for the neighborhood. He, like his son, can be a bit full of himself. He is an expert at playing mini-golf.
- Dr. Rafferty (voiced by Keegan Connor Tracy) is a scientist and Sean's mother.
- Dr. Bergs (voiced by Brian Drummond) is Dr. Rafferty's coworker.
- Dr. Melendez (voiced by Meg Roe) is Mindy's mother.
- Lillian (voiced by Amelia Shoichet Stoll) is a friend of Mindy's. The two girls dig a small "Grand Canyon" in a sandbox while the Propulsions and the other children visit Valles Marineris on Mars.
- Beep is a robot who lives at the Deep Space Array (DSA). She has a twin sister, Boop, who is a Rover on Mars.
- Dr. Skelley (voiced by Brenda Crichlow) is Sydney's mom, who also works at the DSA. Like her daughter, she is also a fan of Commander Cressida. She is a robotics engineer.

=== Space Camp ===
- The Great Galacto (voiced by Mark Oliver) is Jet's idol. He's a TV and web personality who goes on daring space adventures. Like Sunspot, he is allergic to comet dust, which causes him to shrink.
- Stella Singularity (voiced by Viva Lee) was the Great Galacto's number-one fan until Jet took her place. Stella got jealous, and went to planet Earth to confront Jet, but winded up going to space camp, and was placed on Mitchell's team. Stella is sarcastic and narcissistic; she always wants to be the best at everything, does not understand teamwork, and is frequently seen primping herself. When she got stuck in a web in the caverns of Mascarpone, she realized the value of teamwork. From that point on, she apologizes to Jet for how she acted and is nicer to him and the others from that point on.
- Dr. Chandra (voiced by Ana Sani) is an astronomer and "expert on alien life", who visited Boxwood Terrace to judge the spaceship design contest at space camp. Mitchell tried to tell her that Jet is an alien, but to no avail.
- Aurora (voiced by Diana Tsoy) and Houston (voiced by Gabriel Jacob-Cross) are two kids who invite Mitchell and Stella to join their team. They love space, and emphasize the importance of teamwork.

== Development ==
The idea for the show dates back to the late 1990s when Linda Simensky complained to Bartlett about how "nobody makes shows about two friends anymore". From that idea, Bartlett came up with Lenny and Nate, a buddy comedy starring two eighth-graders, one of whom believes he is an alien. It was pitched to Cartoon Network. Years later, while working on Dinosaur Train, Bartlett revamped the idea to be educationally appropriate for PBS, with a specific focus on space and earth science, after he worked on a project for NASA called the Shuttle Launch Experience. Lenny became Jet and Nate became Sean, while both characters were aged down from 13 to 10. The character of Sydney was added, and after testing the initial pilot of children, Mindy was added to appeal to a younger audience. The pilot was titled Jet Propulsion.

During production of the first season, PBS approved of everything that Bartlett and his team came up with, leaving no notes. However, during the second season, the team was approached by the Ready-to-Learn Act, thus bringing a new layer of oversight and executive meddling that made the second season "hard".

== Songs ==
Ready Jet Go! has many songs; some have no lyrics.

1. Ready Jet Go! Theme Song
2. Commander Cressida Theme
3. How Come the Moon Has Craters?
4. Night of a Bazillion Stars
5. The Scientific Method Song
6. The Solar System Song
7. Venus! (Earth's Broiling Hot Twin)
8. Tiny Blue Dot
9. Intergalactic Travel Writers
10. The Milky Way
11. What Goes Up (Must Come Down) aka The Gravity Song
12. Enceladus vs. Europa aka Which Moon is Best?
13. Computers aka The Programming Ditty
14. Let's Fly Our Little Saucer to the Moon
15. The 3-Part Bortronian Meal aka Classic 3-Part Bortronian Meal
16. My Name is Mindy
17. Try Again
18. Beep's a Rovin' Superstar aka Jet's Beep Song
19. Cooking with Jet (no lyrics)
20. Asteroid Belt (no lyrics)
21. Building Boogie (no lyrics)
22. So Many Moons aka 67 Moons
23. Real Bortronian Deal
24. Bortronian is What I Am!
25. My Name is Jet
26. Lone Star!
27. I'm Not Afraid of Big Ideas
28. A Scientific Town
29. Is Your Planet Like My Planet?
30. There's No Planet Like My Planet
31. Take-off Ditty
32. The Bortron Solar System Song
33. That's How We Roll on Bortron 7
34. Just Add Water
35. It's a Neptune Kind of Day!
36. Earthday Birthday
37. You're Never Too Big for a Lullaby
38. Dear Santa, From Little Billy
39. Mindy's Toy-Building Ditty
40. Solar System Saucer-Sleigh
41. The Spirit of Christmas
42. Dear Little Frozen Pluto
43. A Star is Born!
44. I'm Finally Five!
45. The Outer Planets Song
46. Ice Skating in July
47. Heliocentric Ditty
48. Total Eclipse of the Sun
49. Space Racin'
50. Grow Plant, Grow!
51. Engineering Song
52. Potatoes on Mars
53. Potato Changes
54. Get Growin'
55. Every Day is Earth Day
56. The Super Saucer Song
57. Dear Great Galacto
58. Brother From Another Sunspot Mother
59. Super Hyperdrive
60. It Takes a Team
61. Space Hero

== Broadcast ==
Due to the national success of Ready Jet Go!, the series has been distributed to countries around the world and dubbed into over 20 different languages, enabling it to become internationally successful as well.

In September 2016, the series premiered in Canada on Knowledge Network during the Knowledge Kids programming block. It also has aired on BBC Kids there. In November of that same year, the series premiered in South Korea on EBS1. The Korean dub of the show was the first foreign-language dub to be produced and aired.

On January 25, 2017, the series started premiering in Israel on Educational 23, and later on Kan Educational until November 14, 2020. On February 24 of that same year, the series premiered on Yle TV2 in Finland as part of the Pikku Kakkonen block, under the title Jetron matkaan. Latin American Spanish and Brazilian Portuguese dubs later premiered on Nat Geo Kids that same year, with the Spanish dub premiering on July 1 and the Portuguese dub on September 20.

In January 2017, the series premiered on LTV1 in Latvia. The show is broadcast in English with one man translating all the characters’ lines to Latvian in the form of a voiceover. On April 13, 2019, the second season premiered.

Beginning February 17, 2021, the series began broadcasting on television in Russia. That same year, the series premiered June 28 on TV Derana in Sri Lanka with a Sinhala dub, and September 27 on Aqlvoy in Uzbekistan under the title Diqqat Jet Olg’a!

== Reception ==
=== Critical reception ===
Emily Ashby of Common Sense Media rated it a 5/5, saying "Thoroughly engaging and packed with educational content, this exceptional series is a fun way for kids to learn about science and astronomy. Jet's excitement for the human experience is matched only by Sean and Sydney's eagerness to learn all about outer space; put the three of them together, and it's a true celebration of the joy of discovery. Whether it's executing a rescue mission for a Mars rover or combining daily chores with experiments in force, Jet and his friends have a lot to teach kids through their own experiences."

Gina Catanzarite of Parent's Choice said "Although the vocabulary and science explanations may be beyond the scope of the youngest viewers, the premise, characters, interesting art direction and upbeat action should hold their attention. Older kids are more likely to grasp the facts and even if they don't remember them all, Ready Jet Go! will at the very least inspire curiosity, and plenty of questions when they take the time to gaze up at the skies above them."

=== Ratings ===
The series has gained 34.3 million viewers, according to PBS, including 10.2 million on broadcast television. It outperformed channel average by 32% in its first three weeks. The series has also been streamed over 146 million times on the PBS Kids website and app since January 2016.

=== Awards and nominations ===
- The series was awarded a Parents' Choice Silver Honor.
  - The series won a Parents' Choice Award again in 2018.
  - The online game Jet's Bot Builder won the 2019 Parent's Choice Silver Award.
- The series was awarded a Common Sense Seal by Common Sense Media.
- Jaeda Lily Miller was nominated for a Young Artist Award for her performance as Mindy
- Cynopsis Kids Imagination Awards:
  - 2017: Nominated for Best Use of Music in a Kids Series, Educational Series/Special – STEM, Mobile App – Preschool, Preschool Series, and won Song for a TV Series/Special/Movie, tied with Splash and Bubbles.
  - 2018: Won Best Use of Music in a Kids' Series, tied with Wonderama, Online Game tied with The Loud House: Lights Out, and was nominated for Preschool Series or Special.
- Back to Bortron 7 was nominated for an Environmental Media Award for Children's Television.
- The Space Scouts app was a 2020 Webby Award honoree.
- At the 2017 KidsScreen Awards, the Space Explorer app was nominated for Best Learning App—Smartphone, and the show's website was nominated for Best Website.

== Film ==
In 2021, two years after the show's final episode aired, Bartlett confirmed that new songs were being recorded for the series. A year later, he confirmed on The Arun Mehta Show podcast that the songs were for an 80-minute Ready Jet Go! movie in production for Universal Pictures. The film was in animation up until October 2022, and entered post-production in spring 2023. The movie, entitled Ready Jet Go!: Space Camp, premiered on July 20, 2023, serving as the series finale.

The plot of the movie revolves around Jet and the rest of Team Propulsion heading to Space Camp. However, Sunspot develops an allergic reaction, prompting the team to go on an intergalactic adventure to find the cure and return to Space Camp before Mitchell finds out.

== Games ==
PBS Kids and Two Moos created ten online games based on the show:

1. Sydney's Astro-Tracker
2. Mindy's Constellation Exploration
3. Sean's Rescue Quest
4. Jet's Planet Pinball
5. Jet's Rocket Ship Creator
6. Mission Earth
7. Mindy's Moonball
8. Jet's Bot Builder
9. Rover Maker
10. Cooking School
11. Food Farmer
12. Base Builder
13. Mission Control
14. Space Scouts Lab
15. Space Scouts (Game/Achievement Hub with trans-game awards for Space Scouts Games)

Also on iTunes:

1. Space Explorer released 7 April 2016
