= Good Sam (2019 film) =

2019 American drama film

- Directed by: Kate Melville
- Written by: Teena Booth; Dete Meserve
- Based on: Good Sam by Dete Meserve
- Produced by: Dete Meserve; Jesse Prupas
- Starring: Tiya Sircar; Chad Connell; Marco Grazzini; Jesse Camacho; Mark Camacho
- Cinematography: Eric Cayla
- Edited by: Isabelle Levesque
- Music by: Mario Sevigny
- Production companies: Muse Entertainment; Wind Dancer Films
- Distributed by: Netflix
- Release date: May 16, 2019
- Running time: 90 minutes
- Country: United States

Good Sam is a 2019 American-Canadian drama film. The film is a Netflix Original based on Dete Meserve's book of the same name and follows the events of the happenings surrounding an unknown good Samaritan ("Good Sam") who leaves cash on seemingly random doorsteps. The investigative news reporter Kate Bradley (Tiya Sircar) tries to find out Good Sam's true identity.

== Plot ==
Kate is a NYC TV reporter for Channel 12 who normally covers the 'bummer beat' (disasters and tragedies) stumbles upon a story about a series of mysterious, seemingly unconnected $100,000 donations. Soon the donor is dubbed Good Sam, short for samaritan.

The first recipient, Christina, is an older woman who recently had a lot of financial problems. The second, Maria, is a wealthy oncologist, who plans on donating it towards research. The third, Jesse, is a carpenter, recovering financially from a work-related accident. And the fourth, Faith, is a paralegal, who needs it to further her education.

A clue leads Kate to Eric Hayes’ apartment, the firefighter who saved her from injury at a recent fire. It's considered a dead end because she was looking for his brother Patrick, who had recently died in a sailing accident.

One of the many who have contacted Channel 12 about the Good Sam story, Sylvia, sends a video appeal for her mother, who needs expensive medical attention not covered by their insurance. Sylvia later receives money from Good Sam, and simultaneously, Kate receives text messages telling her to meet up with Sylvia's family, so Kate interviews them on camera.

Yet another anonymous text message asks her to meet up with ‘Good Sam’ alone and with no camera. There, Kate is shocked to find Jack Hansen, a hedge fund manager she had met through her politician father, claiming to be him.

Jack does an exclusive interview with Kate on Channel 12 about being Good Sam, during which he tells her he wanted to share an unusually highly profitable investment with people struggling financially. The two go out to eat afterwards, but moments after the interview is aired, Channel 9 finds them and asks Jack about being Good Sam. His response sounds almost identical to the one he gave Kate in their interview, which she finds suspicious.

Confronting him, Jack says that he may have "over-prepared" for the interview. The following day, when Kate takes him to see one of the first people to receive the 100,000, he changes his story about her. That evening, at a dinner party, Kate discovers that Jack is running for Congress, realizing he was just using the Good Sam persona as a tactic for his campaign.

Kate goes to Eric’s for dinner, where she notices a photograph of him, his brother Patrick, and a man with a cap covering his face and a tattoo on his forearm, whom he explains was a friend of his brother. Eric then explains he hasn't sailed since his brother died while they were sailing together. He feels guilty for not being able to save him.

Kate discovers that Jack did give away $100,000 to each of the last four people, but someone else was the original Good Sam. She does more research into the first four candidates, first face-to-face with Jesse. She discovers how he is connected to Patrick, because she recognises his forearm tattoo from a photo with the Hayes brothers in Camden, ME.

Jesse then tells her that Patrick had been his best friend, he grew up with him and worked on his sailboat, the Crazy 8 (the 8 on the bags). Christina had babysat the Hayes boys, Marie had successfully treated Patrick's cancer and Faith had helped the dyslexic Patrick. Approaching Eric, he explains that he received the $400,000 from the insurance policy for the wrecked sailboat, so wanted to give the money to people who'd impacted Patrick's life.

The next day, Kate outs Jack on air, and shows how Good Sam inspired his recipients, Christina buying her neighbour a car, Marie donating hers to cancer research, Jesse giving a portion of his to a food bank and Faith setting up a scholarship.

One month later Kate and Eric are in a relationship. A college-aged student approaches them to say thank you, as a good Samaritan is paying many students tuitions.

== Cast ==
- Tiya Sircar as Kate Bradley
- Chad Connell as Eric Hayes
- Marco Grazzini as Jack Hansen
- Jesse Camacho as Josh, Kate's cameraman
- Mark Camacho as David Dyal, Kate's boss
- Elana Dunkelman as Lauren, a reporter
- Kelly Hope Taylor as Susan Andrews
- Kenny Wong as Ed
- Daniela Sandiford as Alex
- Christina Tannous as Christina Gomez
- Ivan Smith as Senator Ashok Bradley, Kate's father
- Stefanie Nakamura as a Channel 9 News Reporter
- Scott Humphrey as a Channel 3 News Reporter
- Jodie Lynn Resther as Faith Haywood
- Vince Benvenuto as Jesse Durham
- Nick Walker as Tyler Nesbit
- Mylėne Dinh-Robic as Marie Ellis, Patrick's doctor
- Brittany Drisdelle as Hostess
- Robert Crooks as Patrick, Eric's late brother (Photo)

== Reception ==
On the review aggregator website Rotten Tomatoes, 15% of 6 critics' reviews are positive.

It has mixed reviews on other websites, including the Daily Dot and Wherever I Look. Decider simply declares: SKIP IT. Good Sam has been praised for having a diverse cast with a lead who is good at her job, both as a reporter in the movie and an actress. It has been criticized for being too light on plot and having generic characters with little to no backstory.
