= Double Wedding (2010 film) =

- Screenplay by: Jennifer C. Maisel
- Directed by: Craig Pryce
- Starring: Tamera Mowry; Tia Mowry
- Theme music composer: Lawrence Shragge
- Country of origin: United States
- Original language: English

Production
- Producer: Deborah Marks
- Cinematography: John Berrie
- Editor: Mark Sanders
- Running time: 88 minutes
- Production company: Jaffe / Braunstein Enterprise

Original release
- Network: Lifetime
- Release: June 20, 2010

Double Wedding is a 2010 American television film directed by Craig Pryce and starring Tia Mowry and Tamera Mowry.

== Plot ==
Danielle and Deanna Warren are twin sisters with different careers and personalities. The one thing they have in common is that they are looking for Mr. Right. Sure enough, the handsome Tate enters the picture and swoons both sisters, though he believes they're the same woman. At the same time, the twins have no idea that the man they're seeing is one and the same. So, when they invite him to meet the family on the same date, complications arise.

== Cast ==
- Tamera Mowry as Danielle Warren
- Tia Mowry as Deanna Warren
- O. T. Fagbenle as Tate
- Chad Connell as Jasper Cooper
- Jackie Richardson
- Ardon Bess
- Robin Brûlé
- Sandra Caldwell as Holly
- Tonya Lee Williams

== Production ==
Filming occurred in Toronto.

== Reception ==
Grace Montgomery of Common Sense Media awarded the film two stars out of five.
