= Dete Meserve =

American television executive

Dete Meserve is an American film and television producer and author. Through her company, Silver Creek Falls Entertainment, Meserve produces television and film projects through her company.

== Producing career ==
Meserve is the producer of the animated film Carnival of the Animals, based on Camille Saint-Saëns' composition, in collaboration with Gustavo Dudamel, set to air on PBS Kids on November 16, 2026. She is also the Executive Producer of Apple TV+’s Not A Box, based on Antoinette Portis’ picture book of the same name. The series received nominations for an Annie Award and two Kidscreen Awards and was in official competition at the 2026 Annecy Film Festival. Meserve also serves as Executive Producer and Showrunner of PBS Kids’ Weather Hunters, an animated series produced in collaboration with Al Roker. The series’ accolades include 2026 Excellence in Early Learning Digital Media Award from the Association for Library Service to Children, an NAACP Image Award nomination for Outstanding Children's Animated Program, a Telly Award for Outstanding Animated Series, and a Television Critics Association nomination for Outstanding Achievement in Children's Television.

Meserve’s executive producer credits include 64 episodes of the PBS kids animated series Ready Jet Go! (2019) and its specials One Small Step (2016) and Ready Jet Go! Back to Bortron 7 (2019). She also produced the feature film Ready Jet Go! Space Camp (2023) for Universal/DreamWorks.

Meserve's television producer credits also include producing the films Good Sam (2019), What Men Want (2019), and Bernie (2011), as well as serving as Executive Producer on the television series Saint George (2014) with George Lopez and the nature documentary series Wildest Africa. She also worked as an executive on Meserve was a producer on Where the Heart Is (2000) and What Women Want (2000).

== Community involvement ==
Rotary International’s Good Sam Award is named after Meserve’s novel Good Sam. The award, given annually since 2021, commemorates leadership embodying values of compassion and kindness. Meserve was the inaugural recipient; subsequent honorees include Jack McBrayer (2023), LeVar Burton (2024), and Holly Robinson Peete (2025). Meserve served as the Los Angeles Children's Chorus' Chairman of the Board from 2022 to 2026.

== Writing career ==
Meserve is the author of five novels, as well as co-author of the nonfiction book Random Acts of Kindness, cowritten with Rachel Greco. Meserve’s debut novel Good Sam (2014) was adapted as a film for Netflix in 2019, with Meserve serving as producer and screenwriter. Good Sam won the 2020 Gold Medal from Living Now Book Awards.

Meserve’s other books include the Good Sam sequels Perfectly Good Crime (2016) and The Good Stranger (2020). Her fourth novel, a standalone titled The Space Between, was published by Lake Union Publishing in 2018. Her fifth novel, The Memory Collectors, was nominated for a Goodreads Choice Award in 2019. Meserve's sixth novel, the speculative mystery The Last Time She Saw Them, will be published by Poisoned Pen Press in 2027. Additionally, Meserve has written for CrimeReads and Space.com.

== Memberships ==
Meserve is a member of the Producers Guild of America, the Writers Guild of America, the Television Academy, and the Writers Guild of Canada.

== Speaking engagements ==
Meserve's speaking engagements include events with Rotary Club chapters throughout Southern California, Bouchercon, the Bentonville Film Festival, Kidscreen, and the World Animation Summit. She was an instructor for Rosemont College's Creative Writing MFA program.

Meserve served as onstage host of the 2024 Total Solar Eclipse event at the Cotton Bowl in Dallas, Texas, cohosting with Dr. Amy Mainzer in partnership with NASA, NOAA, and NSF.

== Personal life ==
Originally a native of Chicago, Illinois, Meserve lives in Los Angeles with her husband and three children. She was a 2022 nominee for Los Angeles Times' Inspirational Women and Leadership award.

== Bibliography ==
=== Fiction ===
- Good Sam (Kate Bradley Mystery #1, 2014)
- Perfectly Good Crime (Kate Bradley Mystery #2, 2016)
- The Space Between (2018)
- The Good Stranger (Kate Bradley Mystery #3, 2020)
- The Memory Collectors (2025)

=== Non-Fiction ===
- Random Acts of Kindness (with Rachel Greco, 2019)

== Filmography ==
=== Films ===
- Where the Heart Is (2000) – Production Executive for Wind Dancer Films
- What Women Want (2000) – Production Executive for Wind Dancer Films
- Walker Payne (2006) – Producer
- Bernie (2011) – Producer
- As Cool As I Am (2013) – Producer
- The Keeping Room (2014) – Producer
- What Men Want (2019) – Executive Producer
- Good Sam (2019) – Producer, Writer, Author

=== Television ===
- Home Improvement (1991–1999) – Production Executive for Wind Dancer Films
- Wildest Africa (2006) – Executive Producer
- Saint George (2014) – Executive Producer
- Ready Jet Go! (2016–2019) – Executive Producer
- Ready Jet Go!: Back to Bortron 7 (2017) – Executive Producer
- Ready Jet Go!: One Small Step (2019) – Executive Producer
- Ready Jet Go!: Space Camp (2023) – Producer
- Not a Box (2025) – Executive Producer
- Weather Hunters (2025) – Showrunner, Executive Producer
- Hey A.J.! (2026) - Showrunner, Executive Producer
