= Rugrats (franchise) =

Nickelodeon media franchise about talking babies

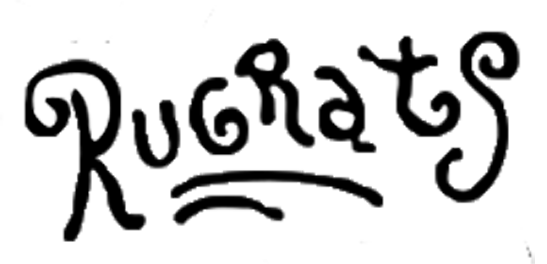
- Created by: Arlene Klasky; Gábor Csupó; Paul Germain
- Owners: Nickelodeon Group (Skydance)
- Years: 1991–present

Print publications
- Books: Let My Babies Go! A Passover Story (1998); The Rugrats Files (2000–02)
- Comic strip: Rugrats (1998–2003)

Films and television
- Films: The Rugrats Movie (1998); Rugrats in Paris: The Movie (2000); Rugrats Go Wild (2003)^{*}
- Animated series: Rugrats (1991–2004); All Grown Up! (2003–2008); Rugrats Pre-School Daze (2005); Rugrats (2021–2026)
- Television specials: Tommy Pickles and the Great White Thing (1990 unaired pilot); "Runaway Reptar" (1999); All Growed Up (2001)^{**}

Theatrical presentations
- Play: Rugrats: A Live Adventure

Games
- Video games: Rugrats Adventure Game (1998); Rugrats: Search for Reptar (1998); The Rugrats Movie (1998); Rugrats: Scavenger Hunt (1999); Rugrats: Time Travelers (1999); Rugrats: Studio Tour (1999); Rugrats: Totally Angelica (2000); Rugrats in Paris: The Movie (2000); Rugrats: Castle Capers (2001); Rugrats: All Growed-Up (2001); Rugrats: I Gotta Go Party (2002); Rugrats: Royal Ransom (2002); All Grown Up!: Express Yourself (2004); Nicktoons Racing (2000)^{***}; Nickelodeon Party Blast (2002)^{***}; Nicktoons: Freeze Frame Frenzy (2004)^{***}; Nickelodeon Kart Racers (2018)^{***}; Nickelodeon Kart Racers 2: Grand Prix (2020)^{***}; Nickelodeon All-Star Brawl (2021)^{***}
- ^{*} Crossover with The Wild Thornberrys^{**} Backdoor pilot for All Grown Up!^{***} Crossover appearance in a video game

Rugrats is an American animated media franchise created by Klasky Csupo consisting of television shows, films, video games, and other entries. It commenced in 1991 with the premiere of the television series of the same name. The franchise revolves around the adventures of a group of toddler (tweenage to teenage in All Grown Up!) friends who learn about the world and their relationship to it.

== Television shows ==
Series	Season	Episodes	Originally released	
Series	Season	Episodes	First released	Last released
Rugrats (1991)	Pilot		August 7, 2001 (VHS)	
Rugrats (1991)	1	25	August 11, 1991	December 22, 1991
Rugrats (1991)	2	51	September 13, 1992	May 23, 1993
Rugrats (1991)	3	51	September 26, 1993	April 13, 1995
Rugrats (1991)	4	28	December 4, 1996	November 22, 1997
Rugrats (1991)	5	37	May 29, 1998	February 20, 1999
Rugrats (1991)	6	52	February 27, 1999	July 20, 2001
Rugrats (1991)	7	36	January 15, 2001	April 10, 2004
Rugrats (1991)	8	23	July 21, 2001	November 11, 2003
Rugrats (1991)	9	24	September 21, 2002	August 1, 2004
Rugrats (1991)	Tales from the Crib	2	September 6, 2005	September 5, 2006
All Grown Up!	Pilot movie		July 21, 2001	
All Grown Up!	1	15	April 12, 2003	August 28, 2004
All Grown Up!	2	10	June 4, 2004	February 12, 2005
All Grown Up!	3	10	December 7, 2004	July 16, 2005
All Grown Up!	4	10	October 10, 2005	November 20, 2007
All Grown Up!	5	10	November 21, 2007	August 17, 2008
Rugrats Pre-School Daze	1	4	July 25, 2005	July 28, 2005
Rugrats (2021)	1	25	May 27, 2021	April 15, 2022
Rugrats (2021)	2	26	April 14, 2023	March 22, 2024
Rugrats (2021)	3	14	June 1, 2026 (Note: Premiered internationally on Nickelodeon Global; no plans for domestic release have been announced)	June 14, 2026

== Films ==
=== Animated ===
==== The Rugrats Movie (1998) ====
The story escalates when Tommy Pickles is put into difficult situation with the birth of his new brother, Dil, who will not stop crying and is taking all of their parents' attention. Lil and Phil suggest that Dil should be returned to the hospital, though Tommy and Chuckie object. They eventually get into the Reptar Wagon, take a high-speed ride straight into the deep woods where they get lost. The babies must find their way home in the forest while being pursued by circus monkeys who escaped from a traveling circus. Meanwhile, Angelica Pickles sets out to find the babies after they accidentally take her Cynthia doll with them. This film guest stars David Spade as Ranger Frank, Whoopi Goldberg as Ranger Margret, and Tim Curry as Rex Pester.

==== Rugrats in Paris: The Movie (2000) ====
The film focuses on Chuckie Finster as he is on a search for a new mother. In this movie, Tommy's father, Stu, is invited to stay in Paris, France to rebuild a robotic Reptar used in a stage musical. After convincing from Angelica, Stu's child-hating boss, Coco LaBouche, attempts to marry Chuckie's father, Chas, just to become the head of her company. Chuckie and the other Rugrats must stop her from becoming his mother. This film guest stars Susan Sarandon as Coco LaBouche, John Lithgow as Jean-Claude, and Mako Iwamatsu as Mr. Yamaguchi. This is Christine Cavanaugh's final theatrical film role before her retirement in 2003 and death in 2014. The film features a classical version of the Rugrats theme song at the start of the film.

==== Rugrats Go Wild (2003) ====
This film is a crossover between the Rugrats and The Wild Thornberrys. In this film, Stu and Didi Pickles decide to take a vacation with their children, Tommy and Dil, with their friends coming along. However, the ship Stu has chartered is not especially seaworthy, and their party ends up stranded on an uncharted island in the Pacific. The kids decide to search for television personality Sir Nigel Thornberry, who is also on the island with his family. Meanwhile, Nigel's daughter, Eliza, who can talk to animals, meets Spike, the Pickles' dog. In addition to The Wild Thornberrys cast members reprising their roles, this film guest stars Bruce Willis as the voice of Spike, Chrissie Hynde as Siri the clouded leopard, and Ethan Phillips as Toa. This is also the first and only time Nancy Cartwright voiced Chuckie Finster in a film since his original voice actress retired in 2001. During its theatrical release, the film was presented with scratch-and-sniff cards (which were handed out at the box-office) to enhance the film experience. The scratch-and-sniff cards were also included on the home video version of the film.

=== Live-action ===
==== Untitled Rugrats live-action film ====
In October 2024, Deadline and Variety reported that a live-action/CGI Rugrats movie was in development at Paramount. Jason Moore was reported to be directing, with a script by Mikey Day and Streeter Seidell. Karen Rosenfelt was reported to be producing along with Rugrats creators Arlene Klasky and Gábor Csupó.

== Video games ==
Titles in the series of Rugrats video games
Year	Title	Platform(s)			Acquired label(s)
Year	Title	Console	Computer	Handheld	Acquired label(s)
1998	Rugrats Adventure Game	—N/a	Windows; Mac OS X	—N/a	—N/a
1998	Rugrats: Search for Reptar	PlayStation	—N/a	—N/a	PlayStation Greatest Hits
1998	The Rugrats Movie	—N/a	—N/a	Game Boy; Game Boy Color	—N/a
1998	Rugrats Activity Challenge	—N/a	Windows	—N/a	—N/a
1999	Rugrats: Studio Tour	PlayStation	—N/a	—N/a	—N/a
1999	Rugrats: Scavenger Hunt	Nintendo 64	—N/a	—N/a	—N/a
1999	Rugrats: Time Travelers	—N/a	—N/a	Game Boy Color	—N/a
1999	Rugrats Mystery Adventures	—N/a	Windows	—N/a	—N/a
2000	Rugrats: Totally Angelica	PlayStation	—N/a	Game Boy Color	—N/a
2000	Rugrats in Paris: The Movie	PlayStation; Nintendo 64	Windows	Game Boy Color	—N/a
2001	All Growed Up	—N/a	Windows	—N/a	—N/a
2001	Rugrats: Castle Capers	—N/a	—N/a	Game Boy Advance	—N/a
2002	Rugrats: Royal Ransom	PlayStation 2; GameCube	—N/a	—N/a	—N/a
2002	Rugrats Munchin Land	—N/a	Windows	—N/a	—N/a
2002	Rugrats: I Gotta Go Party	—N/a	—N/a	Game Boy Advance	—N/a
2003	Rugrats Go Wild	—N/a	Windows	Game Boy Advance	—N/a
2004	All Grown Up: Express Yourself	—N/a	—N/a	Game Boy Advance	—N/a
2005	Rugrats: Totally Angelica-Boredom Busters	—N/a	Windows	—N/a	—N/a
2005	Rugrats Food Fight	—N/a	—N/a	Mobile	—N/a
2024	Rugrats: Adventures in Gameland	PlayStation 4; PlayStation 5; Nintendo Switch; Nintendo Entertainment System; Xbox One; Xbox Series X/S	Windows	—N/a	—N/a
2026	Rugrats: Retro Rewind Collection	PlayStation 5; Nintendo Switch	—N/a	—N/a	—N/a
2027	Rugrats Portable Collection	—N/a	—N/a	Game Boy Color	—N/a

== Live performances ==
=== Rugrats: A Live Adventure ===
Rugrats: A Live Adventure was a show about Angelica's constant attempts to scare Chuckie.

== Books ==
=== The Rugrats Files (2000–02) ===
- The Quest for the Holey Pail by Sarah Willson (2000)
- The Case of the Missing Gold by David Lewman (2000)
- Yo-Ho-Ho and a Bottle of Milk by Kitty Richards (2000)
- Tale of an Unfinished Masterpiece by Maria Rosado (2001)
- In Search of Reptar by Steven Banks (2002)

== Comic strip ==
=== Rugrats (1998–2003) ===
From 1998 to 2003, Nick produced a Rugrats comic strip, which was distributed through Creators Syndicate.

== Characters ==
- Tommy Pickles
- Angelica Pickles
- Reptar
