= Rugrats (film series) =

Film series starting in 1998 and concluding in 2003

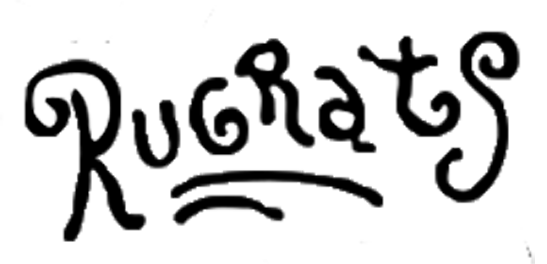
- Film series logo
- Directed by: Igor Kovalyov (1); Norton Virgien (1 & 3); Stig Bergqvist (2); Paul Demeyer (2); John Eng (3)
- Screenplay by: David N. Weiss (1 & 2); J. David Stem (1 & 2); Jill Gorey (2); Barbara Herndon (2); Kate Boutilier (2 & 3)
- Based on: Rugrats by Arlene Klasky; Gábor Csupó; Paul Germain Rugrats characters created by: Arlene Klasky; Gábor Csupó; Paul Germain
- Produced by: Arlene Klasky (1-3); Gábor Csupó (1-3)
- Starring: E.G. Daily; Christine Cavanaugh; Nancy Cartwright; Kath Soucie; Cheryl Chase; Tara Strong; Cree Summer; Dionne Quan; (Complete list)
- Edited by: John Bryant (1-3); Kimberly Rettberg (1 & 3)
- Music by: Mark Mothersbaugh
- Production companies: Nickelodeon Movies; Klasky Csupo
- Distributed by: Paramount Pictures
- Release dates: November 20, 1998 (1); November 17, 2000 (2); June 13, 2003 (3); 1998-present
- Running time: 238 minutes
- Country: United States
- Language: English
- Budget: $79 million
- Box office: $299,590,872

The Rugrats film series is an American animated comedy-adventure film series from the Nickelodeon media franchise of the same name, created by Arlene Klasky, Gábor Csupó, and Paul Germain. The three films were released in 1998, 2000, and 2003. The first and second films were a commercial success and received generally positive reviews, while the third film was a commercial failure and received unfavorable reviews.

== Films ==
=== The Rugrats Movie (1998) ===
The story escalates when Tommy Pickles, is put into difficult situation with the birth of his new brother, Dil, who will not stop crying and is taking all of their parents' attention. Lil and Phil, suggest that Dil should be returned to the hospital, though Tommy and Chuckie object. They eventually get into the Reptar Wagon take a high-speed ride straight into the deep woods where they get lost. The babies must find their way home in the forest while being pursued by circus monkeys who escaped from a traveling circus. Meanwhile, Angelica Pickles sets out to find the babies after they accidentally take her Cynthia doll with them. This film guest stars David Spade as Ranger Frank, Whoopi Goldberg as Ranger Margret, and Tim Curry as Rex Pester.

=== Rugrats in Paris: The Movie (2000) ===
The film focuses on Chuckie Finster as he is on a search for a new mother. In this movie, Tommy's father, Stu, is invited to stay in Paris, France to rebuild a robotic Reptar used in a stage musical. After convincing from Angelica, Stu's child-hating boss, Coco LaBouche, attempts to marry Chuckie's father, Chas, just to become the head of her company, Chuckie and the other Rugrats must stop her from becoming his mother. This film guest stars Susan Sarandon as Coco LaBouche, John Lithgow as Jean-Claude, and Mako Iwamatsu as Mr. Yamaguchi. This is Christine Cavanaugh's final theatrical film role before her retirement in 2003 and death in 2014. The film features a classical version of the Rugrats theme song at the start of the film.

=== Rugrats Go Wild (2003) ===
This film is a crossover between the Rugrats and The Wild Thornberrys. In this film, Stu and Didi Pickles decide to take a vacation with their children, Tommy and Dil, with their friends coming along. However, the ship Stu has chartered is not especially seaworthy, and their party ends up stranded on an uncharted island in the Pacific. The kids decide to search for television personality Sir Nigel Thornberry, who is also on the island with his family. Meanwhile, Nigel's daughter, Eliza, who can talk to animals, meets Spike, the Pickles' dog. In addition to The Wild Thornberrys cast members reprising their roles, this film guest stars Bruce Willis as the voice of Spike, Chrissie Hynde as Siri the clouded leopard, and Ethan Phillips as Toa. This is also the first and only time Nancy Cartwright voiced Chuckie Finster in a film since his original voice actress retired in 2001. During its theatrical release, the film was presented with scratch-and-sniff cards (which were handed out at the box-office) to enhance the film experience. The scratch-and-sniff cards were also included on the home video version of the film. The film was the least successful of the series both critically and commercially.

=== Untitled live-action/CGI film (TBA) ===
On July 16, 2018, it was announced that Paramount Players had greenlit a live-action/CGI hybrid feature film to be written by David A. Goodman. The film was last set for a January 29, 2021 release date, pushed back from a November 13, 2020 release, with Clifford the Big Red Dog taking its old slot. David Bowers was announced as director, but on November 12, 2019, the film was removed from Paramount's release schedule replacing it with Paramount Animation's Rumble (that was released in 2021). In October 2024 it was announced that the film had resumed production at Paramount with Jason Moore on board to direct with Mikey Day and Streeter Seidell setting to pen the script. The main characters are reported to be depicted using CGI while the other elements of the film will be live-action.

== Cast and crew ==
=== Voice cast ===
Characters	Films		
Characters	The Rugrats Movie	Rugrats in Paris: The Movie	Rugrats Go Wild
Characters	1998	2000	2003
Thomas "Tommy" Pickles	E. G. Daily	E. G. Daily	E. G. Daily
Charles "Chuckie" Finster Jr.	Christine Cavanaugh	Christine Cavanaugh	Nancy Cartwright
Phillip "Phil" DeVille	Kath Soucie	Kath Soucie	Kath Soucie
Lillian "Lil" DeVille	Kath Soucie	Kath Soucie	Kath Soucie
Angelica Pickles	Cheryl Chase	Cheryl Chase	Cheryl Chase
Dylan "Dil" Pickles	Tara Strong	Tara Strong	Tara Strong
Susie Carmichael	Cree Summer	Cree Summer	Cree Summer
Spike	Frank Welker	Frank Welker	Bruce Willis
Kimi Finster		Dionne Quan	Dionne Quan
Stuart "Stu" Pickles	Jack Riley	Jack Riley	Jack Riley
Diane "Didi" Pickles	Melanie Chartoff	Melanie Chartoff	Melanie Chartoff
Grandpa Louis "Lou" Pickles	Joe Alaskey	Joe Alaskey	Joe Alaskey
Charlotte Pickles	Tress MacNeille	Tress MacNeille	Tress MacNeille
Andrew "Drew" Pickles	Michael Bell	Michael Bell	Michael Bell
Charles "Chas" Finster Sr.	Michael Bell	Michael Bell	Michael Bell
Kira Finster		Julia Kato	Julia Kato
Elizibeth "Betty" DeVille	Kath Soucie	Kath Soucie	Kath Soucie
Howard DeVille	Philip Proctor	Philip Proctor	Philip Proctor
Ranger Frank	David Spade		
Ranger Margret	Whoopi Goldberg		
Rex Pester	Tim Curry		
Dr. Lipschitz	Tony Jay		Tony Jay
Grandpa Boris Kropotkin	Michael Bell	Silent cameo	
Grandma Minka Kropotkin	Melanie Chartoff	Silent cameo	
Aunt Miriam Pickles	Andrea Martin	Silent cameo	
Dr. Lucille "Lucy" Carmichael	Hattie Winston	Silent cameo	
Lulu Pickles		Debbie Reynolds	
Coco LaBouche		Susan Sarandon	
Jean-Claude		John Lithgow	
Mr. Yamaguchi		Mako	
Eliza Thornberry			Lacey Chabert
Darwin Thornberry			Tom Kane
Nigel Thornberry			Tim Curry
Donnie Thornberry			Flea
Debbie Thornberry			Danielle Harris
Marianne Thornberry			Jodi Carlisle
Siri			Chrissie Hynde
Toa			Ethan Phillips

=== Crew ===
Film	Director(s)	Producer(s)	Executive producer(s)	Writer(s)	Composer	Editor(s)
The Rugrats Movie	Igor Kovalyov; Norton Virgien	Arlene Klasky; Gábor Csupó	Albie Hecht; Debby Beece	David N. Weiss; J. David Stem	Mark Mothersbaugh	John Bryant; Kimberly Rettberg
Rugrats in Paris	Stig Bergqvist; Paul Demeyer	Arlene Klasky; Gábor Csupó	Albie Hecht; Julia Pistor; Eryk Casemiro; Hal Waite	David N. Weiss; J. David Stem; Jill Gorey; Barbara Herndon; Kate Boutilier	Mark Mothersbaugh	John Bryant
Rugrats Go Wild	Norton Virgien; John Eng	Arlene Klasky; Gábor Csupó	Albie Hecht; Julia Pistor; Eryk Casemiro; Hal Waite	Kate Boutilier	Mark Mothersbaugh	John Bryant; Kimberly Rettberg
Untitled Rugrats live-action film	Jason Moore	TBA	TBA	Mikey Day; Streeter Seidell	TBA	TBA

== Reception ==
=== Box office performance ===
Film	Release date	Box office gross				Box office ranking		Budget	Ref(s)
Film	Release date	North America Opening weekend	North America	Other territories	Worldwide	All time North America	All time Worldwide	Budget	Ref(s)
The Rugrats Movie	November 20, 1998	$27,321,470	$100,494,675	$40,400,000	$140,894,675	848	1,430	$24,000,000	
Rugrats in Paris: The Movie	November 17, 2000	$22,718,184	$76,507,756	$26,783,375	$103,291,131	1,178	1,860	$30,000,000	
Rugrats Go Wild	June 13, 2003	$11,556,869	$39,402,572	$16,002,494	$55,405,066	2,419	3,022	$25,000,000	
Total		$61,596,523	$216,405,003	$46,825,869	$299,590,872			$79,000,000	
List indicator: A dark grey cell indicates the information is not available for the film.

=== Critical and public response ===
Film	Critical		Public
Film	Rotten Tomatoes	Metacritic	CinemaScore
The Rugrats Movie	59% (51 reviews)	62 (20 reviews)	A-
Rugrats in Paris: The Movie	76% (74 reviews)	62 (25 reviews)	A-
Rugrats Go Wild	39% (89 reviews)	38 (27 reviews)	A-

== See also ==
- Rugrats
  - Rugrats revival
- Nickelodeon Movies
