= Rugrats: A Live Adventure =

Rugrats: A Live Adventure was a live musical show that toured across the United States and United Kingdom. It was based on the animated television series Rugrats, which aired on Nickelodeon. The live show was conceived in 1994, and debuted in the U.S. on February 6, 1998, with a two-year, 50-city tour. The U.K. tour debuted on October 28, 1999. The show was produced by Nickelodeon and Pace Variety Entertainment. The main cast from the television series reprised their roles through audio recordings, and members of the creative team were also involved, including series creators Arlene Klasky and Gábor Csupó, and composer Mark Mothersbaugh.

== Overview ==
The musical was based on the animated television series Rugrats. The main cast reprised their roles through audio recordings, while their characters were portrayed by costumed performers. The show featured 10 major dance numbers. Aside from live performers and set pieces, the show also incorporated a wall of video screens, which provided moving background images and helped progress the storyline. The show had a running time of approximately 100 minutes, and was divided into two acts. An intermission period provided audience members with the chance to buy merchandise based on the live show.

Rugrats: A Live Adventure focused on Chuckie Finster (voiced by Christine Cavanaugh) and his wide range of fears. Because Chuckie feels safest when adults are around, Tommy Pickles (E. G. Daily) uses a ball and cardboard tube to invent the People-ator, a wand-like device that can bring inanimate household objects to life, including a singing flashlight. Angelica Pickles (Cheryl Chase) steals the People-ator and declares herself to be Princess of the World. Tommy and Chuckie set out to retrieve the People-ator, with help from Susie Carmichael (Cree Summer) and Phil and Lil DeVille (Kath Soucie). Chuckie eventually overcomes his fears by riding a 28-foot smoke-breathing Reptar, and the babies succeed in taking back the People-ator.

== Production ==
Rugrats began airing on Nickelodeon in 1991, and the idea for a stage show originated in 1994, when Nick met with Pace Variety Entertainment. The two would go on to produce Rugrats: A Live Adventure. Production began in mid-1997. It was inspired by the success of the television series and the upcoming premiere of The Rugrats Movie (1998).

Arlene Klasky and Gábor Csupó, creators of the television series, also served as creative consultants for the live show. It was written by Jon Cooksey and his wife Ali Marie Matheson, both writers for the television series. They got input from their four-year-old daughter. Matheson said, "If she squirmed during any sequence, we knew we had to change it". The stage show was aimed at children ages 6 to 11. Cooksey and Matheson had never written a musical, which would have physical limitations compared to the television series. The live show went through a dozen drafts, and the musical portion took four months to put together. The show's start-up budget was $3.5 million, and it cost $300,000 per week to produce in each city where it toured.

It was directed and choreographed by Danny Herman. Mark Mothersbaugh had previously composed the music for the television series, and served as the musical director for the live show. Going off of a rough script, Mothersbaugh wrote the songs for the live show over a three-month period, incorporating a variety of musical genres such as gospel, opera, rap, and reggae. Compared to the television series, Mothersbaugh said the live show was a more-collaborative process: "There was a choreographer and lighting people and set people involved. So if I wrote a song and the lyrics had something about a boat in it, they had to put a boat in the show. The lyrics were changing the direction of the performance".

Performers wore latex foam heads made to resemble the Rugrats characters. The actors had to coordinate their movements with audio samples recorded by the television cast. Pace's Jonathan Hochwald, who served as executive producer, said "We had to deal with the fact that this was a live show that was based on an animated TV program. We had to create costumes of the toddlers that were, in reality, 6 feet tall. So in order to make them look like kids, we had to design sets, like rocking chairs, that were 18 feet tall or so". Because the costumes were heavy and difficult to control, a second set of performers was hired, allowing the cast to swap out with each other in between the dance numbers.

Rugrats: A Live Adventure launched a two-year, 50-city U.S. tour on February 6, 1998, starting at the Oakdale Theatre in Wallingford, Connecticut. The show was successful, prompting a second tour for the East Coast. A United Kingdom tour began on October 28, 1999, and included stops in Wembley, Cardiff, and Manchester.

== Reception ==
Ron MacFarlane, writing for Animation World Network, praised the costume design and the dancers, but found the music "loud and disconcertingly unremarkable". Deseret News praised the show but wrote, "If 'A Live Adventure' was missing something, it was the cross-generational appeal of the TV show, which can amuse both the kids and their parents". Chris Jones of the Chicago Tribune wrote, "The considerable cleverness of the original cartoon is lost here in an overamplified and mindless live affair that treats kids as passive consumers, not thinking individuals".

As of July 1998, more than 750,000 people had attended the show. By January 1999, the show had grossed $25.2 million.
