= Rugrats (disambiguation) =

Rugrats is a 1991 animated television series.

Rugrat(s) may also refer to:

== Nickelodeon franchise ==
- Rugrats (2021 TV series), a reboot of the original 1991 series
- Rugrats (film series).
  - The Rugrats Movie a 1998 film.
  - Rugrats in Paris: The Movie the sequel to the 1998 film.
  - Rugrats Go Wild the sequel to Rugrats in Paris: The Movie. This was also the sequel to The Wild Thornberrys Movie.
- Rugrats (comic strip)
- Rugrats (franchise)

== Music ==
- The Rugrats (band), a rock band
- "Rugrats", a 2017 song by Kodak Black off the album Project Baby 2
- "Rug Rat", a song by Pavement found on the album Crooked Rain, Crooked Rain: LA's Desert Origins
- "Rugrat", a 2020 non-album single by ppcocaine

== Other uses ==
- Rugrats Park, Banbury, Osfordshire, England, UK
- Rugrat, a slang term for toddler
- Rug rat amp, or Class-T amplifier
- Rug-Ratz, a prison gang founded by Tay-K
- Rugrat, a character from The Wolf of Wall Street (2013 film)
