= Rugrats Adventure Game =

1998 educational adventure video game

- Developer: Broderbund
- Publisher: Broderbund
- Director: Bridget Erdmann
- Producer: Elizabeth Stuart
- Designer: Jim Everson
- Writers: Jon Cooksey; Ali Matheson
- Composer: Earwax Productions
- Series: Rugrats
- Platforms: Windows, Macintosh
- Release: US: September 30, 1998
- Genres: Adventure, educational
- Mode: Single-player

Rugrats Adventure Game is an educational adventure point and click video game based on the Rugrats television series released for Microsoft Windows and Macintosh on September 30, 1998. It was developed and published by Broderbund (then a subsidiary of The Learning Company). The game follows Tommy Pickles and friends Chuckie Finster, Phil DeVille, and Lil DeVille as they try to rescue Tommy's beloved toy Reptar from being thrown out as garbage. The game incorporates point and click gameplay, with characters and objects appearing in different locations even after the player has visited them once. Angelica Pickles, the series' main antagonist, appears in the game to help further the story and ultimately become the game's main villain.

Rugrats Adventure Game is the first in a series of video games based on the Rugrats series, preceding Rugrats Activity Challenge and Rugrats Mystery Adventures on PC.

== Plot ==
After being forbidden from watching a Reptar movie by Didi, Tommy and his friends decide to act it out, but they are stopped by Angelica, who throws Reptar into a trash can out of spite. Using Tommy's screwdriver to escape the playpen, the Rugrats attempt to save Reptar by stowing away inside another trash can to be taken outside, but they are spooked by a garbage truck (called "Hubert" by the babies) and sent back to their playpen by Didi.

Refusing to give up, the Rugrats unlock the playpen again, when Angelica comes to "warn" them about aliens that are coming to kidnap them. With the help of Stu's G.R.O.S. (Garbage Relocating Outside System) invention, the babies manage to sneak outside and retrieve Reptar, only for Angelica to steal it again. The Rugrats fight with Angelica over the doll and successfully take it back. Afterwards, Angelica "transforms" into an alien named "Angeleeka", who plans to destroy Earth. The babies battle Angeleeka in an outer space fantasy and defeat her by splatting her with a coconut pie. The Rugrats then break the fourth wall, thanking the player for their help as the game ends.

== Gameplay ==
The game follows Tommy, Chuckie, Phil, and Lil working to complete the tasks they need in order to get outside and rescue Reptar. The entirety of the game is set in Tommy Pickles' house and each location is split into several screens where Tommy can walk to. At least one of his friends is on each screen, and can help in collecting items or completing certain tasks. Items are stored in Tommy's diaper, and they can be accessed by clicking on the diaper. Different minigames can be played at certain points in the game, which help the player progress further. By hovering the cursor over the bottom of the screen, several buttons will show up, revealing how many of the tasks the player has completed in the main goal, and giving options on whether to reset the game or quit. A "cry" button is also shown, which will cause the Rugrats to cry when clicked on, prompting Didi to take them back to their playpen, the first area in the game.

== Production ==
Rugrats Adventure Game was released alongside Rugrats Movie Activity Challenge and Rugrats Print Shop on September 30, 1998, in anticipation of The Rugrats Movie. The Learning Company president stated that "The unprecedented strength and breadth of the Rugrats franchise offers us the opportunity to promote the Rugrats CD-Roms on a broader scale and with much greater impact than our competition." Broderbund held a promotion where the purchase of any Rugrats title from November 1998 to June 1, 1999, would give consumers 20% off a second Broderbund kid's product. As part of a cross-promotion, 200 copies of the game were available as second prize in a scratch-n-win sweepstakes by Simon and Schuster Children's Division, which sold Rugrats books.

== Critical reception ==
AllGame recommended that players sit with their kids to help them if they get stuck. MacHome described it as being "extensive and richly animated", and a mix between Myst and a Huggies commercial. Just Adventure felt it was a fantastic title to develop computer skills and a love of adventure games within youth. Hartford Courant liked the game's "playful" graphics and music. CBS News conducted a children playtest of the three Rugrats CD-ROMs and found them all to be "winners". The Boston Globe praised the variety of the three CD-ROMs. Boston Herald called Rugrats Adventure Game a "waste of money and time". The Baltimore Sun said the game's requirement to get items in a certain order is frustrating and that it slows down the pace. The Washington Post deemed it "silly" and "fun". Los Angeles Daily News praised the title's educational skill-building. The Los Angeles Times found the main characters' "mangling of the English language" to be grating. Kiplinger's Finance felt it was "convenient" that the title was tied to the theatrical film. PC Direct liked the game's mix of comedy, madcap antics, and puzzles.

The game was nominated for "PC Children's Entertainment Title of the Year" at the 2nd Annual Interactive Achievement Awards, ultimately losing to Disney/Pixar's A Bug's Life.

Rugrats Adventure Game was among the best-selling PC games of October 1998, and was 9th-best-selling home education software for 1999.
