= Rugrats: I Gotta Go Party =

2002 video game

- North American box art
- Developer: Eurocom Entertainment Software
- Publisher: THQ
- Series: Rugrats
- Platform: Game Boy Advance
- Release: NA: November 18, 2002; EU: December 6, 2002
- Genres: Action-adventure, party
- Mode: Single-player

Rugrats: I Gotta Go Party is a 2002 Game Boy Advance game based on the Rugrats series, developed by Eurocom Entertainment Software and published by THQ. It was also released on a triple pack cartridge with Tak and the Power of Juju and SpongeBob SquarePants: SuperSponge in 2005.

== Gameplay ==
The game's storyline centers on Tommy Pickles playing a game of hide and seek with his brother, Dil, his cousin, Angelica Pickles, and his friends, Chuckie Finster, Phil and Lil DeVille, and Kimi Finster.

The player helps Tommy find the characters and unlock mini games for each Rugrat. The player receives a cookie after getting a satisfactory score. The game takes one cookie away if the player does not obtain a satisfactory score. The mini games range from bouncing bones and catching cookies to slide puzzles. Upon winning, the player gets a ranking. The better the player performs, the better the ranking is, with the ultimate title being "Top Toddler."

== Reception ==
Rugrats: I Gotta Go Party received generally positive feedback from critics upon release, with FamilyFriendlyGaming giving the game a 76% rating, GameZone awarding an 8.6 out of 10 score, and GameVortex stating that although it is skewed to a primarily young audience, it's "good enough to please older fans of party games as well."
