= Rugrats (comic strip) =

American comic strip (1998–2003)

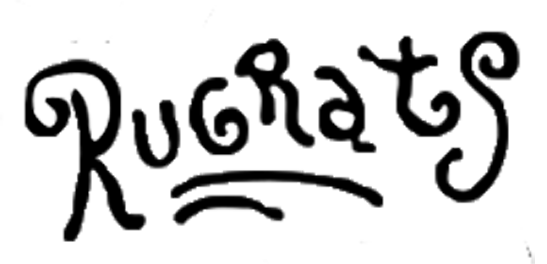
- Author(s): Scott Gray and Steve Crespo (Originators) Others later. (based on the television series created by Arlene Klasky, Gábor Csupó and Paul Germain)
- Website: Official site
- Current status/schedule: Concluded daily strips; reruns
- Launch date: April 5, 1998
- End date: May 3, 2003
- Syndicate(s): Creators Syndicate
- Genre: Humor ("Funny kid")

Rugrats was a daily comic strip based on the Nickelodeon animated television series Rugrats. Like the program, the comic strip was written to be humorous to both children and adults. The strip ran from April 5, 1998, to May 3, 2003.

Writers for the series were Scott Gray, Gordon Kent, Lee Nordling, Chuck Kim, Scott Roberts, J. Torres, Mark Bilgrey, John Zakour, and Rob Moran. The original artist was Steve Crespo, pencils and inks. Crespo left early on, and Will Blyberg took over inking, while other pencilers included: Gary Fields, Kyle Baker, (who did his own inking) a South American known only as "Rodrigues", Tim Harkins, Vince Giarrano, and Scott Roberts (the only contributor to both write and draw the strip.) By the end, Roberts was the sole penciler, and Blyberg inked till the final strip. Sundays were colored by Stu Chaifitz. Tim Harkins and Gary Fields lettered even after they stopped penciling.

Early strips had no continuity, but later years featured short storylines. Public reaction to the series was muted, compared to the television series. Washington Post readers of all age brackets, for example, voted Rugrats as its worst comic strip. Many newspapers quickly demoted the title to Sunday-only.

In all, 130 newspapers carried the comic strip at some point during its run, in the United States, Australia, Brazil, Mexico, and Canada. Newspapers in Orlando (home of Nickelodeon Studios) never picked up the title, while Rugrats was dropped early from New York City and Los Angeles papers, home of the Viacom and Klasky-Csupo headquarters, respectively.

Scott Gray and Tim Harkins created two special strips for Mott's Flavored Applesauce, single-serving.

== Relation to the animation ==
Occasional comic strips conflict with the continuity of the television series, reintroducing characters in different scenarios, but some take plotlines from episodes.

For the weeks of November 26 to December 9, 2000, the strips were themed to the feature film Rugrats in Paris: The Movie. The assumption is that the readers have seen the feature film, not fully dealing with the major plot points of the movie. In the November 30 strip, Kimi first appears in the comic strip, without any introduction to the character. The first week after the series is about Chuckie being excited that he has a new sister.
