= Rugrats: Totally Angelica =

2000 video game

- North American PlayStation version box art
- Developers: Tiertex Design Studios (GBC); Art Co., Ltd (PS1)
- Publisher: THQ
- Designer: Nickelodeon
- Platforms: Game Boy Color, PlayStation
- Release: Game Boy Color: NA: May 4, 2000; EU: September 8, 2000; PlayStation: NA: April 10, 2001; EU: June 29, 2001
- Genre: Action
- Modes: Single-player, multiplayer

Rugrats: Totally Angelica is an action video game based on the 1991 Nickelodeon animated children's television series Rugrats. It was developed by Art Co., Ltd and published by THQ for the Game Boy Color (GBC) and PlayStation. The GBC version was released in 2000, while the PlayStation version was published in 2001. It is also the last Rugrats game to be released for the PlayStation and Game Boy Color. A direct sequel for the PC was released in 2002, titled Totally Angelica: Boredom Busters!. It was a point and click adventure game, and was developed by KnowWonder and published by Mattel Interactive.

== Plot and gameplay ==
The game starts off with Angelica Pickles becoming the proud owner of a brand new "Cynthia Dream Mall Fashion Show Queen" set. She opens the box and finds that it is broken. However, after thinking about it, she ends up being the star.

Players play the role of Angelica, which she is exploring the shopping mall in search of stores and items to win, Starting on the first floor, she enters the shops to play games in order to win clothes and accessories for Angelica's fashion ensemble. Players can then enter a store to play a mini-game. By completing the mini-game, players can choose a prize. Players must collect as many clothes, wigs and accessories as they can, then enter the fashion show. In the fashion show, players play dress-up with Angelica which they create different outfits with the items they've won. The Rugrats babies, Fluffy the cat, Grandpa Lou and Reptar judge the player's outfits. Each fashion show score is worth points toward the other mall floors.

When the player wins enough points, players can use the lift to go to the next floor. Each floor features different games and new items to win. Players must stand in front of a shop and Tommy Pickles tells the players what game is inside. The items displayed in the store window show the types of prizes players can win in that game. Angelica can win shoes, clothing, hairstyles, hats, make-up, and jewelry in different stores. Angelica can go to the fashion show each time she wins an item. Every trip down the catwalk earns points toward the next floor of the mall, and players will have to visit the fashion show several times in order to earn enough points to visit the next floor. However, if the players finish the game, they have to send away "Totally Angelica" points, so they get Cynthia Dream Mall Fashion Show Queen dolls and playsets.

== Development ==
After THQ released two Rugrats games for the Game Boy Color, having signed an agreement with Nickelodeon to develop and publish video games using the Rugrats license until December 2002, they announced the game. It was to join Acclaim's Mary-Kate and Ashley as a Game Boy Color game targeted at girl gamers, and was to be launched in spring of 2000.

== Reception ==
Reception

Aggregate score
| Aggregator | Score |
|---|---|
| GameRankings | 48.33% (GBC) |

Review scores
| Publication | Score |
|---|---|
| AllGame | 3.5/5 (GBC); 3/5 (PS) |
| IGN | 2/10 (GBC) |
| Nintendo Power | 6.5/10 |
| PlayStation Official Magazine – UK | 2/10 (PS) |

Reviews were critically mixed to negative, receiving an aggregate score of 48.33% from GameRankings.

The Game Boy Color version reviewed somewhat better than the PlayStation version.
