= Rugrats: Scavenger Hunt =

1999 video game

- North American cover art
- Developer: Realtime Associates
- Publisher: THQ
- Producer: Elisabeth Walkley
- Programmers: Tom Powers; John Bryant; Fraser Thompson; Stephen C. Nguyen
- Composers: Mark Mothersbaugh; Mutato Muzika; Greg Turner
- Platform: Nintendo 64
- Release: NA: June 28, 1999; EU: August 10, 1999
- Genre: Board game
- Modes: Single-player, multiplayer

Rugrats: Scavenger Hunt (known as Rugrats: Treasure Hunt in PAL regions) is a 1999 party video game developed by Realtime Associates and published by THQ for the Nintendo 64. The game is based on the Nickelodeon animated television series Rugrats. It features the original voices from the Rugrats cast reprising their roles as Tommy Pickles, Chuckie Finster, and Phil and Lil DeVille as well as supporting characters Grandpa Lou, Didi and Stu Pickles, Susie Carmichael, Reptar, and series antagonist Angelica Pickles.

The game features three game boards: Angelica's Temple of Gloom, which has an Aztec setting; Pirate Treasure Hunt, where the babies scuba dive under water to find hidden treasure near a sunken ship; and Reptar Rally, which is the only stage that changes the babies into dinosaurs, resembling the form of Reptar. The game received mixed reviews from critics, who compared it unfavorably with Mario Party.

== Gameplay ==
The opening cutscene shows Didi Pickles, Grandpa Lou, Tommy Pickles, and Chuckie Finster in the Pickles home. Didi is setting up a board game while Grandpa reads the rules, leading to the setup screen. The game includes a multiplayer option for up to four players, and it has four playable characters, including Tommy, Chuckie, Phil, and Lil. Any characters not controlled by the players are instead controlled by the game through artificial intelligence.

The main goal is to collect the most of a specific item. Stages begin with a cutscene to explain what needs to be collected, then the game begins. A spinner is used to determine how many spaces each player can move. Items can be gathered after landing on the "Search" space, which can be recognized by the magnifying glass design. Searching may lead players to find only a dust bunny, a dud item with no function, but it is the only way to acquire certain items. If a player finds the "Double Search Power" tool when searching, he/she may search twice every turn. Dil Pickles, Tommy's brother, appears when a player stops on a "Mystery" space, driving the Reptar Wagon and changing the identity of the spaces on the board. There is a hidden square option that can be turned on or off at the start screen.

Players can collect cookies, toy cards, and energy. Cookies are a form of currency that may provide opportunities for special bonuses. Non-playable characters, such as Grandpa and Tommy's dog Spike, serve as allies doing various tasks such as giving players extra cookies when they come in contact with them. Toy cards give players special abilities. One lets players turn into Reptar and travel up to five squares and stop anywhere they like, which can only be achieved normally when a "Set Spin" is selected randomly from the spinner. Toy cards can be purchased if one lands on a toy card space; which if used wisely, can stretch the limits of game play for a single turn. Energy is needed to move from one space to another in all boards excluding Reptar Rally. If one runs out of energy, they will warp to a "Bedroom" where the player can then warp to any of the main rooms instantly. There are also spaces for recovering different sleep amounts.

=== Game boards ===
Gameplay during the Angelica's Temple of Gloom board.

There are three different game boards, set in environments imagined by the babies.

Angelica's Temple of Gloom has an Aztec setting, and is the only board to be played cooperatively. The story of this game board begins when Stu Pickles comes home with a set of expensive replica Aztec statue pieces before being called away by Didi. Grandpa begins to tell the babies a story about exploring ancient Aztec ruins and coming to the Temple of Cokabowla before falling asleep. Angelica tells the babies the replicas are cursed and they would be sorry if they were to break, before accidentally breaking all of the statues onto the board. To win, the babies must recover all of the missing statue pieces (four times the number of active players) before Angelica finds hers. Angelica serves as the main antagonist, trying to snatch items in question before the others. She also may take away items from other players if they come in contact with her. If Angelica finds all her pieces first, then she successfully pins blame on the babies, telling Stu that they are responsible. The Rugrats are sent to their cribs, while Angelica laughs and says that adults will believe anything. If the babies find all their pieces first, then Angelica denies responsibility and leaves the room, while the babies celebrate their win.

Pirate Treasure Hunt takes place at a sunken ship. Stu buys a small pirate ship for an aquarium, and it reminds Grandpa of when he went scuba diving for a shipwreck containing treasure. After he falls asleep again, Angelica shows the babies foreign objects and passes them off as treasure, while telling them that there is more to be found all over the house. She says that whoever finds the most treasure will be her first mate and split the findings. Players compete against each other, each one exploring the shipwreck and trying to collect four kinds of pirate treasure. Susie Carmichael, a non-playable character, offers to help the babies find the treasure, providing them with a new piece whenever they encounter her on the board. After someone completes this task, the ending cutscene shows the babies back inside the house with Angelica. She congratulates them on finding her "treasure" until she realizes that the objects she showed them earlier are just useless junk. Tommy believes the real treasure is inside the aquarium's pirate ship, and Angelica tries to take it out and prove him wrong. However, she is caught by Didi and is upset that the babies ruined her plan.

Reptar Rally changes the babies into dinosaurs resembling Reptar as they each travel around mountains of candy. The story begins with Phil and Lil fighting over a Reptar doll, which goes flying out of their hands, knocking over a glass of chocolate milk. Angelica then tells the babies that Reptar comes from a place that is always messy with candy, serving as the setting for this board. Each player must collect a certain amount of specified sweets in order to win. Players move one way through several zones, each home to different sweets. Each zone is accessed by collecting keys, which are found by landing on certain spaces. The closing cutscene shows Angelica in the Pickles house trying to take the sweets from the babies, before tripping on the Reptar doll.

== Development and release ==
In 1997, THQ signed an agreement with Nickelodeon to develop and publish video games using the Rugrats license through December 2002. The deal gave THQ exclusive rights to Rugrats for all current and future game systems from Nintendo, Sony and Sega. Among the first projects announced as resulting from this deal was an as-yet untitled Nintendo 64 game scheduled for release in 1999. Rugrats: Scavenger Hunt was originally shown at THQ's booth at the 1999 Electronic Entertainment Expo. Mark Mothersbaugh composed the game's music. The game was released in France in December 1999.

== Reception ==
Reception

Aggregate score
Aggregator	Score
GameRankings	52.67%

Review scores
Publication	Score
AllGame	2/5
EP Daily	4/10
IGN	3.7/10
Mega Fun	64%
N64 Magazine	48%
Nintendo Power	5.3/10
Video Games (DE)	27% (EU); 0/4 (NA)
N64 Pro	80%
X64	48%

Rugrats: Scavenger Hunt received generally mixed reviews. Review aggregator GameRankings gave it a score of 52.67%. NPD Group noted that the game was the 19th best-selling video game in America during August 1999.

Turhan Herder of IGN called Rugrats: Scavenger Hunt "a dull, sloppy mess which not only embarrasses everyone involved but manages to tarnish the very license it meant to exploit". Herder described Scavenger Hunt as a basic gameplay style marred by "design decisions ranging from the incomprehensible to the downright bizarre". Some critics wrote Rugrats: Scavenger Hunt's use of license, such as the incorporation of the original voice actors, and simple gameplay would appeal to very young players but detract older gamers. AllGame journalist Anthony Baize and N64 Pro reviewer Paul felt only Rugrats fanatics would enjoy it. Other critics, such as Herder and N64 Magazine's Mark Green, wrote even young children would get tired of it quickly.

The main criticism was the boring gameplay, specifically its primitiveness and slow pace. Critics panned Rugrats: Scavenger Hunt as a monotonous experience consisting only of a limited number of game modes with little variety and the same goal between them: to roll dice and wait turns until a player has collected a certain number of items. Green found the Pirate Treasure Hunt the most thrilling of all the boards for its treasure-hunting theme and rock-paper-scissors mini-game; however, he found it mostly unexciting, as most of the gameplay still involved tedious collecting and even when a player lands on a hunt-for-treasure tile, "you simply get to jiggle the camera around a bit and await the random result of your search". Shaun wrote success was based on the randomness of tiles, making the challenge more based on luck than strategy.

Critics were annoyed by the length of time computer opponents took at their turns. Shaun of The Electric Playground was one of them, and lamented even playing with human friends was a stall as cutscenes still had to play in each turn. Baize also attributed the issue to unreachable goals, especially with Reptar's Rally; he reported that, in a mission to get 30 candy pieces, one player could obtain only two-to-three per turn, made more tedious by other players stealing them. He did, however, find the cutscenes the game's best aspect.

Comparisons to Mario Party were frequent and usually unfavorable.

Praises included the colorful graphics, particularly its closeness to their 2D incarnations, the inclusion of voice acting from the series, and the spot-on lip synchronization. Mega Fun found the characters well-animated and designed. Green had criticism towards the presentation, however, such as the "muffled" quality of the voice clips and the animation of the Rugrats being equivalent to the movement of "robots from a cheap 1960's sci-fi movie".
