= Nickelodeon Cultural Resort =

Theme park in Foshan, China

- Location: Foshan, Guangdong, China
- Opened: 2020 (planned)
- Area: 250 acres (1,000,000 m^{2})

Nickelodeon Cultural Resort is a Chinese resort hotel and theme park that is likely no longer under construction in Foshan, Guangdong. It was planned to have an area of 250 acres. Groundbreaking took place on January 4, 2017 and was originally planned to open in 2020. The park was part of a CN¥11.9 billion (US$1.71 billion) development, the Foshan Cultural and Ecological Coastal Project. With no updates on the project since 2020, it is assumed to be cancelled.

Concept artwork for the theme park showcased the themings for its seven areas: SpongeBob SquarePants, Teenage Mutant Ninja Turtles, Avatar: The Last Airbender, Paw Patrol, Dora the Explorer, a slime-themed entrance area, and an area that combines Danny Phantom, Invader Zim, The Fairly OddParents, Rugrats, and Jimmy Neutron.

A similarly ill-fated project, Nickelodeon Universe's Mall of China (Chongqing, China) location, was announced in 2018 and its Nickelodeon-related theming was cancelled in 2025.
