= Rugrats Go Wild =

2003 American animated film

- Theatrical release poster
- Directed by: Norton Virgien; John Eng
- Written by: Kate Boutilier
- Based on: Rugrats by: Arlene Klasky; Gábor Csupó; Paul Germain; The Wild Thornberrys by: Arlene Klasky; Gábor Csupó; Steve Pepoon; David Silverman; Stephen Sustarsic
- Produced by: Arlene Klasky; Gábor Csupó
- Starring: E. G. Daily; Nancy Cartwright; Kath Soucie; Dionne Quan; Cheryl Chase; Tim Curry; Lacey Chabert; Bruce Willis
- Edited by: John Bryant; Kimberly Rettberg
- Music by: Mark Mothersbaugh
- Production companies: Nickelodeon Movies; Klasky Csupo
- Distributed by: Paramount Pictures
- Release date: June 13, 2003
- Running time: 81 minutes
- Country: United States
- Language: English
- Budget: $25 million
- Box office: $55.4 million

Rugrats Go Wild is a 2003 American animated comedy crossover adventure film based on the Nickelodeon animated television series Rugrats and The Wild Thornberrys. It is the final installment of both the Rugrats and The Wild Thornberrys film series and serves as the sequel to both Rugrats in Paris: The Movie (2000) and The Wild Thornberrys Movie (2002). The film is also the only one to feature Nancy Cartwright as the voice of Chuckie Finster following original voice actress Christine Cavanaugh's retirement in 2001. The film follows the Rugrats and their families as they prepare for their planned vacation, but eventually get stranded on an uncharted island in the Pacific, where they meet the Thornberry family.

The film was produced by Nickelodeon Movies and Klasky Csupo and released in theaters on June 13, 2003. Rugrats Go Wild grossed $55.4 million worldwide and unlike its predecessors, it received negative reviews from critics. The film used "Odorama", which allowed the audience to smell aromas from the film using scratch and sniff cards.

== Plot ==
Following the Rugrats' joint family vacation in Paris (Note: As depicted in Rugrats in Paris: The Movie (2000)) and the Blackburns' apprehension, (Note: As depicted in The Wild Thornberrys Movie (2002)) they go on an imaginary safari, with Tommy impersonating Nigel Thornberry, whom he idolizes, and spoofing his nature show. The babies and their families are about to go on vacation on a tropical cruise ship, courtesy of Tommy's father, Stu. Upon arriving at the pier to depart, they discover that he has instead rented a ramshackle boat as their real vacation. The families are angered that Stu did not consult them on his plans, and during their journey, the boat is flipped over by a rogue wave during a tropical storm. Everyone is forced to abandon the ship and board a life raft as the ship sinks, and the group blames Stu.

The next morning, they arrive on a small, seemingly uninhabited island in the South China Sea. The grown-ups nominate Betty as leader after Didi forbids Stu from volunteering. On the opposite side of the island is the famous globe-trotting family, the Thornberrys, out to film a clouded leopard. The kids, except for Angelica, set off to find Nigel to get his help to get them home, as they suspect he is somewhere on the island. Along the way, Chuckie gets lost and runs into Donnie Thornberry, who steals his clothes, forcing Chuckie to wear Donnie's shorts.

Meanwhile, Eliza Thornberry is exploring the jungle with Darwin, her pet chimpanzee, and runs into Spike, the Pickles' dog. Since Eliza can talk to animals, Spike is heard speaking; he informs her that his babies are lost somewhere on the island. Under the impression that Spike means he is looking for puppies, Eliza and a reluctant Darwin agree to help him find them. Following a close encounter with Siri, an angry clouded leopard, they learn that he meant human babies.

Simultaneously, Nigel finds the lost babies. He heads in their direction but ends up tumbling down a hill and suffers amnesia after a coconut falls on his head, which reverts him to his three-year-old self. They encounter Siri, but Donnie fends her off; Chuckie finds him and they swap back their clothes. After escaping from Siri on a high-speed pram, the gang lands in a crater. Angelica runs into Debbie Thornberry, and takes off with Debbie in the Thornberry's all-purpose mobile communication vehicle (commvee). To get back more quickly, Angelica steals the Thornberry's bathysphere and accidentally sinks the commvee in her attempt to pilot it. She manages to find and retrieve the babies and Nigel.

Meanwhile, Stu has managed to create a working coconut radio. He and the other parents run into Donnie. After chasing him down the beach, they run into Marianne Thornberry. Stu's coconut radio picks up the babies, as Angelica accidentally turned on the bathysphere's radio. Angelica and Susie, while fighting for control, crash the bathysphere at the bottom of the ocean. Nigel hits his head in the crash and reverts to his normal self. Stu comes up with a plan to raise the commvee, and Marianne then uses the automatic-retrieval system to rescue Nigel and the babies just as the air runs out.

The babies and Nigel are reunited with their respective families, with Stu being thanked and forgiven, and everyone gets on board the cruise they had wanted originally. The Thornberrys join them, too, deciding that they should take a vacation, much to Debbie's delight, and Spike vows never to lose his babies again.

== Voice cast ==
=== Characters from Rugrats ===
- Tommy Pickles: E. G. Daily
- Chuckie Finster: Nancy Cartwright
- Betty DeVille, Phil DeVille and Lil DeVille: Kath Soucie
- Kimi Watanabe-Finster: Dionne Quan
- Angelica Pickles: Cheryl Chase
- Dil Pickles: Tara Strong
- Susie Carmichael: Cree Summer
- Spike: Bruce Willis
- Stu Pickles: Jack Riley
- Didi Pickles: Melanie Chartoff
- Chaz Finster and Drew Pickles: Michael Bell
- Charlotte Pickles: Tress MacNeille
- Kira Watanabe-Finster: Julia Kato
- Howard DeVille: Philip Proctor
- Grandpa Lou Pickles: Joe Alaskey
- Dr. Werner P. Lipschitz: Tony Jay (This was Jay's final film appearance before his death in August 2006.)

=== Characters from The Wild Thornberrys ===
- Eliza Thornberry: Lacey Chabert
- Darwin Thornberry: Tom Kane
- Debbie Thornberry: Danielle Harris
- Donnie Thornberry: Flea
- Nigel Thornberry: Tim Curry
- Marianne Thornberry: Jodi Carlisle

=== New characters ===
- Siri the Clouded Leopard: Chrissie Hynde
- Toa the Loris: Ethan Phillips

== Release ==
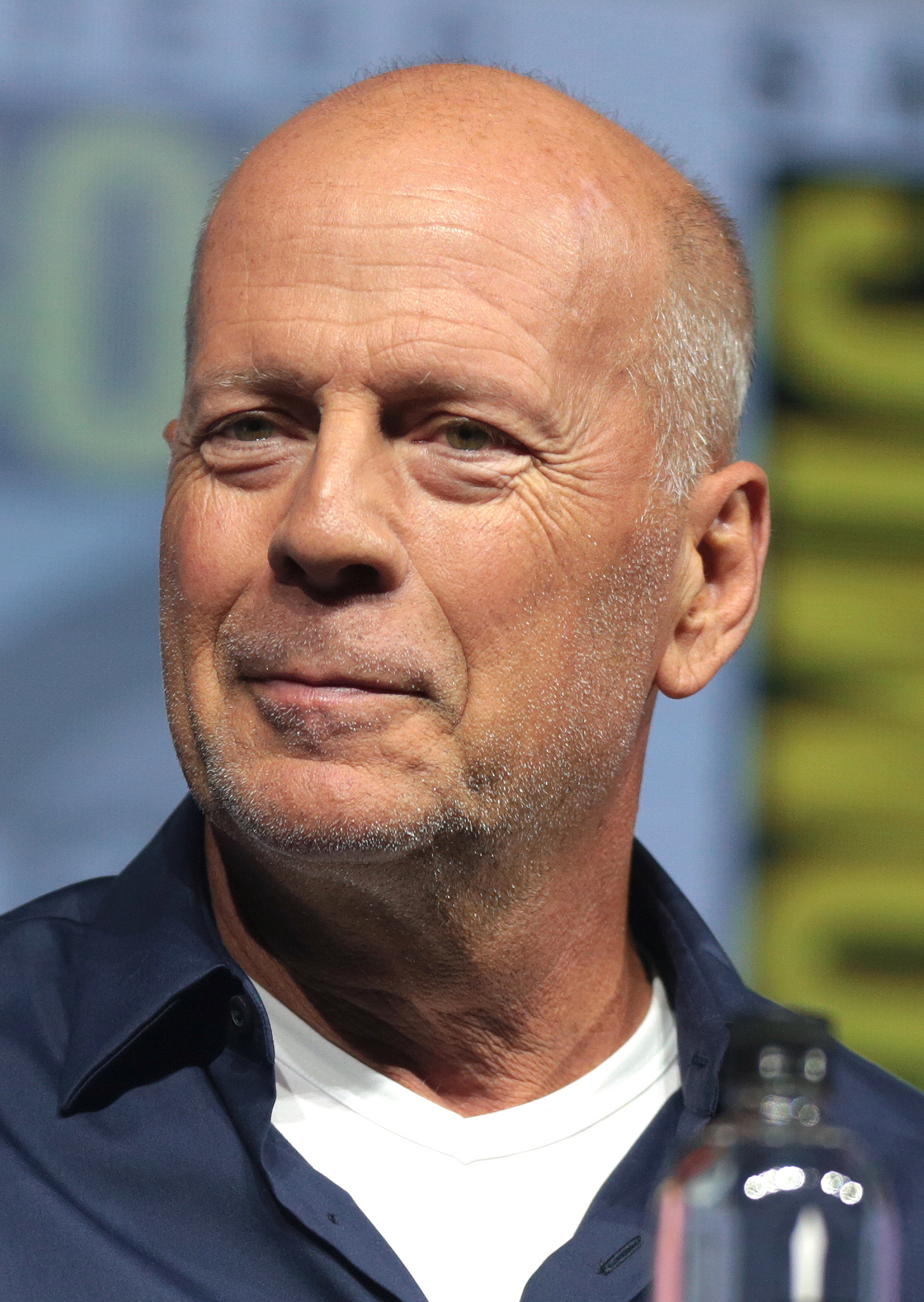
Bruce Willis (pictured in 2018) voices the Pickles family dog, Spike.

During its initial theatrical run, Rugrats Go Wild was presented in "Smell-O-Vision". During certain scenes in the movie, an icon would pop up on screen with an item inside of it (example: a smelly shoe). When this happened, audience members would smell a scratch-and-sniff card (which were handed out at the box office) with the corresponding image.

=== Marketing ===
Among the biggest promotion the film received was Bruce Willis voicing Spike, and the use of "Odorama" cards to enhance the viewing experience, Burger King and Blockbuster released a scratch and sniff piece of cardboard that was to be scratched and sniffed during the run of the movie.

=== Controversy ===
There were some complaints with the Odorama cards, including the claim that the cards only smelled like cardboard. The Odorama card was considered an homage to John Waters' 1981 film Polyester. Waters felt he was ripped off and realized that New Line Cinema, the studio that released Polyester, did not renew the copyright for Odorama. He later said that "a cheque would have been an homage".

== Home media ==
Rugrats Go Wild was released on VHS and DVD on December 16, 2003, by Paramount Home Entertainment. Most VHS copies included a "Smell-O-Vision" scratch-and-sniff card, as did most initial run DVDs. Later copies of the DVD did not include additional cards, but did retain the option to view the film with the scratch-and-sniff icons on.

On March 15, 2011, along with The Rugrats Movie and Rugrats in Paris: The Movie, the film was re-released in a three-disc movie trilogy collection DVD set, in honor of Rugrats' 20th anniversary. On August 29, 2017, Rugrats Go Wild was re-released on DVD. On March 8, 2022, along with The Rugrats Movie and Rugrats in Paris: The Movie, the film was released on Blu-ray as part of the trilogy movie collection.

== Video game ==
A video game based on the film of the same name was released on May 28, 2003 for Microsoft Windows and Game Boy Advance and was published by THQ and developed by ImaginEngine for both platforms.

== Reception ==
=== Box office ===
The film grossed $39 million in the United States and $16 million internationally for a worldwide total of $55 million against a production budget of $25 million. The film opened at #4 behind Finding Nemo, 2 Fast 2 Furious, and Bruce Almighty.

=== Critical response ===
On the review aggregator website Rotten Tomatoes, 40% of 88 critics' reviews are positive, with an average rating of 5/10. The website's consensus reads: "The Rugrats franchise has gone from fresh to formulaic." Metacritic, which uses a weighted average, assigned the film a score of 38 out of 100, based on 27 critics, indicating "generally unfavorable" reviews. Audiences polled by CinemaScore gave the film an average grade of "A−" on an A+ to F scale.

Neil Smith at the BBC gave the film 2 out of 5. Film4 stated the film was not as bad as other reviews suggested but "it just doesn't hold a candle to 2002's charming and superior The Wild Thornberrys Movie".

== Soundtrack ==
Rugrats Go Wild: Music from the Motion Picture

Soundtrack album by Various Artists
- Released: June 10, 2003
- Recorded: 2002–2003
- Genres: Pop; rock
- Length: 49:36
- Labels: Hollywood; Nick

Professional ratings
Review scores
Source	Rating
Allmusic	3/5 stars

An original soundtrack was released on June 10, 2003, from Hollywood Records.

The following is a list of songs that appear on the Rugrats Go Wild soundtrack.

Track list
No.	Title	Artist(s)	Length
1.	"Message in a Bottle (cover of The Police)"	American Hi-Fi	4:12
2.	"Big Bad Cat"	Bruce Willis and Chrissie Hynde	3:15
3.	"She's on Fire"	Train	3:50
4.	"Island Princess"	Cheryl Chase and Cree Summer	2:32
5.	"Lizard Love"	Aerosmith	4:35
6.	"Ready to Roll"	Flashlight Brown	2:51
7.	"The Morning After (cover of Maureen McGovern)"	Chase and Summer	3:22
8.	"Atomic Dog"	George Clinton	4:45
9.	"Dresses and Shoes"	Chase and Summer	3:28
10.	"It's a Jungle Out Here"	Summer, Nancy Cartwright, Elizabeth Daily, Tara Strong, Kath Soucie and Dionne Quan	3:11
11.	"Lust for Life (cover of Iggy Pop only seen in ending credits)"	Willis	3:43
12.	"Phil's Diapey's Hanging Low"	Tim Curry, Cartwright, Daily, Strong, Soucie and Quan	3:01
13.	"Should I Stay or Should I Go"	The Clash	3:09
14.	"Changing Faces"	Daily	3:42
Total length:			53:25
