= Pappa Pia =

2017 film

- Directed by: Gábor Csupó
- Starring: Tamás Szabó Kimmel; Bernadett Ostorhazi; Feró Nagy
- Release date: 15 August 2017
- Running time: 105 minutes
- Country: Hungary
- Language: Hungarian

Pappa Pia is a 2017 Hungarian comedy film directed by Gábor Csupó.

== Cast ==
- Tamás Szabó Kimmel as Tomi
- Bernadett Ostorhazi as Mara
- Feró Nagy as Papi
- András Stohl as Wizy
- Nutter Butter as Krazov VIII
