= Nickelodeon Party Blast =

2002 video game

- North American Xbox cover art
- Developer: Data Design Interactive
- Publisher: Infogrames
- Engine: RenderWare
- Platforms: Xbox, GameCube, Windows
- Release: Windows; NA: October 8, 2002; Xbox; NA: October 29, 2002; PAL: December 6, 2002; GameCube; NA: November 20, 2002; EU: December 6, 2002
- Genre: Party
- Modes: Single-player, multiplayer

Nickelodeon Party Blast is a party video game developed by English developer Data Design Interactive and published by Infogrames. Party Blast was released for Xbox, Windows, and GameCube in 2002. A PlayStation 2 version of the game was planned to be released, but it was cancelled for unknown reasons, though leftovers, such as a model of a DualShock 2 controller, can still be found in all versions of the game's files. The game features characters from Nicktoons, including SpongeBob SquarePants, Rugrats, The Wild Thornberrys, Rocket Power, Invader Zim, and The Adventures of Jimmy Neutron, Boy Genius, with CatDog as the hosts.

== Gameplay ==
The "Food Fight" mini-game

Players play as 8 different characters and play more than 20 stages and six different party modes. Player 1 can choose Blast, Replay, and Cup challenge (Players 2, 3, and 4 have a mode called "Party Play"). Each stage has different events although the last stage is almost opposite from the original stage when the player first starts. Every party game has each different Boss depending on 5 different events (or party modes) on which level. In Food Fight, players throw food at each other to lose lives or points and neither person can be taken away. Squirt and Splash has players squirting each other and have the person with the highest score to survival wins. In Basketball, players have to make the most baskets in the game and perform tricks to earn more points.

The Pipe Challenge is the 2nd party mode where players put pipes together to create a pipeline to blast rockets, Rugrats dinosaurs, and more. The Racing mode is the 5th party event where players race each other and see who has the most coins and mess up with items and more. Clam bonus stages are bonus stages where each different stage lets players play 4 different games to win or lose. At the end, there is also a Gooze Squirter stage where you squirt goo to Nicktoon characters and the person who goozes the most is the winner of the game and then goes back to the main menu.

== Development ==
Nickelodeon Party Blast was first shown at the Electronic Entertainment Expo in 2002. During the showing, Data Design promised unlockable bonus levels, power-ups, and boss battles.

== Reception ==
Reception

Aggregate score
Aggregator	Score
Metacritic	19/100

Review score
Publication	Score
IGN	1.1/10

The game received largely negative reviews, with most criticizing the game's controls, graphics and sound effects. Metacritic gave the Xbox version a 19 out of 100, indicating "overwhelming dislike," while IGN gave the Xbox version a 1.1 out of 10, writing, "With so many great franchises, this could've been a decent party game. Instead, what we're left with is a poor-looking, poor-sounding, and poor-playing game."
