= Paul Germain =

American children's television producer

- Born: Paul Lazarus Germain; June 6, 1959 (age 67); Los Angeles, California, U.S.
- Occupations: Writer, director, producer
- Years active: 1983–present
- Known for: Rugrats (1991–2004); Recess (1997–2001); Recess: School's Out (2001); Lloyd in Space (2001–2004); Pound Puppies (2010–2013)
- Spouse: Beatrice Mills (m. 1988)
- Children: 3

Paul Lazarus Germain (born June 6, 1959) is an American writer, director, and producer. Germain—along with Arlene Klasky and Gábor Csupó—was one of the creators of the Nickelodeon animated series Rugrats. He also co-created the series Recess and Lloyd in Space, also having worked on The Tracey Ullman Show and Even Stevens.

By the age of 24, Germain was credited on Terms of Endearment, Say Anything..., Big and Broadcast News, which was produced by James L. Brooks for Gracie Films. He worked with Rugrats colleague Joe Ansolabehere to create Disney's Recess and Lloyd in Space. Germain and Ansolabehere formed the television production company Paul & Joe Productions. They worked in tandem on Pound Puppies for Discovery Family and Disney Junior's Goldie & Bear. He was a screenwriter on the direct-to-DVD film Tinker Bell and the Great Fairy Rescue.

== Personal life ==
Germain's son was the inspiration for the Rugrats character Tommy Pickles; the antagonist, Angelica Pickles, was based on a bully from his childhood, who was also intended to be the inspiration of Chuckie Finster.

Germain is Jewish.
