= Cheryl Chase (actress) =

American voice actress (born 1958)

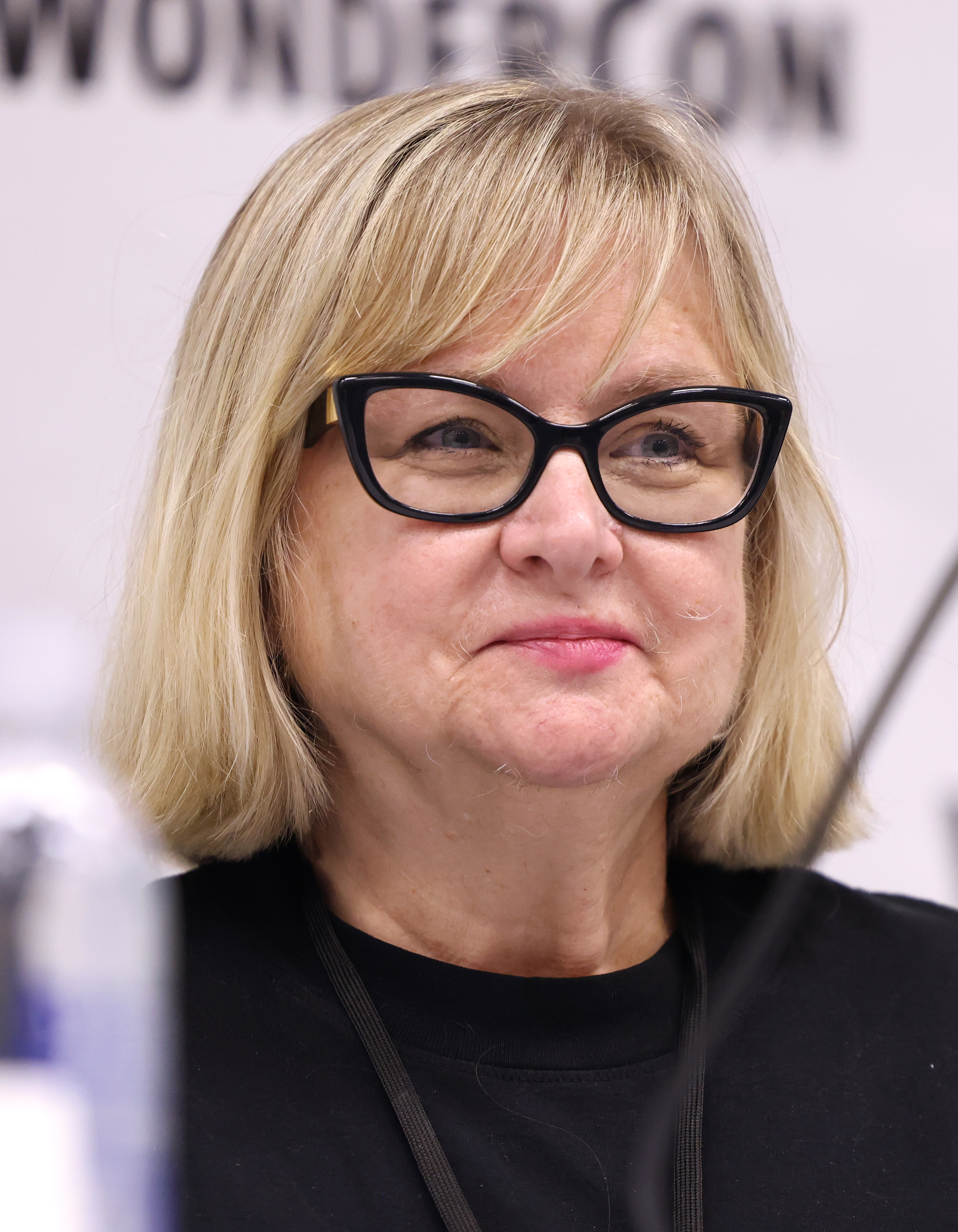
- Chase in 2026
- Born: Cheryl Christine Hudock; December 25, 1958 (age 67); Manville, New Jersey, U.S.
- Occupations: Actress; author
- Years active: 1982–present
- Spouse: Jerry Beck (m. 2021)

Cheryl Chase (born Cheryl Christine Hudock; December 25, 1958) is an American actress and children's book author. She is best known for voicing Angelica Pickles in the television series Rugrats and its spinoffs All Grown Up, Angelica and Susie's Pre-School Daze, and on the revival.

== Early life and education ==
Chase was born on Christmas Day 1958, in Manville, New Jersey, to Stella Sophia (Gnapp) Hudock and Emil Robert Hudock. Both of her parents were entertainers: her mother was an actress and her father worked as a musician. She is an only child. Chase attended Manville High School in 1977. She attended Brigham Young University majoring in early childhood education and graduated in 1981. After college, Chase was a student at the Lee Strasberg Theatre.

== Career ==
Chase, then known by her birth name Cheryl Hudock, made her onscreen debut alongside Marie Osmond in the 1982 television movie, Side by Side: The True Story of the Osmond Family. Chase is best known as the voice of Angelica Pickles on Rugrats, All Grown Up, Angelica and Susie's Pre-School Daze, and the revival of Rugrats. Chase's character Angelica Pickles placed #7 in TV Guide's "50 Greatest Cartoon Characters of All Time" (August 2002). Her programs on which she has voiced characters include The Smart Talk with Raisin Show (as Raisin), The Ren & Stimpy Show, Noozles (as "Pinky"), Nadia: The Secret of Blue Water (as "Marie" in the Streamline Pictures English dub), and Random! Cartoons (as "Nurse").

Chase was also the voice behind Little Miss Bossy and Little Miss Curious in the second season of The Mr. Men Show 2008 TV series reboot adaptation under the name Sophie Roberts.

Behind the mic, Chase provided the voice of Mei in the Streamline Pictures dub of the Hayao Miyazaki film My Neighbor Totoro as well as Sachi in the Katsuhiro Otomo film Neo Tokyo; in the early Harmony Gold English Dragon Ball dub from the 1980s, she voiced Puar (Squeaker). On the big screen Chase provided the baby sounds for Baby Pubert in Addams Family Values, an alien child in Total Recall, Diane Keaton's daughter in Baby Boom and voiced Angelica Pickles in The Rugrats Movie, Rugrats in Paris: The Movie, and Rugrats Go Wild.

Chase's first children's book, That's Coola, Tallulah!, was published in March 2021.

== Personal life ==
On June 25, 2021, she married producer and historian Jerry Beck, her boyfriend of 33 years.
