= Tommy Pickles =

Fictional character in the Rugrats franchise

- Rugrats franchise character
- Tommy as he appears in the original Rugrats series
- First appearance: "Tommy Pickles and the Great White Thing" (1990)
- Created by: Arlene Klasky; Paul Germain
- Voiced by: Tami Holbrook (pilot); E. G. Daily (1991–present)

In-universe information
- Full name: Thomas Malcolm Pickles
- Nickname: Tommy
- Species: Human
- Gender: Male
- Occupation: Student (in All Grown Up!)
- Family: Stu Pickles (father); Didi Pickles (mother); Dil Pickles (brother)
- Relatives: Lou Pickles (paternal grandfather); Trixie Pickles (paternal grandmother); Lulu Pickles (paternal step-grandmother); Boris Kropotkin (maternal grandfather); Minka Kropotkin (maternal grandmother); Drew Pickles (paternal uncle); Charlotte Pickles (paternal aunt by marriage); Angelica Pickles (paternal first cousin); Ben Kroptkin (maternal uncle); Elaine Kroptkin (maternal aunt by marriage)

Thomas Malcolm "Tommy" Pickles is a fictional character and the protagonist of Nickelodeon's Rugrats franchise. He appears in the original 1991 to 2004 animated children's television series Rugrats, its spinoff series All Grown Up!, and the computer-animated Rugrats reboot. He is also the protagonist of The Rugrats Movie (1998) and Rugrats Go Wild (2003), and a major character in Rugrats in Paris: The Movie (2000), as well as other various Rugrats-related media.

In Rugrats, Tommy is a 1-year-old baby and the leader of the show's other infant characters. He is inquisitive, wants to explore everything, and often breaks out of his crib and gets himself into unusual situations. Writer Steve Viksten said his adventurous personality was partially modeled after the actor John Wayne. All Grown Up! depicts a preteen version of Tommy.

Rugrats co-creators Paul Germain and Arlene Klasky have both claimed to have created the Tommy character, with both saying he was based upon their real-life sons. The character's first name comes from Germain's son, and he was drawn to resemble Klasky and her then-husband, fellow Rugrats co-creator Gábor Csupó's, son.

The character is voiced by E. G. Daily, who based her performance on a child character she had been developing since her youth. Daily voiced Tommy for the entire 13-year run of the Rugrats series (except the unaired pilot, where he was voiced by Tami Holbrook) as well as the films, and returned to voice the older version of the character in All Grown Up! and the 2021 reboot of the original series. The character of Tommy has been very well received by reviewers and fans, and as the central character on the network's top-rated program, he was considered pivotal in Nickelodeon's rise in the 1990s.

== Character history ==
=== Family ===
Tommy was born prematurely as Thomas Malcolm Pickles on August 11, 1990. He is the elder son of Stuart "Stu" Pickles, a self-taught inventor specializing in children's toys, and Didi Pickles (née Kropotkin), a schoolteacher. Though Stu works from home, out of the family's basement, Tommy and his younger brother, Dylan "Dil" are primarily cared for by Didi, who devotes much of her free time reading books on the latest in child development, hoping to raise her sons, and niece to be as emotionally and physically healthy as possible. As Stu is a Christian and Didi is Jewish, the family celebrates religious holidays affiliated with both Christianity and Judaism, such as Easter, Passover, Christmas, and Hanukkah. His paternal grandparents are Louis Kalhern "Lou" Pickles, and the late Beatrix "Trixie" Pickles, and his maternal grandparents are Boris Kropotkin and Minka Kropotkin. He has a paternal uncle and aunt, Andrew "Drew" and his wife, Charlotte Pickles, by whom he has a cousin, Angelica Pickles, and a maternal uncle and aunt, Benjamin "Ben" Kropotkin and his wife, Elaine Robinson-Kropotkin, who is rarely seen or mentioned.

=== Description ===
In the original Rugrats series, Tommy is almost always depicted as speaking in a soft voice and wearing only a baby blue shirt and diaper, though he wore a red-orange shirt and overalls in the first episode, "Tommy's First Birthday." He is one year old at the beginning of the series, and has only a few strands of hair, the color of which indeterminable. He is Jewish through his mother, Didi, Tommy is of European Jewish heritage, with her parents being born and raised in Russia and later immigrated to the United States. He and other babies talk to each other when adults are either not around, or are not paying attention. Tommy and other babies also talk to toddlers such as his cousin Angelica and his neighbor Susie, who are both three years old. Tommy is not able to communicate with his newborn brother, Dil, which frustrates him at times. Though the youngest of the babies, Tommy is brave and adventurous and it comes naturally for him to serve as their leader, and, in stark contrast to Angelica, who frequently serves as an antagonist, he has a strong sense of justice and is unafraid to stand up for what he believes is right.Tommy is highly inquisitive, wants to explore everything, and regularly breaks out of his crib. He often uses a plastic toy screwdriver as a tool for escaping his crib and getting into places. Because of his goodhearted nature, he is sometimes easily manipulated or lied to. He is closest to Chuckie, as Phil and Lil, being twins, spend most of their time with one another and have a strong familial bond. His catchphrase is "A baby's gotta do what a baby's gotta do."

The series All Grown Up! depicts Tommy, Dil, and the other Rugrats children as middle-schoolers. Tommy, now a preteen, bears resemblance to both his mother and father, with palatinate hair similar to Stu and a button nose similar to Didi. A nod to his childhood, Tommy still carries his toy screwdriver with him as part of his keychain. He has become less of a leader to his siblings and friends and more of an equal and while he still has a strong sense of right and wrong, he is sometimes hesitant to do the right thing for fear of being rejected or teased by peers. He has remained best friends with Chuckie throughout the years, still encouraging him to step outside of his very small comfort zone, and somewhat critical of Dil, whose abnormal tendencies sometimes embarrass or confuse him. He shows a strong interest in filmmaking. In the first season, Tommy wears a white shirt with yellow sleeves, but from the second season onward, Tommy and the other characters expanded their wardrobe and began wearing many different outfits.

=== Rugrats ===
As the main protagonist of Rugrats, Tommy appears in the majority of episodes across the show's 13-year run, with many of the storylines centering around him and his family, and with the Pickles household often serving as the primary setting. The original unaired pilot for the series, "Tommy Pickles and the Great White Thing", revolved around Tommy breaking out of his crib to travel to the bathroom and investigate the "great white thing," which is actually a toilet. The first aired episode of Rugrats was "Tommy's First Birthday", which was broadcast on Nickelodeon on August 11, 1991. It centered around Tommy first birthday and his birthday party, during which he and the other children believe that eating dog food will turn them into dogs. Some of the first season episodes featured such plotlines as Tommy journeying into a neighbor's house to retrieve a lost ball, Tommy making a mess at a fancy restaurant at his dad's work function, Tommy getting lost at the school where his mother teaches, and Tommy wandering around the stadium during a baseball game, in which he ultimately ends up playing. In the episode "Weening Tommy", his mother transition Tommy away from using a baby bottle to a Sippy cup, which he resists. Other episodes involved Tommy trying to escape from the doctor's office to avoid a shot, Tommy becoming fearful after Angelica tells him his parents will give him away at a family reunion, and Tommy developing a fear of getting sucked down the bathtub drain. One of the most notable episodes was "A Rugrats Passover", in which Tommy's Grandpa Boris tells the children the Jewish story of the Exodus on Passover. This leads the children to imagining themselves as part of the story, with Tommy playing the part of Moses.

Tommy has been featured in several other Rugrats-related works outside of the main series. He is the protagonist of The Rugrats Movie (1998), the story of which is centered around the birth of Tommy's brother; Dil. Throughout the film, Tommy struggles with the sudden change in his family's dynamic and with accepting Dil, who, being a newborn baby, does not understand the concept of sharing, cooperating, or being nice as Tommy does, which Tommy finds to be incredibly difficult to deal with. Ultimately, Tommy comes to accept Dil at the end of the film. Tommy is also featured in Rugrats in Paris: The Movie (2000), which is set in Paris and focuses primarily on the wedding of Chuckie's father, as well as Tommy's father Stu being summoned to the amusement park Reptarland to fix a malfunctioning Reptar robot. Tommy appeared as the protagonist once again in the film Rugrats Go Wild (2003), a crossover of Rugrats and the Nickelodeon animated series The Wild Thornberrys, in which Tommy and his family and friends become shipwrecked on a deserted island, where they meet the Thornberry family. Tommy made additional appearances in the straight-to-DVD films Rugrats Tales from the Crib, which were released between 2005 and 2006. In July 2018, it was announced that Tommy would appear in newly-planned Rugrats television series and a live-action film featuring characters rendered with computer-generated imagery. Plans for the movie were shelved in November 2019.

=== All Grown Up! ===
In addition to Rugrats and its related films and media, Tommy was the protagonist of All Grown Up!, which depicts him and the children from the original series as adolescents. The concept for the series derived from "All Growed Up", a special episode of Rugrats that aired on July 21, 2001, to celebrate the series' 10th anniversary, which portrayed the original characters 10 years into the future. Tommy remains the ringleader of his group of friends, though he has now developed a strong interest in filmmaking and makes movies with a camcorder. The episode "Truth or Consequences" revealed he made his first film at the age of 37 months, then made a negative film about his friends. The main storyline of "Brother, Can You Spare The Time?" opened with him mentioning recently winning a young filmmaker's award; and one storyline in the episode "Bad Aptitude" was about Tommy's sudden early retirement from filmmaking after making a flop and receiving an unfavorable (for his filmmaking aspirations) result on his career aptitude exam, though he soon reconsiders after rediscovering his filmmaking passion. However, he has not been seen with his camcorder since "The Big Score", when he was filming Lil at the soccer field.

In the episode "River Rats", Tommy was shown to be afraid of water, stemming from an experience during a fishing outing with his grandpa. Up until early Season 2, Tommy was also either shown or mentioned as being part of the school soccer team, even trying to teach Dil how to play in the episode "Fools Rush In". Tommy had his first kiss with Olivia in the episode "Fear of Falling". He also develops a romantic relationship with Rachel, who he meets at Hebrew school in the episode "Rachel, Rachel". It is also implied in the episode "TP + KF" that Tommy and Kimi Finster may have feelings for each other. All Grown Up! featured Tommy Pickles' final appearance, in the episode "Golden Boy". In January 2023, All Grown Up! got featured by CBR in the list of "10 Best Cartoons that turn 20 in 2023".

== Conception ==
Tommy was one of several characters inspired by the real-life children of the writers and creators of Rugrats at the time the show was conceived. Accounts have differed as to who originally created Tommy. Rugrats co-creators Paul Germain and Arlene Klasky have both claimed to have created the character, with both saying he was based upon their real-life sons. Both, however, say the character was named after Germain's son, Tommy Germain, who was one year old when Rugrats was created. The character was temporarily named "Ollie" during the show's creation phase before being renamed Tommy. The last name "Pickles" was a name that Germain said "just occurred to me". According to Germain, when the series was first conceived, the rule was that babies can really talk, but keep it a secret from adults. However, the rules quickly began to evolve, and the babies became a metaphor for children of all ages. In 1996, Germain stated; "whether the kids are speaking an incomprehensible language, or simply speaking when the adults can't hear [...] became a secondary issue in the show. We kept them apart when we could, cheated when we couldn't, and just let it become a secondary issue."

According to Klasky, Tommy was first illustrated by Gábor Csupó, Rugrats co-creator and Klasky's husband at the time. The character was drawn to look like Brandon Csupó, the young son of Klasky and Csupó, who Klasky described as "pigeon-toed, skinny legs, big head, no hair". Csupó has described Tommy as "a spoof on all little balding babies". After Tommy was first conceived and illustrated, Klasky said the Tommy character was further developed by Germain in his capacity as the story editor, along with his writing staff. Writer Steve Viksten portrayed Tommy as more adventurous than the other characters, and partially modeled the character after the actor John Wayne. Viksten wrote the line: "A baby’s gotta do what a baby's gotta do", which became synonymous with the character. As the series progressed, Klasky inserted more elements of her personal life into Tommy's character, such as being part of an interfaith family and being of Russian Jewish descent. Tommy has been used in various Rugrats episodes to highlight and explore irrational childhood fears, such an episode in which he avoids using the bathtub for fear that he will be sucked down the drain.

== Portrayal ==
Tommy was voiced by actress E. G. Daily (1991-2008, 2021–present). The voice Daily conceived for Tommy was one of a child character she had been developing since she her youth, and regularly performed to amuse her friends throughout her life. She described as "just a little boy character that kind of lives in me [that] wasn't derived from anything in particular." Immediately upon first seeing claymation of Tommy, she felt that voice was the correct fit for the character, describing it as "the first voice that came out of me" and "the right kind of voice for that look". Daily said of the character:

The spirit of Tommy Pickles is definitely my own. I think that was my contribution — my version of my little boy Tommy. I just understood him. He’s genuinely concerned about people. He’s genuinely empathic and definitely has a little fighter’s spirit — a little leader’s spirit. He was just sweet, and I love that I was able to bring that part to him. The part I related to was just wanting people to feel safe. He has noble friend characteristics that I think are beautiful.

Cheryl Chase had also auditioned for the part of Tommy and did not get it, but later became the voice actress for the character Angelica Pickles. Rugrats was one of the first voice-over auditions in which Daily participated. She almost did not attend because she was having carpet fitted in her apartment and did not want to leave the workers alone, but her agent encouraged her to go. She replaced a different actress used in the pilot episode and re-dubbed the first few episodes with her own performance. Daily was pregnant and went into labor during the recording of one of her Rugrats episodes. She was having contractions between takes of dialogue, and delivered the baby not long afterward. Daily voiced Tommy for the entire 13-year run of the Rugrats television show, and returned to portray the character in the Rugrats films and the All Grown Up! series. Daily said it was initially a challenge adjusting to an older voice for Tommy in the first episodes of All Grown Up!, particularly when the voice cast was "just coming in and trying to define everybody and how they’ve grown".

== Reception ==
The character of Tommy has been well received. Jane Holahan of the Lancaster New Era wrote "All kids in America love Tommy". Karen Hershenson of Contra Costa Times wrote in a 1998 article that "more than 23 million viewers tune in each week to watch Tommy". The San Jose Mercury News wrote in 1998 that "Tommy Pickles is a bigger star than George Clooney." Doug McCausland of Alternative Nation called Tommy Pickles an "iconic character". The Plain Dealer critic Joanna Connors described Tommy as "breakout hero" of the Rugrats series. Associated Press writer John Rogers praised the character's fearlessness and longevity and wrote during the show's 10 year anniversary: "Ten years ago, a bald-headed, bug-eyed baby wearing an ill-fitting diaper squirted milk onto a TV screen – and a new hero was born." The Herald News declared Tommy Pickles the best character on the series. The London Free Press described the character as "brave and caring".

The Detroit News writer positively reviewed all the Rugrats baby characters but gave particular praise to Tommy writing: "Ya gotta love 'em, especially leader Tommy Pickles". Patti Thorn of Rocky Mountain News praised Tommy, describing him as the show's most "level-headed" character, who deals with childhood issues and fears "with heart and humor". Melanie McFarland of The Seattle Times wrote: "Kids love watching the adventures of Tommy Pickles and friends because they're funny and imaginative; parents love it because the stories ring true." Los Angeles Times writer Paul Brownfield said Tommy and the other Rugrats protagonists have such longevity that they "will be adorning kids' T-shirts and lunch boxes for generations to come". Jan Susina, Professor of English at Illinois State University, described Tommy as "the leader and voice or reason among the babies", describing him as "a cartoon version of J. D. Salinger's wise child, in diapers". The Arizona Daily Star writer Phil Villarreal compared Tommy to comic strip character Charlie Brown.

Dennis King of Tulsa World praised E. G. Daily's vocal performance as Tommy, calling her a standout in a "stellar voice cast". In an otherwise negative review of The Rugrats Movie, Bob Hicks of The Oregonian singled out Tommy as one of the movie's strengths. He described him as an "appealing character" and "a kid who is sweet, brave, practical and morally engaged". A Tampa Bay Times article by Babita Persaud noted that child viewers of Rugrats particularly admired Tommy's courage. In a lukewarm review for "All Growed Up", the episode that later inspired the series All Grown Up!, Kimberly Click of Boston Herald noted that while most of the other characters are basically the same as their original incarnations in Rugrats, Tommy is "the only one that has matured". Fort Worth Star-Telegram writer Amanda Rogers noted that Tommy maintained aspects of his original goofy personality in All Grown Up! When Carlotta Harrell ran for State School Superintendent of Georgia in 2006, The Atlanta Journal-Constitution asked her what television character she identified with the most, and she replied Tommy because "he is respected by his peers because of his leadership abilities and judgment when making decisions". Tommy and the other babies of Rugrats have a star on the Hollywood Walk of Fame, the only characters from a Nickelodeon series to hold that honor. The star was added on June 28, 2001, and costumed characters of Tommy and other Rugrats babies were present for the ceremony.

Not all reviews of Tommy were entirely positive. Sarasota Herald-Tribune writer Philip Booth called the character "likable" but suggested he may not be a good role model for children. Kayla Cobb of Decider.com, who was critical of the Rugrats series, said she believed the show was too redundant because every episode revolved around Tommy deciding to "go on some huge adventure based on some flimsy premise", which inevitably led to problematic situations. In a mixed review of The Rugrats Movie, Daily Herald writer Dann Gire wrote that Tommy "looks like a fetal form of Mr. Magoo". In a review of "All Growed Up", Houston Chronicle writer Lana Berkowitz said the Tommy Pickles character worked better as a baby than as an adolescent, writing: "Although Tommy Pickles could be an interesting match for Doug's Patti Mayonnaise in another dimension, it's a relief when the kids zap back to babyhood at the end of this fantasy. Daring Tommy plays better in baggy diapers."

== Merchandise ==
In late 1998, Mattel released a doll of Tommy that sings. In the very beginning of 2005, LeapFrog released an All Grown Up! cartridge and two-book set for the LeapPad Plus Writing that featured Tommy alongside Susie Carmichael.
