= Gábor Csupó =

Hungarian animator (born 1952)

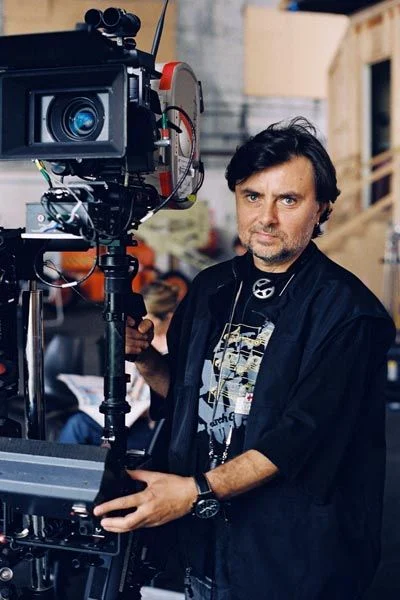
- Csupó in 2007
- Born: September 29, 1952 (age 74); Budapest, Hungarian People's Republic
- Occupations: Animator; writer; director; producer; graphic designer; cartoonist
- Years active: 1971–present
- Spouses: Arlene Klasky (m. 1979; div. 1995) Bret Crain (m. 1999; div. 2010)
- Children: 6
- Website: klaskycsupo.com

Gábor Csupó (/ˌɡɑːbɔːr ˈtʃuːpoʊ/ GAH-bor CHOO-poh, Hungarian: [ˈɡaːbor ˈtʃupoː]; born September 29, 1952) is a Hungarian animator, writer, director, producer, and graphic designer. He is co-founder of the animation studio Klasky Csupo, which produced the first three seasons of The Simpsons, as well as episodes of Rugrats, The Wild Thornberrys, Duckman, Stressed Eric, Rocket Power, As Told by Ginger, and Aaahh!!! Real Monsters.

== Early life ==
Csupó was born on September 29, 1952, to Jewish parents in Budapest, Hungary.

== Career ==
After four years at the Pannónia Filmstúdió animation studios, Csupó defected to the West in 1975, traveling along with several others, including musician Leslie Mándoki, through a railway tunnel connecting Yugoslavia and Austria. While working in Stockholm, Sweden he met Arlene Klasky, an American-born animator. The two subsequently started their own company, Klasky Csupo, which produced many popular animated television shows.

Before starting Klasky Csupo he emigrated to the United States in the late 1970s and began working as an animator for Hanna-Barbera on a few shows such as Casper and the Angels, Scooby and Scrappy-Doo, and The World's Greatest SuperFriends.

Klasky Csupo animated the short cartoons about the Simpson family which appeared on The Tracey Ullman Show (1987–1989) and continued this role on the half-hour adaptation of the characters, entitled The Simpsons, for its first three seasons (1989–1992). Csupó was credited as "animation executive producer" and "supervising animation director". Klasky Csupo animator and colorist Gyorgyi Peluce conceived the idea of the Simpsons characters having yellow skin, and Marge Simpson having blue hair, opting for something which "didn't look like anything that had come before." Csupó liked the idea, although many of the show's producers at production company Gracie Films disapproved. He noted "everybody kept saying, 'You can't have people with yellow skin', and I said, 'Why not?'" Csupó persuaded the producers and the show's creator Matt Groening to approve of the colors. Groening liked the idea, feeling that attempts to re-create human skintone on cartoons always appeared "freakish". Groening said of Csupó and Klasky, "What I love about them is their stuff looks like no one else." The character design of The Simpsons character Dr. Nick Riviera is based somewhat on Csupó. The show's animators mistakenly believed the character's voice actor, Hank Azaria, was impersonating Csupó, but Azaria said the voice was actually a "bad" imitation of Ricky Ricardo from I Love Lucy.

In 1992, Gracie Films switched domestic production of The Simpsons to Film Roman. Csupó was "asked [by Gracie Films] if they could bring in their own producer [to oversee the animation production]," but declined, stating "they wanted to tell me how to run my business." Sharon Bernstein of the Los Angeles Times wrote that "Gracie executives had been unhappy with the producer Csupó had assigned to The Simpsons and said the company also hoped to obtain better wages and working conditions for animators at Film Roman." "The Gracie statement to the Times was a bogus statement, as their action was for revenge and nothing else. All of my employees were better paid than anywhere else in the industry, and my producer did an excellent job. I stood up for my producer (Sherry Gunther), because the only thing she did was asking Fox TV to pay for all of Gracie Films' changes after their approval of all aspects of production. Gracie Films did not like that their mistakes were revealed to the network and demanded firing of an innocent hard-working producer", Csupó states. "Of course I refused to do that!" Of the 110 people he employed to animate The Simpsons, Csupó had to lay off 75. In the same year, Klasky Csupo went on to produce other shows for Viacom/Nickelodeon and USA Network, and hired almost all of the laid-off artists back plus hired about 500 more. Shows, short films, and films produced include Technological Threat, Rugrats, Duckman, The Wild Thornberrys, Rocket Power, As Told by Ginger, All Grown Up!, Santo Bugito, Stressed Eric, Alexander and the Terrible, Horrible, No Good, Very Bad Day, Immigrants, Recycle Rex, The Wacky Adventures of Ronald McDonald, What's Inside Heidi's Head?, Edith Ann: A Few Pieces of the Puzzle, and Aaahh!!! Real Monsters. His company Klasky Csupo also produced several television films and four feature animated films for Paramount Pictures: The Rugrats Movie (1998), Rugrats in Paris: The Movie (2000), Rugrats Go Wild (2003), and The Wild Thornberrys Movie (2002). The Rugrats Movie became the first non-Disney animated film in the world to earn more than $100M at the domestic box office.

His record label, Tone Casualties, founded in 1994, released several industrial, noise, ambient and experimental music releases, including discs by Holger Czukay, Drew Neumann, Paul Schütze, Kuroi Mori, Borut Kržišnik, András Wahorn, Controlled Bleeding, and his own works (sometimes under the anagrammatical pseudonym "Opus Crobag").

He also directed three live-action films outside of Klasky Csupo: Bridge to Terabithia (2007) for Walt Disney Pictures and Walden Media, The Secret of Moonacre (2008) for Warner Bros. and Lionsgate, and the musical comedy Pappa Pia (2017) for Zene Nelkul KFT, Hungary.

== Filmography ==
=== Film ===
Producer

- The Rugrats Movie (1998)
- Rugrats in Paris: The Movie (2000)
- The Wild Thornberrys Movie (2002)
- Rugrats Go Wild (2003)
- Immigrants (2008)

Director

- Bridge to Terabithia (2007)
- Immigrants (2008)
- The Secret of Moonacre (2008)
- Pappa Pia (2017)

=== Television ===
Year	Title	Creator	Executive Producer
1991–2004	Rugrats	Yes	Yes
1994–1997	Duckman	Developer	Yes
1994–1997	Aaahh!!! Real Monsters	Yes	Yes
1995	Santo Bugito	No	Yes
1998–2004	The Wild Thornberrys	Yes	Yes
1998	Stressed Eric	No	Yes
1999–2004	Rocket Power	Yes	Yes
2000–2006	As Told by Ginger	No	Yes
2003–2008	All Grown Up!	No	Yes
2021–2026	Rugrats	Yes	Yes

== Discography ==
- 1993 Allegro Absurdito (by Accidental Orchestra, Tone Casualties)
- 1994 Zombient Music (Tone Casualties)
- 1996 The Deconstructed Sounds of Karen Han – Industrium Post Mortem: China (Tone Casualties)
- 1996 The Lighter Side of Dark: A Compilation of Tone Casualties Releases (Tone Casualties)
- 1997 Colon (by Accidental Orchestra, Tone Casualties)
- 2001 Liquid Fire (Tone Casualties)
- 2002 Kalmopyrin (Tone Casualties)
- 2005 Wrong Planet (as Gábor Csupó's Field Trip, Tone Casualties)
- 2007 Pillowtron (Tone Casualties)
- 2009 Stolen Songs from Mars (Tone Casualties)
- 2010 Terrain (as Gábor Csupó's Fieldtrip, Tone Casualties)
- 2010 Ghosts of Cairo (as Gábor Csupó's FieldTRIP, Tone Casualties)
- 2013 Pretty Damn Pretty (Tone Casualties)
- 2013 Beyond (Tone Casualties)
- 2014 Why Cry When You Can Fly (as Gábor Csupó's Fieldtrip, Tone Casualties)
- 2015 Flamboyant Eruptions (Tone Casualties)
- 2017 Splendid (Grand allure Entertainment)
- 2018 Necesito Tu Amor (Grand Allure Entertainment)
- 2018 Holly Molly (Grand Allure Entertainment)
- 2018 Kingdom of Disturb-Nostalghia Remix (Grand Allure Entertainment)

== Personal life ==
Csupó has six children (two with his first wife, Arlene Klasky).

Csupó is a big fan of American musician, composer, and bandleader Frank Zappa, and credits Zappa with helping him learn the English language. His collection of Zappa albums were the only items he took with him when he emigrated from his native Hungary in the 1970s (at the time a one-party communist state under the Soviet sphere of influence). When he worked on The Simpsons, he and Matt Groening, a fellow Zappa fanatic, tried unsuccessfully to persuade the series' producers to use Zappa's music on the show. Nonetheless, he secured the rights to Zappa's music for Duckman, and its first season contained songs from throughout Zappa's career, including "Peaches en Regalia" from Hot Rats (1969), and "Take Your Clothes Off When You Dance" from We're Only in It for the Money (1968). Later, Csupó was enlisted to create the cover art for the career-spanning Zappa rarities collection The Lost Episodes, released on CD in 1996.
