= Angelica Pickles =

Fictional character in the Rugrats franchise

- Rugrats franchise character
- Angelica Pickles in the original Rugrats (left) and All Grown Up! (right)
- First appearance: "Tommy's First Birthday"; Rugrats; August 11, 1991
- Created by: Paul Germain
- Voiced by: Cheryl Chase

In-universe information
- Full name: Angelica Charlotte Pickles
- Gender: Female
- Occupation: Student (in All Grown Up!)
- Family: Drew Pickles (father); Charlotte Pickles (mother)
- Relatives: Lou Pickles (paternal grandfather); Trixie Pickles (paternal grandmother); Lulu Pickles (paternal step-grandmother); Stu Pickles (paternal uncle); Didi Pickles (paternal aunt by marriage); Tommy Pickles (paternal first cousin); Dil Pickles (paternal first cousin)

Angelica Charlotte Pickles is a fictional character who appears in Nickelodeon's Rugrats franchise. She appears in all TV series in the franchise, including Rugrats (1991–2004), All Grown Up! (2003–2008), Rugrats Pre-School Daze (2005), and the computer-animated Rugrats reboot series (2021–2026), and is one of the series' original characters. A 3-year-old little girl in Rugrats, Angelica is the daughter and only child of Drew and Charlotte Pickles.

In 2002, TV Guide ranked her seventh in their list of "Top 50 Greatest Cartoon Characters of All Time". American publication Paste later ranked Pickles 46th on their "50 Best Cartoon Characters of All Time" list in 2024.

== In Rugrats ==
Angelica Pickles is Tommy and Dil's spoiled, blonde-haired, 3-year-old cousin, who frequently bullies or manipulates the babies for her own gain, earning a perception as the "mean girl" character. Angelica maintains a rivalry with Susie Carmichael, Tommy's neighbor, who tries to convince the babies that Angelica is dishonest and manipulative. Angelica's hard-working parents, Drew and Charlotte, are wealthy and often preoccupied with their jobs, resulting in her aunt Didi and uncle Stu often babysitting her.

=== Development ===
Initially, Arlene Klasky did not like the cruelty in Angelica in the earlier seasons and often had disputes with the writers about it. By the time the new seasons appeared, Klasky had a more positive reception to the softened Angelica.
