= Rugrats =

American animated television series (1991–2004)

- Genre: Comedy; Adventure; Slapstick; Surreal humor; Animated sitcom
- Created by: Arlene Klasky; Gábor Csupó; Paul Germain
- Showrunners: Arlene Klasky; Gábor Csupó; Paul Germain (seasons 1–3)
- Voices of: E. G. Daily; Christine Cavanaugh; Nancy Cartwright; Cheryl Chase; Tara Strong; Kath Soucie; Dionne Quan; Cree Summer; Jack Riley; Melanie Chartoff; David Doyle; Joe Alaskey; Michael Bell; Tress MacNeille; Philip Proctor; Julia Kato; Hattie Winston
- Theme music composer: Mark Mothersbaugh
- Composers: Mark Mothersbaugh; Denis M. Hannigan; Bob Mothersbaugh; Rusty Andrews
- Country of origin: United States
- Original language: English
- No. of seasons: 9
- No. of episodes: 172 (327 segments) (list of episodes)

Production
- Executive producers: Klasky Csupo: Arlene Klasky; Gábor Csupó; Nickelodeon: Vanessa Coffey (seasons 1–3); Mary Harrington (seasons 4–5)
- Producers: Rick Gitelson; Cella Nichols Duffy; Geraldine Clarke (seasons 2–3); David Blum; Kate Boutilier
- Editors: Karl Garabedian; John Bryant; Jerry Klovisky
- Running time: 23 minutes
- Production company: Klasky Csupo

Original release
- Network: Nickelodeon
- Release: August 11, 1991 – August 1, 2004

Related
- The Rugrats Movie; Rugrats in Paris: The Movie; All Grown Up!; Rugrats Go Wild; Rugrats

Rugrats is an American animated television series created by Arlene Klasky, Gábor Csupó and Paul Germain and produced by the former two's company, Klasky Csupo, for Nickelodeon. The series focuses on a group of toddlers, most prominently Tommy Pickles, Chuckie Finster and twins Phil and Lil, whose day-to-day experiences become much greater adventures in their imaginations.

The series premiered on August 11, 1991, as one of Nickelodeon's original three animated series known as "Nicktoons". It initially ran for 65 episodes before production was halted, but its popularity through reruns led to the production of new episodes beginning in 1996. Rugrats ultimately ran for 172 episodes across nine seasons, with its final episode airing on August 1, 2004. Its popularity also led to three theatrical films and the sequel series All Grown Up!.

Rugrats became one of Nickelodeon's longest-running animated series and was the network's top-rated series from 1995 to 2001. It received more than 20 awards, including four Daytime Emmy Awards and six Kids' Choice Awards, as well as a star on the Hollywood Walk of Fame. A reboot of the series, executive-produced by the original creative team of Klasky, Csupó and Germain, premiered on Paramount+ in 2021.

== Premise ==
=== Characters ===
Rugrats sports a vast array of secondary and tertiary characters.

The series focuses on the experiences of a courageous, adventurous one-year-old baby named Tommy Pickles and his group of playmates – several other infants and toddlers, some of whom debuted later in the series. His playmates include Chuckie, Tommy's bespectacled, red-headed, insecure, cowardly two-year-old best friend, the twins Phil and Lil, Tommy's next-door neighbors noted for their revolting eccentricities, Tommy's baby brother Dil, who was born in The Rugrats Movie, Angelica, Tommy and Dil's outrageously spoiled and selfish three-year-old cousin who is a "rival" of his friends, Kimi, Chuckie's adventurous, playful stepsister (later his adopted sister in the seventh-season episode "Finsterella") who is introduced in Rugrats in Paris: The Movie, and Susie, a good-hearted neighbor of the Pickles family, who protects the babies from Angelica, with whom she often butts heads.

The other characters depicted in Rugrats include the babies' parents, grandparents, and pets. Parental figures include Didi and Stu Pickles, Tommy and Dil's mother and father, Chas Finster, Chuckie's mild-mannered father, Kira, Chuckie's sweet-natured, kind and understanding stepmother (later his adopted mother) whom Chas marries in Rugrats in Paris: The Movie, Drew Pickles, Angelica's indulgent and doting father, Charlotte Pickles, Angelica's workaholic mother, Betty DeVille, Phil and Lil's easy-going yet boisterous feminist mother, and Howard DeVille, the twins' mild-mannered and soft-spoken father. Grandparents include Lou Pickles, Drew and Stu's father and Tommy, Angelica, and Dil's grandfather, Lulu, Lou's second elderly wife that appeared in later seasons of the series, and Didi's parents, Boris and Minka, who are Jewish immigrants. The Pickles family also own a dog named Spike and a cat belonging to Angelica named Fluffy.

In the series, babies talk to each other whenever adults are either not around, or are not paying attention. The babies have a limited understanding of the world. Toddlers Angelica and Susie talk to the babies as well and also communicate with adults, as they act as a bridge between the two worlds.

=== Setting ===
Tommy's house, the primary setting of Rugrats

Many of the adventures in which the babies find themselves take place at Tommy's house; the parents usually rely on Didi, Stu, or Grandpa Lou (Stu’s father) to babysit the kids while they run errands. Their address is revealed on an invoice in the season one episode "Tommy's First Birthday" as 1258 N. Highland, the original address of Klasky Csupo in Los Angeles. However, the specific city or state is never mentioned in the series. Several indicators, such as a state flag at a post office, license plate designs on the vehicles, and various trips to the Grand Canyon, Las Vegas, and the beach, place the characters somewhere in southern California.

The location is also hinted at during the season one episode "Little Dude" when Didi, who is a teacher, takes Tommy to her class at Eucaipah High School, referencing the city of Yucaipa, California. It has been implied that this ambiguity was done intentionally to help give the impression of seeing the world through the eyes of the babies, who would not understand the concept of location. The DeVilles live next door to the Pickles and, midway through the second season, the Carmichaels move in across the street.

== Episodes ==
During the first six seasons of Rugrats, episodes were primarily divided into two eleven-minute segments. After the second movie, during season seven, Rugrats aired with a format of three seven-minute segments per episode, though it returned to its original format in the final two seasons.

Season	Segments	Episodes	Originally released	
Season	Segments	Episodes	First released	Last released
Pilot			August 7, 2001 (VHS/DVD)	
1	25	13	August 11, 1991	December 22, 1991
2	51	26	September 13, 1992	May 23, 1993
3	51	26	September 26, 1993	April 13, 1995
4	28	15	December 4, 1996	November 22, 1997
5	25	14	May 29, 1998	November 10, 1998
6	64	36	January 18, 1999	July 20, 2001
7	37	15	January 15, 2001	December 11, 2001
8	22	13	February 9, 2002	April 10, 2004
9	24	14	September 21, 2002	August 1, 2004
Tales from the Crib	—N/a	2	November 13, 2005	November 5, 2006

== Production ==
Episodes took up to a year in advance to produce. After the episode's story was written and approved, the next phase consisted of voice recording, storyboarding, pre-eliminating animation, overseas production, overseas delivery, followed by editing and polishing.

=== Development ===
Rugrats was created by the then-husband-and-wife duo of Gábor Csupó and Arlene Klasky, along with Paul Germain in mid-1989. At the time, the duo's production company, Klasky Csupo, was a major animation firm, which also provided services for commercials and music videos, while Germain was an associate producer for Gracie Films. Klasky Csupo also animated The Simpsons, itself created by Matt Groening and produced by Gracie Films, at the time, which they would continue to do until 1992 when Gracie Films switched domestic production to Film Roman. The trio decided to create their own series in reaction to a proclamation by the children's cable network Nickelodeon that they were to launch their own line of animated series, which would be subsequently called "Nicktoons". The network's Vice President of Animation Vanessa Coffey approached them to create a pilot for their new series. With the comedic stimulation branching from the antics of Klasky and Csupó's infant children and pulling inspiration from the Beatles, the 6 1/2–minute pilot episode, "Tommy Pickles and the Great White Thing" (which never aired) was created.

Peter Chung, along with Klasky and Csupó, co-designed the characters and directed the series pilot, as well as the opening sequence. In a Decider article, Chung said, "He [Gábor] wanted the babies to be 'strange' instead of 'cute.'" The production was completed in 1990, and they submitted it to Nickelodeon, who tested it with an audience of children. The feedback for the pilot episode was primarily positive. With that, Coffey and then-network president Geraldine Laybourne greenlit the series. Chuckie and Angelica were added as characters. Following the success of its first season, Nickelodeon renewed the series for its second season in November 1991.

Germain, who felt that the series needed a bully, based Angelica on a girl bully from his childhood and decided the character would be a spoiled brat. Klasky initially disliked Angelica and also protested her actions in episodes like "Barbecue Story", where she throws Tommy's ball over the fence. In a New Yorker article, Klasky said, "I think she's a bully. I never liked Angelica." Klasky never fully approved of Angelica's character development. In addition, Angelica became problematic for some Rugrats staff. When her voice actress, Cheryl Chase, had problems portraying a mean Angelica, Steve Viksten, one of the writers, would mention that Angelica was the series' J. R. Ewing. After seeing Angelica in The Rugrats Movie, Klasky commented, "I think she's great for the show; I love Angelica."

=== Writing ===
According to Germain, when the series was first conceived, the rule was that babies can really talk, but keep it a secret from adults (e.g., in the unaired pilot in which the babies wait for adults to leave the room before speaking to each other). However, the rules quickly began to evolve, and the babies became a metaphor for children of all ages. During production of the first season, in June 1991, Germain and his fellow writers would argue among themselves over whether the adults could not understand the babies' talking, or whether the babies only spoke to each other when adults were not around. Subsequently, they tried a little of both, although later in the season, the writers would have the babies talk to each other while adults were in the same room, as long as there was a lot of space between them. By the end of the season, the writers allowed the babies to talk to each other while in their strollers as long as adults were not in the same shot. Germain stated, "whether the kids are speaking an incomprehensible language, or simply speaking when the adults can't hear [...] became a secondary issue in the show. We kept them apart when we could, cheated when we couldn't, and just let it become a secondary issue."

=== Voice actors ===
Through its full run, Rugrats had a steady array of main voice actors. E. G. Daily voices Tommy Pickles, except in the unaired pilot where Tami Holbrook provides the voice; Christine Cavanaugh originally voiced Chuckie Finster, but Cavanaugh left the series for personal reasons and was subsequently replaced by Nancy Cartwright near the end of 2001. The fraternal twins, Phil and Lil, and their mother, Betty, are voiced by Kath Soucie; Dil Pickles and Timmy McNulty are voiced by Tara Strong. Cheryl Chase, who initially auditioned for the role of Tommy, was brought on board to be cast as the voice of Angelica Pickles. Dionne Quan voices Kimi Finster. Susie is voiced by Cree Summer except for two episodes when Summer was unavailable, and Daily filled in for her instead. Other regular voice actors include Jack Riley as Stu Pickles, Melanie Chartoff as Didi Pickles and Grandma Minka Kropotkin, Michael Bell as Drew Pickles, Chas Finster and Grandpa Boris Kropotkin, Tress MacNeille as Charlotte Pickles, Phil Proctor as Howard DeVille, Julia Kato as Kira Finster, Hattie Winston as Dr. Lucy Carmichael, Ron Glass as Randy Carmichael and David Doyle as Grandpa Lou Pickles until his death in 1997, after which Joe Alaskey took over until the series' end. In 2000, Debbie Reynolds joined the cast as Lulu Pickles, Lou's second wife, and remained until the series' end.

=== Animation ===
Overseas animation for the series was done at Wang Film Productions for the pilot and its first-season, and Anivision and Sunwoo Entertainment for the rest of the series. It was followed by editing and polishing before its master tapes were sent to Nickelodeon.

=== Music ===
The theme song for Rugrats is composed by Mark Mothersbaugh, who also composed the main music for the series, along with Denis M. Hannigan, Rusty Andrews, and his brother Bob Mothersbaugh.

== Themes ==
Rugrats visualizes ordinary, everyday activities through the eyes of a group of toddlers. Using their imaginations, the babies transform routine tasks into surprising adventures. The babies, having a limited understanding of the world, constantly mispronounce words and use improper grammar. Challenges often emerge because the babies misinterpret the adults, usually caused by Angelica's deceptive translations. The grown-ups of Rugrats are simultaneously quirky, over-cautious, and oblivious. The series portrays adults as mysterious eccentrics. Episodes usually center on a moral lesson that the babies learn during their imaginative explorations.

== Release ==
=== Broadcast ===
Rugrats was Nickelodeon's second Nicktoon, debuting on the same day as Doug (which debuted before) and The Ren & Stimpy Show (which debuted after). After the first run of the series, which was produced from 1990 to 1993, production went on a hiatus, co-creator/co-writer Paul Germain left the series, and episodes that had not yet aired continued to be released through 1994. In 1995 and 1996, two Jewish-themed specials premiered; "A Rugrats Passover" and "A Rugrats Chanukah", respectively, and the rest of the series aired in reruns. Production on new episodes restarted in 1996 with a new writing staff, and the series aired in Nickelodeon's SNICK block from 1997 to 2001. From 1994 until 2012, Rugrats was the longest-running Nickelodeon animated series, with 172 episodes produced across its 13-year run. This record was surpassed in 2012 by SpongeBob SquarePants with the episode "Squiditis/Demolition Doofus".

On July 21, 2001, in celebration of its 10th anniversary, Nickelodeon aired the television special All Growed Up, which featured the characters ten years older. After the special, the network aired a retrospective titled Rugrats: Still Babies After All These Years, narrated by Amanda Bynes. Because of the special's ratings and popularity, Nickelodeon commissioned All Grown Up!, a series about the characters after they have aged up, which ran from 2003 to 2008. Rugrats ended on August 1, 2004.

=== Home media ===
From 1993 to 1996, Sony Wonder released six VHS tapes of the series.

Amazon.com's service CreateSpace once released manufacture-on-demand DVDs of new and old Nickelodeon shows. Season 3 and 4 were released on September 23, 2011. Season 5 was released shortly after on October 4. On October 6, 2011, the complete Seasons 6–8 were released, and Season 9 was released in a "Best of" collection. Amazon re-released seasons 2 & 9 as complete seasons on May 9, 2014. By February 2017, these releases were discontinued.

In May 2017, Paramount Home Media Distribution released Seasons 1 and 2 on DVD. In February 2018, Paramount Home Media Distribution released Seasons 3 and 4 on DVD. On May 18, 2021, Paramount Home Entertainment released Rugrats: The Complete Series on DVD.

In Australia, all seasons were released on DVD by Beyond Home Entertainment, Shock Entertainment and Via Vision Entertainment.

Rugrats home media releases
Season	Title	Format	Release dates		
Season	Title	Format	Region 1	Region 2	Region 4
1	Road Trip	VHS	June 13, 1995	—N/a	—N/a
1	Tommy Troubles	VHS	October 15, 1996; February 25, 1997; October 7, 1997; September 8, 1998	—N/a	—N/a
1	Tales from the Crib	VHS	August 31, 1993; October 15, 1996; October 7, 1997	—N/a	—N/a
1	A Baby's Gotta Do What a Baby's Gotta Do	VHS	August 31, 1993; October 15, 1996; October 7, 1997	—N/a	—N/a
1	Season 1	DVD	June 2, 2009	—N/a	December 4, 2013
1	Season 1	DVD	May 2, 2017	—N/a	December 4, 2013
1	Outdoor Shenanigans!	DVD	July 8, 2014	—N/a	—N/a
1	The Complete Series	DVD	May 18, 2021	—N/a	October 31, 2017
2	Mushfest	VHS	January 18, 1994	—N/a	—N/a
2	Tommy Troubles	VHS	October 15, 1996; February 25, 1997; October 7, 1997	—N/a	—N/a
2	Tales from the Crib	VHS	August 31, 1993; October 15, 1996; October 7, 1997	—N/a	—N/a
2	A Baby's Gotta Do What a Baby's Gotta Do	VHS	August 31, 1993; October 15, 1996; October 7, 1997	—N/a	—N/a
2	Chuckie the Brave	VHS	April 12, 1994; October 15, 1996; October 7, 1997; September 8, 1998	—N/a	—N/a
2	The Santa Experience	VHS	August 30, 1994; October 15, 1996; October 7, 1997; September 8, 1998; August 29, 2000 (English/French/Spanish)	—N/a	—N/a
2	Angelica the Divine	VHS	April 12, 1994; October 15, 1996; October 7, 1997; September 8, 1998	—N/a	—N/a
2	Grandpa's Favorite Stories	VHS	February 25, 1997; October 7, 1997	—N/a	—N/a
2	Diapered Duo	VHS	January 13, 1998	—N/a	—N/a
2	Mommy Mania	VHS	April 7, 1998	—N/a	—N/a
2	Decade in Diapers: Volume 1	VHS	August 7, 2001	—N/a	—N/a
2	Decade in Diapers	DVD	September 24, 2002	—N/a	—N/a
2	Nick Picks Holiday	DVD	September 26, 2006	—N/a	—N/a
2	Season 2	DVD	May 9, 2014	—N/a	December 4, 2013
2	Season 2	DVD	May 2, 2017	—N/a	December 4, 2013
2	The Complete Series	DVD	May 18, 2021	—N/a	October 31, 2017
3	Phil and Lil, Double Trouble	VHS	October 15, 1996; February 25, 1997; October 7, 1997	—N/a	—N/a
3	Passover	VHS	February 20, 1996; October 15, 1996	—N/a	—N/a
3	Grandpa's Favorite Stories	VHS	February 25, 1997; October 7, 1997	—N/a	—N/a
3	Bedtime Bash	VHS	October 7, 1997	—N/a	—N/a
3	Thanksgiving	VHS	October 21, 1997; September 8, 1998	—N/a	—N/a
3	Season 3	DVD	September 23, 2011	—N/a	April 2, 2014
3	Season 3	DVD	February 6, 2018	—N/a	April 2, 2014
3	The Complete Series	DVD	May 18, 2021	—N/a	October 31, 2017
4	Vacation	VHS	July 8, 1997; August 29, 2000 (English/French/Spanish)	—N/a	—N/a
4	Thanksgiving	VHS	October 21, 1997	—N/a	—N/a
4	Chanukah	VHS	October 7, 1997	—N/a	—N/a
4	Mommy Mania	VHS	April 7, 1998	—N/a	—N/a
4	Angelica Knows Best	VHS	June 9, 1998	—N/a	—N/a
4	Decade in Diapers	DVD	September 24, 2002	—N/a	—N/a
4	Holiday Celebration	DVD	August 31, 2004	—N/a	—N/a
4	Season 4	DVD	September 23, 2011	—N/a	June 4, 2014
4	Season 4	DVD	February 6, 2018	—N/a	June 4, 2014
4	The Complete Series	DVD	May 18, 2021	—N/a	October 31, 2017
5	Dr. Tommy Pickles	VHS	January 13, 1998; August 29, 2000 (English/French/Spanish)	—N/a	—N/a
5	Season 5	DVD	October 4, 2011	—N/a	June 4, 2014
5	The Complete Series	DVD	May 18, 2021	—N/a	October 31, 2017
6	Runaway Reptar	VHS	August 3, 1999	—N/a	—N/a
6	Make Room for Dil	VHS	October 5, 1999	—N/a	—N/a
6	I Think I Like You	VHS	January 11, 2000	—N/a	—N/a
6	Discover America	VHS	May 5, 2000	—N/a	—N/a
6	Decade in Diapers: Volume 1	VHS	August 7, 2001	—N/a	—N/a
6	Decade in Diapers	DVD	September 24, 2002	—N/a	—N/a
6	The Show Must Go On!	DVD	—N/a	September 27, 2004	—N/a
6	The Show Must Go On!	VHS	—N/a	September 27, 2004	—N/a
6	Season 6	DVD	October 6, 2011	—N/a	June 4, 2014
6	The Complete Series	DVD	May 18, 2021	—N/a	October 31, 2017
6	Outdoor Shenanigans!	DVD	July 8, 2014	—N/a	—N/a
6	Reptar Returns!	DVD	July 8, 2014	—N/a	—N/a
7	Decade in Diapers: Volume 2	VHS	August 7, 2001	—N/a	—N/a
7	Kwanzaa	VHS	September 25, 2001	—N/a	—N/a
7	Decade in Diapers	DVD	September 24, 2002	—N/a	—N/a
7	Nick Picks #1	DVD	May 24, 2005	—N/a	—N/a
7	Season 7	DVD	October 6, 2011	—N/a	December 3, 2014
7	The Complete Series	DVD	May 18, 2021	—N/a	October 31, 2017
8	All Growed Up	VHS	August 7, 2001	—N/a	—N/a
8	Easter	VHS	February 5, 2002	—N/a	—N/a
8	Halloween	VHS	August 27, 2002	—N/a	—N/a
8	Halloween	DVD	September 20, 2011	—N/a	—N/a
8	Mysteries	DVD	January 28, 2003	—N/a	—N/a
8	Mysteries	VHS	January 28, 2003	—N/a	—N/a
8	Nicktoons Halloween	DVD	August 26, 2003	—N/a	—N/a
8	Halloween Spooky Stories	DVD	—N/a	October 17, 2005	—N/a
8	Nick Picks #2	DVD	October 18, 2005	—N/a	—N/a
8	Season 8	DVD	October 6, 2011	—N/a	December 3, 2014
8	The Complete Series	DVD	May 18, 2021	—N/a	October 31, 2017
9	Christmas	VHS	September 24, 2002	—N/a	—N/a
9	Nicktoons Christmas	DVD	September 30, 2003	—N/a	—N/a
9	Holiday Celebration	DVD	August 31, 2004	—N/a	—N/a
9	Season 9	DVD	May 9, 2014	—N/a	December 3, 2014
9	The Complete Series	DVD	May 18, 2021	—N/a	October 31, 2017

Other releases
Title	Episode count	Movie count	Release date	Episodes
The Trilogy Movie Collection	0	3	March 15, 2011 (DVD); March 8, 2022 (Blu-ray)	Disc 1: The Rugrats Movie; Disc 2: Rugrats in Paris: The Movie; Disc 3: Rugrats Go Wild

=== Streaming ===
As of March 4, 2021, all seasons are available on Paramount+.

== Reception ==
=== Ratings ===
In 1994, "A Rugrats Passover" received a Nielsen rating of 3.1, with a 4.8% share of American audiences, making it the sixth most-watched cable telecast that week. In 1996, Rugrats episodes had aired 655 times over the course of the calendar year, and it remained one of cable television's most-watched series that year. In February 1996, Rugrats reached a record of 19.1 million viewers per week, becoming the highest-rated kids program on cable. In November 1996, the series surpassed itself with 20.8 million viewers per week. In December 1996, "A Rugrats Chanukah" received a Nielsen rating of 7.9 in the show's target demographic of children aged 2–11.

On November 10, 1998, the fourth-season episode "The Turkey Who Came to Dinner" became Nickelodeon's highest-rated program, with a Nielsen rating of 9.4, which totaled 3.7 million viewers among kids 2-11. On January 18, 1999, it was surpassed by the sixth-season episodes "Chuckie's Duckling" and "A Dog's Life", all of which earned a 13.8 Nielsen rating. On July 21, 2001, the series' special "All Growed Up" became Nickelodeon's highest-rated program among kids 2-11, earning a Nielsen rating of 20.4 with a 70% share. It remains as the series' highest-rated episode.

=== Critical reception and legacy ===
In a 1995 interview, Steven Spielberg referred to the series as one of several shows that were the best children's programming at the time. Spielberg described Rugrats as "sort of a TV Peanuts of our time". Rugrats was also considered a strong point in Nickelodeon's rise in the 1990s. In a press release celebrating the series' 10th anniversary, Cyma Zarghami stated, "During the past decade, Rugrats has evolved from a ratings powerhouse, being the number one children's show on TV, to pop icon status. It has secured a place in the hearts of both kids and adults, who see it from their own point of view". According to Nickelodeon producers, this series made them the number-one cable channel in the 1990s. Jeff Jarvis reviewed Rugrats and stated, "When The Simpsons was a segment on The Tracey Ullman Show, it was just a belch joke with hip pretensions. As a series, it grew flesh and guts. It was my favorite cartoon. Until I discovered Nickelodeon's Rugrats, a sardonic, sly, kid's-eye view of the world that skewers thirty-something parents and Cosby kids."

=== Controversy ===
Rugrats was noteworthy among contemporary children's television for depicting observant, identifiable Jewish families. Jewish, Christian, and Muslim religious groups gave the series high praises for their special holiday episodes. Nonetheless, at one point the Anti-Defamation League and The Washington Post editorial page castigated the series for its depiction of Tommy Pickles' maternal grandparents, accusing their character designs of resembling Nazi-era depictions of Jews.

=== Awards and nominations ===
Year	Association	Award category	Nominee	Result
1992	Daytime Emmy Award	Outstanding Animated Program		Won
1993	Daytime Emmy Award	Outstanding Animated Children's Program		Nominated
1994	CableAce	Animated Programming Special or Series		Won
1994	Daytime Emmy Award	Outstanding Animated Children's Program		Won
1995	Annie Award	Best Individual Achievement for Writing in the Field of Animation	Episode: "A Rugrats Passover"	Nominated
1995	Humanitas Prize	Children's Animation Category	Episode: "I Remember Melville"	Nominated
1995	CableAce	Animated Programming Special or Series		Nominated
1995	Daytime Emmy Award	Outstanding in Animation		Won
1995	Daytime Emmy Award	Outstanding Animated Children's Program		Nominated
1995	Emmy Award	Outstanding Animated Program (for Programming One Hour or Less)	"A Rugrats Passover"	Nominated
1996	Kids' Choice Awards	Favorite Cartoon		Won
1997	Annie Award	Best Animated Home Entertainment Production	A Rugrats Vacation	Nominated
1997	Emmy Award	Outstanding Animated Program (for Programming One Hour or Less)	"Mother's Day"	Nominated
1997	Kids' Choice Awards	Favorite Cartoon		Won
1997	Young Artist Awards	Best Performance in a Voiceover	Charity Sanoy for "Dust Bunnies"/"Educating Angelica"	Nominated
1997	CableAce	Best Writing in a Children's Special Or Series	Episode: "Mother's Day"	Won
1998	Kids' Choice Awards	Favorite Cartoon		Won
1998	Humanitas Prize	Children's Animation Category	Episode: "Mother's Day"	Nominated
1999	Emmy Award	Outstanding Children's Program		Nominated
1999	Genesis Award	Television – Children's Programming	Episode: "The Turkey That Came to Dinner"	Won
1999	Kids' Choice Awards	Favorite Cartoon		Won
1999	Humanitas Prize	Children's Animation Category	Episode: "Autumn Leaves"	Won
1999	TV Guide Award	Favorite Children's Show		Nominated
1999	World Animation Celebration	Best Director of Animation for a Daytime Series	Episode: "Naked Tommy"	Won
1999	Kids Choice Awards	Favorite Movie	The Rugrats Movie	Won
1999	Cable Guide	Favorite Cartoon		Nominated
2000	Artios Award	Best Casting for Animated Voice Over – Television		Nominated
2000	Kid's Choice Awards	Favorite Cartoon		Won
2000	Emmy Award	Outstanding Children's Program		Nominated
2000	TV Guide Award	Favorite Children's Show		Won
2001	Artios Award	Best Casting for Animated Voice Over – Television		Nominated
2001	Emmy Award	Outstanding Children's Program		Nominated
2001	Kids' Choice Awards	Favorite Cartoon		Won
2001	Television Critics Association Awards	Outstanding Achievement in Children's Programming		Nominated
2001	Jewish Image Awards	Outstanding Achievement		Won
2002	Artios Award	Best Casting for Animated Voice Over – Television	Episode: "Cynthia Comes Alive"	Nominated
2002	Emmy Award	Outstanding Children's Program	Special: "All Growed Up"	Nominated
2002	Kid's Choice Awards	Favorite Cartoon		Nominated
2002	BMI Cable Award			Won
2003	Artios Award	Best Casting for Animated Voice Over – Television	Episode: "Babies in Toyland"	Nominated
2003	Kid's Choice Awards	Favorite Cartoon		Nominated
2003	Daytime Emmy Award	Outstanding Children's Animated Program		Won
2003	BMI Cable Award			Won
2004	Daytime Emmy Award	Outstanding Children's Animated Program		Nominated

=== Honors ===
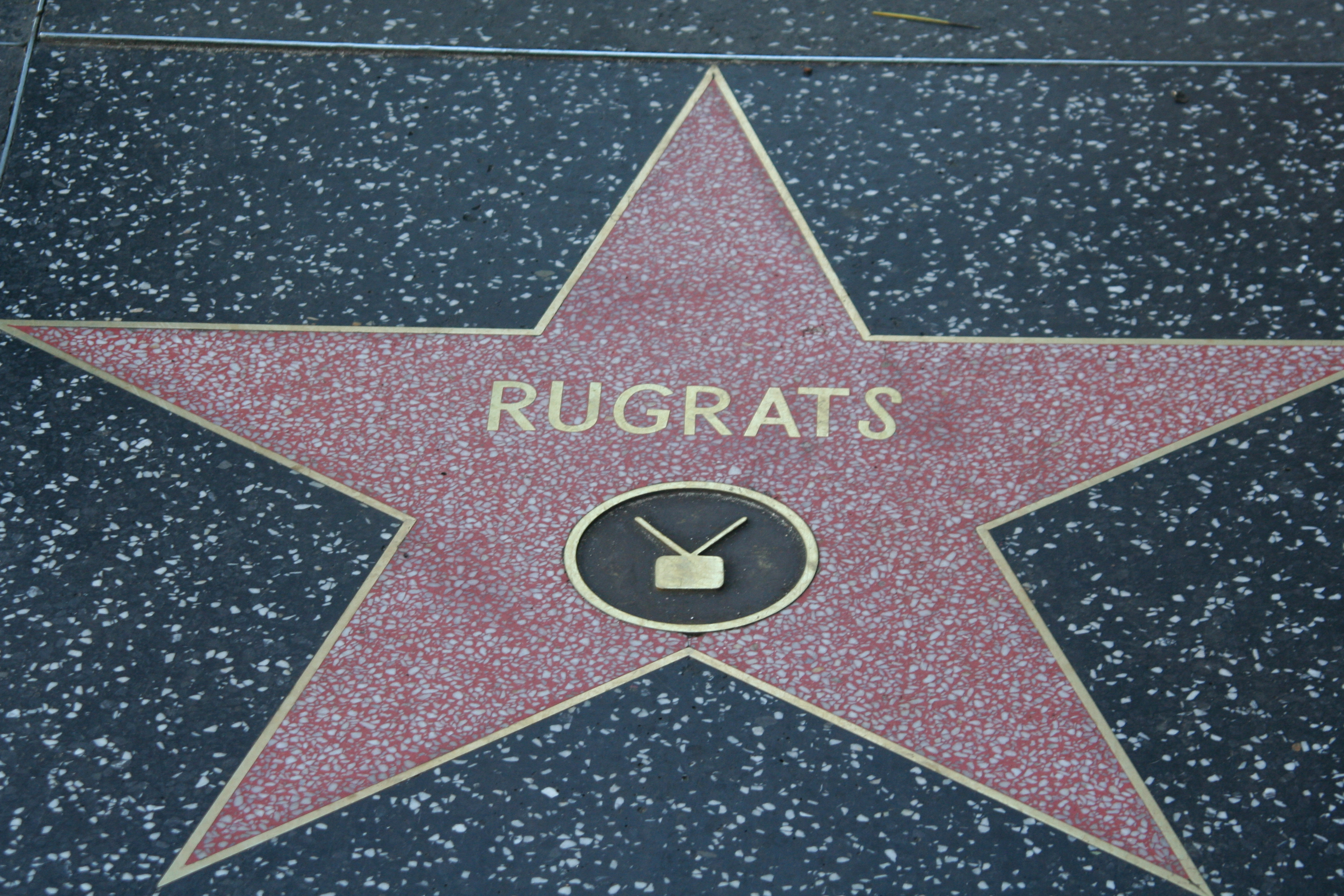
The Rugrats received a star on the Hollywood Walk of Fame in a ceremony on June 28, 2001, commemorating the show's 10th anniversary.

On June 28, 2001, in commemoration of their tenth anniversary, Rugrats received a star on the fabled Hollywood Walk of Fame, making it Nickelodeon's first series to receive a star. It was placed at 6600 W. Hollywood Blvd., near Cherokee Ave., outside a toy and costume shop. In the October 2001 issue of Wizard Magazine, a leading magazine for comic book fans, they released the results of the "100 Greatest Toons ever", as selected by their readers; Rugrats ranked at No. 35. Three other Nicktoons—SpongeBob SquarePants, Invader Zim, and Ren and Stimpy—also placed on the list. In a list of TV Land's "The 2000 Best Things About Television", ranking the all-time TV shows, channels, commercials, people, catch phrases, etc., Rugrats is ranked No. 699.

The original series was named the 92nd-best animated series by IGN. Angelica Pickles placed seventh in TV Guide's list of "Top 50 Greatest Cartoon Characters of All Time" in 2002. On September 24, 2013, in honor of their 60th anniversary, Rugrats earned a spot on TV Guide's "60 Greatest Cartoons of All Time" list. In 2017, James Charisma of Paste ranked the series' opening sequence #11 on a list of The 75 Best TV Title Sequences of All Time.

== Franchise ==
=== Films ===
In 1998, The Rugrats Movie was released, which introduced Dil, Tommy's little brother, to the series. Its worldwide gross was $140.9 million against a $24 million budget, though it received mixed reviews from critics. In 2000, a sequel, Rugrats in Paris: The Movie, was released, with three new characters introduced, Kimi, Kira, and Fifi. Kimi would become Chuckie's sister and Kira would become his new mother, after marrying his father. Fifi would become Spike's new mate and Chuckie's new dog. It too was a box office success and also received a more positive critical reception. In 2003, Rugrats Go Wild was released. It was a crossover between the Rugrats and The Wild Thornberrys. It was the least successful Rugrats film both critically and commercially. The Rugrats film trilogy has grossed $299.6 million. In July 2018, Paramount announced that Rugrats would release a live-action movie on January 29, 2021. However, in November 2019, Paramount decided to pull the movie from its schedule with no explanation given. In October 2024, it was announced that a new live-action hybrid film was in the works from Paramount and Jason Moore.

=== Live action film ===
On July 16, 2018, It was announced that Paramount Pictures had greenlit a live-action/CGI hybrid feature film which was last set for a January 29, 2021 release date. Originally, it had been set for a November 13, 2020 release, and then was pushed back, with Clifford the Big Red Dog taking its old slot. But on November 12, 2019, the live-action/CGI hybrid film was removed from Paramount's release schedule replacing it with Paramount Animation's Rumble. In October 2024, it was announced that the film was back on track at Paramount with Jason Moore on board to direct with Mikey Day and Streeter Seidell setting to pen the script.

=== Spin-offs and reboot ===
Rugrats Pre-School Daze, also known as Angelica and Susie's School Daze, is a spin-off that follows Angelica Pickles and Susie Carmichael as preschool students. Arlene Klasky and Gábor Csupó were its creators and executive producers. It was announced in 2001 as the first spin-off for Rugrats, and initially received a 13-episode order. Though it was reportedly a "highly-anticipated" part of the March 2002 upfront presentation, the series was reduced to four television specials. This decision was reached after Nickelodeon shifted its focus to the All Grown Up! spin-off following the rating success of "All Growed Up". Rugrats Pre-School Daze was first shown in the United States between November 2008 and December 2008. The series carried a TV-Y parental rating, meaning that it was judged as "designed to be appropriate for all children".

All four episodes of Rugrats Pre-School Daze were included as bonus episodes on the DVDs for the Rugrats: Tales from the Crib movies. The first two were included on the Snow White DVD, released in 2005, while the last two were on the one for Three Jacks and a Beanstalk, released in 2006. The series was once available on the iTunes Store and Amazon Instant Video, but the episodes were later removed from both platforms. All episodes are available on Hulu. Variety's Brian Steinberg felt that the series' concept could be retooled as part of a Rugrats reboot, where the baby protagonists would be shown in preschool and Angelica in kindergarten. On May 14, 2020, it was announced that the reboot was delayed until 2021. it was announced that Nickelodeon had given a series order to a 26-episode revival of the series, executive produced by Klasky, Csupó, and Germain. The reboot premiered on Paramount+ on May 27, 2021. The reboot also began airing on Nickelodeon on August 20, 2021.

=== Other media ===
==== Comics ====
From 1998 to 2003, Nick produced a Rugrats comic strip, which was distributed through Creators Syndicate. Initially written by show-writer Scott Gray and drawn by comic book artist Steve Crespo, with Rob Armstrong as editor. Will Blyberg came on board shortly after as inker. By the end of 1998, Lee Nordling, who had joined as a contributing gag writer, took over as editor. Nordling hired extra writers, including Gordon Kent, Scott Roberts, Chuck Kim, J. Torres, Marc Bilgrey, and John Zakour, as well as new artists including Gary Fields, Tim Harkins, Vince Giaranno, and Scott Roberts. Stu Chaifetz colored the Sunday strips. The Rugrats strip started out in many papers, but as often happens with spin-off strips, soon slowed down. It is still seen in some papers in re-runs. Two paperback collections were published by Andrews McMeel It's a Jungle-Gym Out There and A Baby's Work Is Never Done.

During this time, Nickelodeon also published 30 issues of an all-Rugrats comic magazine. Most of these were edited by Frank Pittarese and Dave Roman, and featured stories and art by the comic strip creators and others. The last nine issues featured cover art by Scott Roberts, who wrote and drew many of the stories. Other writers included Roman, Chris Duffy, Patrick M. O'Connell, Joyce Mann, and Jim Spivey. Other artists included Joe Staton and Ernie Colón. The magazine also included short stories, many by Pittarese, and games, as well as reprints from an earlier, UK produced Rugrats comic.

Nick produced a special 50-page comic magazine retelling of the film Rugrats in Paris, edited by Pittarese and Roman, written by Scott Gray, pencils by Scott Roberts, and inks by Adam DeKraker.

On October 18, 2017, Boom! Studios began publishing a new Rugrats comic book series.

==== Video games ====
In 1997, THQ signed a licensing agreement with Nickelodeon to produce video games based on Rugrats for home consoles and handhelds, beginning with Rugrats: Search for Reptar (1998). Multiple games were produced as part of this deal, including game adaptations of The Rugrats Movie and Rugrats in Paris: The Movie, games based on the All Grown Up series, and original games like Rugrats: Scavenger Hunt and Rugrats: Totally Angelica. Following the release of Rugrats: Totally Angelica — Boredom Busters in 2005, no new standalone Rugrats games would be released for nearly two decades. On August 31, 2023, The MIX Games and Wallride Games announced Rugrats: Adventures in Gameland, an 8-bit 2D sidescrolling video game that was released on August 16, 2024. The game offers an option for HD visuals that replicates the visual style of the original television series. An NES cartridge version of the game was distributed through Limited Run Games. Limited Run Games would later release a compilation of several THQ games, Rugrats: Retro Rewind Collection, on May 15, 2026.

In addition to Rugrats video games, characters from the series also appear in various Nickelodeon crossover games. Tommy and Angelica appear as guest characters in Rocket Power: Team Rocket Rescue. They appear again as playable characters in Nickelodeon Party Blast and Nicktoons Racing. Tommy later appears in Nicktoons Basketball in his All Grown Up! form. Rugrats characters make non-playable appearances in Nicktoons: Attack of the Toybots and Nicktoons MLB. Tommy, Angelica, and Reptar are playable characters in the official mobile game Nickelodeon Super Brawl Universe. Tommy, Angelica, and Reptar appear as playable characters in Nickelodeon Kart Racers. These same characters, along with Chuckie, are playable in Nickelodeon Kart Racers 2: Grand Prix. Reptar is a playable character in Nickelodeon All-Star Brawl and its sequel. Angelica is a playable character in the Apple Arcade game Nickelodeon Extreme Tennis. Chuckie, Reptar, Purple Reptar, and Susie appear as playable characters in Nickelodeon Kart Racers 3: Slime Speedway.

==== Live performances ====
There are two live performances throughout the original series. The first show, Rugrats: A Live Adventure, premiered on February 6, 1998, at the Oakdale Theater in Wallingford, Connecticut. The US leg of the tour ended on August 1, 1999, at Lawrence Welk Resort Center-Champagne Theatre in Branson, Missouri. Originally, the international tour of the show was going to debut on September 27, 1999, in Mara Plata, Argentina, but it was cancelled along with all shows in South America. It instead had an international debut on October 28, 1999, at the Wembley Stadium in Wembley, Greater London, England. The international tour of the shows were done in the United Kingdom, Ireland, and Australia and ended on May 14, 2000, at the Adelaide Entertainment Centre in Adelaide, South Australia. Overall, the North American tours of the show ran 403 shows in 91 cities, and the international tour of the show ran in 12 cities. Despite some criticism, the show was well received from critics.

The second show, Rugrats Magic Adventure!, premiered on June 9, 2000. It ran exclusively at Universal Studios Hollywood in Los Angeles, California. It closed in 2001, and was replaced by Shrek 4-D in 2003.

==== Merchandise ====
Merchandise that was based on Rugrats varied from video games, toothpaste, Kellogg's cereal, slippers, puzzles, pajamas, jewelry, wrapping paper, Fruit Snacks, Inflatable balls, watches, pencils, markers, cookie jars, key rings, action figures, My First Uno games, and bubblegum. The series also managed to spawn a popular merchandise line at Walmart, Kmart, Target, eBay, Hot Topic, J. C. Penney, Toys "R" Us, Mattel, Barnes & Noble, and Basic Fun. By March 1999, the franchise had generated an estimated $1.4 billion in merchandise sales.

The Rugrats had their own cereal made by Post called Reptar Crunch Cereal. The Rugrats and Reptar were predominantly featured on the front, there's a board game on the back and a special $3 rebate for Runaway Reptar on the side. This cereal was released for a limited time only, sold at US supermarkets 8/1/99 to 9/15/99 only, and not all supermarkets carried the cereal. To memorialize the movie, Rugrats in Paris, another Rugrats-based cereal came out in October 2000. Simply called the Rugrats in Paris Cereal, it has a similar appearance to Trix; it's a sweetened, multi-grain cereal with small-round bits in plain, red, purple and green. Small Eiffel Towers could also be seen. In 2017, entertainment retail store chain FYE began selling Reptar Cereal, as well as Reptar Bars, both based on fictional products within the series. Reptar Cereal is very similar to Froot Loops, and Reptar Bars are chocolate bars filled with green frosting, a reference to the series in which the bars would turn the tongues of whoever ate it green.

Rugrats made fast-food appearances as well, with the most appearances being on Burger King. In 1994, the Hardee's fast-food chain offered a collection of Nicktoons toys as premiums that were included with kids' meals at their restaurants. All four Nicktoons at that time were featured — Doug, Rugrats, Ren & Stimpy, and Rocko's Modern Life. Other food items that feature Rugrats were Fruit Snacks, Macaroni and Cheese, Bubble Gum and Campbell's Rugrats Pasta with Chicken and Broth.

In their first tie-in with Burger King, five Rugrats toys were offered with their Kids Club meals, a different one with each meal. Each toy came with a 12-page (including covers) miniature version of Nickelodeon Magazine, which featured the toy's instructions, word search, picture puzzle, "Say What?", a scrambled word puzzle, a coupon for Oral-B Rugrats toothpaste and toothbrush, and entry blanks to subscribe to Rugrats Comic Adventures, Nick Magazine, and the Kids Club. From 1998 until 2004, Rugrats based-products included watches and various toys.
