= Arlene Klasky =

American animator (born 1949)

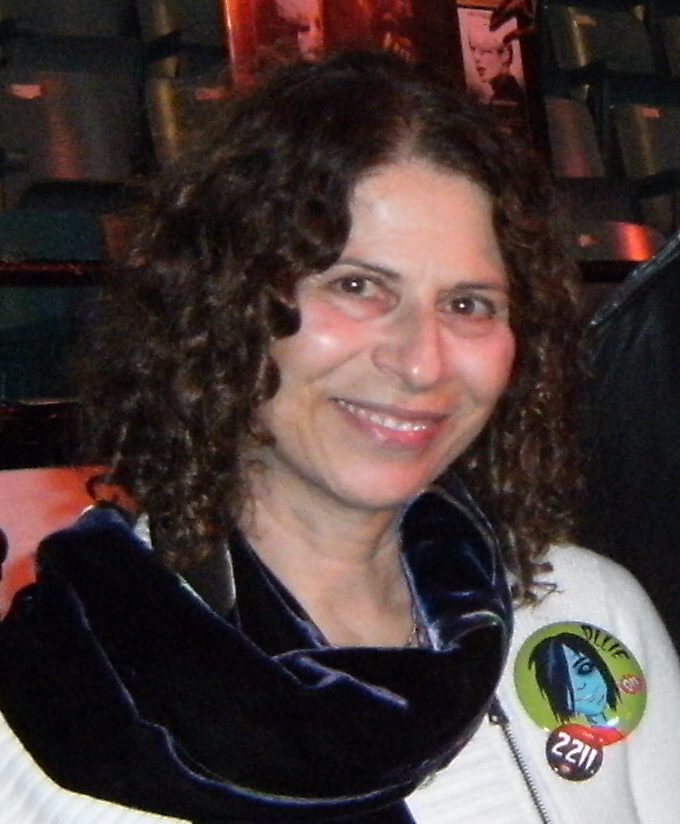
- Klasky in 2011
- Born: Arlene Phyllis Klasky; May 26, 1949 (age 77); Omaha, Nebraska, U.S.
- Occupations: Animator; graphic designer; producer
- Spouse: Gábor Csupó (m. 1979; div. 1995)
- Children: 2
- Website: www.klaskycsupo.com

Arlene Phyllis Klasky (born May 26, 1949) is an American animator, graphic designer, and film producer. She is the co-founder of Klasky Csupo with Gábor Csupó. She was also named one of the "Top 25 Women in Animation" by Animation Magazine in 1999. Klasky is most known for her work with Nickelodeon in the 1990s and 2000s, as she co-created the animated series Rugrats, as well as the 2021 revival series of the same name.

== Career ==
=== Klasky Csupo ===
Klasky Csupo was formed with Gábor Csupó in the couple's two-bedroom Hollywood apartment in 1980. The company was later moved to Seward Street in Hollywood. They designed the logos for 21 Jump Street, Anything but Love and In Living Color; produced music videos for Beastie Boys and Luther Vandross; Simpsons shorts for The Tracey Ullman Show; shorts for Sesame Street; and the opening titles for In Living Color.

In 1989, after the birth of Klasky and Csupo's two sons, Klasky Csupo was asked by Nickelodeon for ideas, but Klasky felt she didn't have any since she mainly watched her sons go to the bathroom. Rugrats was inspired by the boys and what they would say if they could talk. The series started in August 1991 with the unaired pilot "Tommy Pickles and the Great White Thing". Rugrats went on to become one of Nickelodeon's most iconic and successful television series, winning three Emmy Awards. Klasky was the creative force behind the box-office hits The Rugrats Movie and Rugrats in Paris: The Movie.

Aaahh!!! Real Monsters premiered on Halloween in 1994, their second cartoon show to be aired on Nickelodeon. In 2003, she created All Grown Up!, the sequel to Rugrats; in the United States, it aired on Nickelodeon from 2003 to 2008, and has since aired reruns on TeenNick and Nicktoons.

Arlene and Gabor created the Rocket Power television series. It was inspired by watching their own kids get involved with extreme sports.

== Personal life ==
Klasky grew up in Orange County, California and is very familiar with the sport of surfing, which helped serve as creative inspiration for her television series, Rocket Power.

She was married to her business partner Gábor Csupó before they started their animation company; they have two sons together from their marriage. Tommy Pickles' appearance from Rugrats is based on their younger son, Brandon. Their older son, Jarrett Csupó, died in 2018 from liver cancer at the age of 33.

Klasky is of Polish-Jewish and Russian-Jewish descent.
