= Joe Alaskey =

American actor (1952–2016)

- Born: Joseph Francis Alaskey III; April 17, 1952; Troy, New York, U.S.
- Died: February 3, 2016 (aged 63); Green Island, New York, U.S.
- Occupations: Actor; comedian
- Years active: 1975–2016
- Website: joealaskey.com (archived)

Joseph Francis Alaskey III (April 17, 1952 – February 3, 2016) was an American actor and comedian. He was one of Mel Blanc's successors at the Warner Bros. Animation studio until his death. He alternated with Jeff Bergman, Greg Burson, Jim Cummings, Bob Bergen, Maurice LaMarche, Billy West and Eric Bauza in voicing Warner Bros. cartoon characters such as Bugs Bunny, Daffy Duck, Porky Pig, Sylvester, Tweety, Elmer Fudd, Yosemite Sam, Foghorn Leghorn, Pepé Le Pew, Marvin the Martian, Speedy Gonzales, Taz, Wile E. Coyote and the Road Runner, among many others. He also voiced Plucky Duck on Tiny Toon Adventures from 1990 to 1995. Alaskey was the second actor to voice Grandpa Lou Pickles on Nickelodeon's Rugrats (taking over after David Doyle's death in 1997). He would later reprise his role in the spin-off series All Grown Up!. In 2004, he won a Daytime Emmy Award for voicing the title role in the animated series Duck Dodgers.

== Early life ==
Joseph Francis Alaskey III was born in Troy, New York, on April 17, 1952, to Joseph Francis Alaskey Jr. and Domenica "Dorothy" De Sorrento De Luca Alaskey. At age three, he was looking for a pair of sunglasses or people's cigar butts so that he could portray different characters. Alaskey was interested in archaeology at the age of ten. After archeology, he was interested in becoming a priest and an English teacher. Alaskey moved to New York City in the 1970s, where he worked in insurance while preparing to become an actor.

== Career ==
After moving to New York City, Alaskey began his show business career as a stand-up comedian and broadcaster. Although best known for his ability to successfully impersonate Looney Tunes characters, Alaskey did voice work for non-Warner Bros. characters as well. His voice career in animation began when he was discovered by Bill Scott, the voice of Bullwinkle J. Moose, who recruited him to voice Boris Badenov in TV commercials. From 1985 to 1986, he performed various voices for the syndicated animated series Galtar and the Golden Lance.

In 1981, Alaskey had been approached by animator Friz Freleng to be a potential successor to Mel Blanc. His first major voice work for film was in Who Framed Roger Rabbit (1988), where he voiced Yosemite Sam. While veteran voice actor Blanc voiced several characters in the film, he declined to reprise his role as Yosemite Sam, fearing it would damage his throat, and Alaskey was chosen to replace him. Alaskey eventually assumed the roles of Bugs Bunny and Daffy Duck following Blanc's death in 1989.

Alaskey was occasionally seen onscreen impersonating Jackie Gleason, with whom he shared a physical resemblance. In the 1980s, Gleason personally chose Alaskey to re-record selected dialogue from the "lost episodes" of The Honeymooners found in Gleason's private collection. After Gleason died in 1987, the project was shelved.

Alaskey appeared on several television shows, including Night Court, Head of the Class, and The Drew Carey Show. From 1987 to 1991, Alaskey was a regular on the sitcom Out of This World as Evie's uncle Beano Froelich. Alaskey's only leading role in a live-action film was as Ron Douglas in the black comedy Lucky Stiff (1988), directed by Anthony Perkins and co-starring Donna Dixon and Jeff Kober.

In 1989, Alaskey was the original announcer on the short-lived game show Couch Potatoes, hosted by Marc Summers. Alaskey made several onscreen appearances, portraying the show's "next door neighbor". For the show's final weeks, he was replaced by Jim McKrell and the "next door neighbor" concept was dropped. During this time, he was also a panelist on The New Hollywood Squares, hosted by John Davidson.

Alaskey was the primary voice for Plucky Duck on Tiny Toon Adventures. He voiced Stinkie the Ghost in Casper (1995), as well as the film's 1996 animated spin-off, The Spooktacular New Adventures of Casper. He inherited the role of Grandpa Lou Pickles on Rugrats after voice actor David Doyle's death in 1997. He voiced Lou again in the Rugrats spin-off series, All Grown Up!. He also created the voice of Thomas Timberwolf for the internet series TimberWolf, created by animation legend Chuck Jones. He was heard briefly as a voice-over announcer for the Toon Disney channel (and sometimes Dcom extras on Disney Channel).

In 2003, he provided the voices for Bugs Bunny and Daffy Duck in the film Looney Tunes: Back in Action. He voiced Daffy in the Cartoon Network series Duck Dodgers, for which he won a Daytime Emmy Award in 2004. He also, at times, provided the voices for Sylvester, Tweety, and other Looney Tunes characters.

Alaskey also did voice work for video games. He was the voice of Lizard in the game Spider-Man 2 (2004) and Doctor Octopus in Spider-Man: Friend or Foe (2007). He voiced Mermaid Man in the games SpongeBob SquarePants: Lights, Camera, Pants! (2005) and SpongeBob SquarePants: Creature from the Krusty Krab (2006).

In 2008, Alaskey participated in a unique interview conducted by Logan Leistikow and released by TheYellowMic.com. He answered questions and told his story, then went out onto Hollywood Boulevard and talked to people on the street who wanted to hear his famous voices. This was the first time Alaskey had performed in public in this manner.

From 2014 until his death, Alaskey was the narrator for the Investigation Discovery Network television documentary series Murder Comes to Town.

== Death ==
Alaskey died of cancer on February 3, 2016, at age 63, in his apartment in Green Island, New York, with his brother by his side. Five days later, his funeral was held at St Patrick's Cemetery in Watervliet, New York.

== Filmography ==
=== Film ===
List of voice performances in feature and direct-to-video films
Year	Title	Role	Notes
1988	Who Framed Roger Rabbit	Yosemite Sam	
1990	Spaced Invaders	Doctor Ziplock	
1990	The Jungle Book	Kaa	
1991	Bugs Bunny's Lunar Tunes	Daffy Duck, Marvin the Martian	Direct-to-video
1991	A Wish for Wings That Work	Truffles, The Ducks	
1992	Tiny Toon Adventures: How I Spent My Vacation	Plucky Duck, Elmer Fudd, Tupelo Toad, Johnny Carson, Ed McMahon	Direct-to-video
1995	Casper	Stinkie	
1995	Carrotblanca	Daffy Duck, Sylvester	Short
1995	Another Froggy Evening	Marvin the Martian	Short
1996	Marvin the Martian in the Third Dimension	Duck Dodgers, K-9, Martian Commander	Short
1997	The World of Bears with Bugs Bunny	Daffy Duck, Sylvester, Speedy Gonzales	Direct-to-video
1997	Bugs Bunny's Funky Monkeys	Daffy Duck, Sylvester	Direct-to-video
1997	Bugs Bunny's Elephant Parade	Daffy Duck, Sylvester	Direct-to-video
1997	Father of the Bird	Sylvester	Short
1998	Bugs Bunny's Silly Seals	Daffy Duck, Sylvester, Slowpoke Rodriguez	Direct-to-video
1998	Looney Tunes Sing-Alongs	Daffy Duck, Tweety	Direct-to-video
1998	Quest for Camelot Sing-Alongs	Daffy Duck, Tweety	Direct-to-video
1998	The Rugrats Movie	Grandpa Lou Pickles	
2000	Tweety's High Flying Adventure	Bugs Bunny, Sylvester, Tweety, Daffy Duck, Pepé Le Pew, Marvin the Martian, Henery Hawk, Colonel Rimfire	Direct-to-video
2000	Rugrats in Paris: The Movie	Grandpa Lou Pickles	
2001	Scooby-Doo and the Cyber Chase	Officer Wembley	Direct-to-video
2002	Balto II: Wolf Quest	Hunter, Nuk	Direct-to-video
2003	Rugrats Go Wild	Grandpa Lou Pickles	
2003	Looney Tunes: Stranger Than Fiction	Daffy Duck, Sylvester, Sylvester Jr., Tweety, Marvin the Martian	Direct-to-video
2003	Looney Tunes: Reality Check	Daffy Duck, Sylvester, Tweety, Wile E. Coyote, Cecil Turtle, Beaky Buzzard	Direct-to-video
2003	Looney Tunes: Back in Action	Bugs Bunny, Daffy Duck, Sylvester, Beaky Buzzard, Mama Bear	Nominated - Annie Award for Voice Acting in a Feature Production
2004	Hare and Loathing in Las Vegas	Bugs Bunny	Short
2004	Daffy Duck for President	Bugs Bunny, Daffy Duck	Short
2006	The Legend of Sasquatch	Dave	
2006	Bah, Humduck! A Looney Tunes Christmas	Daffy Duck, Sylvester, Marvin the Martian, Foghorn Leghorn, Pepé Le Pew	Direct-to-video
2007	Elf Bowling the Movie: The Great North Pole Elf Strike	Santa Claus, Bagger, Chief Manamana	
2008	Justice League: The New Frontier	Bugs Bunny	Direct-to-video
2009	The Haunted World of El Superbeasto	Erik the Newscaster, Van Sloan	Direct-to-video
2011	Tom and Jerry and the Wizard of Oz	The Wizard of Oz, Butch, Droopy Dog	Direct-to-video
2012	Tom and Jerry: Robin Hood and His Merry Mouse	Friar Tuck, Droopy Dog	Direct-to-video
2013	Tom and Jerry's Giant Adventure	Droopy Dog, King Droopy	Direct-to-video
2015	Tom and Jerry: Spy Quest	Droopy Dog	Direct-to-video
2016	Tom and Jerry: Back to Oz	The Wizard of Oz, Butch, Droopy Dog	Posthumous release Direct-to-video (final film role), dedicated in memory.

=== Television ===
List of voice performances in television shows
Year	Title	Role	Notes
1988	Mighty Mouse: The New Adventures	Sourpuss	6 episodes
1990–1992	Tiny Toon Adventures	Plucky Duck, Daffy Duck, Porky Pig, Sylvester, Yosemite Sam, Marvin the Martian, Speedy Gonzales, Wile E. Coyote, Roger Rabbit, Hugo the Abominable Snowman, Additional voices	Main role 85 episodes
1991	Back to the Future	The Sheriff	2 episodes
1991	Where's Waldo?	Additional voices	13 episodes
1991	Tom & Jerry Kids	Mouse Scarlet	Episode: "Jerry Hood and His Merry Meeces/Eradicator Droopy/Tyke on a Hike"
1992	The Little Mermaid	Lobster Mobster	3 episodes
1992	The Plucky Duck Show	Plucky Duck, Plucky's Dad, and Wade Pig	Main role 13 episodes
1993	Bonkers	Flaps the Elephant, Arnie and Silas Stork	4 episodes
1994–1996	Duckman	Dream Sequence Criminal	3 episodes
1995–2002	The Sylvester & Tweety Mysteries	Sylvester, Tweety, Daffy Duck, and Marvin the Martian	52 episodes
1995	The Baby Huey Show	Baby Huey	Season 2
1996	Life with Louie	Johnny Love	Episode: "A Fair to Remember"
1996–1998	The Spooktacular New Adventures of Casper	Stinkie and Gorey Narrator	Recurring role 52 Episodes
1997	Extreme Ghostbusters	Sturt	3 episodes
1997–2004	Rugrats	Grandpa Lou Pickles, Additional voices	49 episodes
1998	The Drew Carey Show	Daffy Duck	Episode: "My Best Friend's Wedding"
1999	Timon & Pumbaa	Little Jimmy	2 episodes
1999	Hey Arnold!	German Major and Soldier #2	Episode: "Veterans Day"
1999	Men in Black: The Series	Short Bug and Truck Driver	Episode: "The Mine, Mine, Mine Syndrome"
2000	Buzz Lightyear of Star Command	Soda Vendbot and Newspaper Vendbot	Episode: "The Slayer"
2001	Johnny Bravo	Jean Paul, Piney, and Platypus	Episode: "Lumberjack Johnny"
2001	Time Squad	Robin Hood, Wilbur Wright, Samuel F. B. Morse	Episode: "If It's Wright, It's Wrong/Recruitment Ad/Killing Time"
2001	Samurai Jack	General and Alien #3	Episode: "Episode VII"
2003	Teamo Supremo	Chief	Episode: "The Chief of Cheer"
2003	Harvey Birdman, Attorney at Law	Peter Potamus, FEAR #1, and Employee	2 episodes
2003–2005	Duck Dodgers	Captain Duck Edgar Dumas Aloysius Dodgers, Additional voices	Main role, 39 episodes
2003	My Life as a Teenage Robot	Ivan, Storeowner #3, and Eyedrop Salesman	Episode: "See No Evil"
2003–2008	All Grown Up!	Grandpa Lou Pickles and Rustler #2	15 episodes
2006–2007	Avatar: The Last Airbender	Dealer and Broadsword Man	2 episodes
2006	Codename: Kids Next Door	Principal Smelling	Episode: "Operation R.E.C.E.S.S."
2006–2007	Loonatics Unleashed	Sylth Vester, The Royal Tweetums, Melvin the Martian and Stoney the Stone	5 episodes
2008–2013	The Garfield Show	Additional voices	
2009	Looney Tunes: Laff Riot	Bugs Bunny, Daffy Duck	Unaired pilot for The Looney Tunes Show Replaced by Jeff Bergman

=== Video games ===
List of voice performances in video games
Year	Title	Role	Notes
1994	Sylvester and Tweety in Cagey Capers	Sylvester	
1995	Daffy Duck in Hollywood	Daffy Duck	Sega Genesis version
1996	Tiny Toon Adventures: Buster and the Beanstalk	Plucky Duck	Credited as Joe Alasky
1997	Dilbert's Desktop Games	Phil The Prince of Insufficient Light, Accounting Troll	
1997	The X-Fools		
1998	Microshaft Winblows 98	Additional voices	
1998	Rugrats Adventure Game	Grandpa Lou Pickles	
1998	Rugrats: Search for Reptar	Grandpa Lou Pickles	
1998	Tiny Toon Adventures: The Great Beanstalk	Plucky Duck	Uncredited
1998	The Rugrats Movie: Activity Challenge	Rex Pester	
1999	Bugs Bunny: Lost in Time	Marvin the Martian, Rocky and Mugsy	
1999	Star Wars: Episode I – The Phantom Menace	Important Merchant, Interpreter, Watto's Flunky	
1999	Tiny Toon Adventures: Toonenstein	Plucky Duck	
1999	Rugrats: Studio Tour	Grandpa Lou Pickles	
2000	Vampire: The Masquerade – Redemption		
2000	Duck Dodgers Starring Daffy Duck	Daffy Duck, Marvin the Martian, Dr. I.Q. Hi	
2000	Escape from Monkey Island	Digg the Lucre Lawyer, Judge Edd	
2000	Looney Tunes Racing	Daffy Duck, Sylvester, Gossamer, Rocky, Marvin the Martian, Tweety, Smokey the Genie, Evil Scientist	
2000	Looney Tunes Space Race	Daffy Duck, Sylvester the Cat, Marvin the Martian, Tweety Bird	
2000	Bugs Bunny & Taz: Time Busters	Count Blood Count, Daffy Duck, Tweety, Bubba Chop	
2001	Sheep, Dog 'n' Wolf	Daffy Duck, Marvin the Martian, Gossamer, Phantom	
2002	Rugrats: Royal Ransom	Grandpa Lou Pickles	
2002	Loons: The Fight for Fame	Daffy Duck, Sylvester, Rocky and Mugsy	
2002	Taz: Wanted	Daffy Duck, Tweety	
2002	Hot Wheels Velocity X	Rupert, Backroads, Opponent	
2002	Tiny Toon Adventures: Defenders of the Universe	Plucky Duck	Cancelled Game
2003	Looney Tunes: Back in Action	Bugs Bunny, Daffy Duck, Mr. ACME Chairman, Sylvester, Marvin the Martian	
2004	Spider-Man 2	Dr. Connors, Thug	
2004	The Dukes of Hazzard: Return of the General Lee		
2005	Fantastic Four	Additional voices	Credited as Joe Alasky
2005	SpongeBob SquarePants: Lights, Camera, Pants!	Mermaid Man	
2006	Gothic 3		English Dub
2006	SpongeBob SquarePants: Creature from the Krusty Krab	Mermaid Man	
2006	The Sopranos: Road to Respect		
2006	Superman Returns	The Citizens of Metropolis	
2007	Spider-Man: Friend or Foe	Otto Octavius / Doctor Octopus	
2007	Looney Tunes: Duck Amuck	Daffy Duck	
2007	Looney Tunes: Acme Arsenal	Bugs Bunny, Daffy Duck, Sylvester, Marvin the Martian	
2008	Looney Tunes: Cartoon Conductor	Bugs Bunny, Daffy Duck, Barnyard Dawg, Marvin the Martian, Road Runner, Speedy Gonzales, Sylvester	
2008	White Knight Chronicles	Drisdall	English Dub
2011	Looney Tunes Click 'N READ Phonics	Bugs Bunny, Daffy Duck, Yosemite Sam, Sylvester, Tweety, Tasmanian Devil	
2014	Lego Batman 3: Beyond Gotham	Green Loontern	

=== Live-action ===
List of acting performances in television and feature films
Year	Title	Role	Notes
1986	Night Court	Thomas Dobbs	Episode: "Author, Author"
1987	Head of the Class	Jack	Episode: "Ode to Simone"
1987–1988	Super Password	Himself	10 episodes
1987–1991	Out of this World	Beano Froelich	68 episodes
1988	Lucky Stiff	Ron Douglas	
1989	Couch Potatoes	Himself, The Neighbor	9 episodes
1992	Nurses	Trekker #1	Episode: "Eat Something"
1992	The Golden Palace	Mr. Smith #3	Episode: "Camp Town Races Aren't Nearly as Much Fun as They Used to Be"
1993	Bank Robber	Night Clerk #2	
1993	The Waiter	Producer	Short
1994	Forrest Gump	President Richard Nixon (voice)	
2015	Murder Comes to Town	Narrator (voice)	Investigation Discovery; Episode: "Cowboys from Hell"
2015	Dark Seduction	Fatman	

=== Theme parks ===
List of voice performances in theme park attractions
Year	Title	Role	Notes
1991	Looney Tunes River Ride	Daffy Duck, Sylvester, Speedy Gonzales	
1992	Yosemite Sam and the Gold River Adventure!	Daffy Duck, Sylvester, Speedy Gonzales	
1993	The Toonite Show Starring Bugs Bunny	Daffy Duck, Foghorn Leghorn	
1995	The Bugs Bunny Wacky World Games	Daffy Duck	
1999	Looney Tunes: What's Up, Rock?	Daffy Duck, Sylvester	
2000	The Looney Tunes Rockin' Road Show	Daffy Duck, Sylvester	
2010	Looney Tunes Dance Off	Bugs Bunny, Daffy Duck, Sylvester, Tweety Bird	

=== Web series ===
List of voice performances in web series
Year	Title	Role	Notes
2001	Timber Wolf	Thomas Timber Wolf	

Preceded by Jeff Bergman (1990–1993; 2011–present)	Voice of Daffy Duck; 1990–2014	Succeeded by Maurice LaMarche
Preceded by David Doyle	Voice of Grandpa Lou Pickles; 1998–2008	Succeeded by Michael McKean
Preceded by Billy West	Voice of Bugs Bunny; 2000–2011	Succeeded by Jeff Bergman
Preceded by Jeff Bergman	Voice of Droopy Dog; 2011–2016	Succeeded by Jeff Bergman
