= Jack Riley (actor) =

American actor (1935–2016)

- Riley in 2005
- Born: John Albert Riley Jr. December 30, 1935; Cleveland, Ohio, U.S.
- Died: August 19, 2016 (aged 80); Los Angeles, California, U.S.
- Occupations: Actor; comedian; writer
- Years active: 1953–2013
- Spouse: Ginger Lawrence Riley (m. 1970)
- Children: 2

John Albert Riley Jr. (December 30, 1935 – August 19, 2016) was an American actor, comedian and writer, best known for his comedic roles. He is known for playing Elliot Carlin, a chronic psychology client of Bob Newhart's character on The Bob Newhart Show, and for voicing Stu Pickles, one of the parents in the animated Rugrats franchise.

== Early life ==
Riley was born in Cleveland, Ohio, the son of Agnes C. Riley (née Corrigan) and John Albert Riley. After attending Saint Ignatius High School and John Carroll University, he served in the U.S. Army.

After being discharged, Riley became a popular radio personality in Cleveland, along with his radio partner and straight man Jeff Baxter; The Baxter & Riley Show on WERE (1300 AM) featured not only music but comedy sketches and a slew of offbeat characters that Riley and Baxter voiced. Riley gave up the radio show in the mid-1960s and moved to Los Angeles, where his Cleveland friend Tim Conway helped him obtain work writing comedy sketches, which later led to acting opportunities.

== Career ==
First a semi-regular in the cast of the 1960s sitcom Occasional Wife, a short-lived show on NBC in which he played Wally Frick, Riley was perhaps most famous for playing Elliot Carlin, the neurotic, sour, and selfish patient on The Bob Newhart Show 1972–1978. In 1973, he was cast as Gomez Addams in The Addams Family Fun-House, then in 1979, he starred in ABC's holiday telefilm The Halloween That Almost Wasn't (also known as The Night Dracula Saved The World) as Warren the Werewolf of Budapest.

In 1980, Riley appeared in a comedy special for HBO called The Wild Wacky Wonderful World of Winter. He was a regular cast member in The Tim Conway Show, a comedy-variety show that aired on CBS from March 1980 through late summer 1981, acting in sketch comedy in each episode. In 1985, he reprised his Bob Newhart Show role of Elliot Carlin on St. Elsewhere, and did so again in a 1987 episode of ALF.

Among his other TV credits are multiple appearances on such shows as Rowan & Martin's Laugh-In (parodying Lyndon Johnson), M*A*S*H, Barney Miller, Hogan's Heroes, The Mary Tyler Moore Show, One Day at a Time, Gomer Pyle, Diff'rent Strokes, and Night Court. He was also a favorite of Mel Brooks, appearing in several of his films: High Anxiety (1977), History of the World: Part I (1981), To Be or Not to Be (1983), and in a role in Spaceballs (1987).

Riley often provided voiceovers for television and radio commercials, most notably in spots for Country Crock margarine. He also voiced the character "P.C. Modem, the computer genius" in radio commercials for CompUSA that aired in the 1990s. In the 1990s and early 2000s, Riley was known for voicing Stu Pickles (father of the main protagonist Tommy) in the animated series Rugrats. The franchise consisted of the TV series, the spin-off All Grown Up! and the film trilogy.

He continued to make guest appearances during the 1990s in popular sitcoms, showing up in episodes of Seinfeld, Son of the Beach, Friends, Coach, The Drew Carey Show, That '70s Show, and, in a gag appearance, as an unnamed but obvious Mr. Carlin in a 1988 episode of Newhart. He made a cameo appearance on the November 23, 2013, episode of Saturday Night Live, as a subway passenger during the sketch "Matchbox 3".

== Personal life and death ==
Riley married Ginger Lawrence on January 3, 1970, and they had two children.

Riley died of pneumonia on August 19, 2016, at the age of 80.

== Filmography ==
=== Film ===
Year	Title	Role	Notes
1962	Days of Wine and Roses	Waiter	Uncredited
1970	Catch-22	Doctor	
1971	McCabe & Mrs. Miller	Riley Quinn	
1971	In Broad Daylight	Cab Driver #3	TV movie (uncredited)
1971	The Todd Killings	Record Company Executive	
1973	The Thief Who Came to Dinner	Lab Technician	Uncredited
1973	The Long Goodbye	Riley	
1974	Bank Shot	Jackson	
1974	California Split	Second Bartender	
1976	Silent Movie	Executive	
1977	Bumpers	Murphy	TV movie
1977	The World's Greatest Lover	Projectionist	
1977	High Anxiety	The Desk Clerk	
1978	Attack of the Killer Tomatoes!	Salesman	
1978	Christmas Eve on Sesame Street	Citizen	TV movie (uncredited)
1979	Mother and Me, M.D.	Evan Murray	TV movie
1979	Butch and Sundance: The Early Days	Messenger	
1979	The Halloween That Almost Wasn't	The Werewolf	TV movie
1980	Marriage Is Alive and Well	Owen	TV movie
1980	The Wild Wacky Wonderful World of Winter	Store clerk	TV movie
1981	History of the World: Part I	Stoned Soldier #2	
1982	The Rules of Marriage	Herb Gallup	TV movie
1982	All Night Radio	Mr. Worthington	TV movie
1982	Frances	Bob Barnes	
1983	When Your Lover Leaves	Ralph	TV movie
1983	To Be or Not to Be	Dobish	
1984	Finders Keepers	Ormond	
1984	Night Patrol	Doctor Ziegler	
1985	Lots of Luck	Marvin	TV movie
1985	Brothers-in-Law	Freeman	TV movie
1985	The History of White People in America	Scientist	TV movie
1986	The Christmas Toy	Dad	TV movie (uncredited)
1986	The History of White People in America: Volume II	Scientist	TV movie
1987	Spaceballs	TV Newsman	
1988	Rented Lips	Herb the Auditor	
1988	Portrait of a White Marriage	Roy Bloomer	
1989	Gleaming the Cube	Homeowner	
1989	C.H.U.D. II: Bud the C.H.U.D.	Wade Williams	
1990	Payback	Coroner	
1992	The Player	Himself	
1993	A Dangerous Woman	Bandleader	
1993	Sesame Street Stays Up Late!	Jack	TV movie (uncredited)
1995	Theodore Rex	Alaric	
1997	Boogie Nights	Lawyer	
1997	Venus Envy	Mr. Wood	
1998	Chairman of the Board	Condom Boss	
1998	The Rugrats Movie	Stu Pickles	
2000	Rugrats in Paris: The Movie	Stu Pickles	
2000	Rugrats: Acorn Nuts & Diapey Butts	Stu Pickles	TV movie
2001	Recess: School's Out	Golfer #1	
2001	The Rugrats: All Growed Up	Stu Pickles	TV movie
2003	Rugrats Go Wild!	Stu Pickles	
2005	McBride: The Doctor Is Out... Really Out	Alex	TV movie
2006	Room 6	James Brewster	
2007	Avenging Angel	Elder	TV movie

=== Television ===
Year	Title	Role	Notes
1966–67	Occasional Wife	Wally Frick	7 episodes
1967	Gomer Pyle: U.S.M.C.	Larry	2 episodes
1967	The Flying Nun	Leo	Episode: "Ah Love, Could You and I Conspire?"
1968	I Dream of Jeannie	Frank	Episode: "Abdullah"
1968–69	Rowan & Martin's Laugh-In	Himself	5 episodes
1969–70	Hogan's Heroes	Additional Characters	3 episodes
1970	Bracken's World	Mr. Jeffrey	Episode: "Whatever Happened to Happy Endings?"
1970	Pat Paulsen's Half a Comedy Hour	Himself	Uncredited
1970	Love, American Style	Danny	
1970	The Partridge Family	Corporal Wrzesinski	Episode: "See Here, Private Partridge"
1970–71	The Red Skelton Hour	Additional Characters	4 episodes
1971	The Good Life	Cosgrove	Episode: "One of Our Rolls Is Missing"
1971–72	The Mary Tyler Moore Show	Barry Barlow / Eldon Colfax	2 episodes
1972	Getting Together	Mel	Episode: "Breaking Up Is Hard to Do"
1972	M*A*S*H	Capt. Kaplan	Episode: "Chief Surgeon Who?"
1972–78	The Bob Newhart Show	Elliot Carlin	Main cast
1973	Cannon	Programmer	Episode: "Catch Me If You Can"
1973	Columbo	Director	Episode: "Candidate for Crime"
1973	The Girl with Something Extra	Arthur	Episode: "A Meeting of Minds"
1974	Kung Fu	Royal	Episode: "The Gunman"
1974	The Snoop Sisters	Ollie Robertson	Episode: "Fear Is a Free-Throw"
1974	Happy Days	Officer O'Reilly	Episode: "The Deadly Dares"
1974	Police Woman	Joe	Episode: "Anatomy of Two Rapes"
1974	The ABC Afternoon Playbreak	Braddock	Episode: "Can I Save My Children?"
1975	Barnaby Jones	Norm Ricks	Episode: "Poisoned Pigeon"
1975	Harry O	Barney Hamilton / Eddie Stern	2 episodes
1976	Good Heavens		Episode: "Mr. Right"
1976	Alice	Richard Atkins	Episode: "A Call to Arms"
1976–79	Barney Miller	Robert Lovell / Frederick Clooney	2 episodes
1977	The Rockford Files	Adrian Lyman	Episode: "There's One in Every Port"
1978–85	Diff'rent Strokes	Pete / Mr. Crocker / Charles Sutton / Miles Monroe	4 episodes
1979	Joe & Valerie	Ed	Episode: "The Wedding Guest"
1980	The Tim Conway Show	Himself	Episode: "The Night That Dracula Saved The World"
1980	Too Close for Comfort	The Hold-Up Man	Episode: "Who's Afraid of the Big Bad Wolfe?"
1980	Hart to Hart	Norman Culp	Episode: "'Tis the Season to Be Murdered"
1981	Eight Is Enough	Joe Roth	Episode: "Bradfordgate"
1981	Ladies' Man	Dunlap	Episode: "Women Need Not Apply"
1981	Fantasy Island	Henley	Episode: "Night in the Harem/Druids"
1982	Simon & Simon	Dr. Robert P. Medlow	Episode: "Ashes to Ashes, and None Too Soon"
1982	Love, Sidney	Tom	Episode: "Patti, the Torch"
1982	Family Ties	Earl Quigley	Episode: "Have Gun, Will Unravel"
1983	Romance Theatre	Alex	5 episodes
1983	9 to 5	Seymour	Episode: "The Oldest Profession"
1983	Condo	Hughes	Episode: "Members Only"
1983–84	One Day at a Time	Mr. Gonagin	2 episodes
1984	Domestic Life	Deep Throat	Episode: "The Candidates"
1984	Faerie Tale Theatre	Sexton / Deacon	Episode: "The Boy Who Left Home to Find Out About the Shivers"
1984	The Love Boat	Miles Metcalf	3 episodes
1984	Down to Earth	Phil	Episode: "Gone with the Wind"
1984–91	Night Court	Beepo the Clown / Dr. Flick / Jim Wimberly / Warren Wilson / Emil Dutton	7 episodes
1985	Riptide	Tiny Tommy	Episode: "Curse of the Mary Aberdeen"
1985	ABC Afterschool Specials	Mr. White	Episode: "First the Egg"
1985	Silver Spoons	Mr. Snodgrass	Episode: "All the Principal's Men"
1985	Washingtoon		Episode: "Episode #1.1"
1985	St. Elsewhere	Elliot Carlin	Episode: "Close Encounters"
1986	Gimme a Break!	Jack	2 episodes
1986	Blacke's Magic		Episode: "It's a Jungle Out There"
1987	What a Country!	Agent Warren Yates	Episode: "The Road from Morocco"
1987	ALF	Elliot Carlin	Episode: "Going Out of My Head Over You" (uncredited)
1987	Throb	Flashback Johnny / Herb	2 episodes
1987	Roxie	Leon Buchanan	Main cast
1988	Punky Brewster	Snipes	Episode: "Brandon's Commercial"
1988	Charles in Charge	Professor Kleeman	Episode: "Trading Papers"
1988	Mathnet	Mr. Dwight Ledbetter	Episode: "The Case of the Deceptive Data"
1988	Square One Television	Mr. Dwight Ledbetter	Episode: "Episode #2.14"
1988	Newhart	Patient	Episode: "I Married Dick"
1989	Duet	Fredrick	Episode: "Roll Call"
1989	Hard Time on Planet Earth		Episode: "Death Do Us Part"
1989	A Fine Romance	Ray Ragalito	Episode: "Th-Th-Th-That's All Folks"
1990	My Two Dads	Dave	Episode: "It's My Art, and I'll Die If I Want To"
1990	Garfield and Friends	Tyrone	3 episodes
1991	Babes	Jack	Episode: "Not Married with Children"
1991	Harry and the Hendersons	Leonard	Episode: "Working Stiffs"
1991–2004	Rugrats	Stu Pickles / Various Characters	Main Cast; 145 episodes
1992	The Tonight Show with Jay Leno	Various Characters	
1992	Civil Wars	Jack Cort	Episode: "Das Boat House"
1992	Evening Shade	Jesse	Episode: "I'll Be Home for Christmas"
1993	Family Matters	Wayne	Episode: "The Way the Ball Bounces"
1993	Hangin' with Mr. Cooper	Mr. Graves	Episode: "How to Succeed in Business Without Really Trying"
1994	Married... with Children	Wendell	Episode: "Business Sucks"
1994	Dave's World	Guy	Episode: "You Can't Always Get What You Want"
1995	The Boys Are Back	Bob	Episode: "Searching for Sarah Hansen"
1995	Friends	Airline Passenger	Episode: "The One Where Rachel Finds Out"
1995	Hudson Street	Howie	Episode: "The Hit Parade"
1995	Too Something		Episode: "The Jacket"
1996	Coach	Oliver	Episode: "Just Short of the Goal"
1996	The Drew Carey Show	Mr. Jones	Episode: "What the Zoning Inspector Saw"
1997	Seinfeld	Rider	Episode: "The Muffin Tops"
1997	The Secret World of Alex Mack	Mr. O'Reilly	Episode: "Driving"
1997	Touched by an Angel	Leo	Episode: "Sandcastles"
1997	George and Leo		Episode: "The Cameo Episode"
1997	Baywatch		Episode: "Eel Nino"
1998	Mike Hammer, Private Eye	Puff Puff the Bunny	2 episodes
1998	Working	Chaplain	Episode: "Armageddon Outta Here"
1999	Oh, Grow Up	Harry Tatham	Episode: "Himbo"
2000–02	Son of the Beach	Chappy	10 episodes
2003	Lucky	Piney	Episode: "Lie, Cheat & Deal"
2003	Burl's	Gym Instructor	Short
2003–08	All Grown Up!	Stu Pickles / Executive	19 episodes
2004	That '70s Show	Old Man Shinsky	Episode: "Rip This Joint"
2005	Yes, Dear	Mr. Shipley	Episode: "High School Reunion"
2007	Papa's Bag	Papa	Short
2009	Easy to Assemble	Jack	Episode: "Bitter is Better"
2009	Nora Falls	Avery	Short
2011–12	The Garfield Show	Anthony Allwork / Ghost Cat	5 episodes

=== Video games ===
Year	Title	Role	Notes
1998	Rugrats Adventure Game	Stu Pickles	
1998	Rugrats: Search for Reptar	Stu Pickles	
1998	The Rugrats Movie	Stu Pickles	The game tie-in for the movie of the same name.
1999	Rugrats: Scavenger Hunt	Stu Pickles	
1999	Rugrats: Studio Tour	Stu Pickles	
1999	Rugrats: Time Travelers	Stu Pickles	
2001	Rugrats: Castle Capers	Stu Pickles	
2002	Rugrats: Royal Ransom	Stu Pickles	Uncredited
2003	Rugrats Go Wild!	Stu Pickles	The game tie-in for the movie of the same name.

== Work as a writer ==
- The Don Rickles Show (1968, 1 episode) – Writer
- The Many Sides of Don Rickles (1970) – Writer
- The Addams Family Fun House (1973) – Writer
