= Rugrats in Paris: The Movie (video game) =

2000 video game

- Nintendo 64 cover art for North America
- Developers: Avalanche Software (PS1 & N64); Software Creations (GBC); KnowWonder (PC)
- Publishers: THQ; Mattel Interactive (PC)
- Composers: Cate Pelose (PS1 & N64); Suddi Raval (GBC); Martin Goodall (GBC)
- Platforms: PlayStation; Game Boy Color; Nintendo 64; Microsoft Windows
- Release: PlayStation, Nintendo 64 & Game Boy Color; NA: November 8, 2000; EU: March 30, 2001; Microsoft Windows; NA: January 1, 2001; EU: January 3, 2003
- Genre: Action-adventure
- Modes: Single-player, multiplayer

Rugrats in Paris: The Movie is a video game based on the 2000 animated movie of the same name (in turn based on the Nickelodeon animated series Rugrats). The game follows the adventures of the Rugrats in a European theme park. A console version of the game was released in 2000, for the PlayStation, Nintendo 64, and a handheld version for Game Boy Color. A version for Microsoft Windows was later released in 2001. The console version's gameplay is similar to Rugrats: Studio Tour, but Paris’ attractions sometimes have minigames too. The handheld gameplay is a side-scrolling platformer. The Windows version's gameplay is an adventure game in which the player must find Chuckie's Wawa Bear. The PlayStation and Game Boy Color versions were re-released in 2026 as part of the Rugrats: Retro Rewind Collection compilation.

== Gameplay ==
=== PlayStation and Nintendo 64 ===
Tommy Pickles' father has been sent to Europe to fix a broken robot at EuroReptarLand, and has decided to bring his family and friends with him. Kimi explains to the gang that Robosnail has trapped the princess of EuroReptarLand, and it's up to them to save her. In order to fight Robosnail, they need to control Reptar using a special helmet. The player can choose between six playable characters throughout the game: Tommy, Chuckie, Phil, Lil, Angelica, or Kimi. There are approximately 16 levels, as well as hidden bonus levels, in both single and multi-player mini-games. The object of the game is to collect enough gold Reptar tickets to buy the Reptar Helmet that controls a Giant Robot Reptar. Tickets are earned during mini-games, and can also be collected throughout the park. During most mini-games, the player plays against ninjas; aside from mini-games, the theme park is otherwise devoid of other people.

=== Game Boy Color ===
This version features eight side-scrolling levels and seven mini-games, while the plot involves Chuckie and the other Rugrats searching the theme park for a princess to become his new mother. The game includes Dil as an additional character, unlike the home console versions. Each mini-game is played with a different character. Many mini-games include a time limit during which the player must complete the game. Tickets, earned by playing mini-games, allow the player to advance to new levels, which are accessed via an overhead map of the park. A password is provided after the completion of each level, allowing the player to resume the game at a later point.

=== Microsoft Windows ===
This version includes six mini-games, and involves the Rugrats searching for Chuckie's "wawa" bear at the theme park.

== Reception ==
Reception

Aggregate scores
Aggregator	Score			
Aggregator	GBC	N64	PC	PS
GameRankings	49.50%	69.50%		62.67%
Metacritic		64/100		

Review scores
Publication	Score			
Publication	GBC	N64	PC	PS
AllGame				4/5
Electronic Gaming Monthly		6.5/10		
IGN	3/10	6/10		6/10
Jeuxvideo.com		12/20		11/20
Nintendo Power		6.8/10		
Official Nintendo Magazine		71%		
Official U.S. PlayStation Magazine				3/5
PCMag			3/5	

The game was met with mixed reception upon release. GameRankings and Metacritic gave it a score of 62.67% for the PlayStation version; 69.50% and 64 out of 100 for the Nintendo 64 version; and 49.50% for the Game Boy Color version. In their first weeks of sale in North America, the Nintendo 64 version was the ninth highest-selling game of the week, the Game Boy Color version the fifth highest-selling.

Joe Rybicki of Official U.S. PlayStation Magazine wrote that the PlayStation version was not "the most impressive kid game" he had ever seen, but noted that it had some positive elements. Rybicki wrote that while none of the mini-games were "mind-blowing," they "are entertaining for kids of various ages. However, the touchy controls and poor collision detection may make trouble for really young kids." Tom Zjaba of AllGame, who reviewed the PlayStation version, praised its two-player mode and wrote that the game's theme park "features a nice amount of detail and loads of variety between the different areas. There are some clipping problems and a few bland environments, but this platformer is for the most part visually pleasing. As is the case with most 3D platform titles, there are also some camera problems and control quirks, neither of which is bad enough to hamper the fun factor." Zjaba concluded that while it was not "groundbreaking," it was still "a good game for children new to the PlayStation."

Marc Nix of IGN felt that the PlayStation version would be too difficult for young children, and criticized its non-simultaneous two-player mode, as well as its repetitive loading times. Nix praised the game's frame rate and music, but criticized the poor quality of its sound effects and voice overs, and wrote, "The graphics are beautifully colorful and brimming with details, but the engine has shaky textures, break-up, and all other manner of polygon errors. Still, most kids won't care when there's ninjas to battle." Nix also noted, "Unfortunately, there are no people in Reptarland besides the babies themselves – a very eerie phenomenon that would scare most kids if it happened for real – so there's nobody to interact with or have fun with outside the games themselves." Nix criticized the Game Boy Color version for its "stiff" controls, its password feature, and its poor graphics. Nix also criticized the gameplay for being slow, tedious, and difficult, particularly for young children.

Cory D. Lewis of IGN criticized the Nintendo 64 version for its slow-moving characters, although he called the game "simple, yet fun on a very basic level," noting that it was more likely to appeal to younger children. Lewis offered particular praise for the game's miniature golf mini-game, as well as the game's sound, music, and graphics, although he criticized its frame rate. Sallie Sarrel of PC Magazine rated the Windows version 3 out of 5 and praised its "wonderful" animation, but criticized its difficult navigation.
