= Heroes of Ruin =

2012 video game

- Developer: n-Space
- Publisher: Square Enix
- Producer: Timothy Schwalk
- Designer: Brendan McLeod
- Composer: Alexander Puttnam
- Platform: Nintendo 3DS
- Release: PAL: June 15, 2012; NA: July 17, 2012
- Genre: Action role-playing game
- Modes: Single-player, multiplayer

Heroes of Ruin is an action role-playing game developed by n-Space and published by Square Enix for the Nintendo 3DS. It was released on June 15, 2012, in Europe and July 17 in North America. Square Enix London Studios worked with n-Space for the development.

== Gameplay ==
Heroes of Ruin is an action role-playing game in which the player battles various enemies such as snipers, beasts, and fencers.

The game uses both StreetPass and SpotPass technology. Using StreetPass, players can use a feature called "Traders Network", and trade items with other players. In the shop, players can sell items for points, which can be used to buy items which would otherwise be unobtainable. Using SpotPass, players can complete daily challenges for a year after release. The community website will allow players to keep track of their completed challenges, and find even more challenges to complete.

== Plot ==
The story of Heroes of Ruin follows a mercenary who is attempting to find a cure for the ruler of the city of Nexus, a sphinx named Ataraxis, who is dying from a curse. The hero can either create an alliance with others or adventure separately. There are many strange and dangerous creatures in the land, including the evil force behind the curse, which the hero eventually confronts.

Four different playable characters are available:

- The Vindicator is a Leomar (anthropomorphic feline) warrior from the city of Sanctum who fights using two-handed swords and curative magic. The Vindicator takes on the mission to save Lord Ataraxis to redeem himself after his fall from grace from his order.
- The Gunslinger is a former criminal who fights primarily using firearms and makeshift explosives. He takes on the mission to save Lord Ataraxis hoping to find a way to repay a huge monetary debt.
- The Alchitect is a female elf from the city of Requiem who fights using magic spells and polearms. She has taken up the quest to save Lord Ataraxis to prove her worth and become one of the most powerful and feared spell-casters in the world.
- The Savage, a warrior who was exiled from his tribe, uses hand-to-hand combat. He takes on the mission to save Lord Ataraxis in order to gain power and glory.

Fifty years after a major conflict known as the War of Ruin, the sphinx Ataraxis, ruler of Nexus, is dying from a curse. The Hero is traveling by ship to the city of Nexus to find a way to help Ataraxis, however, the ship is destroyed by a giant sea creature, the Leviathan. The survivors of the shipwreck drift to an island, among those are the Hero, the elf Fironel, and the two Princes of Nexus, Solon and Adrian. After arriving to Nexus using a found ship, Solon tasks the Hero with finding Eckhardt, one of Nexus' top sorcerers. After being rescued alongside his daughter Katrina, Eckhardt reveals that he was kidnapped by pirates who forced him to create monsters, including the Leviathan itself; afterwards, the Hero kills the Leviathan at Eckhardt's request.

Then, the Hero is sent to the ruins of the elven Kingdom of Salvera by Eckhardt and Marcus, King of Nexus, to find the ghost of the deceased elf King Keltas, hoping to find a way to end Ataraxis' curse. Upon arriving at the ruins of Salvera, the Hero finds out that Fironel has used magic to trap the souls of Keltas and his council in the bodies of savage beasts, in an attempt to ensure that Salvera's secret information will not be leaked to the outside world. She then flees and the Hero kills the beasts, releasing Keltas and the council members. Upon his release, Keltas gives the Hero a book from Ataraxis, which reveals that the War of Ruin was finished after a display of power from three beasts called "Ruinlords"; the three Ruinlords, including Ataraxis, used to be ordinary people who had a strong desire to end the War of Ruin, and thus used the power of a magic Crystal in order to end the war, transforming themselves into the Ruinlord beasts in the process. Eckhardt and Marcus decide to keep secret the newly acquired information, fearing that if it is known by the general population, it would create civil unrest.

King Marcus sends the Hero to Ataraxis' former secret workshop, located in the northern region of Frost Reaches to search for the magic Crystal mentioned in the book. When the Hero is about to get the Crystal, Fironel reappears, states that she has a reason to prevent the use of the Crystal, takes it and flees. She then leaves a message with King Marcus demanding that the Hero must bring Ataraxis' book to Predator's Peak. Once both meet, the Hero and Fironel engage in a "winner takes all" showdown that is won by the Hero. Fironel hands over the Crystal, but warns the Hero that its misuse could be highly dangerous. Upon his return to Nexus, the Hero is met by Katrina who tells him that during his absence, chaos ensued in Nexus' magic labs, the "Soul Void", prompting Eckhardt, King Marcus and the Princes to go there and try to control the situation. At Katrina's request, the Hero goes to the Soul Void where he meets another Nexus sorcerer named Rigel.

== Development ==
Square Enix producer George Wright stated they "were excited to make a game specifically for [the 3DS] that makes use of its great connectivity and social features." He also stated that the game "combines elements from action adventure and action RPG games. It takes inspiration from a wide range of games [...] but it also brings its own take on the genre." n-Space has also stated that Nintendo helped with development to unlock extra power in the 3DS "for multiplayer features."

== Reception ==
Reception

Aggregate score
Aggregator	Score
Metacritic	69/100 (based on 48 reviews)

Review scores
Publication	Score
Computer Games Magazine	5/10
Destructoid	7/10
Eurogamer	7/10
Game Informer	6/10
GameRevolution	7/10
GameSpot	6/10
GamesRadar+	2.5/5
IGN	7/10
Nintendo Life	8/10
Nintendo World Report	8/10
Polygon	4/10
RPGFan	69/100

The game received average reviews, with a 69% Metacritic rating. IGN's Chris Schilling rated the game 7/10, commenting that "it's graphically weak, yet technically excellent, while its generic mechanics slot into a boldly designed, connected framework".
