= Bug Riders =

1997 video game

- Developer: n-Space
- Publisher: GT Interactive
- Platforms: PlayStation, Microsoft Windows
- Release: NA: December 1, 1997; EU: 1998
- Genre: Racing
- Modes: Single-player, multiplayer

Bug Riders: The Race of Kings is a video game developed by n-Space and published by GT Interactive for the PlayStation and Windows in 1997, followed by a re-release on PlayStation Network in 2011.

== Gameplay ==
Bug Riders is a game which involves a bug-riding race to determine who will replace the dying emperor of the planet Entymion. To accelerate, the player strikes their bug with a crop. Careful rhythm is demanded, as using the crop too frequently will cause the bug to cry out in pain and slow down.

== Development ==
The game was showcased at E3 1997.

== Reception ==
Reception

Review scores
Publication	Score
AllGame	1/5 (PS1)
Consoles +	82% (PS1)
Electronic Gaming Monthly	4.125/10 (PS1) (Note: The four critics in the Review Crew gave individual scores of 5.0, 4.0, 3.0, and 4.5.)
Game Informer	6.75/10 (PS1)
GameFan	50% (PS1) (Note: Three critics of GameFan gave individual scores of 42, 55, and 52.)
IGN	3/10 (PS1)
Next Generation	2/5 (PS1)
PC Games (DE)	45% (PC)

Bug Riders received generally negative reviews, primarily because of the system for controlling the bugs. In particular, critics overwhelmingly detested the cropping system used to accelerate, finding it overly difficult to master. Shawn Smith argued in Electronic Gaming Monthly, "Let's just stick with a standard 'press the button and hold it' acceleration that practically EVERY other racing game has. It's what we're used to as gamers. When something like this comes along, we don't know what to do." Most critics also found that the bugs having minds of their own, allowing them to fly without input from the player and sometimes resist the player's inputs, proved to be frustrating.

The level designs had a more mixed response, with some praising them for their visual design and variety, while others found they did not make it obvious where the player needed to go. While there was also scattered praise for elements such as the music, critics felt the control issues overrode all the game's positive elements. GamePro, for example, opined that "While there are some cool weapons to pick up as well as a good variety of bug steeds, because of bad control, praising these aspects is like toweling off the Titanic." (Note: GamePro gave scores of 4.0/5 for graphics, 3.0/5 for sound, 1.5/5 for control, and 2.0/5 for fun factor.) Next Generation commented, "The premise has some promise, offering all sorts of new gameplay ideas like riding living creatures and flying through the air. However, these same ideas, at least the execution of them, are what bring the game down."
