= TigerShark =

1997 video game

- PlayStation Cover Art
- Developer: n-Space
- Publisher: GT Interactive
- Platforms: PlayStation, Microsoft Windows
- Release: NA: 25 March 1997; EU: 10 August 1997 (PC); EU: 1997 (PS)
- Genre: Combat flight simulator
- Modes: Single player, multiplayer

TigerShark is a 1997 video game published by GT Interactive for the PlayStation and Windows, and the first game to be released by its developer, n-Space.

== Story ==
TigerShark is set in the Japanese archipelago in the near future, where the Japanese Economic Collective have turned to sources of geothermal power known as 'geothermal taps' in the faultline across the Japanese coast. A series of major earthquakes caused by tapping into this faultline destabilise and sink many of the Japanese islands. Sensing an opportunity, a rogue commander of the Federated States of Russia invades and occupies the remainder of Japan, planning to continue to mine the faultline for energy. The player is tasked to launch a counter-invasion by the United States against the rogue Russian commander, and in turn save the world.

== Gameplay ==
TigerShark is a naval combat game in which the player operates the titular Tigershark, a futuristic hydrofoil powered submarine. It features a unique mechanic in which the player alternates between navigating the vessel both at and below the ocean's surface in 3D. Players encounter varied enemies, including small and large ships, cruisers, fixed and moving guns, and mines, and can use a number of weapons, including torpedoes, flak, and main guns.

The game features one training level and nine regular levels, assigning players with multiple targets, from radars to large installations, which the player must destroy to reach the next mission. Some missions require the player to complete additional objectives, such as escorting and protecting allies, or escaping a volcano before it erupts.

== Development ==
The development of TigerShark ran on the game engine that was planned for use by the company's intended first product, RazorWing, a title that was developed in association with the product development division of Sony Computer Entertainment America (which itself was absorbed into the larger Sony Imagesoft and was renamed to Sony Interactive Studios America), but after Sony cancelled the title, the company shifted its attention to GT Interactive Software, where it developed TigerShark.

== Reception ==
Reception

Review scores
Publication	Score	
Publication	PC	PS
Computer Games Strategy Plus	3/5	
Electronic Gaming Monthly		5.0
GameSpot	5.7	
IGN		6.5
Next Generation		3/5
PC PowerPlay	74%	
Official Australian PlayStation Magazine		7/10
PlayStation Pro		4/10
Computer Game Entertainment	76%	

Reviews for TigerShark were average. Positive reviews focused upon the novelty of the gameplay, with praise for the originality of its mechanics. Peter Sharpe of PC Powerplay remarked that "being able to quickly submerge and surface is enjoyable as the action dynamically changes depending on your depth". A reviewer for Computer Games Strategy Plus agreed, praising how the "controls available expand considerably at the same time that you have to start thinking in 3D" when in the underwater mode. A reviewer for Next Generation stated that TigerShark's premise is "promising and earns points for uniqueness".

Negative reviews of TigerShark critiqued the repetition and difficulty of the gameplay. In a particularly low review, Peter Sharpe of PlayStation Pro expressed that the game "plays badly", stating that "variation is something that doesn't feature strongly in TigerShark", as "players will soon bore of blasting the copious, bland and uninteresting enemies". Reviewers for Electronic Gaming Monthly expressed frustration for the "unfair" and unbalanced difficulty of the game, as "enemy opponents are everywhere and are practically unstoppable". Jeff Gerstmann of GameSpot also expressed annoyance that "many of the missions are very difficult, and you must start each one from the beginning every time if you die".

Reviewers provided mixed opinions about the presentation of the game. A reviewer for Next Generation critiqued the lack of detail in the game, noting "the undersea and surface environments are not very graphically compelling". Jeff Gerstmann of GameSpot stated "Tigershark's graphics are decent, but the murky sea depths lack detail...The game moves smoothly enough, though the objects could have use more polygons - as it is everything looks square". Reviewers also expressed mixed opinions on the graphics requirements. Peter Smith of Computer Games Strategy Plus stated "TigerShark looks good normally, but throw a 3Dfx accelerator card into your rig and it looks spectacular". Peter Sharpe of PC Powerplay critiqued the system requirements for the game with other cards, stating "a stock standard Pentium 133 will move the frame rate along at an acceptable rate, but the graphics are best described as average.
