= Doctor Detroit =

1983 film by Michael Pressman

- Theatrical release poster
- Directed by: Michael Pressman
- Written by: Bruce Jay Friedman; Carl Gottlieb; Robert Boris
- Produced by: Robert K. Weiss
- Starring: Dan Aykroyd; Howard Hesseman; George Furth; James Brown; T. K. Carter; Donna Dixon; Fran Drescher; Lydia Lei; Lynn Whitfield
- Cinematography: King Baggot
- Edited by: Christopher Greenbury
- Music by: Lalo Schifrin; Ira Newborn; Devo; Pattie Brooks; Dan Aykroyd; James Brown; T. K. Carter
- Production company: Brillstein Company
- Distributed by: Universal Pictures
- Release date: May 6, 1983
- Running time: 89 minutes
- Country: United States
- Language: English
- Budget: $8 million
- Box office: $10,375,893

Doctor Detroit is a 1983 American comedy film directed by Michael Pressman with writing by Bruce Jay Friedman, Carl Gottlieb, and Robert Boris. The film stars Dan Aykroyd, Howard Hesseman, Lynn Whitfield, Fran Drescher, and Donna Dixon, with a special appearance by James Brown. It was the first film Aykroyd made after the death of John Belushi, and the first one in which he is not sharing top bill with other actors. Aykroyd and his co-star Dixon married soon after the film's release.

== Plot ==
Introverted geek Clifford Skridlow is a professor of comparative literature at the financially strapped Monroe College in Chicago.

Smooth Walker, a pimp, owes $80,000 to "Mom", a gruff Chicago mob boss. Attempting to weasel out of his debt, Smooth invents a fictitious mobster, the flamboyant "Doctor Detroit", a ruthless chiropractor who allegedly is overrunning Smooth's turf. Smooth sees Clifford out to dinner alone at a restaurant, and decides to enlist him to pose as the "Doctor." Smooth and his girls Monica, Jasmine, Karen, and Thelma, party with Clifford and give him the best night of his life. The next morning, during a faculty meeting, Clifford gets a phone call from the girls and learns about their troubles with Mom, that Smooth has skipped town, and that according to Smooth, they are now Clifford's girls. Clifford agrees to assume the persona of Doctor Detroit in an effort to help them out of their jam.

Meanwhile, Monroe College anticipates a corporate endowment from Rousehorn Consolidated Industries to be presented by its CEO, Harmon Rousehorn. If the contribution is large enough, it will allow the college to remain open.

While Clifford is teaching classes, grading papers, catering a faculty party and assisting in hosting the visiting CEO, his Doctor Detroit alter ego has to find a way to get Thelma out of a solicitation charge, hold Mom at bay, and appear at the Players Ball to be proclaimed the new King of the Pimps while simultaneously appearing at Monroe College's annual Alumni Dinner. When Mom shows up at the Players Ball, she figures out that Doctor Detroit and Professor Skridlow are one and the same, and duels him with sword-length kebab skewers in front of the assembled academics. Mom is defeated, and the two functions combine into one joyous, spectacular party, as the ultimate fates of all are revealed, including Clifford's marriage to Karen.

== Cast ==
- Dan Aykroyd as Clifford Skridlow / "Doctor Detroit"
- Howard Hesseman as "Smooth" Walker
- Fran Drescher as Karen Blittstein
- Donna Dixon as Monica McNeil
- Lydia Lei as Jasmine Wu
- T. K. Carter as Diavolo Washington
- Lynn Whitfield as Thelma Cleland
- Kate Murtagh as "Mom"
- George Furth as Arthur Skridlow
- Nan Martin as Margaret Skridlow
- Peter Aykroyd as Mr. Frankman
- Glenne Headly as Miss Debbylike
- Robert Cornthwaite as Professor Blount
- Parley Baer as Judge Robert E. Lee Jefferson-Davis
- John Kapelos as Rush Street Dude
- James Brown as Himself, The Bandleader
- Steven Williams as Junior Sweet
- Andrew Duggan as Harmon Rausehorn
- Blackie Dammett as Eddie "Four Eyes"
- Cacey Kustosz as "The Streaker"

== Filming ==
The film was shot on location in Chicago and Evanston, Illinois, as well as at the University of Southern California and Biltmore Hotel in Los Angeles, California, during the summer of 1982.

== Soundtrack ==
Doctor Detroit

Soundtrack album by Various artists
- Released: April 1983
- Genre: New wave; synth-pop; R&B; funk
- Length: 35:53
- Label: Backstreet; MCA; WEA
- Producer: Ira Newborn; Robert K. Weiss; Devo; Lalo Schifrin

Professional ratings
Review scores
Source	Rating
AllMusic	link

A soundtrack album for the film was released on the labels Backstreet, MCA and WEA. Devo performed the title theme, which plays over the opening credits, as well as "Luv-Luv", and released an EP including both tracks and a longer dance remix of the theme song. A music video was also produced for the theme, incorporating footage from the film. James Brown makes a cameo appearance in the film, performing "Get Up Offa That Thing/Dr. Detroit".

=== Track listing ===
Side one
No.	Title	Writer(s)	Performer(s)	Length
1.	"Theme from Doctor Detroit"	Mark Mothersbaugh; Gerald Casale	Devo	3:10
2.	"Hold Him"	Ira Newborn; Pattie Brooks	Pattie Brooks; Dan Aykroyd	3:22
3.	"King of Soul"	Newborn	James Brown	2:40
4.	"Yo Skridlow"	T. K. Carter; Anthony Patler	T. K. Carter; Dan Aykroyd	4:40
5.	"Working Girls"	Newborn; Brooks	Pattie Brooks; Dan Aykroyd	4:48

Side two
No.	Title	Writer(s)	Performer(s)	Length
1.	"Get Up Offa That Thing/Doctor Detroit"	James Brown	James Brown	3:23
2.	"Luv-Luv"	Mothersbaugh; Casale	Devo	3:36
3.	"You Are the One"	Lalo Schifrin; Glen Ballard	Pattie Brooks	4:05
4.	"Get It On and Have a Party"	Newborn; Brooks	Pattie Brooks	6:09
Total length:				35:53

== Reception ==
The film received generally negative reviews from critics. Writing in the Chicago Tribune, critic Gene Siskel gave the film two and a half stars and called it "a mess, but a genial mess." Roger Ebert gave it three stars, saying it had "just a humble little screenplay" but also "a lot of funny moments" and a performance by Dan Aykroyd that showed "a lot of invention." Review aggregator Rotten Tomatoes reports that 29% of seven critics have given the film a positive review.

In her autobiography, Enter Whining, Fran Drescher commented that Doctor Detroit was expected to be a major hit for the summer of 1983 but fell short of expectations, grossing $10.8 million on a budget of $8 million.

== See also ==
- List of American films of 1983
