= Geist (video game) =

2005 video game

- North American cover art
- Developer: n-Space
- Publisher: Nintendo
- Director: Dan O'Leary
- Producers: Ted Newman; Hideki Konno; Kensuke Tanabe
- Designer: Andrew Paciga
- Artist: W. Randy King
- Composers: Brad Martin; Micheal Reed
- Engine: N-Gin
- Platform: GameCube
- Release: NA: August 15, 2005; EU: October 7, 2005; AU: November 3, 2005
- Genre: Action-adventure
- Modes: Single-player, multiplayer

Geist (German for "ghost") is an action-adventure video game developed by n-Space and published by Nintendo for the GameCube, released on August 15, 2005, in North America, on October 7, 2005, in Europe and on November 3, 2005, in Australia. A Japanese release was cancelled.

A prototype of the game was developed by n-Space, who approached Nintendo to be the game's publisher. Nintendo accepted, making Geist the second GameCube game published by Nintendo to receive an M-rating from the Entertainment Software Rating Board (the first being Eternal Darkness: Sanity's Requiem). In the following years, both companies worked closely on the project, with its first showing at E3 2003. Originally announced to be part of the GameCube's 2003 line-up, it was delayed multiple times, making it two years of delay for fine-tuning. During that time, the game's genre changed from first-person shooter to first-person action-adventure with second-person elements.

Geist received mixed reviews upon release, with critics praising the game for its unique concepts, graphics, and story, while criticism was directed at its poor performance, sluggish controls, and awkward animations.

== Plot ==
John Raimi, a civilian scientist and member of counter-terrorism team CR-2, is sent to investigate the Volks Corporation in Southern France and retrieve undercover agent Thomas Bryson, Raimi's best friend. After meeting with Bryson, an alarm goes off forcing CR-2 to battle their way out, suffering casualties. Suddenly, one of the agents becomes possessed and kills the rest of the team, with the exceptions of Raimi and Bryson, with the fate of the agent left unknown. Raimi is then captured and has his soul removed from his body, with Alexander Volks himself attempting to brainwash him to create a new soldier for Project Z. Before this can happen, a spirit named Gigi frees him, and after being taught the basics of being a ghost, sets out to regain his body and save Bryson.

Eventually, he finds and damages the machine used in ghost separation right before Bryson and his soul are separated. In the chaos that ensues, Rourke, head of Volks' military department, orders that a "catalyst beam" be fired at the machine, resulting in monsters to emerge from a rift that forms. Raimi then goes and heads towards a compound, noticing that the escaped creatures from the rift roam inside it, killing anything not from their world.

After saving Bryson, Raimi chooses to stay behind to find his original body, while Bryson leaves on a helicopter to inform his superiors of the situation. But as he departs, Raimi's body becomes possessed by a being known as Wraith, and unwillingly shoots down Bryson. He then follows Wraith until he ends up at a mansion and reunites with Gigi. There, she tells him about her connection to Volks; When she was alive, she lived with her brother, Alexander Volks, and her aunt in the mansion. As a young boy, Alexander was obsessed with the occult, often reading books on the matter. One day, as he was reading a book in a big tree, Gigi attempted to get his attention. Being told to go away, she climbed the tree to try again, but fell, resulting in her death. Desperate, Alexander came up with a plan to use his knowledge of the occult to save his sister. Bringing her to a "special place" (a seal to a demon realm), he attempted to revive her in a ritual. This failed, however, and instead turned her soul into a ghost. To make matters worse, Alexander himself became slightly possessed by an ancient demon, giving him a symbol-like scar above his right eye. Unaware of both results, Alexander became a puppet of the demon. It is then revealed that Volks' Demon wants to seize control over the world through Alexander and his corporation.

After being captured again forced to undergo brainwashing once more, Raimi manages to escape due to damage caused by nearby monsters. Regaining his body after encountering and defeating Wraith, he goes on to stop the Volks Corporation from killing and possessing world leaders (Project Z). After preventing the attacks from occurring, he faces off with a fully possessed Alexander; his death results in Gigi being pulled into his body with Raimi soon following suit. He ends up in an ethereal realm, where he kills Volks' Demon, freeing both Alexander and Gigi. Afterward, Raimi escapes from a collapsing cave and is picked up by a helicopter. There he reunites with Bryson, who survived the attack, Anna Richardson, and Phantom, two characters he had previously possessed.

== Gameplay ==
The game is divided into levels, which in turn are divided into stages. Each level starts with a cutscene and has one or more boss fights. The game saves automatically after each level. A level is progressed through by completing its stages. A stage can be a period in the game in which the player has to puzzle and/or fight his way to a certain point or can be a boss fight. Upon completing a stage, a new checkpoint is reached.

As a disembodied spirit, Raimi cannot interact with the physical world except through possession. Gravity still affects him though he floats and can elevate himself for short periods and he cannot pass through solid walls. Normally, his sight is blue/white, but when standing at the same spot as an object or creature, his sight turns red. Ghosts are invisible and intangible, though they can be seen by other ghosts and animals can sense their presence even when they are possessing something. Without a host, a ghost is a lot faster than the physical world and sees everything in slow motion.

When Raimi possesses an object, such as a dog food bowl, he sees things from the object's perspective even if the device has no visual apparatus. He can provide some motive force on an ordinarily immobile object, activate electronics, and alter an object's appearance; for example, turning water from a possessed faucet red, or changing the reflection in a mirror. Creatures can only be possessed when badly frightened or startled. This is accomplished by performing a set combination of actions. Glimpses of a host's recent memories are sometimes gained immediately upon possession. Raimi has the same control over a host body that he would over his own. The only exceptions are an inability to make the host approach something which frightens him or her very badly, and the very difficult task of resisting something the host likes.

If a host is killed or destroyed, Raimi is unharmed and returns to his ethereal state. However, he cannot remain outside a host indefinitely; his spirit is continuously pulled towards the afterlife. Raimi can only anchor himself to the world by possessing something, though absorbing life from small plants grants him additional time in this world.

=== Host abilities ===
The abilities of hosts differ. The most noticeable is the way the world is seen through the eyes of the host. For instance, most animals see the world in several shades of grey, while imps have binoculars-shaped sight. For the most part, Raimi gets to possess guards who carry one weapon and an unlimited amount of ammunition. Some weapons have a secondary function in the form of a grenade launcher or infrared scope. Other possessive humans are professors, engineers and several people with different supportive jobs. They cannot do battle, but allow access to new areas and sometimes carry objects with them that may be needed to proceed. Human hosts have no memory of what occurs when Raimi possesses them. They recall only being badly frightened, and then suddenly being in a different room. They will not do anything or get less frightened when Raimi dispossesses them, so they can be possessed again at any time.

Animals also cannot be used for combat, but are vital to reaching some areas. Due to their size, rats and dogs (rabbits and roaches in multiplayer) can crawl through some small holes and reach the room on the other side. Bats can fly to otherwise unreachable areas. Other animals are tools to make a human host possessive. The only exception to animals being useless for combat situations are imps, but they can only be possessed in the multiplayer mode.

Each host has a different ability. Some human hosts can sprint and others can crawl. This means a character that can sprint cannot crawl or vice versa and this goes for all abilities. In some cases, the L button activates the zoom function.

=== Multiplayer ===
There are three core multiplayer modes: Possession Deathmatch, Capture the Host, and Hunt. In Possession Deathmatch, players start off as ghosts and are invulnerable until they possess a host, where it then plays as a typical deathmatch mode. In Capture the Host, players must kill opponents and deliver their hosts to their respective bases. In Hunt, players either participate as ghosts or hosts; hosts try to kill ghosts with special weapons, while ghosts try to make the hosts commit suicide. Power-ups are also available, being able to adjusted in the game's settings. Additional characters and maps can also be unlocked by finding collectibles in the story mode.

== Development ==
Work on Geist started in 2002. Its early working title was Fear. N-Space learned that Nintendo was interested in a first-person shooter action game with a unique feel to it. n-Space came up with the idea of making a game with an invisible man as the protagonist. From there, the concept changed from being an invisible person to being a ghost and Poltergeist.

After about eight months of work, n-Space finished the prototype, that had originally ran on an Xbox Game development kit, and sent it to Nintendo of America, from which it was sent to Nintendo. Nintendo latched onto the game, and it was decided N-Space and Nintendo would work closely together to develop the game. After six months, object possession was introduced in the game after some suggestions from Shigeru Miyamoto. Geist was first shown to the public at the E3 2003 and it was later stated that Geist would be released the same year. In the months after the E3, both companies realized they "weren't working on the same game"; N-Space had envisioned Geist to be a first-person shooter while Nintendo (more specifically, Kensuke Tanabe) considered it to be a first-person action-adventure. The adjustments caused the game to be delayed many times until it was finally released two years later in 2005, but Geist was present at both the E3 2004 and E3 2005.

Nearing the end of development, a Nintendo DS port was rumored by an IGN tour to be in development. Although this port was never announced, and no information of it has ever been officially released, n-Space did have development kits for the DS at the time, and traces of the port's existence have been found within the ROM of the DS version of Call of Duty 4: Modern Warfare, which was developed by n-Space, as two text documents for the credits of "Geist DS" are present. The Geist franchise is currently owned by Nintendo, due to their contract with n-Space.

== Reception ==
Reception

Aggregate score
Aggregator	Score
Metacritic	66/100

Review scores
Publication	Score
Edge	4/10
Electronic Gaming Monthly	5.33/10
Eurogamer	6/10
Game Informer	6/10
GamePro	3.5/5 stars
GameRevolution	C
GameSpot	7.8/10
GameSpy	3/5 stars
GameTrailers	7.4/10
GameZone	8/10
IGN	7.8/10
Nintendo Power	5/10
Common Sense Media	2/5 stars
Detroit Free Press	3/4 stars

Geist was Nintendo's E3 2003 surprise announcement, as it was not a new title from one of their staple franchises and no rumors about it had been going around before the E3 2003. In general, people were enthusiastic about the demo.

Two years later, the game received “mixed and average" reviews according to the review aggregator website Metacritic. While the game was praised for its originality in ideas, gameplay, and story, it was held back by a weak engine (IGN: "Unfortunately, a game engine incapable of matching n-Space's ambitions occasionally hampers the experience.") which meant Geist was unable to maintain a smooth frame rate throughout the first-person shooter sequences. The game suffered from sluggish shooter controls that were not on par with other first-person shooters of its time. Nintendo World Report wrote: "There's a constant struggle with the controls that makes the game more frustrating than it should be," and IGN called it "not exactly poor, but it certainly doesn't compare to better shooters on the market, either." The game was also burdened by poor character animation and AI. Some reviewers were disappointed the game only allowed one scare tactic per person or animal and did not allow the player to be creative. Or as GameSpot put it: "You'll wonder how the game might have been different if it gave you more freedom to accomplish your objectives."

Most reviews did praise the scare tactics for always being different and fun (Nintendo World Report: "Figuring out how to scare hosts is a lot of fun, especially because the ways in which you scare them are often very inventive"). Although the animation was not considered especially good, the graphics were praised. Altogether, the game was mostly placed in the "reasonable-to-good" range, with remarks as "Geist at least serves as an important reminder that an original game design and a first-person perspective aren't mutually exclusive. The shooter portions of Geist aren't all that special, but there's a lot more to this game than meets the eye" from GameSpot; and, "The concept is refreshingly inventive and Geist is propelled into something much greater than an FPS clone" from IGN; but also, "Unfortunately, no sooner does Geist suggest it can blossom into something fresh and exciting that it's undermined at every turn by a frustrating insistence on being nothing more than a mundane first-person shooter" from Edge.

Jim Schaefer of Detroit Free Press gave the game three stars out of four, saying, "I like this game simply for its twists on an old genre. I enjoy many shooter games, but the ability to change characters gives this one a real personality." CiN Weekly gave it a score of 71 out of 100, saying, "An undeveloped but great take on first-person views makes this a strong rental but iffy purchase." Maxim gave it a score of seven out of ten, saying that players will "spend more time scaring the crap out of people than blowing the crap out of people, which slows down the action." However, Common Sense Media gave it two stars out of five and called it "an original first-person shooter haunted by repetitive gameplay" due to "blocky, dated graphics and choppy slowdowns".

Game Informer listed the game among the worst horror games of all time.
