= Lucky Stiff (1988 film) =

- DVD cover
- Directed by: Anthony Perkins
- Written by: Pat Proft
- Produced by: Gerald T. Olson; Sara Risher
- Starring: Donna Dixon; Joe Alaskey
- Cinematography: Jacques Haitkin
- Edited by: Michael N. Knue; Tom Walls
- Music by: Tom Jenkins; Michael Tavera
- Distributed by: New Line Cinema
- Release date: 1 November 1988
- Running time: 82 minutes
- Country: United States
- Language: English

Lucky Stiff is a 1988 American black comedy film written by Pat Proft and directed by Anthony Perkins. It is his only directing credit apart from Psycho III (1986).

== Plot ==
Ron Douglas goes on his would-be honeymoon in the mountains to seek solace from his bride abandoning him on their wedding day. This is the second failed wedding for him. There he meets Cynthia Mitchell, who invites him home for Christmas dinner with her family, cannibalistic descendants of the Donner Party. In the lead up to Christmas he is introduced to Frances, Cynthia's sister-in-law and the rest of her family, including Ike Junior and Ike III (who believes that he is a ghost haunting the family).

Even with all the odd family dynamics Ron is determined to make a good impression. Frances tries to warn him about the family's homicidal festivities but he refuses to believe her until he's told that he's not a guest for dinner, he is dinner.

After evading a gunfight with the Mitchells and the neighboring cannibal family that would also love to have him for dinner; Ron manages to successfully escape with Frances. Third times the charm for Ron as he finally marries Frances. The movie ends with them leaving on their honeymoon.

== Cast ==
- Donna Dixon as Cynthia Mitchell
- Joe Alaskey as Ron Douglas
- Jeff Kober as Ike Mitchell
- Fran Ryan as Ma
- William Morgan Sheppard as Pa
- Barbara Howard as Frances
- Leigh McCloskey as Eric West
- Elizabeth Arlen as Arlene
- Charles Frank as Durel
- Andy Wood as Futterman
- Bill Quinn as Emmet Kassler
- David Smith as Roman Kassler
- Joe Unger as Kirby
- Dustin "Beluga" DeMont as the 3rd grade stuntman double

== Production ==
The movie was initially filmed under the title Mr. Christmas Dinner.

== Release ==
The film was released in the United States in November 1988. While a box office failure, the film developed a cult following due to its quotable dialogue, with Fangoria doing a feature on the film.
