= Couch Potatoes (game show) =

American game show

- Created by: Ellen Levy; David M. Greenfield
- Presented by: Marc Summers
- Announcer: Joe Alaskey; Jim McKrell
- Country of origin: United States
- No. of episodes: 100

Production
- Production locations: Hollywood Center Studios; Hollywood, California
- Running time: 30 minutes
- Production company: Saban Entertainment

Original release
- Network: Syndicated (daily)
- Release: January 23 – June 9, 1989

Couch Potatoes is an American game show that featured two teams competing in a television-centric quiz game. The program premiered in syndication on January 23, 1989. It aired in first-run until June 9, 1989, for a total of one hundred episodes, and reruns aired after that until September 8, 1989.

Couch Potatoes was hosted by Marc Summers, who at the time was also hosting the children's game show Double Dare on both Nickelodeon and local stations. Comedian and voice actor Joe Alaskey was also featured on the show, serving as its announcer and also playing an on-camera role as Summers' next door neighbor. After Alaskey left the series toward the end of its run, his character was retired and Jim McKrell took over his announcer role (albeit off camera).

Couch Potatoes was taped at Hollywood Center Studios and was a production of Saban Entertainment with Westinghouse Broadcasting's Group W Productions as distributor. The series was created by Ellen Levy and the show's producer-writer David M. Greenfield.

== Gameplay ==
Couch Potatoes featured two teams of three players each, with one of the teams usually a returning champion. To tie in with the overall theme of the show, both teams were given some sort of TV-centric name and the scores were referred to as "ratings points."

The game started with a toss-up question, referred to as the "Tune-In" question, a multiple choice question worth 25 points and control. All six players had the ability to ring in and answer, but answering incorrectly forfeited control to the other team.

The team in control was then asked three questions, referred to as "Spin-Offs". Each question was worth 25 points, and each member of the team could only attempt one question. If at any time the team answered incorrectly, the other team was given a chance to steal control.

Four rounds were played in this manner, and for the third and fourth the point values doubled to 50 for each correct answer.

Late in the run, two additional rounds of questioning were added; the first three rounds were worth 25 points and the last three 50.

=== Couch Up Round ===
The Couch Up Round was the last round and was played as a series of face-offs, with one member from both teams per question.

Each question was a toss-up, with its value set by a randomizer that would freeze as soon as a contestant buzzed in. A correct answer awarded the points, while a miss gave the opponent a chance to steal.

The randomizer could display values from 50 to 200 points in increments of 50, as well as a "Couch Up" message. If this appeared, the trailing team could tie the score with a correct answer; it had no effect on the scores if the leading team answered correctly.

Six questions were asked, and play moved in order from one end of the couch to the other so that every contestant played twice.

The team in the lead at the end of this round won the game and $1,000, and moved on to the Channel Roulette bonus round for a chance to win up to $5,000 more. The losing team received consolation prizes.

If the game ended in a tie, a final tiebreaker question was asked, open to all players. A correct answer won the game, while a miss gave the victory to the opposing team.

=== Channel Roulette ===
The team faced a grid of 12 "channels," 11 of which hid pictures of the casts of TV shows for them to identify. Pictures were worth 100 to 1,000 points, with more obscure shows awarding higher values.

Each team member in turn selected one channel. If a picture was hidden there, its value was announced and the player could then offer one guess. A correct answer awarded the points, while a pass or miss left that channel in play and did not affect the total. Behind one channel was a "Pay TV" screen, which would reset the total to zero if found.

If the team accumulated 1,000 points or more in 30 seconds, they won an additional $5,000; otherwise, they received $1 per point.

Teams stayed on the show until they either played Channel Roulette five times or were defeated.

== Episode status ==
All episodes of Couch Potatoes exist. Reruns began airing on USA Network on September 11, 1989, three days after the show aired for the final time in syndication, and continued to air until March 23, 1990.

== Guests ==
During its eight-month run, Couch Potatoes had numerous celebrity guests on the show; they usually appeared in Round Four, asking questions about their career or show. One show featured Jack Larson and Noel Neill, better known as Jimmy Olsen and Lois Lane from the 1950s series The Adventures of Superman, asking questions about the series. Another notable guest was Gary Coleman, who asked questions about Diff'rent Strokes and mentioned to host Summers he was asked to be the youth chairman for the Just Say No Foundation. During one week, game show celebrities Bob Eubanks, Jim Lange, Janice Pennington, Wink Martindale, Peter Marshall, Johnny Gilbert, and Gary Owens appeared.

Other celebs included Cubby O'Brien from The Mickey Mouse Club, Jay North from Dennis the Menace, Larry Mathews from The Dick Van Dyke Show, Isabel Sanford from The Jeffersons, Dick Sargent from Bewitched, Alaina Reed Hall from 227, Dorothy Lyman from Mama's Family, Khrystyne Haje from "Head of the Class", Steve Allen, and Rebeca Arthur from Perfect Strangers. The premiere episode had Dennis Franz as a guest asking questions about Hill Street Blues.

== See also ==
- Remote Control (game show)
- Telly Addicts
- Test Pattern (game show)
