= Sword Coast Legends =

2015 video game

- Developers: n-Space; Digital Extremes
- Publisher: Digital Extremes
- Director: Dan Tudge
- Composer: Inon Zur
- Platforms: Microsoft Windows, OS X, Linux, PlayStation 4, Xbox One
- Release: Windows, OS X, Linux; October 20, 2015; PlayStation 4, Xbox One; July 19, 2016
- Genre: Action role-playing
- Modes: Single-player, multiplayer

Sword Coast Legends is a 2015 action role-playing game released for Microsoft Windows, OS X, Linux, PlayStation 4, and Xbox One. It is set within the universe of Forgotten Realms, a campaign setting of Dungeons & Dragons.

== Gameplay ==
The game is an action role-playing video game set within the Dungeons & Dragons universe. It features typical races and classes of the Forgotten Realms setting. The game is set in the fictional Sword Coast region of the continent Faerûn on the planet Toril. Graphics are in 3D. One addition to the game is that it allows players to be a "dungeon master" (or DM), as in the tabletop version of Dungeons & Dragons. It features single-player and co-operative multiplayer modes. The game was directed by Dan Tudge. Inon Zur, who previously led the music development of Dragon Age: Origins and Fallout 3, composed, produced, and conducted all the music for the game. The music was performed by the City of Prague Philharmonic Orchestra.

== Development ==
The game was developed by n-Space, in collaboration with Digital Extremes, and was released worldwide on October 20, 2015 for Microsoft Windows, OS X, and Linux, with PlayStation 4, and Xbox One versions coming out in 2016. It would be n-Space's last project before they closed in 2016. On December 11, 2017, it was announced via social media that Sword Coast Legends would no longer be available for retail after December 31, 2017, but that their servers would remain operational "for the foreseeable future." The servers were closed on July 25, 2018 and the game can now be played only offline.

== Reception ==
Reception

Aggregate score
Aggregator	Score
Metacritic	(PC) 61/100 (XOne) 58/100 (PS4) 51/100

Review scores
Publication	Score
Destructoid	(PC) 6/10
Game Informer	(PC) 6.75/10
GameRevolution	(PC) 6/10
GameSpot	(PC) 6/10
Hardcore Gamer	(PC) 4/5
IGN	(PC) 5.5/10
PlayStation Official Magazine – UK	(PS4) 5/10
PC Gamer (UK)	(PC) 55%
RPGamer	(PC) 1.5/5
VentureBeat	(PC) 65/100
The Escapist	(PC) 3.5/5
Slant Magazine	(PC) 2.5/5

The game received "mixed" reviews on all platforms according to the review aggregation website Metacritic. PC Gamer called it "A straightforward cliché that feels out of place in the new wave of cRPGs." IGN said, "Poor creation tools and an aversion to genuine, interesting decision-making keep Sword Coast Legends from succeeding."

The Escapist gave the PC version three-and-a-half stars out of five, calling it "a comfortable return to the D&D rules and universe, but oversimplified combat and a repetitive feel to dungeons and quests keep this game from being great." However, Slant Magazine gave it two-and-a-half stars out of five, saying, "The campaign provided with the package, predictably for a title whose main focus is its editor, remains serviceable but fails to impress." The Digital Fix gave the Xbox One version five out of ten, calling it "a game that loses your interest purely down to the fact that by the time the next map has loaded you've pretty much forgotten why you went there."
