= The Rugrats Movie (video game) =

1998 video game

- Developer: Software Creations
- Publisher: THQ
- Director: Seth Jacobson
- Producers: Trevor Bent; Lorraine Starr
- Designers: Trevor Bent; Simon Hundelby; Troy McColgan
- Programmers: Mike Ager; Brian Beuken
- Artists: James Clarke; Dave Fish; Martin Holland
- Composers: Martin Goodall; Paul Tonge
- Platforms: Game Boy, Game Boy Color
- Release: Game Boy; NA: November 24, 1998; Game Boy Color; EU: April 1, 1999; NA: April 12, 1999
- Genre: Platform game
- Mode: Single-player

The Rugrats Movie is a 1998 platform video game developed by Software Creations and published by THQ. It was released for Game Boy on November 24, 1998, and for Game Boy Color on April 1, 1999 in Europe and April 12, 1999 in North America. It is based on the movie of the same name and the 1991 TV series. Both versions of the game were re-released in 2026 as part of the Rugrats: Retro Rewind Collection compilation.

== Gameplay ==
Tommy Pickles appears during an early level in the Game Boy Color version.

Tommy Pickles' little brother, Dil, has vanished, so the Rugrats set out to find him. The game features eight levels including the Pickles' house, the hospital, woods, and ancient ruins. There are two levels in which the player drives the Reptar Wagon in a top-down perspective, but the rest features standard side-scrolling platform gameplay. In each level the player has to collect specific items and get to the exit before time runs out. The game also utilizes a password feature.

== Development ==
In 1997, THQ signed an agreement with Nickelodeon to develop and publish video games using the Rugrats license through December 2002. The deal gave THQ exclusive rights to Rugrats for all current and future game systems from Nintendo, Sony and Sega. Among the first projects announced as resulting from this deal was a Game Boy title set to be developed by n-Space and released in 1998.

== Reception ==
Reception

Aggregate score
Aggregator	Score
GameRankings	61.75%

Review scores
Publication	Score
AllGame	3/5
Consoles +	84%
EP Daily	5.75/10
Game Informer	2.5/10
GameSpot	7.3/10
IGN	5/10
Jeuxvideo.com	13/20
Nintendo Power	6.9/10
Official Nintendo Magazine	85%
Total Game Boy	87%

The Game Boy Color version has a 61.75 percent score on GameRankings. The Electric Playground praised the graphics and sound of the Game Boy version, but was critical of the gameplay.

Scott Alan Marriott of AllGame rated the Game Boy Color version a 3 out of 5 and wrote, "The Rugrats Movie isn't a classic platform game by any means, but it does what it does admirably, which is to provide a colorful journey through levels based on the 1998 hit movie. And that should be enough to satisfy nearly everyone who saw the film, as this title definitely leans toward a younger audience. Control involves moving left or right and jumping -- that's it." Marriott praised the "entertaining" vehicle levels for adding variety to the game, and also enjoyed its colorful and "well-defined" graphics, writing that "the levels could pass for something you'd see on the Nickelodeon animated television series." Marriott wrote about the sound: "The music is surprisingly catchy, although it does grow repetitive the longer you play the game. The sound effects are ordinary."

Cameron Davis of GameSpot rated the Game Boy Color version a 7.3 out of 10 and wrote that "to the great astonishment of many, it's actually pretty good. Not groundbreaking or innovative in any way, to be sure, but it does what it sets out to do well." Davis said of the game's vehicle levels: "They're a nice addition and break up the gameplay well - a shame, then, that they're over too quickly." Davis praised the game's "well-detailed and extremely colorful locations," but also wrote, "The stages are impressively large and full of hidden areas to explore, although the way the screen sometimes doesn't scroll until you're almost at the edge leads to a few needless deaths. [...] Grown-ups who are brave enough to admit they like watching the cartoon won't find a particularly challenging game here. The fact that the game only uses one button is a good indication of this."

Peer Schneider of IGN gave the Game Boy Color version a 5 out of 10, and did not feel that the game could "hold the attention of older gamers". Schneider wrote, "Graphically, Rugrats stays true to the series with large, recognizable characters and decent animation. The scrolling still needs some work, but Creations pulled off a slew of vibrant, nicely drawn backgrounds that really shine on the Game Boy Color or Super Game Boy. Sound effects are sparse, but the memorable Rugrats music would quickly overshadow any potential sounds anyway. But remember: Enjoy Rugrats music only in small doses. If you're planning to play the game for a long time, we suggest switching off the music to prevent yourself from going nuts."
