= Rugrats: Retro Rewind Collection =

2026 video game

- Cover art, featuring excerpts from the covers of the included games (Note: Clockwise from top left: Rugrats: Studio Tour, Rugrats in Paris: The Movie, Rugrats: Search for Reptar, The Rugrats Movie, Rugrats: Castle Capers, Rugrats: Time Travelers)
- Developer: Limited Run Games
- Publisher: Limited Run Games
- Engine: Carbon Engine
- Platforms: Nintendo Switch; PlayStation 5
- Release: May 15, 2026
- Modes: Single-player, multiplayer

Rugrats: Retro Rewind Collection is a 2026 video game compilation published by Limited Run Games. It includes six games based on the Nickelodeon animated series Rugrats, originally published by THQ between 1998–2001. The compilation was released for Nintendo Switch and PlayStation 5 in May 2026. Upon release, it was met with poor reception by critics.

== Contents ==
Rugrats: Retro Rewind Collection contains six different Rugrats video games, some of which are available in multiple versions originally published for different systems. All games support rewinding gameplay, save states, and optional visual filters. The collection also includes digital scans of the games' original box art and manuals, as well as an in-game music player.

Games in the collection
Title	PS1	Game Boy	GBC	GBA
Rugrats: Search for Reptar	Yes	—N/a	—N/a	—N/a
The Rugrats Movie	—N/a	Yes	Yes	—N/a
Rugrats: Time Travelers	—N/a	—N/a	Yes	—N/a
Rugrats: Studio Tour	Yes	—N/a	—N/a	—N/a
Rugrats in Paris: The Movie	Yes	—N/a	Yes	—N/a
Rugrats: Castle Capers	—N/a	—N/a	—N/a	Yes

== Release ==
Rugrats: Retro Rewind Collection was first announced by Limited Run Games on April 27, 2026. Limited Run had previously worked with Nickelodeon on an original Rugrats game, Rugrats: Adventures in Gameland, two years prior. The collection was released digitally on May 15, 2026. A physical release is set to be released at a later date, including a deluxe edition containing a jewel case for the game, a keychain, stickers, and a soundtrack disc. A physical Game Boy Color cartridge, titled Rugrats Portable Collection, is also planned for release in 2027 and will include all four of the collection's Game Boy and Game Boy Color games.

== Reception ==
Reception

Aggregate scores
Aggregator	Score
Metacritic	(PS5) 54/100 (NS) 40/100
OpenCritic	13% recommend

Review scores
Publication	Score
Nintendo Life	4/10
TechRaptor	4/10
TheGamer	3/5

According to review aggregation website Metacritic, the PlayStation 5 version of Rugrats: Retro Rewind Collection earned mixed reviews from critics, while the Nintendo Switch version was poorly received. Fellow review aggregator OpenCritic assessed that the game received weak approval, being recommended by 13% of critics. Mitch Vogel of Nintendo Life praised the quality of life features provided by the game's emulators, but felt none of the included games had stood the test of time due to their awkward controls and in-game camera systems. William Worrall of TechRaptor noted that some of the games' tutorials were inaccurate, and thought the PlayStation games felt worse to control than their original releases. Josh Coulson of TheGamer considered Search for Reptar the best of the included games, but believed the collection would not appeal to anyone who did not already have nostalgia for the games or franchise.
