= The Rugrats Movie =

1998 animated film

- Theatrical release poster
- Directed by: Norton Virgien; Igor Kovalyov
- Written by: David N. Weiss; J. David Stem
- Based on: Rugrats by Arlene Klasky; Gábor Csupó; Paul Germain
- Produced by: Arlene Klasky; Gábor Csupó
- Starring: E. G. Daily; Tara Strong; Christine Cavanaugh; Kath Soucie; Cheryl Chase; David Spade; Whoopi Goldberg; Margaret Cho; Busta Rhymes; Tim Curry
- Edited by: John Bryant; Kimberly Rettberg
- Music by: Mark Mothersbaugh
- Production companies: Nickelodeon Movies; Klasky Csupo
- Distributed by: Paramount Pictures
- Release dates: November 8, 1998 (Grauman's Chinese Theater); November 20, 1998 (United States)
- Running time: 80 minutes
- Country: United States
- Language: English
- Budget: $24–28 million
- Box office: $141 million

The Rugrats Movie (also known simply as The Rugrats) is a 1998 American animated comedy film based on the Nickelodeon animated television series Rugrats produced by Klasky Csupo. It was directed by Igor Kovalyov and Norton Virgien and was written by David N. Weiss & J. David Stem. The film features the voices of series regulars E. G. Daily, Tara Strong, Christine Cavanaugh, Kath Soucie, Cheryl Chase, Cree Summer, Jack Riley, Melanie Chartoff, Michael Bell, and Joe Alaskey, along with guest stars David Spade, Whoopi Goldberg, Margaret Cho, Busta Rhymes, and Tim Curry.

The film takes place between the events of the series' fifth and sixth seasons. It follows Tommy Pickles as he and the rest of the Rugrats along with his new baby brother, Dil, eventually get lost into the deep wilderness after taking a high-speed ride on the Reptar Wagon. The Rugrats embark on an adventure to find their way home in the forest while being pursued by circus monkeys and a predatory wolf along the way. The Rugrats Movie was the first feature film based on a Nicktoon and is the first in the Rugrats film series.

Plans for a Rugrats film adaptation, along with Ren and Stimpy and Doug, began when Nickelodeon made a contract with 20th Century Fox to produce them. However, the contract ended after Nickelodeon's parent company, Viacom purchased Paramount Pictures' parent company Paramount Communications in 1994. Production then began in 1995 after the television series had restarted following a small hiatus. Series composer Mark Mothersbaugh wrote the film's score.

The Rugrats Movie premiered at Grauman's Chinese Theater on November 8, 1998, and was theatrically released in the United States on November 20, by Paramount Pictures. The film received generally mixed-to-positive reviews from critics, though some criticized its darker tone compared to the television series. It was a box office success, grossing $141 million worldwide. The film was followed by two sequels: Rugrats in Paris: The Movie in 2000 and Rugrats Go Wild in 2003, which is a crossover with another Klasky Csupo series, The Wild Thornberrys.

== Plot ==
Didi Pickles is pregnant with her second baby, which makes her son Tommy worry how that will change the family dynamic. Didi gives birth to a boy, Dil, but upon bringing him home, she and her husband Stu struggle to cope with Dil's constant outbursts, while Tommy struggles to get along with Dil as the latter keeps all of Tommy's toys for himself, but Stu assures him that one day, he will be happy to have Dil as his little brother.

With Dil still causing problems at the Pickles' home, the twins Phil and Lil suggest using the Reptar Wagon Stu has built for a toy contest in Japan to take him back to the hospital. As Tommy and his friend, Chuckie argue with Phil and Lil, Angelica, Tommy's cousin walks in, telling the babies to be quiet. In the process, Dil snatches her Cynthia doll from her. She fights Dil to get the doll back and accidentally kicks the Reptar wagon, which begins to drive away with the babies on board. They speed recklessly through the streets and land in the back of a van, which crashes in the woods. Angelica realizes that Cynthia is missing and ventures out with the family dog Spike to find the babies.

Tommy leads the babies toward a ranger's cabin, believing it to be the home of a magic "lizard" (a mispronunciation of wizard) who can grant their wish to go home. On the way, they encounter monkeys who hijacked a crashed circus train. They kidnap Dil, and Tommy's friends refuse to help rescue him, believing they are better off without him, so Tommy sets off after Dil alone. Meanwhile, the family discovers the babies are missing and sets out to find them in the face of the media sensation that has suddenly generated around their children's disappearance. Angelica's parents Drew and Charlotte arrive and Drew learns from reporter Rex Pester that his brother lost Angelica, causing Drew to attack Stu.

Tommy eventually finds Dil during a storm, but as he struggles to take care of him, Dil continues acting selfishly by drinking all the milk and refusing to share the blanket with Tommy. Tommy loses his temper and furiously prepares to pour Mash Banana baby food onto Dil for the monkeys to take him again, but his rage and the storm scare Dil into behaving himself and his tears cause Tommy to calm down, and the brothers begin bonding. After the storm passes, they reunite with Phil, Lil, and Chuckie, who scare the monkeys off. Angelica recovers her Cynthia doll and reunites with the babies. As they start to cross a damaged bridge, Angelica falls out of the Reptar wagon and hangs through a gap in the bridge above a raging river. They are confronted by the monkeys, only to be scared off by a wolf, who attempts to attack the babies until Spike intervenes and fights the wolf, resulting in them both falling off the bridge.

Stu, looking for the babies in a pterodactyl-like glider, sees them from above and crash lands into the ranger's cabin. Believing he is the "lizard", the babies ask him to bring Spike back instead of going home. Stu falls through the bridge and reveals Spike, who survived the fall by landing in the struts of the bridge. The children are reunited with their parents and return home.

== Voice cast ==
- E. G. Daily as Tommy Pickles
- Tara Strong as Dil Pickles (credited as Tara Charendoff)
- Christine Cavanaugh as Chuckie Finster
- Kath Soucie as Phil, Lil and Betty DeVille
- Cheryl Chase as Angelica Pickles
- Jack Riley as Stu Pickles
- Melanie Chartoff as Didi Pickles and Grandma Minka
- Michael Bell as Drew Pickles, Chas Finster and Grandpa Boris
- Tress MacNeille as Charlotte Pickles
- Philip Proctor as Howard DeVille, Igor
- Joe Alaskey as Grandpa Lou Pickles
- David Spade as Franklin
- Whoopi Goldberg as Margaret
- Tim Curry as Rex Pester
- Hattie Winston as Dr. Lucy Carmichael
- Andrea Martin as Aunt Miriam
- Cree Summer as Susie Carmichael
- Tony Jay as Dr. Lipschitz
- Busta Rhymes as Reptar Wagon
- Roger Clinton Jr. as Air Crewman
- Margaret Cho as Lt. Klavin
- Edie McClurg as Nurse
- Charlie Adler as United Express Driver
- Gregg Berger as Circus TV Announcer
- Abraham Benrubi as Serge
- Frank Welker as Spike, Monkeys, Scar Snout the wolf

Lenny Kravitz, Iggy Pop, Lisa Loeb, Gordon Gano, B-Real, Patti Smith, Jakob Dylan, Phife Dawg, Beck, Lou Rawls, Dawn Robinson, Laurie Anderson, Fred Schneider, Kate Pierson and Cindy Wilson of The B-52's comprised the voices of the singing babies.

== Production ==
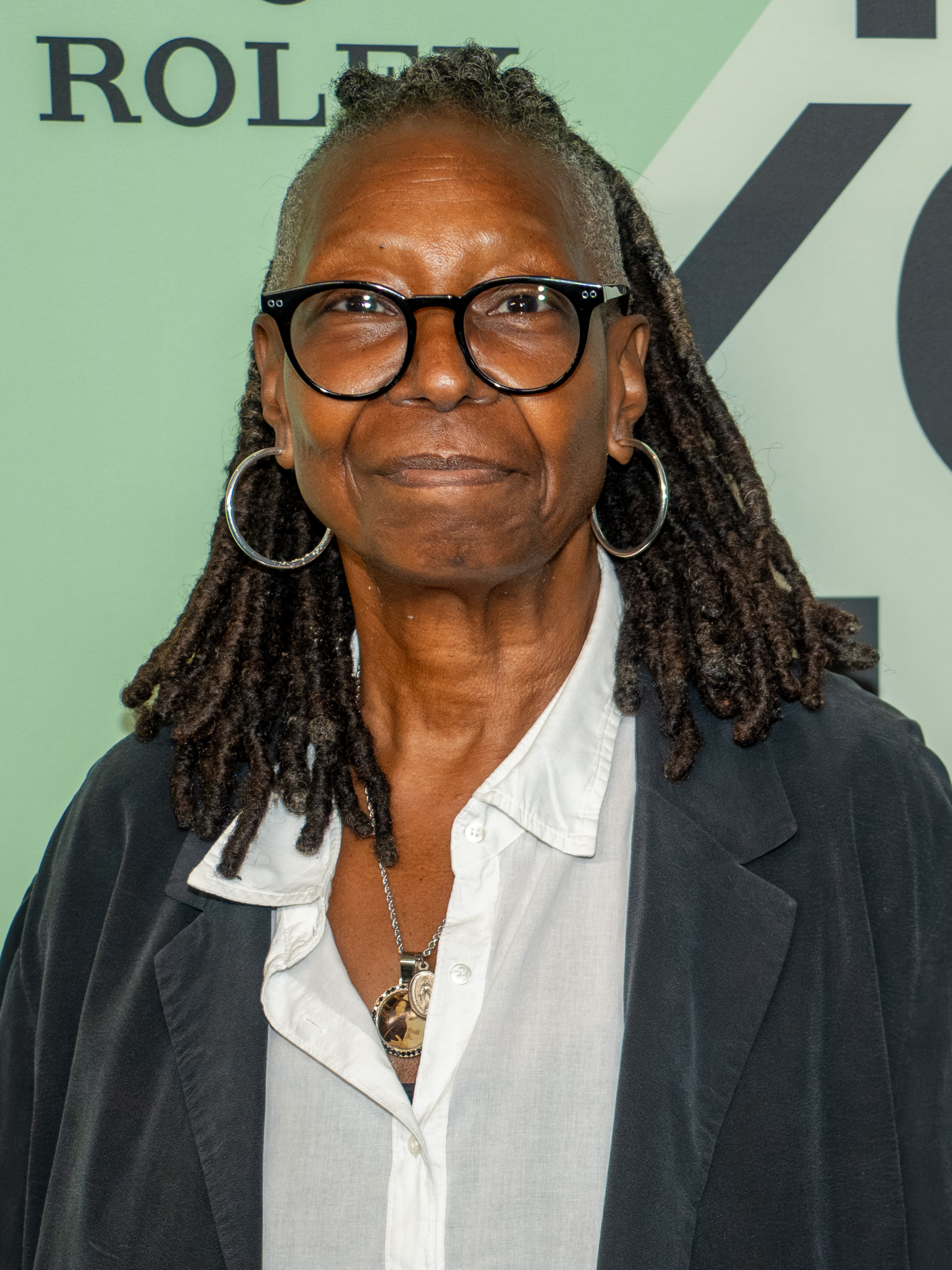
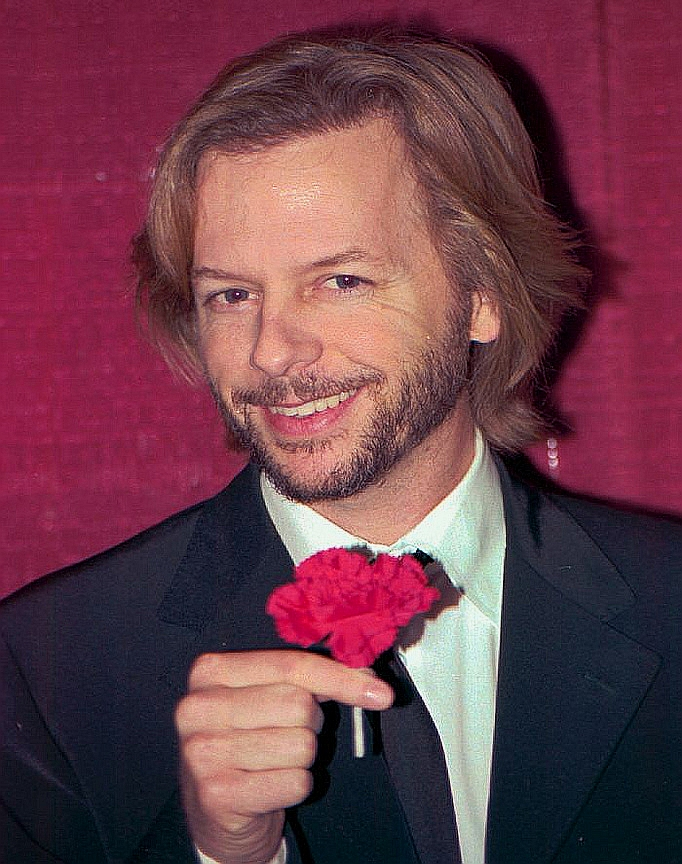
Whoopi Goldberg (left) and David Spade (right) provide the voices of Forest Rangers, Margaret and Frank.

Talks about making Rugrats into a feature film existed since the beginning of the series. The first attempt was in May 1993, when Nickelodeon made a two-year contract deal with 20th Century Fox to produce new material, but an unnamed Nickelodeon executive did not rule out the possibility to make films based on their existing properties, one of those that was proposed was Rugrats, alongside Doug and The Ren & Stimpy Show. However, in February 1994, Nickelodeon's parent company Viacom acquired Paramount Pictures, and Paramount would distribute the films instead. As a result, the contract from Fox expired, with no films produced (although Doug would eventually receive a theatrical film from Walt Disney Pictures in 1999). Production on The Rugrats Movie started a year later in November 1995. The film's voice actors began recording their parts for the movie in late March 1997. Madonna was initially set to voice Dil Pickles, but Tara Strong got the role after her impression of a screaming and crying baby in the audition.

Two months before the release of the movie, an episode prequel titled "The Family Tree" was aired as the penultimate episode of the fifth season. The film's beginning and ending parody Paramount and Lucasfilm's Indiana Jones film series. This later inspired the episode "Okey-Dokey Jones and the Ring of the Sunbeams", which aired during the show's eighth season in 2002.

This film was the first Rugrats production to use digital ink and paint, rather than the traditional cel animation used in the show.

Two songs were cut from the film during production. The first revolves around Stu and Didi in a nightmare sequence where Dr. Lipschitz criticizes their parenting through a song called "When the Baby Cries". The second depicts the Rugrats pushing the Reptar Wagon through the woods, debating what to do about Dil in an army chant style song. Although these scenes were not present in the original theatrical release, nor any home media or streaming releases thereafter, they are shown on CBS and Nickelodeon television airings of the film. These scenes were also present in the print novelization.

== Soundtrack ==
The Rugrats Movie: Music from the Motion Picture

Soundtrack album by Various Artists
- Released: November 3, 1998
- Recorded: 1998
- Genres: R&B, hip hop, pop
- Length: 41:51
- Labels: Interscope, Nickelodeon

Singles from The Rugrats Movie: Music from the Motion Picture
- 1. "Take Me There" Released: February 2, 1999

Professional ratings
Review scores
Source	Rating
Allmusic	link
Entertainment Weekly	C link

The Rugrats Movie: Music from the Motion Picture was released by Interscope Records on November 3, 1998. The enhanced soundtrack contains thirteen tracks, bonus CD-ROM demos, and commercials.

Longtime Rugrats composer Mark Mothersbaugh composed the film's musical score. A new track by English rock musician David Bowie, "(Safe in This) Sky Life", was written for the film's soundtrack but was ultimately removed. The track was re-recorded as a B-side for Bowie's 2002 single "Everyone Says 'Hi'", under the title "Safe".

Amazon.com's Richard Gehr praised the CD for "[bridging] demographics as nimbly as the [original] show itself [did]" and for songs "fans of all ages will love". Entertainment Weekly's David Browne rated the Music From the Motion Picture with a C. Browne noted that, while the soundtrack is enjoyable for children and does "[make] concessions" for parents, adults may dislike the amount of rap. Allmusic's William Ruhlmann reviewed the soundtrack positively, saying "the result" of the singers and songs "is a romp in keeping with the tone of the show and the film".

The Rugrats Movie: Music from the Motion Picture spent twenty six weeks on Billboard 200, peaking at #19.

In honor of its twentieth anniversary, the film's soundtrack was released on vinyl on November 30, 2018.

=== Track listing ===
No.	Title	Artist(s)	Length
1.	"Take Me There"	Blackstreet and Mýa featuring Mase and Blinky Blink	4:02
2.	"I Throw My Toys Around"	No Doubt featuring Elvis Costello	3:02
3.	"This World Is Something New to Me"	Dawn Robinson, Lisa Loeb, B-Real, Patti Smith, Lou Rawls, Laurie Anderson, Gordon Gano, Fred Schneider, Kate Pierson, Cindy Wilson, Phife Dawg, Lenny Kravitz, Beck, Jakob Dylan and Iggy Pop	1:59
4.	"All Day"	Lisa Loeb	3:30
5.	"Dil-A-Bye"	E.G. Daily (with Dialogue by Tara Strong)	3:43
6.	"A Baby is a Gift from a Bob"	Cree Summer & Cheryl Chase	1:57
7.	"One Way or Another"	Cheryl Chase	3:17
8.	"Wild Ride"	Kevi featuring Lisa Stone	2:43
9.	"On Your Marks, Get Set, Ready, Go!"	Busta Rhymes	3:41
10.	"Witch Doctor"	Devo	3:33
11.	"Take the Train"	Rakim and Danny Saber	4:05
12.	"Yo Ho Ho and a Bottle of Yum"	E.G. Daily, Christine Cavanaugh & Kath Soucie	2:18
Total length:			41:51

Japanese edition bonus track
No.	Title	Artist(s)	Length
13.	"Winter's Review"	Shazna	5:25

== Release ==
The Rugrats Movie was first screened at Grauman's Chinese Theater on November 8, 1998. A wide release by Paramount Pictures followed on November 20. The film was released in theaters with a CatDog short titled "Fetch". This short was later broadcast in CatDog episode 21. However, the VHS, DVD, Laserdisc, and Blu-ray releases contain a different CatDog short from episode 28 titled "Winslow's Home Videos".

The film was released in the United Kingdom on March 26, 1999

=== Video games ===
A side-scrolling video game titled The Rugrats Movie was released for Game Boy and Game Boy Color in 1998 and 1999 respectively. It was developed by Software Creations and released by THQ. Broderbund also developed and published a video game based on the film: The Rugrats Movie: Activity Challenge. It was released in September 1998, as part of the film's marketing campaign.

=== Books ===
Several books were released by Simon & Schuster's Simon Spotlight branch and Nickelodeon inspired by The Rugrats Movie. Tommy's New Playmate and The Rugrats Versus the Monkeys were also released on October 1, 1998, authored by Luke David and illustrated by John Kurtz and Sandrina Kurtz.

The Rugrats Movie Storybook, released on the same date and using the same illustrators and publishers, was written by Sarah Wilson. The same date saw the release of The Rugrats Movie: Hang on to Your Diapies, Babies, We're Going In!: Trivia from the Hit Movie!, a trivia book written by Kitty Richards.

A novelization of the film written by Cathy East Dubowski was published on October 1, 1998, by Tandem Library. The following month, a 144-page guidebook, The Making of The Rugrats Movie: Behind the Scenes at Klasky Csupo, was released on November 1, 1998, by MSG. In May 1999, Hal Leonard Publishing Corporation released a book titled The Rugrats Movie.

=== Home media ===
The Rugrats Movie was released on VHS and DVD on March 30, 1999, by Paramount Home Video. The film was also released on Laserdisc on the same day by Pioneer Entertainment. On March 15, 2011, the film was re-released in a three-disc trilogy DVD set alongside its sequels, in honor of Rugrats' 20th anniversary. In addition, it was re-released in some movie sets by Paramount, in 2016 with all the non-sequel Nickelodeon-animated movies up to Barnyard, as well as a separate 2-disc set with Hey Arnold!: The Movie. The film was released on Blu-ray on March 8, 2022, in a trilogy set alongside its sequels.

== Reception ==
=== Box office ===
The Rugrats Movie made $27.3 million in its opening weekend, while averaging about $9,821 per venue from 2,782 theaters, ranking number one that weekend, and beating Enemy of the State. It would be overtaken by A Bug's Life during its second weekend. The film broke the record for the animated feature with the highest opening weekend in November outside of the Thanksgiving holiday and for a non-Disney animated film, both of which were would later be broken by Pokémon: The First Movie.

The film closed April 15, 1999, with a final gross of $101 million from the domestic market, becoming the first non-Disney animated film to gross over $100 million in the United States. With an additional $40 million from its foreign release, The Rugrats Movie grossed over $141 million worldwide, making it the fifth highest-grossing animated film of 1998.

In the United Kingdom, the film topped the country's box office for the next three weekends, before being dethroned by The Faculty.

=== Critical response ===
On Rotten Tomatoes, The Rugrats Movie holds an approval rating of 60% based on 50 reviews, with an average rating of 5.8/10. The website's critics consensus reads: "Charming characters; loads of fun for kids and adults." Metacritic, which uses a weighted average, assigned the film a score of 62 out of 100, based on 20 critics, indicating "generally favorable" reviews. Audiences polled by CinemaScore gave the film an average grade of "A−" on an A+ to F scale.

Roger Ebert gave the film two stars out of four. Ebert wrote that the film's target audience was primarily younger children, and that, while he as an adult disliked it, he "might have" liked it if he were younger and would recommend it for children. The New York Times's Anita Gates reviewed The Rugrats Movie positively, calling it a "delight". Neil Jeffries of Empire gave the film three out of five stars, saying, "Fun for kids, but, despite some adult references, appeal for the over 10s is limited."

Lisa Schwarzbaum of Entertainment Weekly graded the film with a B. Schwarzbaum praised the movie for its appeal to both adult and child audiences, "juxtaposing the blithely self-absorbed parallel universes of small, diapered children and their large, Dockered parents". However, other Entertainment Weekly reviewer Ty Burr gave The Rugrats Movie a B−, criticizing that the film's issues sprung from it being "bigger" than the original series, thus it's having more cultural references, out-of-place CGI scenes, and "[going] into scary territory". Burr did praise the "escaped circus monkeys" for being "scary in a good way", as well as a joke that was accessible to younger audiences.

Rugrats co-creator/co-writer Paul Germain (who, along with the other original writers of Rugrats, left Klasky Csupo in 1993) stated that he felt that the film's writers did not understand the series, and he thought that the scene in the film in which Stu gives a watch to Tommy did not work, as Germain argued that the adults were not supposed to recognize the babies' intelligence. In addition, he disliked that Tommy was given a baby brother because it changed the series from what he intended it to be.

== Sequels ==
The film was followed by the sequels Rugrats in Paris: The Movie in 2000 and Rugrats Go Wild in 2003, the latter of which is a crossover with another Klasky Csupo series, The Wild Thornberrys.
