= Donna Dixon =

American actress (born 1957)

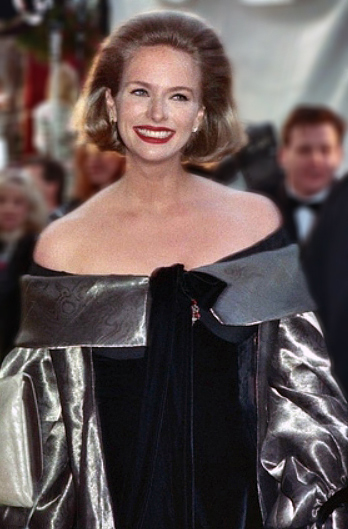
- Dixon in 1990
- Born: Donna Lynn Dixon; July 20, 1957 (age 69); Alexandria, Virginia, US
- Occupations: Actress; model
- Years active: 1980–1997, 2014, 2020
- Spouse: Dan Aykroyd (m. 1983; sep. 2022)
- Children: 3, including Vera Sola

Donna Lynn Dixon (born July 20, 1957) is an American model, pageant winner and former actress. Her acting credits include two seasons as Sonny Lumet in the television show Bosom Buddies and roles in Doctor Detroit (where she met her later husband Dan Aykroyd) and Spies Like Us.

== Biography ==
Dixon was born July 20, 1957, in Alexandria, Virginia.

Dixon began her career as a model and was named Miss Virginia USA in 1976 and Miss District of Columbia World in 1977. She competed in both Miss USA 1976 and Miss World USA 1977.

On television, Dixon portrayed Allison Hayes in the NBC drama Berringer's. She co-starred with Tom Hanks in the early 1980s situation comedy Bosom Buddies, playing the role of Sonny Lumet.

Months after they worked together in the film Doctor Detroit (1983), Dixon and actor Dan Aykroyd married. They later starred together in the films Twilight Zone: The Movie (1983) (though they did not share any scenes), Spies Like Us (1985) and The Couch Trip (1988). Dixon and Aykroyd have three daughters, among whom is singer-songwriter Vera Sola (née Danielle Aykroyd) and actor/model Belle Aykroyd. The couple announced in April 2022 that they were separating after 39 years of marriage, but would remain legally married.

== Filmography ==
Year	Title	Role	Notes
1980–1982	Bosom Buddies	Sonny Lumet	37 episodes
1981	The Love Boat	Dr. Jill McGraw	1 episode
1983	Doctor Detroit	Monica McNeil	
1983	Twilight Zone: The Movie	Jr. Stewardess	(segment "Nightmare at 20,000 Feet")
1985	Spies Like Us	Karen Boyer	
1986	Who's the Boss?	Lauren Sullivan	2 episodes
1987	Moonlighting	Joan Teniwitch	Episode: "Blonde on Blonde"
1988	The Couch Trip	Laura Rollins	
1988	Lucky Stiff	Cynthia Mitchell	
1989	Speed Zone (also known as Cannonball Run III)	Tiffany	
1989	It Had to Be You	Dede	
1992	Wayne's World	Dreamwoman	
1994	Exit to Eden	Bonnie	
1995	The Nanny	Monica Baker	Episode: "Having His Baby"
1995	Nixon	Maureen Dean	
2014	Da Sweet Blood of Jesus	Ms. Blair	
2020	The Twilight Zone	Meghan #2 (voice)	Episode: "You Might Also Like"

Preceded by Linda McKee	Miss Virginia USA; 1976	Succeeded by Lynn Herring
Preceded by Rhonda L. Koch	Miss District of Columbia World; 1977	Succeeded by Gloria Renfrow
