= Rugrats: Castle Capers =

2001 video game

- North American cover art
- Developer: Software Creations
- Publisher: THQ
- Programmer: Mike Ager
- Platform: Game Boy Advance
- Release: NA: September 25, 2001; EU: November 9, 2001
- Genre: Platform
- Mode: Single-player

Rugrats: Castle Capers is a single-player platform game developed by Software Creations and published by THQ and was released only for the Game Boy Advance, based on the Rugrats cartoon series. The story revolves around the Rugrats, who must retrieve their toys from Angelica after she steals them, imagining herself to be queen of a newly constructed playground set. Gameplay is very similar to the gameplay of Rugrats: Royal Ransom and shares the same plot, released a year later. The game was re-released in 2026 as part of the Rugrats: Retro Rewind Collection compilation.

== Reception ==
Rugrats: Castle Capers received generally positive feedback from critics upon release, with GamingTarget giving the game an 8.5 out of 10, and GameVortex stating that while it may not be the most mature or genre breaking game, "it's fun - even if you aren't a fan of the show."
