= N-Space =

Defunct American video game developer

n-Space Inc.
- Industry: Video games
- Founded: 1993; 33 years ago
- Defunct: March 29, 2016
- Fate: Closed
- Headquarters: Orlando, Florida, US
- Key people: Erick S. Dyke (president and co-founder); Dan O'Leary (co-founder); Sean Purcell (co-founder)
- Number of employees: 60+ (2012)
- Website: n-space.com (archived)

n-Space Inc. was an American video game developer founded in 1993 by Erick S. Dyke, Dan O'Leary, and Sean Purcell. It developed games on nearly a dozen different platforms, but was mostly focused on Nintendo consoles and handhelds in particular since 2001. The game Geist was a second-party project, developed in cooperation with Nintendo. In March 2016, it was announced that n-Space had closed down for unknown reasons.

== History ==
n-Space founders Erick S. Dyke and Sean Purcell met while working at General Electric Aerospace (now part of Lockheed Martin) to create advanced military simulators. In 1991, GE Aerospace began to explore the possibility of using its 3D technology for commercial applications. This led to a series of contracts with Sega for the development of the Model 1 and Model 2 arcade boards. Dyke, O’Leary, and Purcell spent two months working with Sega in Japan to complete the development of one of the first Model 2 arcade titles, Desert Tank. The trio worked with director Hiroshi Kataoka and the head of the Sega AM2 division, Yu Suzuki. In 1993, Dyke, O’Leary, and Purcell founded n-Space with funding from Sony Computer Entertainment of America to develop games on the newly launched Sony PlayStation console.

The first project the company commissioned was RazorWing, which was produced in association with the original product development division of Sony Computer Entertainment America (which was later absorbed into the larger Sony Imagesoft and was renamed to Sony Interactive Studios America), but it was cancelled before release. n-Space launched their first released video game in 1997 for PlayStation, TigerShark, using the engine that was intended for RazorWing. The company later received funding for Nintendo, that the company was given a contract to develop games for the GameCube and Wii and saw an increase in developers.

In 2011, n-Space announced their largest project yet: developing an all-new property from the ground-up, made exclusively for the Nintendo 3DS in cooperation with Square Enix. This property is Heroes of Ruin and was launched in June 2012. In 2015, n-Space released their first independent title, Sword Coast Legends, with Digital Extremes. It is a role-playing game set within the Dungeons & Dragons universe. On March 29, 2016, it was announced that n-Space had closed down, 23 years after its founding.

== Games developed ==
Year	Title	Publisher	Platforms
1997	TigerShark	GT Interactive	Windows, PlayStation
1997	Bug Riders: The Race of Kings	GT Interactive	Windows, PlayStation
1998	Duke Nukem: Time to Kill	GT Interactive	PlayStation
1998	Rugrats: Search for Reptar	THQ	PlayStation
1999	Rugrats: Studio Tour	THQ	PlayStation
2000	Die Hard Trilogy 2: Viva Las Vegas	FOX Interactive	Windows, PlayStation
2000	Danger Girl	THQ	PlayStation
2000	Duke Nukem: Land of the Babes	Infogrames	PlayStation
2000	Mary-Kate and Ashley: Magical Mystery Mall	Acclaim	PlayStation
2001	Mary-Kate and Ashley: Crush Course	Acclaim	Windows, PlayStation
2002	Mary-Kate and Ashley: Sweet 16 – Licensed to Drive	Acclaim	GameCube, PlayStation 2
2005	Geist	Nintendo	GameCube
2005	GoldenEye: Rogue Agent	EA Games	Nintendo DS
2007	Winx: Join the Club	Konami	PlayStation Portable
2007	Call of Duty 4: Modern Warfare	Activision	Nintendo DS
2008	Star Wars: The Force Unleashed	LucasArts	Nintendo DS
2008	Call of Duty: World at War	Activision	Nintendo DS
2008	Target Toss Pro: Bags	Incredible Technologies	WiiWare
2008	Hue Pixel Painter	Activision	Nintendo DS
2009	Hannah Montana: The Movie	Disney Interactive	Xbox 360, Nintendo DS, Wii, PlayStation 3
2009	Marvel: Ultimate Alliance 2	Activision	Nintendo DS, Wii, PlayStation 2
2009	Carnival King	Incredible Technologies	WiiWare
2009	Star Wars Battlefront: Elite Squadron	LucasArts	Nintendo DS
2009	Call of Duty: Modern Warfare – Mobilized	Activision	Nintendo DS
2010	Toy Story 3	Disney Interactive	Nintendo DS
2010	Target Toss Pro: Lawn Darts	Incredible Technologies	WiiWare
2010	007: Blood Stone	Activision	Nintendo DS
2010	Goldeneye 007	Activision	Nintendo DS
2010	Golf Cart Ranger	N-Space	iOS
2010	Call of Duty: Black Ops	Activision	Nintendo DS
2010	Tron: Evolution – Battle Grids	Disney Interactive	Nintendo DS, Wii
2011	Call of Duty: Modern Warfare 3: Defiance	Activision	Nintendo DS
2011	Jillian Michaels' Fitness Adventure	Majesco	Xbox 360/Kinect
2011	Jaws: Ultimate Predator	Majesco	Nintendo 3DS
2012	5 Micro Lab Challenge	Microsoft Studios	Xbox 360/Kinect
2012	Heroes of Ruin	Square Enix	Nintendo 3DS
2012	RollerCoaster Tycoon 3D	Atari	Nintendo 3DS
2012	Skylanders: Giants	Activision	Nintendo 3DS
2013	Skylanders: Swap Force	Activision	Nintendo 3DS
2014	Suits and Swords	Sony Pictures Television	iOS, Android
2015	WWE 2K Mobile	2K Games	iOS, Android
2015	Sword Coast Legends	Digital Extremes	Windows, Linux, Mac, PlayStation 4, Xbox One

=== Cancelled ===
Title	Publisher	Platform
RazorWing	SCEA	PlayStation
Austin Powers: Oh, Behave!	Rockstar Games	PlayStation 2
Dexter's Laboratory: Extreme Robot Rumble	BAM! Entertainment	PlayStation 2
Duke Nukem D-Day	GT Interactive	PlayStation 2
Mary-Kate and Ashley in Action!	Acclaim Entertainment	PlayStation 2
Fear (Geist)	None	Xbox (moved to the Gamecube)
Winter	None	Wii
Sphere	Nintendo	Wii
Haggar (Halo Mega Bloks Game)	None	Xbox 360
