= The Rugrats Movie: Activity Challenge =

1998 video game

- Developer: Broderbund
- Publisher: Broderbund
- Platforms: Windows; Mac OS
- Release: September 1998 (Note: other sources say October 1998)
- Genre: Educational
- Mode: Single-player

The Rugrats Movie: Activity Challenge is a 1998 educational video game developed and published by Broderbund. It is based on The Rugrats Movie.

== Gameplay ==
The Rugrats Movie Activity Challenge is an educational game where players relive scenes as Tommy Pickles and his friends try to rescue his baby brother, Dil Pickles. The game blends moments from the film with logic and typing challenges aimed at children. Gameplay consists of six distinct mini-games, each offering ten levels across three difficulty settings—easy, medium, and hard—totaling 180 levels. The game includes voice acting and recognizable graphics drawn from the TV show. Players can revisit completed levels by clicking on their medallions.

== Development ==
The Rugrats Movie: Activity Challenge was showcased at E3 1998.

== Reception ==
Reception

Review scores
Publication	Score
All Game Guide	3.5/5
MacHome Journal	4/5
Dayton Daily News	A+

All Game Guide said "Somewhere, the fun factor got lost, turning what could have been an excellent game into one that is only a little better than average".

MacHome Journal said "Sound effects and the kids’ dialogue are both wonderful, and the variety in the games in the Activity Challenge ensures that kids will be captivated by at least one game, if not more. Very few kids (or adults) that I know can resist these adventuresome babies".

Rugrats Movie: Activity Challenge ranked 12th on PC Data's list of Top-Selling Software for December 1998. It also ranked 3rd on PC Data's list of Top-Selling Home Education Software for the week of April 4 to 10 in 1999.
