= Jim McKrell =

American actor

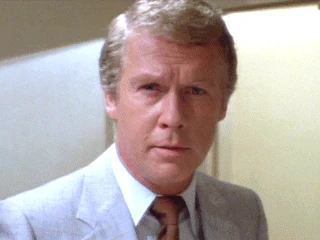
- McKrell in The Howling (1981)
- Born: James MacKrell; October 12, 1937 (age 88); Little Rock, Arkansas, United States
- Occupation: Actor
- Years active: 1969–2016
- Spouse: Cathy MacKrell
- Children: 4

James McKrell (October 12, 1937, also written MacKrell), sometimes known on-air as Jimmy Kaye, is a retired American actor, radio host, and television personality, best known for hosting television game shows such as Celebrity Sweepstakes and The Game Game and appearing in films and television throughout the late 1970s and 1980s, including Gremlins.

== Career ==
=== Show business ===
Jim McKrell was born in Little Rock, Arkansas on October 12, 1937. His father Rev. James K. "Uncle Mac" MacKrell, Sr. was a radio personality on KCUL radio station in Fort Worth, Texas.

McKrell's career in broadcasting spanned five decades, beginning in the 1970s. Among his notable appearances were hosting the shows Celebrity Sweepstakes, The Game Game and Quiz Kids. He was also the presenter for the game shows Sweethearts and Couch Potatoes.

Additionally, McKrell acted in films and television, including Annie Hall, Defending Your Life, Semi-Tough, Teen Wolf, Harry's War, and several made-for-TV movies. McKrell played reporter Lew Landers in two Joe Dante films, The Howling and Gremlins. He had many guest roles on television, such as in Dallas, Soap, Moonlighting and The Golden Girls. McKrell had regular appearances on General Hospital, Capitol, Generations and Days of Our Lives.

McKrell was also a semi-prolific advertiser. He became a corporate spokesman for Chevrolet and Disney, and he appeared in advertisements for Whirlpool, Serta, Goodyear, Mattel, Oster, Radio Shack, Entex, Toyota, Exxon, Xerox, Shell, and Coca-Cola as well as television informercials. For 14 years, McKrell hosted the National Easter Seals Telethon, and he wrote and produced several projects for ACTA Communications in Chicago.

McKrell also worked in radio. His credits include KMPC and KFI in Los Angeles, WMEX in Boston, WNOE in New Orleans, KBOX in Dallas, KXOL in Fort Worth (where he worked with longtime friend George Carlin), and WFUN Miami. He hosted his own talk show in Houston, Texas on KKTL, and was a news anchor at KHTV Channel 39.

=== Later career and retirement ===
Later in his career, McKrell took increasing roles in voiceover projects, including in the film Imps*. In 2009, he published the novel Down from the Mountain: the Story of Bandit and the Wolf, which received positive critical response.

In 2016, McKrell played the lead role in the film Last Man Club. His performance received particular praise, and for it, he won the Best Actor - Feature Award at the Action on Film International Film Festival. Following the film, McKrell ostensibly retired from show business.

== Personal life ==
McKrell now lives near Conroe, Texas.
