= Rugrats: Time Travelers =

1999 video game

- Developer: Software Creations
- Publisher: THQ
- Programmers: Dave Stead; Mike Ager; Danny Whelan
- Composers: Martin Goodall; Paul Tonge
- Series: Rugrats
- Platform: Game Boy Color
- Release: NA: October 27, 1999
- Genre: Platform game
- Mode: Single-player

Rugrats: Time Travelers (spelled as Rugrats: Time Travellers in PAL regions) is a 1999 platform game developed by Software Creations Limited and published by THQ, Inc. for the Game Boy Color. It was released on October 27, 1999, in North America. It is the second game based on the Nickelodeon animated television series Rugrats to release for the system and the first Game Boy Color-exclusive title. Its plot follows the Rugrats characters traversing over 10 levels via a time machine found in a toy store. The game was re-released in 2026 as part of the Rugrats: Retro Rewind Collection compilation.

== Summary ==
Chuckie Finster during a mine cart section of the game.

The plot involves the Rugrats time-traveling to the 1800s goldmine, Ancient Egypt, the Wild West, the sunken city of Atlantis, the prehistoric era, a medieval castle, a fairytale land, an island of pirates, a circus, and outer space. The game starts with Chuckie as the only playable character, in the Toy Palace level. After rescuing Tommy, Phil, Lil, Angelica and Dil in their respective levels, they then become additional playable characters.

== Reception ==
Reception

Aggregate score
Aggregator	Score
GameRankings	56%

Review scores
Publication	Score
AllGame	2.5/5
IGN	3/10
Nintendo Power	5.8/10

The game was met with very mixed reception, as GameRankings gave it a score of 56%.

IGN gave the game a rating of 3 out of 10 and said, "It's just a frustrating and very, very average game. Kids may like the big graphics in the game, they won't get much gameplay out of it, and they probably will never see some of the funnier scenes. Buy your own rugrat a Rugrats video instead." AllGame gave it two-and-a-half stars out of five, saying, "Rugrats: Time Travelers looks and sounds great, but its gameplay is limited and drearily repetitive. Ultimately, it's yet another mediocre 2D side-scrolling platform game." Nintendo Power rated it a 5.8, writing that its "graphics are excellent, but the platform action is repetitive, simplistic, and not very creative." Pockett Magazine gave it 2 stars out of 5.
