= Rugrats: Search for Reptar =

1998 video game

- North American box art
- Developer: n-Space
- Publisher: THQ
- Series: Rugrats
- Platform: PlayStation
- Release: NA: Q4 1998; PAL: November 1998
- Genre: Platform
- Modes: Single-player, multiplayer

Rugrats: Search for Reptar is a 1998 platform video game developed by n-Space and published by THQ. It was released in North America in the last quarter of 1998 and the PAL region in November 1998, exclusively for the PlayStation. Based on the television show Rugrats, the game follows the show's main character, Tommy Pickles, who has lost pieces of his Reptar puzzle and seeks to find them. It features stages based on episodes from the television show and minigames. Its sequel is Rugrats: Studio Tour (1999).

The game was developed with the intent of appealing to children. A marketing campaign, the second-biggest for a video game in 1998, was formed in conjunction with Sony Computer Entertainment America and THQ for the North American release to bolster the children's market on the PlayStation. Reviews were mixed, praising the graphics and entertainment value among children, but criticizing the camera and control mechanics. It was the third-best-selling game in the first two weeks of its release and sold nearly 1.5 million copies in the US and was incorporated into Sony Interactive Entertainment's Greatest Hits brand.

== Gameplay and premise ==
Chuckie is one of the playable characters in the game. The milk bottle in the bottom right corner depicts the player's health

The game features three play modes: a training mode, the main storyline, and an activities menu. The training mode provides instructions on how to play while the player controls Tommy Pickles, the main character of the animated children's television series Rugrats. The activities menu provides access to minigames and tasks within the game for the player to select.

The main storyline follows Tommy, who has lost pieces of a jigsaw puzzle featuring the cartoon dinosaur Reptar. It is a single-player 3D platform game in which the player controls several main characters from the television show to accomplish various goals.

The game has fourteen levels that players initiate by picking up certain objects. Levels can be played in any order, but some are unlocked by completing earlier tasks. The levels that players explore are mostly based on episodes from the series and contain pieces of the Reptar puzzle that players collect. Upon completing the main storyline, a golf minigame can be accessed; it supports up to four players.

== Development and release ==
In 1997, THQ signed an agreement with Nickelodeon to develop and publish video games using the Rugrats license through December 2002. The deal gave THQ exclusive rights to use Rugrats for all current and future game systems from Nintendo, Sony, and Sega and stipulated that n-Space would develop the video games.

Rugrats: Search for Reptar was developed to appeal to children ages seven to twelve and fans of the television series. It featured level ideas inspired by television episodes and voice actors from the cartoon who reprised their roles, including E. G. Daily as Tommy Pickles, Kath Soucie as Phil and Lil, Christine Cavanaugh as Chuckie Finster, and Cheryl Chase as Angelica Pickles.

THQ created a multimillion-dollar marketing campaign for Search for Reptar, the second-biggest of 1998 for a video game after The Legend of Zelda: Ocarina of Time. Marketing included television and print advertisements, promotional tie-ins (including images of the game on Rugrats Fruit Snacks' boxes), and online advertisements. A trailer for the game was included in PlayStation Interactive Sampler Vol. 8, a demo disk distributed by Sony to promote various video games. Demos were distributed through kiosks, hardware pack-ins, and PlayStation: The Official Magazine demo disks. The campaign took about a year to formulate and was a collaboration between Sony Computer Entertainment America and THQ to expand the children's market on the PlayStation. It was one of two THQ games to have television advertisements at the time, the other being WCW/nWo Thunder.

The game was released in North America in the last quarter of 1998 (Note: Sources give differing dates for the game's release, including October 31, November 16, November 23, and December 1998.) and received an "E" rating from the Entertainment Software Rating Board, indicating it was appropriate for "Everyone". It was released in PAL regions in November. From March to May 1999, the game was one of five involved in the "Gimme Five" promotion, a campaign by Sony and General Mills that distributed $5 discount coupons toward select PlayStation titles through six leading General Mills breakfast cereals. In November 1999, the game was declared one of Sony Interactive Entertainment's "Greatest Hits" titles, indicating that it was one of the highest-selling games for the platform, and subsequently re-released under that label. The game was followed by a sequel titled Rugrats: Studio Tour (1999). The game was re-released in 2026 as part of the Rugrats: Retro Rewind Collection compilation.

== Reception ==
Reception

Review scores
Publication	Score
AllGame	3/5
Electronic Gaming Monthly	4.5/10, 8/10, 6.5/10, 7/10
GameSpot	6.5/10
IGN	6.5/10
Entertainment Weekly	B+

Reviewers stated that the game had an easy difficulty rating appealing to a younger audience, and the short duration of the levels and minigames prevented them from becoming bored. For older players, reviewers said that fans of the television show or casual gamers could enjoy the game, but might lose interest after quickly mastering the mechanics. The golf minigame was highlighted as a positive aspect.

Reviewers commented on poor camera mechanics, stating that the camera's movement was nauseating, the button to reorient the camera was not always effective and sometimes entering a room caused the camera angle to reverse controls. Some highlighted positive experiences with the controls, while others critiqued poor reaction times with initiating character actions or stopping the character's movement. The graphics were highlighted as a positive aspect, although the textures were described as a "little ropey" by Neil Houghton in his review for Station Magazine. Doug Perry, writing for IGN, stated that the game's use of simple Gouraud shading, similar to those used in the television show, was visually appealing. The looping, circus music soundtrack received a positive reception from reviewers. Scott Alan Marriott, writing for AllGame, stated that fans of the television show would be attracted to the game's use of the same voice actors.

Search for Reptar was the third best-selling game in its first two weeks of release in North America. In December 1998, it was the fourteenth best-selling home console video game in the United States. It was the fifth-highest selling PlayStation game in the first two weeks of February 1999, dropping to the twentieth-highest selling PlayStation game three months later. As of June 2003, the game had sold 1.5 million copies.
