= Rugrats: Royal Ransom =

2002 video game

- North American PS2 cover art
- Developer: Avalanche Software
- Publisher: THQ
- Producers: Lalie; Carolina Beruza
- Platforms: PlayStation 2; GameCube
- Release: November 26, 2002
- Genres: Action-adventure, platformer
- Modes: Single-player, multiplayer

Rugrats: Royal Ransom is an action-adventure game developed by Avalanche Software and published by THQ for the PlayStation 2 and GameCube. The game was released on November 26, 2002, and is based on the Rugrats television series, which aired from 1991 to 2004 on Nickelodeon. The game's plot is loosely based on Rugrats: Castle Capers.

== Plot ==
Tommy's father, Stu Pickles, invents what he calls the Play Palace 3000, which is a giant expanding tower filled with rooms for the children to play in. Stu leaves to go buy the finishing touches, duct tape and paperclips, and asks Lou to watch the kids. But as always, Lou falls asleep. The babies begin to play on the Play Palace 3000, but Kimi notices that Angelica is at the top of the tower. Angelica assumes control of the palace as queen and steals the babies' toys to force them to obey her. Chuckie immediately submits at first, but Tommy convinces him and the others to climb the tower to retrieve their belongings.

After reaching the top tower and fighting Angelica, the babies successfully defeat her and force her out on a slide and into a mud pit. With Angelica deposed, the babies can now peacefully play in the Play Palace 3000 all they want.

== Gameplay ==
Tommy, Chuckie, Phil, Lil, and Kimi are playable characters. The Play Palace 3000 is divided into nine levels, with each one further divided into sections. The player is typically tasked with finding items and playing mini-games in order to advance. New levels are unlocked by collecting batteries. Money can be collected to unlock new characters, as well as new mini-games.

== Reception ==
Reception

Review score
Publication	Score
X-Play	(PS2) 2/5

Shane Satterfield of Extended Play gave the PlayStation 2 version a rating of 2 out of 5, and wrote that the game's characters "all control exactly the same and have the same abilities. And that's not saying much because they do very little. [...] Despite the fact that there are just three moves to perform, the jumping mechanism is difficult to come to grips with and a plethora of invisible walls makes navigating the environments a chore. [...] The simple minigames will please the young ones, and they give the game a sense of variety, but they're far too simple for parents to appreciate."

Satterfield praised the character animations, but wrote that, "The environments are incredibly simple and feature textures that repeat constantly. While you have free control of the camera, it rarely cooperates with your commands and the default angle shows far too much of the ground and not enough of the terrain in front of you. When you do try to get a good look at the environments, the graphics engine slows to a crawl and teeters on the edge of crashing." Satterfield concluded that the game's "erratic jumping controls and annoying camera issues will ensure that even the little ones will become frustrated."
