= Rugrats: Studio Tour =

1999 video game

- North American cover art
- Developer: n-Space
- Publisher: THQ
- Producer: Bob Hichborn
- Designer: Bob Hichborn
- Programmers: Sean Purecell; Kathleen Kappers
- Artist: Stacy Schulstrom Roth
- Composers: Mark Mothersbaugh; Mutato Muzika; Gene M. Rozenberg
- Series: Rugrats
- Platform: PlayStation
- Release: NA: November 9, 1999; EU: December 15, 1999
- Genre: Action-adventure
- Modes: Single-player, multiplayer

Rugrats: Studio Tour is a 1999 action-adventure game developed by n-Space and published by THQ. It was released for PlayStation on November 9, 1999, in North America and on December 15, 1999, in Europe. It is based on the Nickelodeon animated television series Rugrats. The game was re-released in 2026 as part of the Rugrats: Retro Rewind Collection compilation.

== Plot ==
While on a trip to a movie studio, Tommy, Chuckie, Phil, Lil, Angelica, Susie, and Dil venture away from the grownups. In the process, the security guard loses the keys to a security door thanks to Dil, whom he accidentally locks up, forcing the others to venture throughout the studio and explore various film sets in search of the keys to free Dil from an adventure film set before he is harmed by the props.

== Gameplay ==
Gameplay during the mini-golf segment of the game.

The player chooses from five available attractions in the search for keys, including:

- Captain Cookies: A pirate-themed attraction where the player controls Angelica. Treasure hunting, mini-golf, tag, and footracing games are included. The title is a reference to Captain Cook.
- Lazy Saddles: A Western-themed attraction where the player controls Susie. The levels here involve collecting gold in a mine, rounding up farm animals, mini-golf, and a shooting gallery. The title is a pun on the movie Blazing Saddles.
- Outside Space: A space-themed attraction where the player controls Chuckie. It includes a series of platforming levels, a Moon exploration, and a shooting gallery.
- Diapies of Thunder: A racing-themed attraction where the player controls Phil. The levels here are all racetracks that require a certain number of laps to be completed and the races to be won overall. The attraction name is a reference to the film Days of Thunder.

Once the player completes a level in any of the attractions, they are awarded with a key. A key is also rewarded if the player collects enough Reptar bars. Once the player collects enough keys, they can open the door.

Once the player opens the door, they go into three more scenes:

- Shirley-Lock Holmes: Players play as Angelica who acts as Shirley-Lock Holmes, a pun on Sherlock Holmes. In the first part of the game, they have to collect four green keys around the graveyard to open the mansion's front door. Once inside, they have to play with two buttons that will move platforms so that they can get to the final door upstairs.
- Okey Dokey Jones: This scene is a pun on Indiana Jones. Players play as Tommy to pass obstacles in a sidescroller game. It is very similar to "Zero Gees", but Tommy is not equipped with a zapper and has no booster jump power-up.
- Reptar Park: This is the final scene of the game, with the title being a pun to Jurassic Park. Players control a Reptar Wagon to escape Reptar. The scene divided into three parts. In the first part, only Tommy and Angelica are in the wagon. In the second part, Phil and Lil will join followed by Chuckie and Susie in the third and final part. Once players finish this scene they can watch the ending cutscene of the game.

== Reception ==
Reception

Review scores
Publication	Score
AllGame	2.5/5
Consoles +	30%
Absolute Playstation	70%

Cal Nguyen of AllGame rated the game two and a half stars out of five, and compared it to Rugrats: Search for Reptar, writing, "It's basically the same game in a newer arena." Nguyen criticized the "clumsy controls" and "frustrating" gameplay, as well as the game's map, which only fills itself out as the player progresses. While Nguyen criticized the game's "average" graphics, he also considered them to be a slight improvement from Rugrats: Search for Reptar. Nguyen wrote that the mini-golf games were "probably the only tolerable levels in the game." However, Nguyen praised the game's variety, sound effects, and music, and called the voiceovers "superb, even though they are a bit annoying." The News-Press called the game "dull and confusing".
