= Karen Strassman =

American actress

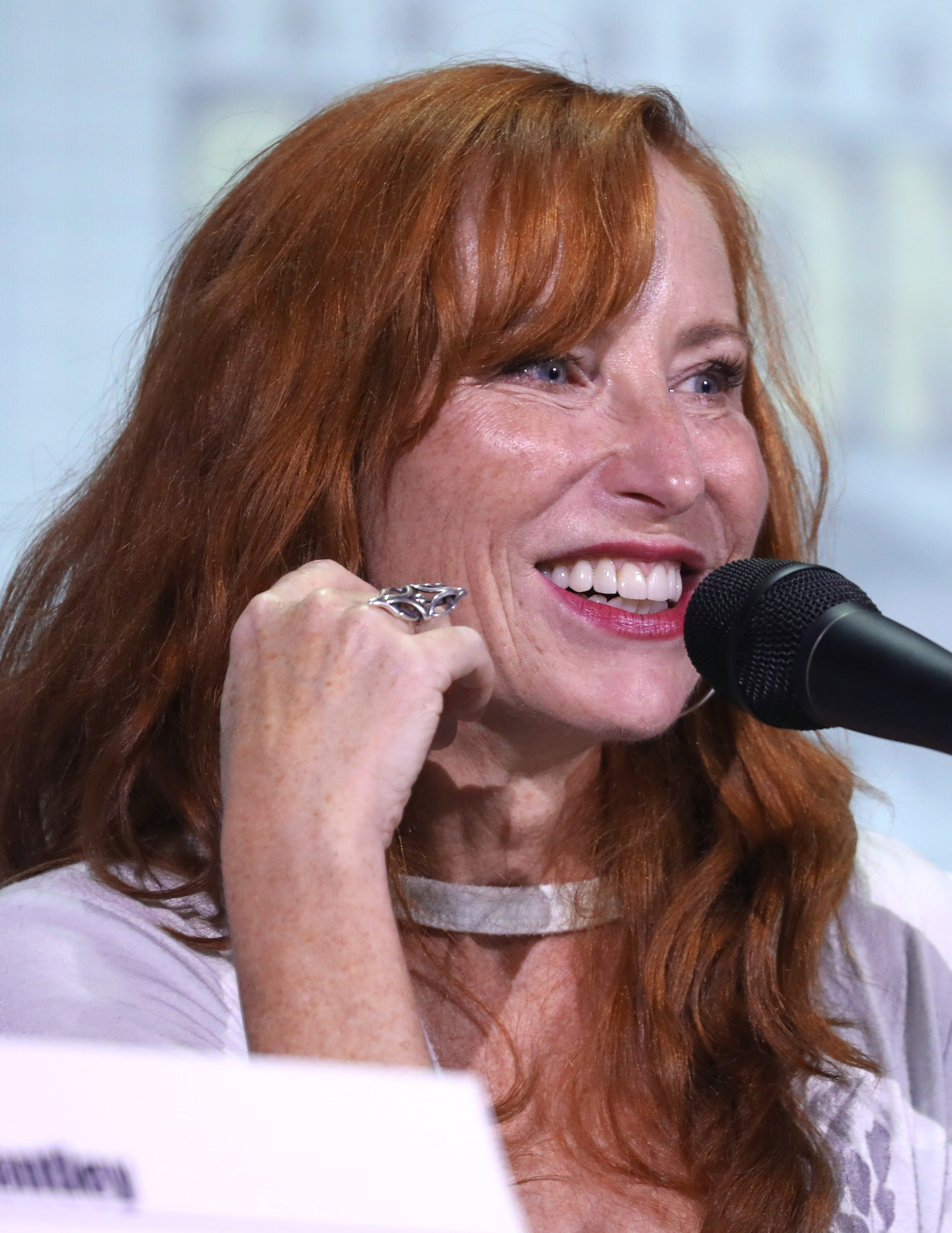
- Strassman at the 2023 San Diego Comic-Con
- Born: Washington, D.C., U.S.
- Other names: Kirsty Pape; Mia Bradly
- Occupation: Actress
- Years active: 1992–present
- Website: www.karenstrassman.com

Karen Strassman is an American actress who has provided English language voices for Japanese anime shows, animation, and video games. Some of her major roles are Kallen Stadtfeld in the Code Geass series, Miyuki Takara in Lucky Star, Nina Fortner in Monster, Rider in Studio Deen's Fate/stay night, Suigintou the first Rozen Maiden doll in Rozen Maiden, Sawako Yamanaka in K-On!, Sola-Ui Nuada-Re Sophia-Ri in Fate/Zero, Momo Hinamori and Soi Fon in Bleach, as well as Sky in the Shantae series and Rouge the Bat in the Sonic the Hedgehog series.

In live-action productions, she portrayed Jolene in the television show Weeds.

== Early life and education ==
Strassman enjoyed acting at a young age, and was involved in school plays. When she was 20, she had moved to France to study psychology and theatre at CNSAD in Paris.

== Career ==
In an interview with Slink FM, she said she picked psychology as a ways to earn a living in case theatre did not pan out. While there, she saw an advertisement calling for actors who could speak English. She got an apprenticeship with Studio VO/VF where she trained as a dialect coach. After a year, she was offered a paid position where she trained older French actors on how to act in English. She also taught kids, where she was recruited by two women who produced a magazine called Hi-Kids which would produce audio cassettes. It was there where she started doing voice-over.

She would later do French and English dubs, and got into video game voice-over. She provided voice over work in French for Air France, Euro-star, Disneyland Paris, and for audio tours of The Louvre and the Musée d'Orsay. As a dialect coach, she worked with Lancôme advertising.

== Personal life ==
Strassman is a naturalized French citizen; she is also fluent in French.

== Filmography ==
=== Anime ===
List of voice performances in anime
Year	Title	Role	Notes	Source
2001–02	Funny Little Bugs			
2002	Rurouni Kenshin	Itsuko Katsu		Resume
2002	Great Teacher Onizuka	Mizuki Yokoyama, Naoko Izumi		Resume
2002	Cosmo Warrior Zero	Helmatier		Resume
2002	I My Me! Strawberry Eggs	Miho's Mother, Teacher, Jun Ohmono, Girl in Car		Resume
2002	Babel II – Beyond Infinity	Ryoko Kirishima		Resume
2002–03	X	Satsuki Yatouji		Resume
2003	Chobits	Yuzuki		Resume
2003	Gun Frontier	Sinunora	As Kirsty Pape	Resume
2003	Mirage of Blaze	Maiko Asaoko	As Mia Bradly	Resume
2003	Heat Guy J	Phia Oliveira, others	As Mia Bradly	Resume
2003	The Twelve Kingdoms	Yuka Sugimoto	As Kirsty Pape	Resume
2003	The Big O	Various characters		Resume
2003	Haibane Renmei	Nemu	As Kirsty Pape	Resume
2003	Figure 17	Orudina	As Mia Bradly	Resume
2003	Witch Hunter Robin	Various characters		Resume
2003	Last Exile	Delphine Eraclea	As Mia Bradly	
2003	Wild Arms: Twilight Venom	Maiden		Resume
2003	Ai Yori Aoshi	Mayu Miyuki, others	Also Enishi	Resume
2003	Please Teacher!	Konoha Edajima		Resume
2004	Space Pirate Captain Herlock: The Endless Odyssey	Mimeh	As Mia Bradly	Resume
2004	Texhnolyze	Servant	as Kirsty Pape	Resume
2004	Marmalade Boy	Suzu Sakuma	As Mia Bradly	Resume
2004	Angel Tales	Yuki the Snake		
2004	Gad Guard	Catherine Flobér		Resume
2004	Requiem from the Darkness			Resume
2004	Stellvia	Ren Renge	As Mia Bradly	Resume
2004	Lunar Legend Tsukihime	Aoko Aozaki	As Mia Bradly	Resume
2004	Paranoia Agent	Mrs. Kamohara	As Kirsty Pape	Resume
2004	Burn-Up: Scramble	Warriors Commander	As Mia Bradly	Resume
2004	Submarine 707R	Yuu	As Mia Bradly, OVA	Resume
2004	Please Twins!	Kikuchi		Resume
2005	Hanaukyo Maid Team La Verite	Mariel	As Mia Bradly	Resume
2005	Rumiko Takahashi Anthology	Matsuko Kogure	As Kirsty Pape	Resume
2005	Overman King Gainer	Jaboli Mariela	As Mia Bradly	Resume
2005	Daphne in the Brilliant Blue	Millie	As Mia Bradly	Resume
2005	Koi Kaze	Shoko Akimoto, others		Resume
2005	Kyo Kara Maoh!	Cecilie von Spitzweg, Gisela von Christ, others	As Mia Bradly	Resume
2005	Scrapped Princess	Steyr, Fafal		Resume
2005	Tenjho Tenge	Makiko Nagi	As Mia Bradly, also Ultimate Fight	Resume
2005	Planetes	Sia's Mother		Resume
2005	Grenadier	Fuuka Shirato	As Mia Bradly	Resume
2005	Fafner in the Azure	Chizuru Tomi	As Mia Bradly	Resume
2005	Mermaid Forest	Nae, others	As Kirsty Pape	Resume
2005	DearS	Ren	As Mia Bradly	Resume
2005	Gankutsuou: The Count of Monte Cristo	Mercédès de Morcerf		Resume
2005	Immortal Grand Prix	Fantine Valjean	TV series	Resume
2005	Bottle Fairy	Chiriri	As Mia Bradly	Resume
2005	Di Gi Charat	Petit Charat	Also Leave It to Piyoko, Upchuck Bazooka, as Mia Bradly	Resume
2005–06	Samurai Champloo	Osuzu	Episode: "Hellhounds for Hire", as Mia Bradly	Press, Resume
2006	Gun X Sword	Fasalina		Resume
2006	Ergo Proxy	Various characters	As Kirsty Pape	Resume
2006	Ghost in the Shell: Stand Alone Complex	Various characters		Resume
2006	Fate/stay night	Rider		Resume
2006	Paradise Kiss	Yukino Koizumi		Resume
2006–07	Haré+Guu	Ravenna	As Mia Bradly	
2006–14	Bleach	Soifon, Momo Hinamori		Press, Resume
2007	Flag	Rowell Su-ming		Resume
2007	Tales of Phantasia: The Animation	Mint Adenade	As Mia Bradly, OVA	Resume
2007–11	Rozen Maiden	Suigintou	As Mia Bradly, also Traumend, Ouverture	
2008	Blue Dragon	Valkyrie		
2008	Lucky Star	Miyuki Takara		
2008	Gurren Lagann	Kiyoh Bachika		
2008–09	Code Geass series	Kallen Stadtfeld		
2009	Ah My Buddha	Sumi Ikuina		Resume
2009	Monster	Nina Fortner / Anna Liebert		
2011	Mobile Suit Gundam Unicorn	Loni Garvey	Vol. 4: "At the Bottom of the Gravity Well"	
2011–12	K-On!	Sawako Yamanaka	2 TV series	Press
2012	Puella Magi Madoka Magica	Kazuko Saotome		Press, Tweet
2012	Persona 4: The Animation	Nanako Dojima		
2012–14	Hellsing Ultimate	Hienkel Wulf, others		
2013	Blue Exorcist	Michelle Neuhaus		Tweet
2013	Fate/Zero	Sola-Ui Nuada-Re, Asako		Press
2014	Magi: The Labyrinth of Magic	Paimon, Zainab		
2014	Toradora!	Yasuko Takasu	Nominated – BTVA Anime Award for Best Female Supporting Vocal Performance in an Anime Television Series/OVA	
2014	Kill la Kill	Omiko Hakodate	Ep. 2	
2014	Gargantia on the Verdurous Planet	Striker		
2014–15	Knights of Sidonia	Eiko Yamano		
2015	Coppelion	Yukiko Kawabata		
2015	Mobile Suit Gundam: The Origin	Casval Rem Deikun		
2015	Sword Art Online II	Oosawa Sachie, Urd	Ep. 14–17	
2015–16	Durarara!!×2	Emilia, others		
2016	Love Live!	Director Minami		
2016–17	Berserk	Casca	2016 series	
2017	Anohana: The Flower We Saw That Day	Irene Honma		
2018	Skip Beat!	Shoko Aki	Kickstarter-funded, released to sponsors in 2017	
2018	Cells at Work!	Narrator		
2018–19	Hunter × Hunter	Palm Siberia	2011 series	
2020	Ghost in the Shell: SAC_2045	Yoshie Shimamura		
2020	Yashahime	Mistress Three-Eyes, Old Lady		
2022	Bleach: Thousand-Year Blood War	Soifon, Momo Hinamori, Cyan Sun-Sun		
2023	Gamera Rebirth	Nora Melchiorri		

=== Animation ===
List of voice performances in animation
Year	Title	Role	Notes	Source
1994–95	Insektors	Aelia	North American dub	
2007	All Grown Up	Luca, German Woman	Ep. "O Bro, Where Art Thou?"	
2009–12	Huntik: Secrets & Seekers	Zhalia Moon		
2011	Family Guy	Girl	Thanksgiving episode	
2011–12	Winx Club	Nebula	Nickelodeon dub; seasons 3-4	Resume
2012	Monsuno	Jinja, Medea, Charlemagne, various characters		
2013–15	Clay Kids	Carol		
2014	Hero Factory	Natalie Breez		
2015	Ever After High	Bunny Blanc, Queen of Hearts, Ashlynn Ella	Netflix series Ep. "Spring Unsprung"	
2018	Enchantimals	Fanci Flamingo		
2020–24	Droners	Flora, Gavinda Teach		
2021	Monster Hunter: Legends of the Guild	Genovan, Ebbi	Netflix original animated film	
2021	High Guardian Spice	Elodie		
2023	The Loud House	Astrid Bjorklundson	Episode: "Too Cool for School"	

=== Feature films ===
List of voice performances in feature films
Year	Title	Role	Notes	Source
2005	Appleseed	Hitomi, Gilliam Knute	Geneon dub; limited theatrical release	Resume
2017	Resident Evil: Vendetta		Limited theatrical release	

=== Direct-to-video and television films ===
List of voice performances in direct-to-video and television films
Year	Title	Role	Notes	Source
2002	Gundress			Resume
2003	Sakura Wars: The Movie	Kasumi Fuji	As Kirsty Pape	Resume
2006–11	Juno Baby videos	Various characters	French version	Resume
2008	The Ruins	Additional Vine Vocal	Live-action dub	
2008	Bleach: Memories of Nobody	Soifon		Resume
2009	Bleach: The DiamondDust Rebellion	Soifon		Resume
2011	Bleach: Fade to Black	Soifon		Resume
2012	Little Big Panda	Manchu		
2012–present	Lego Friends	Olivia		
2013	K-On: The Movie	Sawako Yamanaka		
2014	Monster High: Frights, Camera, Action!	Elissabat (Veronica Von Vamp)		
2015	Monster High: Boo York, Boo York	Catty Noir		
2025	The Rose of Versailles	Narrator		

=== Foreign shows dubbing in English ===
List of English-language dubbings of foreign language shows
Year	Title	Country	Dubbed from	Role	Live Actor	Source
2016	Marseille	France	French	Vanessa d'Abrantes	Nadia Fares	
2016	The Break	Belgium	French	The Psychiatrist	Jasmina Douieb	

=== Video games ===
List of voice performances in video games
Year	Title	Role	Notes	Source
1992	Dune	Chani	Grouped under Voices, Also Motion Capture	
1995	Lost Eden	Eve, Komalla	Grouped under Voices	
1997	Dark Earth	Kalhi		
1999	Omikron: The Nomad Soul	Various characters		
2000	Alice In Wonderland	Alice	Lexis Numérique game	
2001	The Shadow of Zorro	Agatha, Maid, Senora		
2004	Ace Combat 5: The Unsung War	Kei Nagase		
2004	EverQuest II games	Various characters		Resume
2004	Tom Clancy's Ghost Recon 2	Various characters	Also motion capture	Resume
2004	World of Warcraft	Various characters		Resume
2006	Suikoden V	Sialeeds	Uncredited	
2006	Rumble Roses XX	Miss Spencer, Mistress	Uncredited	
2006	Dirge of Cerberus: Final Fantasy VII	Various characters		
2006	Valkyrie Profile 2: Silmeria	Richelle, Sylphide	As Kirsty Pape	
2006	Dead or Alive Xtreme 2	Helena Douglas		
2007	Armored Core 4	Anjou, Mary Shelley		In-game credits
2007	Odin Sphere	Gwendolyn	Uncredited	
2007	Persona 3	Aigis, Natsuki Moriyama	Also FES, Portable	
2007	Warriors Orochi	Additional voices	Uncredited	Resume
2007	Bleach: Shattered Blade	Soifon, Momo Hinamori		Resume
2007	Bladestorm: The Hundred Years' War	Additional voices		Resume
2007	Trauma Center: New Blood			
2008	Final Fantasy IV	Rosa Farrell		
2008	Soulcalibur IV	Shura		
2008	Warriors Orochi 2	Additional voices	Uncredited	Resume
2008–12	Persona 4	Nanako Dojima, Izanami	Also Arena, Golden, Vol. 2	
2009	League of Legends	Shyvana, Fiora, Elise, Zyra, Cassiopeia		Resume
2009	Resident Evil: The Darkside Chronicles	Alexia Ashford		
2009	The Saboteur	Veronique, Franziska, Francine, Gisella	Also motion capture	
2009	Final Fantasy Crystal Chronicles: The Crystal Bearers	Additional voices		
2010	Fragile Dreams: Farewell Ruins of the Moon		Uncredited	Resume
2010	Dead or Alive Paradise	Helena Douglas		
2010	Mimana Iyar Chronicle		Uncredited	Resume
2010	Sakura Wars: So Long, My Love	Diana Caprice	Uncredited	
2010	Valkyria Chronicles II	Juliana Everhart		
2010	Sengoku Basara: Samurai Heroes	Magoichi Saica		
2010	Fallout New Vegas	Ghouls		
2010	Sonic Free Riders	Rouge the Bat		
2010	Sonic Colors	Rouge the Bat	DS version	
2011	Mortal Kombat	Kitana, Mileena		Resume
2011	Rune Factory: Tides of Destiny	Maerwen		
2011	Sonic Generations	Rouge the Bat	Console/PC version	
2011	Mario & Sonic at the London 2012 Olympic Games	Rouge the Bat		
2012	NeverDead	Cypher		
2012	Street Fighter X Tekken	Poison		
2012	Zero Escape: Virtue's Last Reward	Phi	Uncredited	
2013	Fire Emblem Awakening	Olivia, Anna		
2013	StarCraft II: Heart of the Swarm	Izsha		
2013	Killer Instinct	Aria		
2013	Ingress	Dr. Devra Bogdanovich		
2014	Earth Defense Force 2025	Tactics Officer		
2014	Ultra Street Fighter IV	Poison		
2014	Persona Q: Shadow of the Labyrinth	Nanako, Aigis		
2014	Lego Ninjago: Nindroids	Lloyd Garmadon, P.I.X.A.L.		
2015	Mortal Kombat X	Kitana, Mileena		
2015	Persona 4: Dancing All Night	Nanako Dojima		Facebook
2015-16	Lego Dimensions	Lloyd Garmadon, P.I.X.A.L, Clara Clayton, Auntie Em, Elliott Taylor	Credited as "Voiceover Talent"	
2016	Heroes of the Storm	Chromie		
2016	Mario & Sonic at the Rio 2016 Olympic Games	Rouge the Bat		
2016	Killing Floor 2	The Trader		
2016	Shantae: Half-Genie Hero	Sky	Friends to the End	
2016	Zero Time Dilemma	Phi		
2017	Fire Emblem Heroes	Anna, Hana, Olivia		
2017	Akiba's Beat	Kanata Saotome		
2017	Sonic Forces	Rouge the Bat		
2018	Detective Pikachu	Rose Milton		
2018	BlazBlue: Cross Tag Battle	Aigis		
2018	Conan Exiles	Muriela the Artisan		
2019	Resident Evil 2	Annette Birkin	Also motion capture	
2019	Dead or Alive 6	Helena Douglas		
2019	Team Sonic Racing	Rouge the Bat		
2019	Fire Emblem: Three Houses	Anna		
2019	Shantae and the Seven Sirens	Sky		
2019	Street Fighter V	Poison	Season 4 DLC	
2019	Mario and Sonic at the Olympic Games Tokyo 2020	Rouge the Bat		
2020	Phantasy Star Online 2	Xiera	Story mode Episode 4	
2020	Resident Evil: Resistance	Annette Birkin		
2021	Akiba's Trip: Hellbound & Debriefed	The Master		
2022	Relayer	Chairman Xoth, additional voices		
2022	Fire Emblem Warriors: Three Hopes	Anna		
2023	Master Detective Archives: Rain Code	Iruka		
2023	Sonic Dream Team	Rouge the Bat		
2024	Persona 3 Reload	Additional voices		
2024	The Legend of Heroes: Trails Through Daybreak	Citizens		
2024	Shadow Generations	Rouge the Bat		
2025	Xenoblade Chronicles X: Definitive Edition	Murderess		
2025	Bleach Rebirth of Souls	Soi Fon, Momo Hinamori, Cyan Sun-Sun		
2025	Sonic Racing: CrossWorlds	Rouge the Bat		
2026	Ace Combat 8: Wings of Theve	Kei Nagase		Timestamp 0:48

=== Audio drama ===
List of voice and dubbing performances in audio dramas
Year	Title	Role	Notes	Source
2026	Sonic the Hedgehog Presents: The Chaotix Casefiles	Rouge the Bat		

=== Live-action roles ===
List of acting performances
Year	Series	Role	Notes	Source
1990	Counterstrike	Sandy	Episode: "Escape Route"	
1994	Death and the Maiden	Elena Galvin		Resume
2004	Medical Investigation	Jenna Kirkland	Episode: "Price of Pleasure"	Resume
2005	Gilmore Girls	Francoise		Resume
2006	Big Love	Neighbor	Episode: "Viagra Blue"	Resume
2007	The Young and the Restless	French Tourist	Episode #1.8583	Resume
2008	House	Female Guest #1	Episode: "Don't Ever Change"	Resume
2008	Adventures in Voice Acting	Herself	Documentary film on voice acting	
2010	Desperate Housewives	Sobbing Woman	Episode: "How About a Friendly Shrink?"	Resume
2010	Big Time Rush	The Correction Officer	Episode: "Big Time Photo Shoot"	Resume
2010	Criminal Minds	Martha Porter	Episode: "Exit Wounds"	Resume
2011	Weeds	Jolene		
2012	Lie with Me	Deanna O'Shannon		Resume
2013	Betas	Scarlet	Episode: "Strange Magic"	Resume
2015	Days of Our Lives	Screaming Mom	Episode #1.12508	Resume
2015	The Red Thunder		Short film by Alvaro Ron for Cadillac ATS Coupe	
2015	Workaholics	Paula	Episode: "Ditch Day"	Tweet
2015	Silicon Valley	Hooli Lead Counsel	Episodes: "Binding Arbitration" and "Two Days of the Condor"	Tweet
2015	I Spit on Your Grave III: Vengeance is Mine	Lynne		
2019	Creepshow	Leslianne Dowd	Episode: "Times is Tough in Musky Holler"	Resume
2022	CSI: Vegas	Prudence Perlmutter	Episode: "In the White Room"	
