= The Big Score =

The Big Score may refer to:

- An episode from the Alfred Hitchcock Presents series.
- An episode from the Nickelodeon TV show, All Grown Up!. See List of All Grown Up! episodes: Season 3: 2005.
- The Big Score (1983 film), a 1983 American film directed by Fred Williamson
- The Big Score (1990 film), a 1990 Hong Kong film directed by Wong Jing
- The Big Score, the penultimate mission in Grand Theft Auto V, where $200M is robbed from the Union Depository.
- The Big Score (2016 film), a 2016 Italian film directed by Carlo Verdone
