= Clay Kids =

Spanish animated series

- Genre: Stop motion, animated, children's, comedy
- Created by: Javier Tostado
- Directed by: Javier Tostado
- Voices of: Michael Derry; Karen Strassman; David Markus; MJ Lallo; Mark Allen Jr; Quinn Kitmitto; David Marcus; Natalie Mitchell; Susan Haight
- Opening theme: "Clay Kids Opening Theme", performed by Kokane
- Ending theme: Asteroid Rush VIP by Guillermo Tostado
- Composers: B. Blaya; Guillermo Tostado
- Country of origin: Spain
- Original languages: Spanish; English
- No. of seasons: 2
- No. of episodes: 52 (list of episodes)

Production
- Executive producers: María Lara Roca; Francesca Nicoll
- Producer: Raquel Hernández
- Camera setup: 1080p HD
- Running time: 11 minutes
- Production companies: Clay Animation; TVE

Original release
- Network: Gloob; Pop; Pop Max; Clan
- Release: 5 July 2013 – 14 August 2015

Clay Kids is a Spanish stop motion animated series created by Javier Tostado. The series narrates the adventures of 7 misfit kids. It was produced by Clay Animation and distributed by Cake Entertainment and aired from 5 July 2013 to 14 August 2015.

The characters' mouths are moved to mimic the English speech, since according to the producers, the Spanish audience is already used to dubbed TV shows, and unlike an English audience would not be bothered by a lack of synchronization between mouth and speech.

== Plot ==
A group of children brought together by chance explore their daily life in their clay town.

== Characters ==
=== Main characters ===
- Flippy (voiced by Michael Derry in the English version and Ignasi Diaz in the Spanish version) is a troublemaker who hates studying and loves rapping and video games. He thinks of himself as popular, attractive and funny. He is good friends with Robbie.
- Motor (voiced by Mark Allen Jr in the English version and Jose Garcia in the Spanish version) is a gamer and amateur DJ. He doesn't have good manners or etiquette and he's often rude to others unintentionally. Motor is left side paralyzed and moves around in a motorized wheelchair.
- Carol (voiced by Karen Strassman in the English version and Julia Sorli in the Spanish version) is very intelligent and determined to save the planet. She's a good and responsible student, but she is not popular with her classmates. She is good friends with Albert.
- Robbie (voiced by David Markus in the English version and Ximo Solano in the Spanish version) is the oldest student in his class, having repeated the grade three times. He is characterized by his rebellious attitude and interest in graffiti. Often portrayed as an antagonist to his peers, he frequently teases his classmates and maintains a close friendship with Flippy.
- Naomi (voiced by Natalie Mitchell in the English version and Marina Vinals in the Spanish version) is a rich girl who is materialistic and quite judgmental. She enjoys texting and shopping. She wants to be a part of the 'popular' crowd, but she is excluded from their clique.
- Jessi (voiced by Quinn Kitmitto in the English version and Vero Andres in the Spanish version) is a 13-year-old girl who is naive and child-like. She is very kind to others and loves skateboarding. She is good friends with everyone.
- Albert (voiced by M.J Lallo in the English version and Cristina Soler in the Spanish version) is the shortest. He is smart and enjoys art, science, astronomy and reading poetry. He falls in love very easily and quickly. Albert has many allergies and is also asthmatic.

=== Secondary characters ===
- Frank (voiced by Michael Derry in the English version and Jose Manuel Casany in the Spanish version) is Carol's father and manager of the Cyber Cafe and likes computer games.
- Ms. Henderson (voiced by Susan Haight in the English version and Julia Sorli in the Spanish version) is the teacher.
- Principal (voiced by Mark Allen Jr in the English version and Jose Manuel Casany in the Spanish version) is the school principal who appears in some episodes.
- Doctor Ed (voiced by David Marcus in the English version and Jose Manuel Casany in the Spanish version) is the doctor. He appears in some episodes.

== Episodes ==
Season 1 and 2 each contain 26 episodes, making a total of 52 episodes.

=== Season 1 ===
No. Overall	No. in series	Title	Story By	Teleplay By
1	1	Big Mean Steve	Rubén Ontiveros	Seth Kearsley and Paul Harrison
Flippy and Robbie try to make a video of Jessie's skateboarding. Airdate: 5 July 2013
2	2	Boy Band	Mike Booth	Seth Kearsley and Paul Harrison
Naomi wins the chance to chat with her favorite band, Boydance, through her webcam. 6 July 2013
3	3	Social Network	Mike Booth	Seth Kearsley
Flippy accidentally adds his mom on Claybook which causes everyone's parents to embarrass the gang online. 8 July 2013
4	4	Big In Japan	Diego San José	Kerry Torchia
Flippy and Motor create a parody video of a viral Japanese dance. 10 July 2013
5	5	Grounded	Mike Booth	Seth Kearsley and Paul Harrison
Naomi is grounded and can't use her phone. 12 July 2013
6	6	Flying Saucer	Mike Booth	Seth Kearsley and Paul Harrison
Robbie and Naomi get abducted by aliens. 13 July 2013
7	7	Thinking Out Loud	Diego San José	
Flippy bumps his head and begins to hear people's thoughts. 15 July 2013
8	8	Wizard School	Rubén Ontiveros	Seth Kearsley and Paul Harrison
Robbie and Carol are kept back at school. 18 July 2013
9	9	Albert in Love	Diego San José	Seth Kearsley and Paul Harrison
Albert develops a crush on Jessi. 20 July 2013
10	10	In Your Dreams	Rubén Ontiveros	
Carol has to sign a petition to save the local forest. 22 July 2013
11	11	Operation Sneeze	Diego San José	
The kids have to find a way to stop Frank's sneeze. 25 July 2013
12	12	Paparazzi	Diego San José	
Naomi starts a gossip magazine at school. 28 July 2013
13	13	Console of the Future	Rubén Ontiveros	Seth Kearsley and Paul Harrison
Flippy gives Robbie a knock-off GameStation 3DX which allows him to alter real life. 30 July 2013
14	14	Trapped in Time	Diego San José	
Naomi keeps repeating the same day over and over again. August 2, 2013
15	15	Ghost	Diego San José	
Robbie buys some fireworks that make him look like a ghost. August 4, 2013
16	16	Flippy's Shoes	Diego San José	
Flippy and Robbie get into rivalry over who's better at basketball. August 6, 2013
17	17	Heart Hacked	Diego San José	Seth Kearsley and Paul Harrison
Flippy and Robbie prank a nerd on a dating site, but the prank backfires. August 9, 2013
18	18	Ms. Henderson's Boyfriend	Diego San José	
The kids find Ms. Henderson a boyfriend. August 11, 2013
19	19	The Clone Wardrobe	Rubén Ontiveros	
Robbie uses his wardrobe to make clones of himself. August 15, 2013
20	20	Zombied	Diego San José	
Motor makes a game that causes the world to become addicted. August 17, 2013
21	21	Sick	Rubén Ontiveros	
Robbie pretends to be sick and enjoys the attention it gives him. August 19, 2013
22	22	Attention Please	Mike Booth	Kerry Torchia
Robbie and Flippy are sent to the principal's office for messing around. August 21, 2013
23	23	Three Versions	Diego San Jose	Mike Booth
Albert was found with holding a pineapple while sitting on a basketball hoop. Naomi, Robbie and Albert have three different versions of how it happened. August 23, 2013
24	24	Bugged	Mike Booth	Kerry Torchia
Robbie buys an aftershave that makes bugs attracted to him. Airdate: August 26, 2013
25	25	Flower Power	Mike Booth	
Albert eats a flower that makes him stronger. He uses this new strength to get revenge on his bullies. Airdate: July 4, 2014
26	26	Embiggenator	Mike Booth	
Motor makes a machine that makes things bigger. Airdate: July 8, 2014

=== Season 2 ===
No. Overall	No. in series	Title	Story By	Teleplay By
27	1	Puppy!	Diego San Jose	Mike Booth
Naomi must investigate how her puppy went missing. July 9, 2014
28	2	Catchy Tune	Rubén Ontiveros	Mike Booth
A catchy tune is playing somehow. July 10, 2014
29	3	Dance Baby Dance	Mike Booth	Seth Kearsley
Robbie learns how to dance. July 14, 2014
30	4	Make a Wish	Seth Kearsley	Mike Booth
The kids make a wish. July 16, 2014
31	5	A Day in the Jessi	Rubén Ontiveros	Mike Booth
A glimpse into Jessi's life. July 17, 2014
32	6	Motor is Missing	Mike Booth	Seth Kearsley
Motor has gone missing and his friends have to find him. July 18, 2014
33	7	Mind Mess	Rubén Ontiveros	Mike Booth
A mess has been occurred. July 21, 2014
34	8	Danger, Albert Is Loose!	Rubén Ontiveros	Mike Booth
Albert is on the loose. July 24, 2014
35	9	Depixelator	Seth Kearsley	Mike Booth
A depixelator is going through a very strict substitute. August 9, 2014
36	10	Piranha	Mark Zaslove	Mike Booth
A piranha from Brazil arrives in a box. August 19, 2014
37	11	Brain Gain	Rubén Ontiveros	Mike Booth
Flippy wears hat which gives his brain powers. September 4, 2014
38	12	Naomi's Birthday	Seth Kearsley	Mike Booth
It is Naomi's birthday. September 6, 2014
39	13	Invisiboy!	Mike Booth	Seth Kearsley
Robbie wears a cloak that turns him invisible. September 15, 2014
40	14	Game Over	Mike Booth	Seth Kearsley
After an electric shock, Flippy believes he is in a real life video game. June 15, 2015
41	15	Gone Viral	Seth Kearsley	Mike Booth
Flippy goes viral. June 19, 2015
42	16	Cousin	Mike Booth	Seth Kearsley
Someone's cousin is visiting. June 26, 2015
43	17	The Odor	Seth Kearsley	Mike Booth
Robbie buys a bottle of aftershave. July 15, 2015
44	18	Skates for Skates	Mike Booth	Seth Kearsley
Carol learns to skate. July 19, 2015
45	19	Be in My Video	Mike Booth	Seth Kearsley
Flippy and Motor create a video. July 20, 2015
46	20	Albert the Great Detective	Mike Booth	Seth Kearsley
Albert becomes a detective around the town. July 26, 2015
47	21	Drones	Seth Kearsley	Mike Booth
Motor discovers what drones can do. July 29, 2015
48	22	Time Freeze	Mike Booth	Seth Kearsley
The time has been frozen. August 5, 2015
49	23	The IT Kid	Seth Kearsley	Mike Booth
The kids are doing IT. August 10, 2015
50	24	Zalder	Seth Kearsley	Mike Booth
The zalder is being made at the same time. August 12, 2015
51	25	Dreaming	Seth Kearsley	Mike Booth
The duo are dreaming. August 13, 2015
52	26	Countdown	Seth Kearsley	Mike Booth
It is the countdown to Autumn. August 14, 2015

== App game ==
A mobile app game titled Talking Clay Kids was released for iOS and for Android between September and November 2013. The game was made by My Talking Toys.

== Broadcast ==
Gloob held a preview for Clay Kids in Brazil on 29 June 2013 and the series officially premiered on 5 July 2013.

In the UK, Clay Kids aired on Pop. On 1 June 2015, the series moved to its sister channel, Pop Max. Reruns continued to air on Kix until late 2017. The series' final airing was on 14 August 2015. Reruns are no longer shown on Pop Max as the last time it aired was on 28 August 2017. On 16 November 2024 the full series became available to watch on Patreon.
