= Ever After High =

Fashion doll franchise

- Type: Fashion doll, web series, book series
- Company: Mattel
- Country: United States and Canada
- Availability: 2013–2018
- Slogan: The end is just the beginning. (2013–2015); Where Princesses Are Powerful. (2015–2018)

Ever After High is a fashion doll franchise released by Mattel in July 2013. It is a companion line to the Monster High dolls, with the characters being based upon characters from well-known fairy tales and fantasy stories instead of monsters and mythical creatures. As with Monster High and Barbie: Life in the Dreamhouse, the line varies in different countries and varies in languages. It has spawned a web series, a film, and five book series.

== Premise ==
Ever After High is a boarding school located in the Fairy Tale World. It is attended by the teenage children of fairy tale characters. The main characters are Raven Queen, who does not want to be evil like her mother the Evil Queen, and Apple White, the daughter of Snow White who wishes to live "happily ever after". Raven prefers to be free to create her own destiny, while Apple, to protect her and others' own destiny, believes that Raven should become the next Evil Queen. The students are generally divided into two groups. The "Royals" are the students who side with Apple in embracing their destinies and following in their parents' footsteps. The "Rebels" are the students who side with Raven in wanting to create their own destinies. Many of the stories are about the students' regular interactions as teens, but there is an underlying story arc where, according to the school's headmaster, if the students do not follow their individual destinies, their stories will cease to exist and they will disappear forever.

== Characters ==
Ever After High has a number of characters from its various media. The characters listed below are profiled at the franchise's website and most have featured dolls.

=== Royal main characters ===
These students are content with following their destinies as listed in their fairy tale:

- Apple White (voiced by Jonquil Goode) – The daughter of Snow White. She has light blond hair, light skin, and light blue eyes. She is described as a "motivated, smart, and natural-born leader" and aspires to be a Royal, following in the footsteps of her mother. She is roommates with Raven Queen. Her secret heart's desire is for people to know her as the fairest one of all on the inside as well as the outside. She is co-president of the student council and the editor of the yearbook.
- Alistair Wonderland (voiced by Robbie Daymond) – The son of Alice from Alice's Adventures in Wonderland. He has blond hair and blue eyes. He desires to explore the entire fairytale world. He has a crush on fellow Wonderland student Bunny Blanc but believes she only thinks of him as a friend. His doll debuted at the New York Toy Fair in 2015.
- Ashlynn Ella (voiced by Laura Bailey and Karen Strassman) – The daughter of Cinderella. She has strawberry blonde hair and emerald green eyes. She typically wears dresses in floral prints. She works part-time at the Glass Slipper shoe boutique. Her special ability is being able to talk to nature's plants and animals. She and Hunter Huntsman are a couple, although the latter is associated with the Rebels faction and she is expected to marry a Prince Charming. Nevertheless, she initially sides with the Royals as she wants to keep her heritage.
- Blondie Lockes (voiced by Julie Maddalena Kliewer) – The daughter of Goldilocks. She has long blonde curls with bangs, blue eyes, and wears a blue dress. She and Cupid are roommates, and she is best friends with Apple White and Briar Beauty. Her magic ability is to unlock any lock. At school she runs the Daily MirrorCast show, and she is the captain of the debate team.
- Briar Beauty (voiced by Kate Higgins) – The daughter of Sleeping Beauty. She is Apple White's best friend and sides with the Royals. She fears her destiny of having to sleep for a hundred years and tries to learn as much as she can before facing that spell. She has been known to fall asleep at various times. Her favorite colors are pink and black. Her special ability is being able to hear everything for miles but only while she is asleep. Her favorite school activity is being on the student council, where she is a party planner.
- Bunny Blanc (voiced by Karen Strassman) – The daughter of the White Rabbit from Alice's Adventures in Wonderland, she has white hair and sports a headband that has white/pink bunny ears. Her special ability is to change into a rabbit. She sometimes loses her sense of direction. She likes Alistair although she finds it heartbreaking that he only views her as a friend. She is also childhood friends with Lizzie and the other Wonderlandians. Her web debut was in "Spring Unsprung", when she journeys to Ever After High with Alistair to help find a cure for Wonderland.
- Dexter Charming (voiced by Evan Smith) – The son of King Charming from "every story where a Prince Charming comes to the rescue" and the brother of Daring Charming and Darling Charming. He has short brown hair and wears a blue plaid jacket with grey skinny pants, a striped blue-white scarf, a crown, and dark-framed glasses. His special ability is to make girls swoon when he removes his glasses. He has a huge crush on Raven Queen but is too shy to confess to her. He is unaware that Cupid has a crush on him. He has a twin sister named Darling, and an older brother named Daring.
- Duchess Swan (voiced by Stephanie Sheh) – The daughter of the Swan Queen from Swan Lake. She has black hair with light pink (white in the cartoon) streaks. Her doll has a black and white dress, black tights, and black heels with lavender-laced ballet straps. She is described as having a dual nature: graceful, yet competitive. Her special abilities are changing into a swan and dancing on water, although she admits she cannot sing. She is usually in cahoots with Sparrow Hood and engages in some villainy.
- Faybelle Thorn – The daughter of the Dark Fairy from Sleeping Beauty. She has blonde hair with a light blue streak. She wears a black dress, blue leggings, and light blue boots. As a Royal, she embraces her role as the villain and aspires to be the queen of fairies and villains. Her special ability is to enhance curses. Her activities at school include cheerleading and crashing parties. Faybelle has issues against Raven because the Evil Queen once invaded her mother's country where Sleeping Beauty resides.
- Holly O'Hair (voiced by Colleen Foy) – The daughter of Rapunzel and the twin sister of Poppy O'Hair. She has long strawberry-blonde hair, that can act as a strong rope, even when it is cut. Her doll has a metallic outfit, high heels, and a crown made of holly flowers. Her activities include acting like a damsel in distress, and writing fan fiction. Her mother runs Rapunzel's Tower Hair Salon.
- Lizzie Hearts (voiced by Wendee Lee) – The daughter of Queen of Hearts in Alice's Adventures in Wonderland. She has black hair with red streaks, a red heart-shaped mark covering her left eye. Her doll wears a red dress, black gloves, a gold crown and carries a heart-shaped purse. She aspires to be a kinder Queen of Hearts, although she uses the catchphrase "Off with your head!" as her way of saying "please" and "thank you". Her special ability is to build things out of playing cards.
- Justine Dancer – The twelfth dancing princess of The 12th Dancing Princess. She has long dark curly hair, blue eyes, and a dark complexion. She wants to open her own dance studio and direct shows and music videos.
- Meeshell Mermaid is the daughter of The Little Mermaid. She has dark coral-pink hair, and wears blue and pink. At school she walks on legs, but those transform into a mermaid tail when she gets wet. She was announced in 2015 as part of the Where Princesses are Powerful line, and first appeared in cartoon form in Dragon Games.
- Farrah Goodfairy is the daughter of the fairy godmother from Cinderella. She has light blue hair with purple and white streaks, and wears blue and silver-themed clothes. Farrah Goodfairy is able to use magic but its effects expire at 12. She is best friends with Ashlynn Ella. Her cartoon debut was in Dragon Games.

=== Rebel main characters ===
Some of the following students do not agree with their destinies and want their own destiny:

- Raven Queen (voiced by Erin Fitzgerald) – The daughter of the Evil Queen, and Apple's roommate. Raven has violet eyes and black hair with purple highlights. She has no desire to follow in her mother's footsteps in becoming a villain. Her actions end up starting the Rebel faction, which she is reluctant to lead. Her abilities include casting spells, but they are usually of the black magic kind. If she tries to use her powers for good, it usually backfires. Her romance status is "not even looking" as she is more focused on figuring out her destiny.
- C.A. Cupid (voiced by Erin Fitzgerald) – Transfer student from Monster High and the adopted daughter of Eros: God of Love from Mount Olympus. She has pink hair and wings, and carries a bow and arrow, although she is not a good shot. While her arrows can help people fall in love, she relies on her own magic to help people listen to their hearts. She would also like to fall in love herself, with an interest in Dexter Charming. C.A. Cupid and Blondie Lockes are roommates. She sides with the Rebels in that everyone should be able to follow their hearts, and has served as an advisor for her schoolmates on romance issues. C.A. Cupid also participates in the Daily Mirrorcast with Blondie Lockes.
- Cedar Wood (voiced by Jonquil Goode) – The daughter of Pinocchio and a life-size puppet made of cedar. She has dark brown hair and a tan complexion and wears a pink dress. She harbors a curse where she has to tell the truth during her high school days; her friends are thus careful what they say around her. Her goal is to become a real girl. Her doll in the Hat-Tastic Party set has her wearing a Pinocchio-styled hat, a modern Harajuku-styled dress, and Mary Jane platform shoes. Her favorite subject is arts & crafts.
- Cerise Hood (voiced by Rena S. Mandel) – The daughter of Red Riding Hood. She has black hair with a streak of grey. She wears a buffalo-checkered print dress with silver foil lace sleeves, distressed leather leggings and lace-up boots. Her purse is a picnic basket. She wears a red cape to hide her wolf ears, and has an appetite for meat as her father is actually Mr. Badwolf, one of the first Rebels. Her special ability is to "travel unseen through shadows".
- Darling Charming (voiced by Marieve Herington) – The daughter of King Charming and the sister to Dexter and Daring Charming. She has blonde hair with light blue streaks. She wears a blue dress with a bodice inspired by knight's armor. Her doll also wears a silver tiara, shoes, and carries a silver purse. Her magic ability is to see in slow motion when she tosses her hair. She aspires to be a heroine rather than a damsel-in-distress.
- Ginger Breadhouse (voiced by Salli Saffioti) – The daughter of the Candy Witch from Hansel and Gretel. Her doll has pink hair and dons round pink glasses, a candy-colored sparkle dress, frosting-styled boots, a cupcake headband, and a cauldron handbag. She does not like her destiny of having to eat people and would rather cook for them, with aspirations of becoming a pastry chef with her own cooking show. Her special ability is to add spells to her food such as making ice cream where the eater can turn invisible. In the webisode "Ginger in the Breadhouse", she was rejected by the Royals as no one would eat her treats, falsely believing her to be a villain like her mother, but are convinced otherwise after celebrity chef Not-so-little Jack Horner tried her food and approved it.
- Hunter Huntsman (voiced by Grant George) – The son of the Huntsman from Snow White and the Seven Dwarfs and Little Red Riding Hood. He has short brown hair, and usually wears a green shirt, a brown hoodie, a leather-like vest, tan pants, and tall hiking boots. He also carries a textured messenger bag. He enjoys helping animals, and his special ability is to be able to fashion things out of the random materials he has available, although he considers himself bad at making traps as they always break. He loves fellow animal lover Ashlynn Ella, but tries to keep their relationship a secret as it is against the Royal storyline. He and Dexter Charming are roommates.
- Kitty Cheshire (voiced by Bekka Prewitt) – The daughter of the Cheshire Cat from Alice's Adventures in Wonderland. She has curly purple hair in high pigtails, and wears a purple dress, a headband and handbag styled with the cat's iconic smile. Her special ability is to disappear and appear without notice. Her doll description calls her "a curious prankster who always has a smile on her face and in her wardrobe."
- Madeline Hatter (voiced by Cindy Robinson) – The daughter of the Mad Hatter from Alice's Adventures in Wonderland, Maddie is Raven's best friend. She has dark teal hair with mint green and purple highlights and a teacup on her head resembling a top hat. Although she considers herself a Royal in embracing her destiny, she sides with the Rebels and agrees that everyone should have their own choice. Her magic ability is to pull things out of her hat, talk to the Narrators, and she claims she can see into the future, although most of her friends do not believe her. She has a pet mouse named Earl Grey. Her roommate is Kitty Cheshire. Her special ability is to speak Riddlish, a language of rhymes and riddles that is used in Wonderland. She is co-president of the Royal Student Council.
- Poppy O'Hair (voiced by Lindsay Ames) – The daughter of Rapunzel and the twin sister of Holly O'Hair. Her purple-dyed hair is styled in an asymmetric cut or a short pixie-style cut and she wears a bandanna headband. Her special ability is in her hair, which she can trim every morning, but can also sell. She works at the Tower Hair Salon as a stylist. In the episode "Poppy the RoyBel" she ponders whether to join the Royals and in the episode "O'Hair's Split Ends", she learns that she is actually the older twin, which means she inherits Rapunzel's destiny. However, the sisters agree to keep the destinies they want.
- Rosabella Beauty (voiced by Paula Rhodes) – The daughter of Beauty from Beauty and the Beast and Briar's cousin. Her special ability is to see people for who they really are. She has brown hair, wears glasses, and has a petal-print jacket with a furry lapel, red rose embellished boots and belt.
- Courtly Jester (voiced by Paula Rhodes) – The daughter of the Joker card from Alice's Adventures in Wonderland. She first appeared in the 2015 special "Way Too Wonderland" where she was the student body president of Wonderland High. She is imprisoned following her shenanigans in the episodes, and later appears in the video "Courtly Pleads Her Case", released October 15, where viewers could then vote on her destiny on the website. She was later added to the website, along with a doll release.
- Nina Thumbell is the daughter of Thumbelina. She has blonde hair, blue eyes, and a tan complexion. She wears petal and flower-themed clothes and accessories. She is about the same size as her classmates, but she has the ability to shrink to her thumb size. She was announced in 2015 as part of the Where Princesses are Powerful line, and debuted as a cartoon character in Dragon Games. Her webisode debut was in "Thumb-believable".
- Melody Piper (voiced by Laura Bailey) – The daughter of the Pied Piper of Hamelin, she enjoys DJing. She is Ginger Breadhouse's roommate.

=== Other students ===
The following students have website profiles, but it is not clear what faction they are part of:

- Jillian Beanstalk – The daughter of Jack from Jack and the Beanstalk. She has brown hair with green streaks, tan skin. She plays harp in the school band. She was announced in 2015 as part of the Where Princesses are Powerful line, and first appeared in cartoon form in Dragon Games. Although her website description associates her with the Royals with the statement "I'm ready to dive crown first into my story and follow it from Once Upon a Time to THE END", her doll description associates her with the Rebels.
- Brooke Page (voiced by Marieve Herington) – A young Narrator-In-Training who is the daughter of the two Narrators. She lives inside the Magic Mirror called the Mirror Network.

The following students are supporting characters that have yet to have a doll or a website profile. Some are not tied to either faction.

- Daring Charming (voiced by Evan Smith) – Dexter and Darling's brother who is the son of King Charming. He is very photogenic and hopes to marry Apple White as is his destiny.
- Humphrey Dumpty (voiced by Cindy Robinson) – The son of Humpty Dumpty. He wears rectangular glasses and looks nerdy as he enjoys high tech, but he is also a rap artist.
- Hopper Croakington II (voiced by Cam Clarke) – The son of the Frog Prince. He turns into a frog whenever he gets tongue-tied around princesses.
- Sparrow Hood (voiced by Todd Haberkorn) – The son of Robin Hood, he enjoys playing guitar and singing lead in the band called the Merry Men.
- Gus Crumb and Helga Crumb – Two cousins who enjoy sweets and are the children of the siblings Hansel and Gretel. In the books by Shannon Hale, Gus's mother is Gretel, and Helga's father is Hansel. However, the webisode "Ginger in the Breadhouse" associates Gus with Hansel and Helga with Gretel.

=== Ever After High faculty ===
The following are the faculty members of Ever After High:

- Milton Grimm (voiced by Jamieson Price) – The headmaster of Ever After High and the brother of Giles Grimm. He treats the students with a favorable destiny better than the ones without but insists that everyone follows the destiny as dictated by their story.
- Giles Grimm (voiced by Cam Clarke) – The brother of Milton Grimm. He spends much of his time in Vault of Lost Tales, a secret library under the school. Giles possesses a mirror that allows him to see whatever he needs so he remains up to date on everything. In "Thronecoming", he becomes the co-headmaster of Ever After High after Apple, Raven, and their friends broke his spell.
- Baba Yaga (voiced by Kate Higgins) – A witch who is the faculty adviser of Ever After High. She teaches magic.
- Mr. Badwolf – An anthropomorphic wolf who teaches home evilnomics and general villainy. He also has a human form. Though he is meant to be the antagonist of Little Red Riding Hood, Mr. Badwolf and Little Red Riding Hood learned to get along in secret which resulted in the secret child-raising of Cerise Hood.
- Professor Pied Piper – The father of Melody Piper teaches "Muse-Ic" where his music summons rats from the sky.
- Professor Rumpelstiltskin – The Science and sorcery teacher.
- Coach Gingerbreadman (voiced by Audu Paden) – A gingerbread man who teaches "Grimnastics."
- Professor Jack B. Nimble (voiced by Audu Paden) – Teacher of "Storytelling 101."
- The White Queen – The co-ruler of Wonderland alongside the Queen of Hearts who is the royal advisor to the princesses. She also teaches "Princessology."
- Dr. King Charming – The father of Daring Charming, Darling Charming, and Dexter Charming who teaches hero training.
- Professor Mama Bear – An anthropomorphic bear who teaches "Home Economyths".
- Professor Papa Bear – An anthropomorphic bespectacled bear that teaches Beast Training. He is shy when he speaks to girls.

== Development and release ==
Building upon the success of Monster High, in July 2013, Mattel announced plans to launch a spin-off line of dolls. The company estimated only about 10–20 million was budgeted for the development. Mattel's 2013 annual report noted that visitors of the website had spent an average of 20 minutes viewing content, and that it had contributed to gross sales.

In October 2013, Mattel launched Ever After High globally, reaching 14 countries, with plans to reach 30 territories in 2014. Six fashion dolls were initially released, and related social media such as a website, YouTube channel, global Facebook, and an interactive music video directed by Wayne Isham.

== Media ==
=== Web series and movie ===
Chapter	Episodes	Originally released	
Chapter	Episodes	First	Last
The Beginning	4	May 30, 2013	November 26, 2013
1	11	June 18, 2013	December 17, 2013
2	23	January 7, 2014	December 23, 2014
3	21	January 5, 2015	December 25, 2015
4	9	April 7, 2016	October 7, 2016

Ever After High has a series of animated shorts on YouTube. In June 2014, Netflix announced it was developing a series of episodes based on the webisodes, which was released on February 6, 2015.

The theme song was composed by Gabriel Mann and Allison Bloom, and was performed by Keeley Bumford. A live-action music video was released on October 15, 2013, featuring Stevie Dore as a high school senior and four younger girls dancing at a campus.

=== Book series ===
Little, Brown Books for Young Readers (LBYR) has developed a book series for Ever After High. The company had worked on the Monster High book series, which had sold over two million copies. LBYR vice-president Erin Stein said in an interview for Publishers Weekly that when he was first exposed to the Ever After High franchise, "immediately dozens of ideas were spinning in our heads...How could we resist publishing this? It was a no-brainer." The first book, The Storybook of Legends was written by Shannon Hale, who had worked on other titles such as Princess Academy and The Goose Girl. It debuted in October 2013, with the first print of 300,000 copies. Hale has remarked that she likes that the Ever After High books can reach kids who are not regular readers. The first book reached number 7 on the New York Times bestseller list for Children's Middle Grade. In addition to the trilogy, Hale was written a collection of short stories that were compiled in Once Upon a Time: A Story Collection.

Ever After High trilogy by Shannon Hale
No.	Title	Date	ISBN
1	The Storybook of Legends	October 8, 2013	9780316401227
2	The Unfairest of Them All	March 25, 2014	9780316282017
3	A Wonderlandiful World	August 26, 2014	9780316282093
N–A	Once Upon a Time: A Story Collection	October 21, 2014	9780316258210
4	The Legend of Shadow High: Ever After High Meets Monster High	October 17, 2017	9780316352826

LBYR has also released a second Ever After High book series by Suzanne Selfors. The first novel, Next Top Villain, was on the Publishers Weekly best-sellers list of Children's Frontlist Fiction for ten weeks.

Ever After High series by Suzanne Selfors
No.	Title	Date	ISBN
1	Next Top Villain	January 6, 2015	9780316401289
2	Kiss and Spell	April 7, 2015	9780316401319
3	A Semi-Charming Kind of Life	July 7, 2015	9780316401364
N–A	Once Upon a Pet: A Collection of Little Pet Stories	October 27, 2015	9780316264815
4	Fairy's Got Talent	December 15, 2015	9780316401432
5	Truth or Hair	May 3, 2016	9780316401425
6	Fairy Tail Ending	October 4, 2016	9780316384087

LBYR released a third book series called The Secret Diaries.

Ever After High: The Secret Diaries series by Heather Alexander
No.	Title	Author	Date	ISBN
1	The Secret Diary of Raven Queen	Heather Alexander	January 10, 2017	9780316501958
2	The Secret Diary of Apple White	Heather Alexander	May 2, 2017	9780316464994

LBYR released a fourth book series called Once Upon a Twist.

Ever After High: Once Upon a Twist series by Lisa Shea & Perdita Finn
No.	Title	Author	Date	ISBN
1	Once Upon a Twist: When the Clock Strikes Cupid	Lisa Shea	March 7, 2017	9780316501873
2	Once Upon a Twist: Cerise And The Beast	Lisa Shea	March 7, 2017	9780316501927
3	Once Upon a Twist: Rosabella and the Three Bears	Perdita Finn	July 18, 2017	9780316464963
4	Once Upon a Twist: Duchess Lets Down Her Hair	Perdita Finn	August 28, 2018	9780316476294
5	Once Upon a Twist: The Kitty Mermaid	Perdita Finn	May 7, 2019	9780316419093

Parragon Books has licensed Ever After High for activity packs, novelty-and-book sets, and gift box sets.

Ever After High: Graphic Novel series by Leigh Dragoon
No.	Title	Author	Date	ISBN
1	Ever After High: The Class of Classics	Leigh Dragoon	June 20, 2017	9780316337410

== See also ==
- Monster High
- Fairy tale
