= List of Ever After High webisodes =

The Ever After High doll franchise has spawned a web series whose episodes were released on their website and YouTube. The web series is organized into chapters, each of which contains various shorts. The first few shorts were released on May 30, 2013. Some of the YouTube shorts have been compiled into longer episodes that are available to watch on Netflix, along with new episodes that are advertised as "Netflix Originals." Some of the episodes are longer, such as the episode "Thronecoming", which premiered on Nickelodeon on November 2, 2014, as a television special. The feature film, "Spring Unsprung", was released as a Netflix exclusive on February 6, 2015.The theme song was composed by Gabriel Mann and Allison Bloom, and was performed by Keeley Bumford. A live-action music video was released on October 15, 2013, featuring Stevie Dore as a high school senior and four younger girls dancing at a campus.

== Series overview ==
| Chapter | Episodes | Originally released | |
| Chapter | Episodes | First | Last |
|---|---|---|---|
| The Beginning | 4 | May 30, 2013 | November 26, 2013 |
| 1 | 11 | June 18, 2013 | December 17, 2013 |
| 2 | 23 | January 7, 2014 | December 23, 2014 |
| 3 | 21 | January 5, 2015 | December 25, 2015 |
| 4 | 9 | April 7, 2016 | October 7, 2016 |

== Episodes ==
=== The Beginning (2013) ===
| No. overall | No. in chapter | Title | Directed by | Written by | Runtime | Original release date | Prod. code | Refs |
|---|---|---|---|---|---|---|---|---|
| 1 | 1 | "The World of Ever After High" | – | – | 2:40 | May 30, 2013 | 103 | |
An introduction to Ever After High and its students.
| 2 | 2 | "Apple's Tale: The Story of a Royal" | Brandon James Scott | George Doty IV | 8:30 | May 30, 2013 | 102 | |
After greeting her friends and love interest Prince Daring, Apple White meets her new roommate, Raven Queen, hoping the latter will follow her destiny to be the Evil Queen so that Apple can have her happily ever after. During rehearsal for Legacy Day, Raven Queen has questions about taking the pledge, and leaves. Headmaster Grimm tells Apple to watch over her roommate.
| 3 | 3 | "Raven's Tale: The Story of a Rebel" | Brandon James Scott | George Doty IV | 8:28 | May 30, 2013 | 101 | |
The first day of school from Raven Queen's point of view.
| 4 | 4 | "The Tale of Legacy Day" | Brandon James Scott | George Doty IV | 6:54 | November 26, 2013 | 113 | |
With Legacy Day being today, Apple's constant pressure, and Maddie's encouraging words, will Raven accept her destiny dutifully as the next Evil Queen, or flip the script and rewrite her path?

=== Chapter 1 (2013) ===
| No. overall | No. in chapter | Title | Original release date | Prod. code | Refs |
|---|---|---|---|---|---|
| 5 | 1 | "Stark Raven Mad" | June 18, 2013 | 104 | |
Headmaster Grimm and Baba Yaga try their best to anger Raven into becoming the Evil Queen with the help of Briar, Apple, Maddie, and Lizzie, but Raven turns Headmaster Grimm into a chicken instead.
| 6 | 2 | "True Reflections" | July 2, 2013 | 105 | |
After accidentally hexing Apple's magic mirror, Raven tries to look for a substitute while pretending nothing ever happened. To her surprise, Apple finds out, and Raven has to pose as her new magic mirror.
| 7 | 3 | "Maddie-in-Chief" | July 16, 2013 | 107 | |
In a sudden burst of madness, Maddie decides to run against Apple for the position of Royal Student Council President. However, Maddie flips the script and lets both of them hold the position instead.
| 8 | 4 | "Briar's Study Party" | July 30, 2013 | 109 | |
With only one day to study for one of Professor Rumpelstiltskin's ridiculously hard tests or face detention, Briar, who has studied virtually the whole textbook, offers to throw a study party to help her friends ace this test.
| 9 | 5 | "Here Comes Cupid" | August 13, 2013 | 106 | |
C.A. Cupid transfers from Monster High to Ever After High to help the students' love-lives.
| 10 | 6 | "The Shoe Must Go On" | August 27, 2013 | 110 | |
Ashlynn's shoe store, Glass Slipper Shoe Store, opens everyday at noon sharp, so she invites Briar and Blondie to the store to help. However, thanks to Hunter, all her new shoes manage to get displayed perfectly.
| 11 | 7 | "The Cat Who Cried Wolf" | September 10, 2013 | 112 | |
Cerise reveals her deepest, darkest secret to Raven: she is the daughter of both Little Red Riding Hood and the Big Bad Wolf. However, the mischievous Kitty overhears, and when she threatens to reveal Cerise's secret, Raven steps in to help.
| 12 | 8 | "Cedar Wood Would Love to Lie" | September 25, 2013 | 111 | |
Being unable to lie may be a good thing, but it is especially bad when you have a class project that requires you to tell a tall tale. After racking her brains, Cedar stumbles accidentally upon Hunter and Ashlynn's secret romance picnic in the Enchanted Forest. For fear of Cedar blurting out their secret, Ashlynn and Hunter let Cedar eat peanuts while talking so that her words come out all garbled.
| 13 | 9 | "Catching Raven" | October 29, 2013 | 108 | |
Dexter is too nervous to ask Raven to go to a party with him.
| 14 | 10 | "The Day Ever After" | December 10, 2013 | 114 | |
After Legacy Day, a heated argument erupts between the Royals and Rebels, resulting in a terrible foodfight started by Kitty.
| 15 | 11 | "Replacing Raven" | December 17, 2013 | 115 | |
One of the Three Little Pigs auditions to replace Raven as the Evil Queen, but later changes his mind.

=== Chapter 2 (2014) ===
| No. overall | No. in chapter | Title | Original release date | Prod. code | Refs |
|---|---|---|---|---|---|
| 16 | 1 | "Blondie's Just Right" | January 7, 2014 | 203 | |
Headmaster Grimm tells Blondie to use her Mirror Cast show to prove the false school legends are true, hoping that this will encourage students to follow their destiny.
| 17 | 2 | "True Hearts Day – Part 1" | January 21, 2014 | 201 | |
Cupid makes plans to revive a forgotten holiday, True Hearts Day, with Briar's help. However, Headmaster Grimm bans it. Meanwhile, Duchess threatens to expose Hunter and Ashlynn's secret relationship, and Dexter's attempt to tell Raven his feelings has unforeseen results.
| 18 | 3 | "True Hearts Day – Part 2" | February 4, 2014 | 201 | |
After Ashlynn and Hunter reveal their romance, it is met with various opinions, especially by Apple, and Headmaster Grimm begins to suspect party planning is going on.
| 19 | 4 | "True Hearts Day – Part 3" | February 18, 2014 | 201 | |
The True Hearts Day party arrives, and Duchess is determined to ruin it. Meanwhile, Ashlynn is having second thoughts about breaking up with Hunter, and a misunderstanding causes Raven to believe she has lost her chance with Dexter.
| 20 | 5 | "Class Confusion" | March 4, 2014 | 202 | |
When Raven signs up for Princessology, Apple decides to take a villain's class.
| 21 | 6 | "Apple's Birthday Bake-Off" | March 18, 2014 | 204 | |
On Apple's birthday, the other students hold a cake-baking contest to celebrate, and Briar is determined to make sure Apple gets everything she wants, even if it means poisoning Raven's contest submission.
| 22 | 7 | "The Beautiful Truth" | April 1, 2014 | 206 | |
Cedar, Apple, and Briar participate in a beauty pageant to show the school what true beauty is.
| 23 | 8 | "MirrorNet Down" | April 15, 2014 | 207 | |
Dexter and his friends try to find out why the MirrorNet has crashed when they have to finish an important quiz or risk getting detention.
| 24 | 9 | "Rebel's Got Talent" | April 29, 2014 | 208 | |
Raven and Sparrow compete for a slot playing guitar in the school's talent show.
| 25 | 10 | "Once Upon a Table" | May 13, 2014 | 209 | |
Blondie critiques the Wonderland Haberdashery and Tea Shop.
| 26 | 11 | "Blondie Branches Out" | May 27, 2014 | 216 | |
Cupid inspires Blondie to make an honest family tree project.
| 27 | 12 | "Poppy the Roybel" | June 10, 2014 | 217 | |
Poppy, the younger twin of Holly, arrives at Ever After High, but cannot decide where she belongs.
| 28 | 13 | "O'Hair's Split Ends" | June 24, 2014 | 214 | |
Poppy learns she and Holly were switched at birth.
| 29 | 14 | "Maddie's Hat-Tastic Party" | July 8, 2014 | 205 | |
When Wonderland Grove starts losing its magic, Maddie hosts a tea party to restore its wonder and madness.
| 30 | 15 | "Lizzie Hearts' Fairytale First Date" | July 22, 2014 | 210 | |
To win a bet with Sparrow, Daring must get a date with Lizzie Hearts.
| 31 | 16 | "Apple's Princess Practice" | August 8, 2014 | 213 | |
Apple spends the day helping her future subjects.
| 32 | 17 | "Lizzie Shuffles the Deck" | August 19, 2014 | 218 | |
Briar inspires Lizzie to break away from her mother's strict rules.
| 33 | 18 | "Duchess Swan's Lake" | September 2, 2014 | 211 | |
Duchess enlists Ashlynn and Hunter to save her beloved lake from pollution.
| 34 | 19 | "Cerise's Picnic Panic" | September 16, 2014 | 215 | |
Cerise and her parents make plans to have a forest picnic, only for Hunter to interject.
| 35 | 20 | "Kitty's Curious Tale" | October 2, 2014 | 224 | |
The narrators try to determine whether Kitty is a Royal or a Rebel.
| 36 | 21 | "Cupid Comes Clean... Kinda" | October 16, 2014 | 223 | |
Cupid tries to bring Raven and Dexter together.
| 37 | 22 | "And The Thronecoming Queen is..." | November 25, 2014 | 219 | |
The votes are in, and one of the four queen candidates will receive the crown.
| 38 | 23 | "Best Feather Forward" | December 23, 2014 | 222 | |
Humphrey Dumpty helps Duchess with a singing class that Duchess is terrible at.

=== Chapter 3 (2015) ===
| No. overall | No. in chapter | Title | Original release date | Prod. code | Refs |
|---|---|---|---|---|---|
| 39 | 1 | "Ginger in the BreadHOUSE" | January 5, 2015 | 221 | |
Ginger, daughter of the Candy Witch, gets a little help from Raven when she tries to prove to everyone that she just wants to bake for everyone.
| 40 | 2 | "Ashlynn's Fashion Frolic" | March 13, 2015 | 220 | |
Ashlynn's fashion show is disrupted by her stepsisters.
| 41 | 3 | "An Hexclusive Invitation" | March 27, 2015 | – | |
Ashlynn gets an invitation to the exclusive Blue Moon Forest Fest, but Faybelle Thorn, daughter of the Dark Fairy, is only looking forward to causing trouble.
| 42 | 4 | "Chosen with Care" | April 10, 2015 | – | |
Ashlynn decides whom to invite to the Forest Fest, and Cupid is down in the dumps when Dexter works up the nerve to ask Raven out right in front of her.
| 43 | 5 | "Just Sweet" | April 24, 2015 | – | |
Daring helps Dexter on what to do and say on his date with Raven, while Blondie gives Raven dating tips.
| 44 | 6 | "Through the Woods" | May 8, 2015 | – | |
Ashlynn and Cupid head to the Forest Fest with Blondie and Poppy while Faybelle plots her revenge for not being invited.
| 45 | 7 | "Baking and Entering" | May 22, 2015 | – | |
Lost in the Dark Forest, the girls look for a place to find a snack.
| 46 | 8 | "Date Night" | June 5, 2015 | – | |
Dexter and Raven go out to the movies while battling first date jitters.
| 47 | 9 | "Driving Me Cuckoo" | June 19, 2015 | – | |
Learning that their friends are lost, Raven and the others hitch a ride to the Dark Forest in Baba Yaga's magical hut.
| 48 | 10 | "Bog Bash" | July 3, 2015 | – | |
One of Faybelle's tricks leads the girls to a grumpy troll on their continuous quest to the Forest Fest.
| 49 | 11 | "Faybelle's Choice" | July 17, 2015 | – | |
Faybelle reveals her deception when the girls finally reach the Enchanted Forest.
| 50 | 12 | "The Legacy Orchard" | July 31, 2015 | – | |
The students read yearbooks of Ever After High's alumni in a magical orchard.
| 51 | 13 | "Sugar Coated" | September 4, 2015 | – | |
When the bake sale runs into some trouble, Raven attempts to help the cooking class with a spell that doesn't go as expected.
| 52 | 14 | "Fairest on Ice" | September 18, 2015 | – | |
Poppy tries skating for the first time and ends up on a wild ride with Duchess.
| 53 | 15 | "Heart Struck" | October 2, 2015 | – | |
Hunter gets his hands on Cupid's bow and arrows, and causes an outbreak of lovesickness.
| 54 | 16 | "Bunny + Alistair 4 Ever After" | October 16, 2015 | – | |
Brooke tries to narrate the perfect scene for Alistair and Bunny's first kiss.
| 55 | 17 | "Croquet-Tastrophe!" | November 13, 2015 | – | |
Lizzie proposes that Apple and Raven settle their dispute over the yearbook with a croquet match.
| 56 | 18 | "Save Me, Darling!" | November 27, 2015 | – | |
When a dragon attacks, Darling finds her chance to be the hero.
| 57 | 19 | "Rosabella's Animal Rescue" | December 4, 2015 | – | |
The animal friends have vanished, and Rosabella is determined to find them.
| 58 | 20 | "What's in the Cards for Courtly Jester?" | December 11, 2015 | – | |
Courtly gives some details about her new start at Ever After High.
| 59 | 21 | "Tri-Castle-On" | December 25, 2015 | – | |
After winning the end-of-year sporting event, Cerise, Hunter and Lizzie's talents are called upon to save the yearbook ceremony.

=== Chapter 4 (2016) ===
| No. overall | No. in chapter | Title | Original release date | Prod. code | Refs |
|---|---|---|---|---|---|
| 60 | 1 | "Moonlight Mystery" | April 7, 2016 | – | |
Justine Dancer's ballet slippers are mysteriously ruined.
| 61 | 2 | "Wish List" | April 22, 2016 | – | |
The students join together to make Farrah Goodfairy's dream come true.
| 62 | 3 | "A Tale of Two Parties" | May 6, 2016 | – | |
Ashlynn and her girlfriends are forced to attend two celebrations at once.
| 63 | 4 | "Piping Hot Beats" | May 20, 2016 | – | |
After Melody Piper makes a mess in class, it's up to her music to solve the problem.
| 64 | 5 | "Thumb-believable!" | June 3, 2016 | – | |
A cancelled school field trip won't shrink Nina Thumbell's thirst for adventure!
| 65 | 6 | "Beanstalk Bravado" | June 17, 2016 | – | |
Jillian Beanstalk helps Humphrey overcome his fear of heights.
| 66 | 7 | "Meeshell comes out of her Shell" | September 9, 2016 | – | |
Ashlynn, Briar and Maddie befriend the shy new girl, Meeshell Mermaid.
| 67 | 8 | "There's No Business Like Snow Business" | September 23, 2016 | – | |
Apple and Maddie go on a tour of the winter factory in Crystal Winter's palace.
| 68 | 9 | "A Big Bad Secret!" | October 7, 2016 | – | |
Ramona Badwolf returns to Ever After High, and resumes her rivalry with Cerise.

== Specials ==
In addition to the regular webisodes, Ever After High has released several feature-length presentations and compilation episodes.

| No. | Title | Runtime | Original release date |
|---|---|---|---|
| S1 | "Legacy Day: A Tale of Two Tales" | 23 minutes | December 15, 2013 |
Includes three webisodes: "Apple's Tale: The Story of a Royal", "Raven's Tale: The Story of a Rebel" and "The Tale of Legacy Day".
| S2 | "True Hearts Day" | 23 minutes | February 9, 2014 |
Includes three webisodes: ("True Hearts Day - Part 1", "True Hearts Day - Part 2" and "True Hearts Day - Part 3") Duchess is determined to earn a higher position in the royal rankings and finds a perfect opportunity to do that by blackmailing Ashlynn and threatening to reveal her 'romantic secret'. Meanwhile, Cupid is secretly planning a True Hearts Day party alongside Briar without the permission of Headmaster Grimm.
| S3 | "Thronecoming" | 45 minutes | November 2, 2014 |
When Raven is tricked to sign the Storybook of Legends, the girls find out that the Storybook of Legends is a fake, thanks to Cedar. The girls must find the real book through Headmaster Milton Grimm's forgotten brother, Giles, but instead seek out the spell to break the Riddlish curse placed on him. On the other hand, Briar learns that her destiny might not be as perfect as she thinks, and finds the Storybook of Legends under her room floor. Frightened and confused, she dumps it down the Well of Wonder, where it ends up in Wonderland. Things are about to get topsy-turvy now...
| S4 | "Spring Unsprung" | 47 minutes | February 6, 2015 |
When the Storybook of Legends is found by Alistair Wonderland and Bunny Blanc, the two friends decide to bring the book back to Ever After High, but the Cheshire Cat has other plans for the book and swaps it with a book of cursed riddles instead, that turn all who read it topsy-turvy with their wild magic, one of whom is Apple, who thus threatens to destroy the fairytale world. Now, with only Maddie, Alistair, Lizzie, Bunny and Kitty left, they must solve the malicious riddle of the Cheshire Cat, and save their friends.
| S5 | "Way Too Wonderland" | 4 episodes of 24 minutes each | August 14, 2015 |
When Raven uses her magic to try to break the curse on Wonderland, her magic accidentally transport the girls to Wonderland High. The girls must survive one day in Wonderland High against wicked Vice-Principal Courtly Jester in order to save Lizzie's mother from a coup d'état. But things in Wonderland are not what they seem, and magic is about to get out of hand...
| S6 | "Dragon Games" | 4 episodes of 24 minutes each | January 29, 2016 |
Dragons return to Ever After High, and so does the Evil Queen. When the most epic competition and evil scheme starts at Ever After High, Raven and Apple must let go of their story conflict and save their beloved school together.
| S7 | "Epic Winter" | 4 episodes of 24 minutes each | August 5, 2016 |
Crystal Winter's royal father, the Snow King, was placed under an evil curse that will turn the fairytale world into eternal winter. Crystal and her friends must lift the curse and save ever after from eternal winter.
