= List of All Grown Up! episodes =

All Grown Up! is an American television series that ran on Nickelodeon from April 12, 2003 to August 17, 2008.

== Series overview ==
Season	Episodes	Originally released	
Season	Episodes	First released	Last released
Pilot special		July 21, 2001	
1	15	April 12, 2003	August 28, 2004
2	10	June 4, 2004	February 12, 2005
3	10	December 7, 2004	July 16, 2005
4	10	October 10, 2005	November 20, 2007
5	10	November 21, 2007	August 17, 2008

== Episodes ==
=== Pilot special (2001) ===
Before the series began production, an hour-long episode of Rugrats entitled "All Growed Up" was aired in 2001 as the franchise's 10th anniversary special. Following its ratings success, Nickelodeon would pick-up a spin-off series in 2002 based on the special. On June 27, 2004, this episode would later be packaged as an episode alongside the rest of the series, being labeled with the production code of No. 998.

Title	Directed by	Written by	Original release date	Prod. code	Viewers (millions)
"All Growed Up"	Louie del Carmen & Jim Duffy	Kate Boutilier & Eryk Casemiro	July 21, 2001	141–142	11.91
"All Growed Up"	Louie del Carmen & Jim Duffy	Kate Boutilier & Eryk Casemiro	June 27, 2004 (Note: in-series repackaging)	998	N/A
The Rugrats are now ten years older, and in school, where they attend a concert.

=== Season 1 (2003–04) ===
No. overall	No. in season	Title	Directed by	Written by	Original release date	Prod. code	Viewers (millions)
1	1	"Susie Sings The Blues"	Jim Duffy	Sheila M. Anthony	November 29, 2003 (Note: This episode was first released on Growing Up Changes Everything VHS/DVD on August 26, 2003.)	001	2.77 (Note: (with viewers aged 2–11))
Ten years after the events of Rugrats, a talent scout offers Susie the chance to become a pop star, provided she can cover the $1,000 cost of recording a demo. Susie convinces her older sister Alisa to lend her some money she has been saving for a house, but after paying the scout she discovers she has been conned. Completely devastated, she vows never to sing again but is encouraged by her friends to perform at a talent night at Chas and Betty's café, the Java Lava. Meanwhile, Chuckie decides that he is tired of playing it safe and decides to reinvent himself as a risk-taker. With Tommy's help he pulls off a series of pranks which land him in trouble with Vice Principal Pangborn, who the boys discover is a closet poet and inadvertently encourage him to read some of his works at the Java Lava.: In production order, this is the season premiere.
2	2	"Coup DeVille"	Michael Daedalus Kenny	Joe Purdy	April 12, 2003	002	2.32
Lil is invited to a party with all of the popular kids from school, provided her brother Phil does not come with her. This newfound attention prompts her to want more independence from her twin, while Phil struggles with not having Lil in his life. When the other kids make fun of Phil at the party, she stands up for him, realizing how close to her brother she really is. Meanwhile, Chuckie struggles to complete the President Fitness Test and resents the embarrassment of gym class, taking a stand by faking illnesses and hiding out in the boys' bathroom.: In airing order, this is the season premiere.
3	3	"Chuckie's in Love"	Andrei Svislotski	Peter Hunziker	January 10, 2004 (Note: This episode was first released in Canada on October 10, 2003.)	003	2.11
Chuckie has a crush on Nicole Boscerelli, but she does not notice him. He goes to Kimi for help on changing his image to get Nicole to notice him and they create an alter ego for him as foreign exchange student, Chongo. Despite Tommy telling him that doing so can only lead Nicole to like the fictional Chongo, Chuckie is so convinced that he can keep the charade going until he is resorted to changing between Chongo and himself while Nicole is at the Java Lava. Meanwhile, Angelica becomes a reporter on the school newspaper and after a report on the weird cafeteria food causes students to avoid it altogether, the school's chef Pepe attempts to make new food that ends up making the whole school sick, with Angelica to blame.
4	4	"Bad Kimi"	Ron Noble	Story by : Scott Gray & Monica Piper; Teleplay by : Scott Gray	November 29, 2003 (Note: This episode was first released in Canada on October 24, 2003.)	004	5.17
Chuckie is concerned when Kimi hits it off with school bad boy Z, roping the gang into investigating Z which leads them to believe he is a thief. When they try to tell Kimi she is unmoved and sneaks off, eventually found helping Z load merchandise into a truck. Chuckie confronts Z about being a thief and Kimi explains that he has actually been raising money for charity. Kimi is initially angry at Chuckie not being trusting, but Z encourages Kimi to forgive him as he was only looking out for her. Meanwhile, Angelica reluctantly lets Harold take over her online advice chat for the night. Harold finds he enjoys helping people and Susie helps him set up a rival online chat, which proves more popular until the emotional burden becomes too much for Harold and he decides to give it up in favor of Angelica's.
5	5	"Truth or Consequences"	Michael Daedalus Kenny	Story by : Tom Frykman & Cathy Ladman; Teleplay by : Erin Ehrlich	November 29, 2003 (Note: This episode was first released in Canada on November 7, 2003.)	005	5.22
Tommy enters a film contest which is to be judged by his favorite director, Martin Costomiris, but after his attempt to make a sci-fi film starring his friends does not work, he is drawn to their secret conversations they have unaware were being filmed. Despite Dil's objections, Tommy starts recording more of his friends in secret, who all, except for Chuckie, become outraged and they refuse to talk to Tommy if he intends to enter their private moments into the competition. In the end, Tommy re-cuts the film with bloopers from his first attempt at making a movie and clips of the gang as babies, this time showing them in a more positive and proud light. Meanwhile, vice principal Pangborn spends time observing and analysing Dil's behaviour and recommends to Stu and Didi that Dil have some counselling. Didi is outraged that Pangborn would consider that for her son and praises Dil for seeing the world differently. Dil is later reassured by Didi that she thinks his personality is what makes him wonderful and Pangborn learns that being different is not all that bad.
6	6	"Thief Encounter"	Andrei Svislotski	Erin Ehrlich	December 6, 2003 (Note: This episode was first released in Canada on November 14, 2003.)	006	3.29
While the gang are under stress about the upcoming Standardized Test, Betty and Chas set up a neighbourhood watch to catch the thief who has been stealing from gardens. Dil is suspected when stolen stuff keeps turning up in the Pickles' house but when he tries to take the heat off by returning what was stolen he is caught by Betty and everyone believes him to be the culprit. The real thief turns out to be Tommy, who has been sleepwalking under stress preparing for the test. Meanwhile, Angelica becomes a mentor to a toddler with a similar personality to herself at that age. All this stresses Angelica, who upon Susie's advice, falsely threatens to spill out a supposedly bad secret the girl has kept unless she writes a good review.
7	7	"River Rats"	Ron Noble	Joe Purdy	December 13, 2003 (Note: This episode was first released in Canada on November 21, 2003.)	007	N/A
Betty and Chas take Tommy, Chuckie, and Phil white-water rafting. It is discovered that Tommy is not the big brave hero that everyone thinks he is as he has aquaphobia, a fear of water. But he confronts his fear when he saves Phil after he slides down a cliffside and falls into the water.
8	8	"It's Cupid, Stupid"	Michael Daedalus Kenny	Sheila M. Anthony	February 14, 2004 (Note: This episode was first released in Canada on February 8, 2004.)	008	4.2 (Note: This number is the rating as a part of the rating/share this episode received with children aged 9–14.)
Dil makes friends with the new boy Lil' Q, guest star Lil' Romeo, a hacky sacker whose hacky sack has a similar effect to cupid's arrow. He first hits Nicole, who Chuckie is planning to ask to the upcoming Valentine's Day dance, causing her to fall in love with Tommy, which leads to a fall out between him and Chuckie. Lil' Q tries to undo this mistake but instead hits Sean Butler, a boy Angelica wants to ask her to the dance, and he falls in love with Susie. Lil' Q then hits Z, who also falls in love with Susie and he and Sean argue over who is taking her to the dance, upsetting Kimi who wanted Z to ask her. At the dance Lil' Q and Dil fix all of the problems: Nicole asks Chuckie to dance and Z asks Kimi, but when they hit Sean with the hacky sack nothing happens and Angelica orders him to dance anyway. Phil asks Tommy to dance with Lil so he can get a snack, but is himself pulled away by Susie so she can dance with him.
9	9	"The Old & The Restless"	Andrei Svislotski	Peter Hunziker	January 24, 2004	009	2.38
Grandpa Lou chaperons Tommy's class field trip to the Human Body Museum. Tommy becomes embarrassed, because Lou is quite slow as he is a lot older now than he used to be, so they do not get to do everything there is at the museum and he keeps telling old stories, which no one finds interesting. Sean and Tommy sneak off and Sean makes them go to a part of the museum that is out of bounds. They get trapped and Lou saves them in a way that reminds Tommy of some of the war stories that he had told him. Tommy then forgives Lou for embarrassing him. Meanwhile, Dil has to go to hospital with a burping disorder.
10	10	"Tweenage Tycoons"	Ron Noble	Story by : Scott Gray & Erin Ehrlich; Teleplay by : Scott Gray	November 29, 2003	010	4.92
The gang are out to buy concert tickets for their all-favorite group, The Sulky Boys. But the asking price for tickets are a whopping $100! After seeing the attention Dil is getting over his Belt-quarium (a belt with a fish inside) they recruit him to invent products they can sell to raise the cash. The need for new ideas causes Dil to have a breakdown and puts a strain on his and Tommy's relationship when he feels like he is being used. Angelica, also trying to earn money for the spring st. Patrick's concert herself, copies all of Dil's inventions but her duplicates do not sell as well.
11	11	"Tommy Foolery"	Michael Daedalus Kenny	Story by : Joe Purdy & Monica Piper; Teleplay by : Joe Purdy	March 27, 2004	011	N/A
The kids prank Dil into thinking aliens have contacted him and they are speaking to him through Tommy. Meanwhile, Angelica schemes to be paired with Sean at the Spring Fling school dance class.
12	12	"Lucky 13"	Andrei Svislotski	Sheila M. Anthony	August 28, 2004 (Note: This episode was first released in Canada on March 28, 2004.)	012	3.25
Angelica is turning 13 and having a big bash to celebrate. But she does not want any 'dweebs' there, and that includes her pre-teen cousins and Rugrats pals. But, her party and Savannah's big bash collide on the same day, so who will they go to? Dil is obsessed with porpoise.
13	13	"Brother, Can You Spare The Time?"	Ron Noble	Monica Piper	January 17, 2004	013	N/A
When Tommy wins the National Junior Director's Chair Award, the recognition and attention he receives concerns Dil that he and Tommy are growing apart. Tommy becomes annoyed when Dil keeps trying to spend more time with him and the two end up on the live TV talk show What's Your Tragedy?, where Dil admits to Tommy that he is ashamed of being different and that he fears losing Tommy as he is the only one who understands him. Tommy reassures Dil he will never stop caring about him and he should not be ashamed of who he is. Meanwhile, everyone else is planning a surprise party for Tommy to celebrate his win. The gang try to coach Chuckie, who has a hard time lying, to keep it a secret and enlist Angelica to help him. Chuckie becomes a decent liar, but he later decides that he prefers telling the truth.
14	14	"Interview With A Campfire (Part 1)"	Ron Noble & Michael Daedalus Kenny	Erin Ehrlich	June 25, 2004	014	2.04
Camp Everwood seems like the perfect opportunity for Tommy's horror movie to take flight, especially when they learn the curse of Camp Everwood.
15	15	"Interview With A Campfire (Part 2)"	Ron Noble & Michael Daedalus Kenny	Erin Ehrlich	June 25, 2004	015	2.04
When people start to go missing, Tommy and the gang go into the woods to figure out just what happened on that same soil, over 100 years ago.

=== Season 2 (2004–05) ===
No. overall	No. in season	Title	Directed by	Written by	Original release date	Prod. code
16	1	"Bad Aptitude"	Andrei Svislotski	Scott Gray	June 4, 2004	016
The gang all take an aptitude test to get a clue as to what career they should take up. Tommy dismisses his results, which tell him to become a businessman, but after his new film is not well received he decides to give up his dream of becoming a director and joins the school's business group, BLEC. The others begin exploring their suggested careers: Chuckie becomes a dare devil, Lil becomes a wedding planner, Phil becomes a male model, Dil becomes a public speaker and Kimi becomes a film critic.
17	2	"Saving Cynthia"	Ron Noble	Sheila M. Anthony	October 2, 2004	017
Angelica gets a new design for her room. However, the Cynthia doll is missing as her mother, Charlotte, accidentally misunderstood her when she told her to get rid of "all the toys". Now that Angelica realizes that she misses Cynthia, she goes out to find her. After getting in trouble, Tommy and Chuckie have to water Pangborn's plant, but end up destroying his PDA.
18	3	"Fools Rush In"	Jim Duffy	Peter Hunziker	June 5, 2004	018
A 13-year-old girl, Francine who seeks revenge on Tommy. At first he does not know why, but then Lil and Kimi convince Tommy that Francine has a crush on him. When he finds out that Francine did not have a crush on him, she humiliates him even more (along with Dil's numerous failed attempts of saving him). In the end it becomes apparent that she was only humiliating him because he had cut her scene in one of his films. Once they discuss the misunderstanding they become friends. Meanwhile, Angelica tries to increase her website's popularity with embarrassing and humiliating pictures of people.
19	4	"Memoirs of A Finster"	Michael Daedalus Kenny	Erin Ehrlich	June 12, 2004	019
Chuckie and Kimi initially agree to work together on their family tree project, however Kimi realizes she knows nothing about her Japanese heritage and decides to do a separate project on her biological family's side. The Finster family support Kimi in exploring her ancestry, leading to them embarrassing themselves in front of the school when Kimi has them perform a traditional dance at the school's culture festival. The more time Kimi spends embracing Japanese culture the more Chuckie feels she does not want to be a part of her adoptive family. After realising how important Chas and Chuckie are to her, she includes the Finster line on her family tree. Meanwhile, Tommy meets a new kid called Trevor who behaves a lot like him to emulate his popularity.
20	5	"Miss Nose It All"	Andrei Svislotski	Story by : Erin Ehrlich, Monica Piper, & Krista Tucker; Teleplay by : Krista Tucker	June 17, 2004	020
Angelica has been invited to one of Savannah's parties, and must find a dress that she has not already worn. While working at the hospital she trips and breaks her nose. Not wanting to be seen by anyone, because she has a cast on her nose she fakes having a crazy illness after seeing it on a drama on the hospital television. She then meets a small boy in the hospital, who has greater problems than herself and sees that she is being selfish by pretending to be ill so that she can stay in the hospital and not be seen by Savannah and her friends. Meanwhile Tommy, Chuckie, Phil, Lil, and Kimi help Miss O'Keefe to make a tranquility garden.
21	6	"Runaround Susie"	Ron Noble	Monica Piper	July 17, 2004	021
Susie is forced to choose between singing at the TV Talent Show and leading her school's language team to victory in the language bowl (due to her newfound talent for linguistics), which is held on the same day. Meanwhile, Lil makes Phil pose as her to tell a nerdy boy, Geoffrey, that she does not like him.
22	7	"The Science Pair"	Michael Daedalus Kenny	Peter Hunziker	November 6, 2004	022
For the school's upcoming science fair, Tommy has an idea to create a machine that can sort socks by color to prevent wearing odd socks. After asking his dad, Stu, for a little advice, Stu becomes a little too helpful and takes over so much that Tommy has to admit that the project is no longer his design at the prize-giving event. Meanwhile, Lil has a crush on an idiot named Nicholas, who asks to work with her on her science project.
23	8	"Izzy or Isn't He?"	Zhenia Delioussine	Erin Ehrlich	November 27, 2004	023
Chuckie runs for School Safety Commissioner. Dil's new alien friend, Izzy, despite being imaginary becomes popular with the kids in school and is nominated for Safety Commissioner too. Behind in popularity to Izzy, get into Chuckie asks his friends to help him win, but even they are backing Izzy. Chuckie becomes annoyed that everyone, even his friends would rather have an imaginary Safety Commissioner than him, then becomes the target of everyone's ire when he supposedly runs over Izzy while mowing the lawn.
24	9	"Project Chuckie"	Andrei Svislotski	Monica Piper	November 27, 2004	024
Angelica tries to help Chuckie become more popular for her school project, but it backfires when he takes her advice, and he becomes more popular than her. Meanwhile, Tommy writes a play for the school's history assembly and casts Phil, Lil, Kimi, and Dil to play people in history.
25	10	"Fear of Falling"	Ron Noble	Erin Ehrlich	February 12, 2005 (Note: This episode was first released on All Grown Up...And Loving It DVD on January 11, 2005.)	025
On a trip to a mountain resort, Tommy develops his first crush on a girl named Olivia, another guest at the lodge. Chuckie becomes a third wheel, and feels alienated when Tommy prefers spending time with Olivia instead of helping him overcome his fear of heights. Tommy has his very first kiss with Olivia. Meanwhile, Angelica tries to impress a guy who works as a hiking leader at the resort.

=== Season 3 (2004–05) ===
No. overall	No. in season	Title	Directed by	Written by	Original release date	Prod. code
26	1	"Dude, Where's My Horse? (Part 1)"	Michael Daedalus Kenny	Erin Ehrlich	July 16, 2005	026
As babies, the Rugrats used to dream about being cowboys and cowgirls, and they get to live out their dream.
27	2	"Dude, Where's My Horse? (Part 2)"	Andrei Svislotski	Erin Ehrlich	July 16, 2005	027
When the gang is invited to spend a week at a dude ranch, Tommy and his friends try to adapt to country life.
28	3	"Blind Man's Bluff"	Ron Noble	Adam Cohen	April 11, 2005	028
When Susie gets a gig singing at Slosh Mountain, "the world's coolest water park", she gives free tickets to Tommy and his friends. The kids are thrilled, not so much about the show, but about getting the chance to go on the mother of all rides, Whiplash Gorge. Unfortunately, Tommy and Dil soon learn they have to look after Grandpa Boris after cataract surgery on exactly the same day. Dil convinces Tommy to take Boris with them to Slosh Mountain, but they lose him.
29	4	"Yu-Gotta-Go"	Michael Daedalus Kenny	Norm Gunzenhauser	April 12, 2005	029
The whole school is taken over by a role-playing card game, Yu-Gotta-Go (A parody of Yu-Gi-Oh!), except Chuckie. When he finally starts playing it becomes an obsession and, unable to afford new cards, he agrees to do chores for Angelica, who has been grounded by her mother for running up the phone bill. Determined to own a rare and expensive card called "The Red Mirror Dragon", Chuckie turns to more desperate and distressing measures to pay for it.
30	5	"Curse of Reptar"	Zhenia Delioussine	Denise Moss	April 13, 2005	030
After Stu sells an invention, he tells the kids that he is planning to buy them a swimming pool in the backyard. While digging up the yard, the construction crew unearths the Rugrats' old mechanical Reptar toy from the 1990s. The kids fondly remember it (all of them except for Dil), but decide to throw it away, until, during an electrical storm, they become convinced that they have angered Reptar. They ultimately decide to rescue the toy, and realize that, although they are growing up, they cannot forget their past.
31	6	"It's Karma, Dude!"	Andrei Svislotski	Lisa Albert	April 14, 2005	031
When Angelica signs up for a talent show, Tommy tells her to let Susie know, but only leaves a message on the Carmichaels' malfunctioning answering machine and Susie misses her chance to sign up. Angelica's face breaks out in zits, the others tell her it might be some form of karmic retribution for not letting Susie sign up. Guilt-ridden and experiencing worse and worse luck Angelica seeks help, Dil for tells her to do good deeds, but when the zits get bigger she finally rectifies the situation by letting Susie take her place in the talent show instead. Meanwhile, when nobody signs up for Miss O'Keats' part of the show, Chuckie, Phil and Lil's attempts to console her backfire when she ropes them all into participating.
32	7	"The Big Score"	Ron Noble	Erin Ehrlich	April 15, 2005	032
It is soccer season, and as per usual, Phil has soccer on the brain. But when Lil casually joins the team, she surprises everyone, including herself, by instantly becoming a super star, much to Phil's dismay. Meanwhile, Dil becomes the new mascot.
33	8	"Rats Race"	Andrei Svislotski	Norm Gunzenhauser	June 21, 2005	033
Tommy, Chuckie, Phil, and Dil decide to put together a boxcar to compete in the upcoming derby against Angelica.
34	9	"The Finster Who Stole Christmas"	Michael Daedalus Kenny	Adam Cohen	December 7, 2004	034
As the holiday season approaches, Chuckie is dreading another forgettable Christmas. To liven things up, he mistakenly steals a great tree to replace the lame one his dad has picked out. When he discovers that the whole community is after the thief, he hatches a plan to rectify the situation. Meanwhile, Tommy and Dil write a Hanukkah song.
35	10	"Wouldn't It Be Nice?"	Ron Noble	Denise Moss & Norm Gunzenhauser	June 24, 2005	035
Susie thinks that Angelica does not think much about the future. While Angelica worries about getting a navel piercing, Susie tries to get a scholarship to a good college. The girls get lost during a school trip and Susie loses her laptop with all of her work on that she needs to show to a college. Meanwhile, Tommy, Phil, Lil, and Dil skip school so that Lil can get an autograph from her favorite soccer player.

=== Season 4 (2005–07) ===
No. overall	No. in season	Title	Directed by	Written by	Original release date	Prod. code
36	1	"Separate But Equal"	Zhenia Delioussine	Erin Ehrlich	November 12, 2007	036
As Phil and Lil's birthday nears, the twins realize that they are more different from each other than they think. Phil is getting to like girls, and Lil is wearing a pink training bra. After a shocking incident, they decide to have separate parties for the boys and the girls as they try to out-prank each other. Meanwhile, Dil is worried that he might turn into a vampire after getting bitten what he thinks is a vampire bat.
37	2	"Ladies Man"	Ron Noble	Norm Gunzenhauser	November 13, 2007	037
Susie trains Harold to help him get a date with Angelica. He soon becomes the most wanted boy in school. Meanwhile, Dil tries to play Cupid himself as he helps Vice Principal Pangborn woo Miss O'Keats.
38	3	"Lost at Sea"	Michael Daedalus Kenny	Sheila M. Anthony	November 14, 2007	038
Angelica falls for Darryl, but she gets too nervous to talk to him whenever he is around. Her mom loses her CEO job and decides to become a full-time mom. Then, they get stranded together on a sail boat on the same day as Darryl's rock concert. Meanwhile, Tommy decides to invite Rachel for dinner with his family, but is worried it will go wrong and she will dislike his family.
39	4	"Rachel, Rachel"	Andrei Svislotski	Adam Cohen	November 25, 2006	039
Tommy attends a Hebrew school to prepare for his bar mitzvah. While there, he meets Rachel, and falls deeply in love with her. After a while he lies and says that his father, Stu is a rabbi but at the Hebrew School Picnic Rachel finds out and they find out they are both working on the same house. Note: This is the only All Grown Up episode that has premiered in 2006.
40	5	"O Bro, Where Art Thou?"	Zhenia Delioussine	Erin Ehrlich	November 15, 2007	040
Tommy is getting annoyed by Dil's eccentric behavior, and he wants more space. When the gang visits Cirque Extravaganza Day Camp, Dil meets a family who are just as eccentric as he is who invite him to join their troupe permanently.
42	6	"Rat Traps"	Ron Noble	Norm Gunzenhauser	November 16, 2007	041
When the gang sneaks into a PG-13 movie at the mall, Angelica catches them, and she has excellent blackmail fodder. The mall then closes with them locked inside with two robbers. Chuckie imitates the main character of the movie they just saw and saves the day.
42	7	"In The Family's Way"	Michael Daedalus Kenny & Dean Criswell	Sheila M. Anthony	November 19, 2007	042
When Angelica is outraged when Charlotte and Drew have to cancel their vacation to Hawaii, they decide that Angelica could use more discipline and have her stay with Susie's family for a week. The rest of the gang all bet on how long she can handle the Carmichael family rules. Angelica has trouble adjusting early on but is spurred on by the bet and starts doing all the family chores. Not wanting to lose the bet, Kimi and Lil encourage Susie and her brothers to give Angelica more, harder chores to do, which leads to Angelica falling off the roof of the house. Meanwhile, Charlotte and Drew initially enjoy having "silence" in the house, but Dil shows up to "fill the void" left by Angelica. Throughout his stay, he gets them to play his original game "Impatience", which causes them to get very frustrated with the game's rules and realise they miss Angelica. Angelica comes home and surprises her parents with what she learned from the Carmichaels, cooking them a family dinner.
43	8	"R.V. Having Fun Yet? (Part 1)"	Zhenia Delioussine	Denise Moss	October 10, 2005	043
Susie gets chosen to sing at a giant parade in New York City. The gang opts to travel to New York cross country -- by R.V..
44	9	"R.V. Having Fun Yet? (Part 2)"	Andrei Svislotski	Denise Moss	October 10, 2005	044
After some unfortunate events happen after time on the road, the kids begin to crack.
45	10	"A DeVille House Divided"	Ron Noble	Denise Moss & Norm Gunzenhauser	November 20, 2007	045
Phil has a crush on Lil's best friend and soccer teammate Wally they start hanging out more often, making Lil feel out of the loop. So Lil develops a plan to pull them apart. Phil and Wally's relationship falls apart when Lil tells Wally that he does not like her. When Phil finds out that Lil lied to Wally, he becomes upset at his sister. Meanwhile, Dil brought him his new friend to Tommy and Chuckie who happens to be Principal Pangborn's nephew.

=== Season 5 (2007–08) ===
No. overall	No. in season	Title	Directed by	Written by	Original release date	Prod. code
46	1	"Susie Goes Bad Lite"	Michael Daedalus Kenny & Dean Criswell	Sheila M. Anthony	November 21, 2007	046
Tired of being considered a "goody goody" by the popular kids, Susie tries desperately to prove that she can be a bad girl. Meanwhile, Phil discovers that he has a talent for cooking.
47	2	"Golden Boy"	Zhenia Delioussine	Erin Ehrlich	August 17, 2008	047
When Tommy forgoes going to the traditional opening day ball game outing with his Grandpa, Lou takes Dil instead. This makes Tommy jealous as he and Dil compete to be Grandpa's favourite grandson during a fishing trip. Meanwhile, Drew and Stu want to get rid of Lou's car because it's so old and seems to be worthless, but they soon learn that the car belonged to Elvis and was very valuable.: This is the only episode Chuckie is absent in, making Tommy the only character to appear in every episode.; In airing order, this is the series finale.
48	3	"Trading Places"	Andrei Svislotski	Denise Downer; Scott Malchus & Harry Harootunian (based on an idea)	November 23, 2007	048
When Kimi starts acting out, Chuckie believes it's because she hates how her room looks. The gang decides to redesign it for her while Angelica keeps Kimi busy with Dil giving feng shui advice, which goes ignored. Chuckie later provides Kimi reassurance when she explains what was making her so emotional: that her father did not send her anything for Children's Day and fears he no longer cares about her. Chas and Kira, who have been telling the children they have been taking dance lessons, were in fact arranging a big surprise for Kimi.
49	4	"TP+KF"	Ron Noble	Adam Cohen	November 26, 2007	049
The gang are preparing for what may be their last Halloween trick-or-treating. While trying on their costumes in the Finster's garage they find TP+KF carved on the wall, leading Chuckie to believe that Tommy has a crush on Kimi. The argument between Tommy and Chuckie escalates to where their friendship falls apart. After the rest of the gang's attempts to bring them back together fail, including the reveal that it was Kimi who carved the initials, they eventually make up when Chuckie saves Tommy from middle school goons. Meanwhile, Chas has a new security system to scare away anyone who might want to T.P. ("toilet paper") his house and Dil goes trick-or-treating the day before to beat the rush, but only gets money and becomes annoyed.
50	5	"Super Hero Worship"	Dean Criswell	Norm Gunzenhauser	November 27, 2007	050
When a comic book starring Chuckie's favorite superhero Armadillo Dave gets cancelled, he becomes too depressed to help Tommy with his science fair project. Tommy has to buy a rat for his project, but the last rat available is a mean one that scares everybody. Kimi makes Tommy a simple one lane track for his rat, much to his disappointment as he feels he would get a failing grade for it, but needs Chuckie so he can get a good grade on it since Chuckie has done it before. The gang tries to find Chuckie a new hero to worship.
51	6	"What's Love Got To Do With It?"	Zhenia Delioussine	Denise Moss	November 28, 2007	051
Angelica's teacher is having a baby so she brings in a hot handsome substitute teacher that Angelica falls for and tries to date by failing her assignments. Meanwhile, Tommy, Phil, and Chuckie are part of the tennis club run by Pangborn. Chuckie is trying to avoid showering at the boys' locker room, but when he takes the chance, he realizes he has nothing to worry about.
52	7	"All Broke Up"	Ron Noble	Erin Ehrlich	November 29, 2007	052
Tommy's girlfriend, Rachel is moving away, and he is cool with it, but is not sure why. However, his friends think otherwise, believing him to be in denial. Tommy tries going about his life as normal, but everyone keeps trying to show him compassion, annoying him greatly. Tommy is advised by Dil to go along with the plan so his friends will leave him alone. However, when Tommy hooks up with another girl, the gang unexpectedly have Rachel show up to surprise Tommy. Seeing him with another girl so soon is too much for her to bear, so she walks away again, leaving Tommy to cry for real this time. Chuckie then shows up at Tommy's house to comfort him.
53	8	"Petition This!"	Dean Criswell	Sheila M. Anthony	November 30, 2007	053
While preparing for her parents' tenth wedding anniversary with Chuckie, Kimi leads a petition drive to ban cell phones in school. To prevent having phones banned, Angelica hoodwinks Chuckie into helping her keep them with a rival petition, while Susie helps Kimi counteract. A debate on the issue between Kimi and Chuckie at a school assembly turns personal – in particular when Chuckie reveals Kimi asked for a cell phone for Christmas – and they stop speaking to each other. Their feud boils over to the anniversary party until Tommy shows a video of their parents' wedding when they were babies, which brings them to tears and they make up.
54	9	"Brothers Grimm"	Andrei Svislotski	Norm Gunzenhauser	August 10, 2008	054
When Tommy's gang's parents feel that they are spending too much time watching TV, they ban it from the house. So to get their televisions back, they do something dare-devilish. They make a tree house with a zip-line in the backyard to scare and anger their parents into giving them their TV back.
55	10	"Bad Blood"	Zhenia Delioussine	Adam Cohen	August 3, 2008	055
With Stu and Didi away at an Invention Convention, Dil wants to host a viewing party for a "real" alien autopsy video with Tommy. But when both Grandpa Lou and Grandpa Boris show up to babysit the kids, they all start to have a feud. This gets even more difficult when Phil, Lil, and Chuckie show up and Dil invites ten other kids to come see it, much to Tommy's frustration.: In production order, this is the series finale.
