= All Grown Up! =

American animated comedy-drama television series

- Also known as: Rugrats: All Grown Up!
- Genre: Comedy drama; Teen drama; Animated sitcom
- Based on: Rugrats by: Arlene Klasky; Gábor Csupó; Paul Germain
- Developed by: Kate Boutilier; Eryk Casemiro; Monica Piper
- Showrunners: Arlene Klasky; Gábor Csupó
- Written by: Kate Boutilier; Shelia M. Anthony; Monica Piper; Eryk Casemiro; Scott Gray; Erin Ehrlich; Peter Hunziker; Joe Purdy
- Directed by: Andrei Svislotski; Zhenia Delioussine; Ron Noble; Louie del Carmen; Jim Duffy
- Creative directors: Michael Daedalus Kenny; Jim Duffy
- Voices of: E. G. Daily; Tara Strong; Nancy Cartwright; Cheryl Chase; Kath Soucie; Cree Summer; Dionne Quan
- Theme music composer: Mark Mothersbaugh; Bob Mothersbaugh
- Opening theme: "All Grown Up with You" performed by Cree Summer
- Ending theme: "All Grown Up with You" (Instrumental)
- Composer: Mark Mothersbaugh
- Country of origin: United States
- Original language: English
- No. of seasons: 5
- No. of episodes: 55 (list of episodes)

Production
- Executive producers: Arlene Klasky; Gábor Csupó; Eryk Casemiro
- Producers: Klasky Csupo: Cella Nichols Harris (Note: Supervising producer); Jim Duffy; John Holmquist; Monica Piper; Pernelle Hayes; Kate Boutilier; Nickelodeon: Lora Lee
- Editor: Kate Boutilier
- Camera setup: Single-camera
- Running time: 23 minutes
- Production companies: Klasky Csupo; Nickelodeon Animation Studios

Original release
- Network: Nickelodeon
- Release: April 12, 2003 – August 17, 2008

Related
- Rugrats; Rugrats (2021 TV series)

All Grown Up! is an American animated television series developed by Kate Boutilier, Eryk Casemiro, and Monica Piper and produced by Klasky Csupo for Nickelodeon. It serves as a sequel to Rugrats, and explores the daily lives of protagonist Tommy Pickles, his little brother Dil, and his childhood friends, now tweens/adolescents. The concept for the series was based on the Rugrats episode "All Growed Up", which served as the original series' 10th anniversary special and proved successful with audiences.

The series ran from April 12, 2003 to August 17, 2008, for a total of five seasons and 55 episodes, and featured much of the surviving cast from the original series reprising their roles. Several episodes also feature flashbacks of the kids as toddlers.

== Premise ==
The series is set ten years after the events of Rugrats. Tommy, Chuckie, Angelica, the twins Phil and Lil, Susie, Dil, and Kimi are now tweens/teens. Episodes often involve the characters dealing with common issues of preteens and teenagers.

== Characters ==
=== Main ===
- Tommy Pickles (voiced by E. G. Daily) is now 11-years-old. Tommy has a full head of purple hair like his father, and is still the leader of the group. He has developed an interest in filmmaking and also inventing like his father. His friends still look up to him for advice when a certain situation gets out of control.
- Dil Pickles (voiced by Tara Strong) is Tommy's 10-year-old younger brother. He also shares his father's interest in inventing. He now has a full head of orange hair like his mother. Dil has unconventional habits, style, speech, interests, and beliefs. Although he is the youngest of the group, he is often the most insightful.
- Chuckie Finster (voiced by Nancy Cartwright) is still Tommy's 12-year-old best friend and is often shy and quite nervous. Despite often being the most serious of the group, he has developed a cheeky nature. He also has braces since he had buck teeth as shown in Rugrats which he will get off in "2.5 years", although that's never shown on the show at all.
- Phil DeVille (voiced by Kath Soucie) is Lil's twin brother. Phil is still very gross and mischievous, but he has shown talents in modeling and cooking.
- Lil DeVille (also voiced by Kath Soucie) is Phil's twin sister. The twins have developed their own unique personalities as preteens. Lil is something of a tomboy with a keen interest in and talent for soccer, although she still has more girly interests such as fashion and boys.
- Kimi Watanabe-Finster (voiced by Dionne Quan) is Chuckie's younger Japanese-American step-sister. Kimi is quite rebellious and also much into fashion, which she has a unique style for. She also embraces her Japanese heritage. She also has a big crush on Tommy.
- Angelica Pickles (voiced by Cheryl Chase) is Tommy and Dil's older cousin. Angelica starts the series as a preteen and later becomes a teenager in the season 1 episode "Lucky 13" by turning 13 years old. She is usually seen doing many typical "teen things" like getting a cell phone, pursuing boys, and keeping on top of the latest fashion trends. She is relentless in her pursuit of popularity and has still kept her original self-serving and bossy attitude towards the others, albeit much less than in the original series, as she now loves Tommy and his friends' company.
- Susie Carmichael (voiced by Cree Summer) is Angelica's best friend and sometimes rival. She is African-American, has developed a talent for singing and is still seen by Angelica and now her school peers as a "goody-goody" because she is working hard to achieve her perfection and is also talented at linguistics. She is also close friends with Kimi.

=== Recurring ===
- Harold Frumpkin (voiced by Pat Musick) is Susie and Angelica's friend since preschool. Harold is in love with Angelica and will do anything for her; although she enjoys this very much, she never shows him any romantic interest in return.
- Stu Pickles (voiced by Jack Riley) is Tommy and Dil's father. Stu is still a quirky inventor.
- Didi Pickles (voiced by Melanie Chartoff) are the boys' Mom and Stu's wife. Didi is now a child psychologist, who is very supportive of Dil's unique personality.
- Chas Finster (voiced by Michael Bell) is Chuckie's biological father and Kimi's legal adoptive father. Chas owns the Java Lava cybercafé, in which the kids often hangout, with his wife Kira and runs it with Betty.
- Kira Finster (voiced by Julia Kato) is Chas's Japanese wife, Kimi's biological mother, and Chuckie's stepmother.
- Betty DeVille (voiced by Kath Soucie) is the twins's mother. Betty operates the Java Lava with Chas and Kira.
- Howard DeVille (voiced by Philip Proctor) is the twins' father and Betty's husband. Howard is often seen as a shy house husband.
- Charlotte Pickles (voiced by Tress MacNeille) is a highly successful, businesswoman, Angelica's mother and Dil and Tommy's aunt. Although when Charlotte loses her job, she briefly becomes a full time housewife, before marketing a board game invented by Dil reignites her passion for business.
- Drew Pickles (voiced by Michael Bell) is a successful businessman, Angelica's father, Charlotte's husband, Stu's older brother and Dil and paternal Tommy's uncle.
- Lucy Carmichael (voiced by Hattie Winston) is a talented singer like her daughter, Susie. Lucy is still a pediatrician.
- Randy Carmichael (voiced by Ron Glass) is Susie's father and Lucy's husband. Randy is still a scriptwriter for the Dummi Bears.
- Lou Pickles (voiced by Joe Alaskey) is Tommy, Dil, and Angelica's paternal grandfather. Lou is still a big part of their childhood. His wife Lulu is mentioned, but has never been seen in the series.
- Boris Kropotkin (voiced by Michael Bell) is Tommy and Dil's maternal grandfather, Didi's father Boris is a Russian-Jewish immigrant to the United States.
- Minka Kropotkin (voiced by Melanie Chartoff) is Boris's wife, Didi's mother, and Tommy and Dil's maternal grandmother. She is also a Russian-Jewish immigrant.
- Estes Pangborn (voiced by Clancy Brown) is the vice-principal of the kids' school. A former pro wrestler whom the gang often runs afoul of, although he likes poetry which shows his sensitive side.
- Miss O'Keats (voiced by Ann Magnuson) is a troubled romantic; she is the theatre arts teacher at the kids' school who later dates Pangborn.

== Development and production ==
=== "All Growed Up" ===
The idea for All Grown Up! originated in "All Growed Up", a television special which aired in 2001 to celebrate the 10th anniversary of Rugrats and portrayed the original characters 10 years into the future. The special was nominated for "Outstanding Children's Program" in the 2002 Creative Arts Emmy Awards. The special was the highest rated Rugrats episode, the highest-rated Nickelodeon program, and cable's No. 1 show for the week ending July 22, 2001, with a 7.2 rating equivalent to 12 million viewers. Approximately 70% of all kids aged 2–11 tuned in to watch the special. Nickelodeon president, Herb Scannell, noted that a "Surprising numbers of kids held Rugrats parties on Saturday night and watched the show in groups". The following day, Nickelodeon said "'We've got to make this a show,' because of the size of the audience that came to it." Noting the immediate popularity of the show's concept, "All Growed Up" was deemed the network's equivalent of the Super Bowl. Nickelodeon made a two-season order of 35 episodes.

Nick's press releases for the Rugrats' 10th anniversary noted that the "All Growed Up" special was a "one time only" special. Nickelodeon was so impressed by the high ratings, they wanted to use the show as a pilot for either a regular spinoff series or a series of occasional one-hour specials. Nickelodeon decided to commission an entire series around the teenage main characters. Arlene Klasky explained "It got enormous ratings, so Nickelodeon blessed us with another series". Margie Cohn felt that Rugrats had endured prolonged success due to the "series' writing, and the appeal of the show's well developed characters to its deeply devoted audience", and argued the sequel resulted from fan support and speculation on how the characters would age.

While Nickelodeon executives were concerned that the new series would maintain the Rugrats appeal, they acknowledged a revision to the successful franchise was necessary as the original series was beaten in the ratings by shows such as SpongeBob SquarePants and The Adventures of Jimmy Neutron, Boy Genius. On October 16, 2001, a PC game based on the "All Growed Up" special was released. After release in the US & Canada, "All Growed Up" debuted on Canadian television by YTV, Rugrats' English broadcaster in Canada, on September 3, 2001. The French Canadian version, "Les Razmoket, Dix Ans Après", was broadcast in two parts on VRAK.TV, on December 1, 2001, and December 8, 2001. In Britain and Australia, the video was released as Older and Bolder, because a Rugrats video existed in those countries named All Growed Up. An "All Growed Up" book was also released.

=== Production ===
"[While] the original idea was based on my experiences with my own toddlers our audience has grown up with the show's characters, and they have said over the years they would love to see how the Rugrats grow up."

— Rugrats co-creator Arlene Klasky

Nickelodeon ordered 13 episodes, to be created by Rugrats animation studio Klasky Csupo for production in September 2002. All Grown Up! was intended as the first Rugrats spinoff as others were under consideration. The series premiered with its first episode, Coup DeVille, on April 12, 2003, following the Nickelodeon Kids' Choice Awards. By November 2003, Rugrats was no longer in production. In 2004, Rugrats and All Grown Up! were aired concurrently to highlight the characters in two stages of their lives. All Grown Up! aired twice per week.

The new episodes shifted from the 11-minute Rugrats format of two stories per episode, to a single 22-minute story. This was to allow "more time to develop and tell a story and see where the characters go with it". Each of the episodes focused on the life of a main character and usually showed the characters facing a lot of firsts for tweens and teenagers. The show included gradual stylistic changes, with the first 15 episodes similar to the "All Growed Up" special and the original Rugrats world. The second set of 10 episodes and onward had a more contemporary look, with characters being given "hipper" clothing. Over the 3 seasons of 35 episodes, the developers hoped for a gradual evolution in style to where the audience will be comfortable with the changes. The main cast recorded their parts for each episode in about one hour. By November 24, 2003, 15 episodes began airing while 10 more episodes were in the scripting stage.

== Episodes ==
Season	Episodes	Originally released	
Season	Episodes	First released	Last released
Pilot special		July 21, 2001	
1	15	April 12, 2003	August 28, 2004
2	10	June 4, 2004	February 12, 2005
3	10	December 7, 2004	July 16, 2005
4	10	October 10, 2005	November 20, 2007
5	10	November 21, 2007	August 17, 2008

=== Special episodes / television films ===
- All Growed Up (2001)
- Interview With A Campfire (2004)
- Dude, Where's My Horse? (2005)
- R.V. Having Fun Yet? (2005)

=== Casting and the evolution of characterization ===
"[The show's concept] meant abandoning many of the conventions and stylistic traits of the original, such as the idea that the babies can communicate with each other but not with the adults. Also, the visual trademark of seeing things through the low-to-the-ground point of view of an infant."

— The Los Angeles Times

The existing cast modified their voices for their characters' new ages. Tommy's voice actress, E.G. Daily, noted "It was a little harder when we were doing the first batch of episodes, when they were just coming in and trying to define everybody and how they've grown". Susie's character changes included having "a little more sass, a little less innocence and a little more bottom end". All Grown Up! attracted 30 million viewers a month, including a large number of 12 to 14-year-olds. The producers did not delve into the "characters' loss of innocence" with topics such as sex and drugs in favor of issues relevant to 9 to 11-year-olds, the show's target demographic. While the producers did not take the teen approach with All Grown Up!, they did with another Klasky Csupo series, As Told by Ginger.

Executive producer Arlene Klasky stated "It was always in the back of our minds that we would love to see what these characters were like as they grew". Susie's voice actor, Cree Summer, noted that while part of the appeal to this kind of TV show is not growing up, she noted a natural evolution of the show after 12 years on the air. Daily said that while her character was still the star of the show, he was older, wiser, and using more contemporary language. Cyma Zarghami, Nickelodeon's executive vice president and general manager at the time, said "The tween special proved kids are ready to embrace these beloved characters in a whole new realm. The Rugrats property is 11 years old, so it feels just right to have the babies turn into tweens in their 12th year on the air". On the evolution of Angelica, Marjorie Cohn, executive vice president for development and original programming at Nickelodeon explained: ''She's the center of the universe, and she keeps bumping up against forces that tell her she's not. The writers mellowed Angelica and her voice actress addressed "I welcome the new development in her character, the way she can be vulnerable. She's getting some real acting challenges from the material the writers are coming up with". She compared her role to Bart Simpson's voice actress who will likely play the 10-year-old until retirement, noting that now she could play the same character with a "bit more sophistication". She's become more vulnerable and has to learn to navigate the social strata of junior high". The potential for more sophisticated storytelling was one of the factors in the creation of the series. The show's creators thought that "pushing the show to the next age bracket" would be an effective way of "holding on to viewers who have grown up with Rugrats". Daily stated: "I'm definitely going to miss doing [baby Tommy], but it's awesome watching people grow."

=== Other proposed spin-offs ===
Comparison in design style between Rugrats (left) and All Grown Up! (right)

At the Television Critics Association tour in July 2001, Nickelodeon executives mentioned that "All Growed Up" was one of three spinoff concepts proposed by Nickelodeon to continue the successful Rugrats franchise. In 2002, Nickelodeon aired the episode "Pre-School Daze", the pilot for a series in which Angelica and Susie attend preschool. According to Variety in September 2002, the show was to be repurposed as a series of four standalone specials. The series aired in the UK in 2005, then in the United States in late 2008 after the cancellation of the series. Another proposed spinoff was a series featuring Susie and the Carmichael family, who would move from California to Atlanta, Georgia; it was first proposed for the 1999–2000 television season, but Nickelodeon and Klasky-Csupo decided instead to concentrate on all the original-aged Rugrats. The Kwanzaa special, which aired in 2001, served as a pilot for this new series, but the series would have contradicted the established continuity.

In the 12th episode of All Grown Up!, "Lucky 13", Angelica becomes a teenager. When asked if the popularity of that episode would produce a spinoff as the characters enter teendom, Nickelodeon executives explained: "It has been talked about but said the network had no immediate plans to push the entire cast into puberty", though noted that those connected with the franchise were "eager to continue developing the characters". The premiere was preceded by a six-hour marathon of Angelica-centered episodes of Rugrats and All Grown Up!. Angelica's voice actor Cheryl Chase expressed a desire to take part in any spin-off of Rugrats, from Angelica Goes to College to Rugrats in the Nursing Home. In 2003, Cohn proposed that Rugrats characters play the leads in adaptations of classic fairy tales for Nickelodeon.

=== Premieres with other networks ===
A preview show premiered on April 12, 2003, before its regular run began on May 23, 2003. More than 5.2 million viewers watched the regular run, being in 2nd place behind an NFL game on ESPN, and making it the highest-rated premiere on Nickelodeon to date. The show aired in reruns on "Nick on CBS" for six months from March 13, 2004, to September 11, 2004. In addition, in its first season, All Grown Up! had its first of two celebrity guest stars: Lil Romeo as "Lil Q" (Cupid) in episode eight, "It's Cupid, Stupid". The German broadcast premiered on August 21, 2006, on Nick and Kids WB!. All Grown Up! premiered one new episode on November 25, 2006 before the remaining episodes aired unannounced from November 12, 2007 to August 17, 2008.

== Reception ==
The debut show was in the top 15 ratings spots. Common Sense Media felt that the show's scenarios were not as good as in the original series, commenting that they were "thoughtfully crafted" but lacked the satiric take of babies misunderstanding the adult world. Rather, the show was choosing to tackle more standard pre-teen themes. The Los Angeles Times stated it was "a revolutionary idea" for a series with characters perpetually stuck in their status quo. Image felt All Grown Up! was the "natural progression of the show". GamesRadar+ felt it was an "ill-advised venture". Comic Book Resources commented "The sense of adventure and exploration of the original had been lost, those special personalities they had as babies vanished in a haze of pre-pubescent insecurities", though felt it was a "fun 'what-if'". New York University argued the show did not pursue the character's progression with a sense of accuracy. The Gamer thought it was a "terrible excuse for a sequel". Chicago Tribune wrote that in the new series, Angelica has "become an overbearing teen, still bossing around Tommy and his chums".

Rugrats co-creator/co-writer Paul Germain (who left Klasky Csupo in 1993) disliked All Grown Up!. Since the original series was about babies who do not understand the world, he felt that if the characters are older, then the story is finished. He additionally stated "What I would have said to people at the time if I had been asked, was I would have said, 'If you make them teenagers, there is no Rugrats, you're wasting your time'".

== Merchandise ==
=== VHS and DVD releases ===
A total of twelve All Grown Up! DVDs have been released. The following is a chart providing information about each DVD:

All Grown Up! home video releases
Season	Episodes	Years active	Release dates		
Season	Episodes	Years active	Region 1	Region 2	Region 4
1	15	2003–04	Volume 1: August 26, 2003; Episodes: "Susie Sings The Blues" • "Coup DeVille" Volume 2: Lucky 13: August 31, 2004; Episodes: "Lucky 13" • "Tweenage Tycoons" Volume 3: O'Brother!: November 16, 2004; Episodes: "Brother, Can You Spare the Time" • "Tommy Foolery" Volume 4: All Grown Up... And Loving It!: January 11, 2005; Episodes: "It's Cupid, Stupid" • "Chuckie's in Love" Volume 5: Interview with a Campfire: April 5, 2005; Episodes: "Interview With a Campfire" Nick Picks Vol. 1: May 24, 2005; Episodes: "Lucky 13" Nick Picks Vol. 2: October 18, 2005; Episodes: "Interview With A Campfire"	Volume 1: Growing Up Changes Everything: November 8, 2004; Episodes: "Susie Sings The Blues" • "Coup DeVille" Volume 2: Lucky 13: September 5, 2005; Episodes: "Truth or Consequences" • "Thief Encounter" • "Tweenage Tycoons" • "Lucky 13" Volume 3: O'Brother!: November 7, 2005; Episodes: "Bad Kimi" • "The Old & The Restless" • "Tommy Foolery" • "Brother, Can You Spare the Time" Volume 4: All Grown Up... And Loving It!: February 13, 2006; Episodes: "Chuckie's in Love" • "It's Cupid, Stupid" The Best of Nickelodeon: Summer Adventures: June 5, 2006; Episodes: "River Rats" Volume 5: Interview with A Campfire: July 27, 2006; Episodes: "River Rats" • "Interview With A Campfire"	Volume 1: Growing Up Changes Everything: September 15, 2005; Episodes: "Susie Sings The Blues" • "Coup DeVille" Volume 2: Lucky 13: September 15, 2005; Episodes: "Truth or Consequences" • "Thief Encounter" • "Tweenage Tycoons" • "Lucky 13" Volume 3: O'Brother!: November 17, 2005; Episodes: "Bad Kimi" • "The Old & The Restless" • "Tommy Foolery"• "Brother, Can You Spare the Time" Volume 4: All Grown Up... And Loving It!: March 30, 2006; Episodes: "Chuckie's in Love" • "It's Cupid, Stupid" The Best of Nickelodeon: Summer Adventures: June 5, 2006; Episodes: "River Rats" Volume 5: Interview with A Campfire: September 29, 2006; Episodes: "River Rats" • "Interview With A Campfire" Season 1: April 1, 2015 The Complete Series: 2018; Episodes: Entire season featured
2	10	2004–05	Volume 4: All Grown Up... And Loving It!: January 11, 2005; Episodes: "Saving Cynthia" • "Fear of Falling" Volume 5: Interview with a Campfire: April 5, 2005; Episodes: "Bad Aptitude" Volume 7: R.V. Having Fun Yet?: October 11, 2005; Episodes: "The Science Pair"	Volume 4: All Grown Up... And Loving It!: February 13, 2006; Episodes: "Saving Cynthia" • "Fear of Falling" Volume 5: Interview with a Campfire: July 27, 2006; Episodes: "Bad Aptitude"	Volume 4: All Grown Up... And Loving It!: March 30, 2006; Episodes: "Saving Cynthia" • "Fear of Falling" Volume 5: Interview with a Campfire: September 29, 2006; Episodes: "Bad Aptitude" Season 2: April 1, 2015 The Complete Series: 2018; Episodes: Entire season featured
3	10	2004–05	Volume 6: Dude, Where's My Horse?: July 26, 2005; Episodes: "Dude, Where's My Horse?" Nick Picks Vol. 3: February 7, 2006; Episodes: "Dude, Where's My Horse?" Nick Picks Holiday: September 26, 2006; Episodes: "The Finster Who Stole Christmas"	N/A	Season 3: June 3, 2015 The Complete Series: 2018; Episodes: Entire season featured
4	10	2005–07	Volume 7: R.V. Having Fun Yet?: October 11, 2005 Episodes: "R.V. Having Fun Yet?" Nick Picks Vol. 4: June 6, 2006; Episodes: "R.V. Having Fun Yet?"	N/A	Season 4: September 1, 2015 The Complete Series: 2018; Episodes: Entire season featured
5	10	2007–08	N/A	N/A	Season 5: September 1, 2015 The Complete Series: 2018; Episodes: Entire season featured

=== Books ===
All Grown Up! led to a wide range of books being published. The following is a list of all of the books that were published:

- Ask Angelica!
- What's with Dad?
- Chuckie's Ghost
- Cookie Crisis!
- It's About Time
- The Scavenger Hunt
- Welcome to Fifth Grade!
- Boys vs Girls
- Angelica for President
- Coolest Girl In School

=== Video game ===
All Grown Up: Express Yourself is a video game for the Game Boy Advance, developed by Altron and published by THQ. Released in 2004, the plot involves Angelica completing an assignment for the school newspaper. The game is a compilation of mini-games that are linked by a series of eight missions. There is a PDA mode with a To Do list that collects events and places for each day.
