= Juno Baby =

American Toy Company

Juno Baby was a multiple Emmy Award winning line of children's educational-development products that blend original music with puppet characters. The product line focuses around the characters of Juno, a six-year-old girl with a natural passion for music, her two-year-old brother Rai Rai, and several animal companions. The company has two brands: Juno Baby which is geared toward the toddler and infant market and Juno Jr. and the world of Harmonia Springs which focuses on pre-school aged children.

The brand was founded by Belinda Takahashi PhD, a professional composer, professor and Adam Adelman in 2003 after the two found themselves disappointed by the lack of music-focused children's educational material. They officially launched the brand in 2004, and won more awards than any other children's media company in the country. The following year, the company expanded its line of DVDs and CDs to include toys, books, and apparel. The company's first book, Juno's Musical ABCs, was narrated by Brooke Shields. Juno Baby signed a partnership deal with FAO Schwarz with the announcement of their pre-school brand, Juno Jr. along with other retailers such as Buy Buy Baby and Toys "R" Us. In June 2010 the company launched their One For All program, which donates one of their products to the Head Start Program for every Juno Baby product purchased. and signed a licensing deal with Cookie Jar Entertainment's licensing arm, CPLG and a television partnership with CCI to broadcast the Juno Jr. series.

== Characters ==
- Juno: The titular character who is a little girl wearing a red dress with the initial "J" on it. Her catchphrase is "Buglebugs! and she waves the baton." Voiced by Belinda Takahashi.
- Rai Rai: Juno's little brother who is a baby wearing a diaper and a blanket tied around his neck resembling a cape and he plays the xylophone and a triangle. He does not speak complete sentences in his baby voice. Portrayed by Raiden Adelman, the son of Takahashi and Adelman.
- Indie: A cat who is friends with Juno. "A charming companion, excellent at crossword puzzles, loved his teddy bear, take long naps, played the french horn and prefers warm milk and cookies at teatime." Voiced by Adam Adelman.
- Bunny - A bunny who is pink, wears a necklace, and has a hair clip on one of her ears, wear hats and she plays the violin. Voiced by Belinda Takahashsi and Leila Gerstein
- Murphy - A caterpillar who is Juno's friend. He plays the bassoon. Voiced by Adam Adelman.
- Buzz - A bee who is Juno's friend. He plays the flute. Voiced by Adam Adelman.

== Juno Baby releases ==
=== DVD ===
- Juno's Wonderful Day
- Way To Go, Juno!
- Indie’s Great Teddy Bear Hunt
- Juno’s Rhythm Adventure
- One Bunny Band (Juno Jr.)
- The Day the Music Stopped (Juno Jr.)

=== CD ===
- Juno Baby: Sing Along Edition
- Juno Baby: Orchestral Edition
- Juno Baby: Super Duper Deluxe Edition!
- Juno Baby: Spanish Version
- Juno Jr Welcome to Harmonia Springs: Sing Along Edition
- Juno Jr Welcome to Harmonia Springs: Orchestral Edition
- Juno Jr Welcome to Harmonia Springs: Super Duper Deluxe Edition
- Juno Jr Welcome to Harmonia Springs: Spanish Version

=== iOS ===
- Juno's Musical ABCs (2010)
- The Day the Music Stopped (2011)
- Juno's Piano (2011)
- Juno's Music Learning Adventure (2011)

=== Awards ===
- 2006 Dr. Toy Top 10 Award
- 2006 iParenting Media Award
- 2007 Parent's Choice Award
- 2007 Creative Child Preferred Choice Award
- 2007 Emmy Award Winner – Best Original Music
- 2010 Emmy Award Winner – Best Original Music and Best Children's Program
- 2010 NAPPA Gold Award
- National Parenting Publications Awards – Gold NAPPA Award
- 2007 Telly Award, Way to Go, Juno!

=== Books ===
- Juno's Musical ABCs
- The Day the Music Stopped

=== Other products ===
- Apparel line of the Juno Baby characters
- Plush line of the Juno Baby characters

=== Business ===
The founders sold Juno Baby, LLC in 2009 and was renamed The Juno Company, Inc. The founders continued to work with the company for two more years building out the brand Juno Jr.

After new ownership took on too much debt and pushed the company into bankruptcy, the founders re-purchased the assets in 2012. The company has since went quiet and has not released anything since.

=== Television ===
Juno Baby and Juno Jr. was reinstated for broadcast on BabyFirst TV on 31 March 2014, after a nearly one-year hiatus. but stopped airing it in 2015 and removed it from their website and was replaced by Honk, Toot & Swoo-Swoosh.
