= Andrei Svislotski =

Ukrainian animator (1960–2022)

Andrei Svislotski (Ukrainian: Андрій Свислоцький; 3 June 1960 – 19 December 2022) was a Ukrainian animator. He worked on numerous shows including Curious George, Aaahh!!! Real Monsters, and Rugrats. In 1995, he was nominated for a Daytime Emmy for Aaahh!!! Real Monsters and in 2014 was nominated for another for directing Curious George.
