= List of Billboard number-one dance/disco singles of 1984 =

The Dance/Disco Top 80 was a chart published weekly by Billboard magazine in the United States, which ranked the popularity of dance singles in nightclubs across the country, based on a national survey of club disc jockeys.

== Chart history ==
Issue date	Song	Artist	Reference(s)
January 7	"Say It Isn't So"	Daryl Hall and John Oates	
January 14	"Say It Isn't So"	Daryl Hall and John Oates	
January 21	"Trommeltanz (Din Daa Daa)"	George Kranz	
January 28	"Trommeltanz (Din Daa Daa)"	George Kranz	
February 4	"White Horse"	Laid Back	
February 11	"White Horse"	Laid Back	
February 18	"White Horse"	Laid Back	
February 25	"Beat Box"	Art of Noise	
March 3	"Beat Box"	Art of Noise	
March 10	"Let's Stay Together"	Tina Turner	
March 17	"Let's Stay Together"	Tina Turner	
March 24	"Girls Just Want to Have Fun"	Cyndi Lauper	
March 31	"Give Me Tonight"	Shannon	
April 7	"Give Me Tonight"	Shannon	
April 14	"I Want a New Drug"	Huey Lewis and the News	
April 21	"They Only Come Out at Night"	Peter Brown	
April 28	"Hold Me Now"	Thompson Twins	
May 5	"It's My Life"	Talk Talk	
May 12	"I Want It to Be Real"	John Rocca	
May 19	"Let's Hear It for the Boy"	Deniece Williams	
May 26	"Land of Hunger"	Earons	
June 2	"Dance Hall Days"/ "Don't Let Go"	Wang Chung	
June 9	"Tell Me I'm Not Dreamin' (Too Good to Be True)"	Jermaine Jackson and Michael Jackson	
June 16	"Tell Me I'm Not Dreamin' (Too Good to Be True)"	Jermaine Jackson and Michael Jackson	
June 23	"Tell Me I'm Not Dreamin' (Too Good to Be True)"	Jermaine Jackson and Michael Jackson	
June 30	"When Doves Cry"/ "17 Days"	Prince	
July 7	"When Doves Cry"/ "17 Days"	Prince	
July 14	"When Doves Cry"/ "17 Days"	Prince	
July 21	"When Doves Cry"/ "17 Days"	Prince	
July 28	"When Doves Cry"/ "17 Days"	Prince	
August 4	"When Doves Cry"/ "17 Days"	Prince	
August 11	"Breakin'... There's No Stopping Us"	Ollie & Jerry	
August 18	"The Glamorous Life"	Sheila E.	
August 25	"The Glamorous Life"	Sheila E.	
September 1	"High Energy"	Evelyn Thomas	
September 8	"Caribbean Queen (No More Love on the Run)"	Billy Ocean	
September 15	"The Mexican"	Jellybean	
September 22	"No Favors"	Temper	
September 29	"Let's Go Crazy"/ "Erotic City"	Prince and the Revolution	
October 6	"The Medicine Song"	Stephanie Mills	
October 13	"Swept Away"	Diana Ross	
October 20	"Swept Away"	Diana Ross	
October 27	"I Feel for You"	Chaka Khan	
November 3	"I Feel for You"	Chaka Khan	
November 10	"I Feel for You"	Chaka Khan	
November 17	"Out of Touch"	Daryl Hall and John Oates	
November 24	"Out of Touch"	Daryl Hall and John Oates	
December 1	"Big in Japan"	Alphaville	
December 8	"Big in Japan"	Alphaville	
December 15	"Like a Virgin"	Madonna	
December 22	"Like a Virgin"	Madonna	
December 29	"Like a Virgin"	Madonna	

== See also ==
- 1984 in music
- List of Billboard Hot 100 number ones of 1984
