= List of Billboard number-one dance/disco singles of 1986 =

Billboard magazine compiled the top-performing dance singles in the United States on the Hot Dance/Disco Club Play chart and the Hot Dance/Disco 12-inch Singles Sales chart. Premiered in 1976, the Club Play chart ranked the most-played singles on dance club based on reports from a national sample of club DJs. The 12-inch Singles Sales chart was launched in 1985 to compile the best-selling dance singles based on retail sales across the United States.

== Charts history ==
Chart history
Issue date	Hot Dance/Disco Club Play		Hot Dance/Disco 12-inch Singles Sales		Ref.
Issue date	Title	Artist(s)	Title	Artist(s)	Ref.
January 4	"Baby Talk"	Alisha	"I Like You"	Phyllis Nelson	
January 11	"Go Home"	Stevie Wonder	"I Like You"	Phyllis Nelson	
January 18	"Go Home"	Stevie Wonder	"I Like You"	Phyllis Nelson	
January 25	"Love's Gonna Get You"	Jocelyn Brown	"Love's Gonna Get You"	Jocelyn Brown	
February 1	"Slave to the Rhythm"	Grace Jones	"Love's Gonna Get You"	Jocelyn Brown	
February 8	"No Frills Love"	Jennifer Holliday	"Living In America"	James Brown	
February 15	Colonel Abrams (all cuts)	Colonel Abrams	"Living In America"	James Brown	
February 22	Colonel Abrams (all cuts)	Colonel Abrams	"Living In America"	James Brown	
March 1	"If You Should Ever Be Lonely"	Val Young	"Saturday Love" (Remix)	Cherrelle featuring Alexander O'Neal	
March 8	"If You Should Ever Be Lonely"	Val Young	"Saturday Love" (Remix)	Cherrelle featuring Alexander O'Neal	
March 15	"If You Should Ever Be Lonely"	Val Young	"Saturday Love" (Remix)	Cherrelle featuring Alexander O'Neal	
March 22	"I'm Not Gonna Let You"	Colonel Abrams	"What Have You Done For Me Lately"	Janet Jackson	
March 29	"I Can't Wait"	Nu Shooz	"Saturday Love" (Remix)	Cherrelle featuring Alexander O'Neal	
April 5	"I Can't Wait"	Nu Shooz	"Kiss" (Remix) / "♥ or $"	Prince and the Revolution	
April 12	"Kiss"	Prince and the Revolution	"Kiss" (Remix) / "♥ or $"	Prince and the Revolution	
April 19	"Kiss"	Prince and the Revolution	"Kiss" (Remix) / "♥ or $"	Prince and the Revolution	
April 26	"Whenever You Need Somebody"	O'Chi Brown	"Kiss" (Remix) / "♥ or $"	Prince and the Revolution	
May 3	"West End Girls"	Pet Shop Boys	"Kiss" (Remix) / "♥ or $"	Prince and the Revolution	
May 10	"West End Girls"	Pet Shop Boys	"Kiss" (Remix) / "♥ or $"	Prince and the Revolution	
May 17	"Say It, Say It"	E. G. Daily	"On My Own"	Patti LaBelle & Michael McDonald	
May 24	"What I Like"	Anthony and the Camp	"On My Own"	Patti LaBelle & Michael McDonald	
May 31	"What I Like"	Anthony and the Camp	"On My Own"	Patti LaBelle & Michael McDonald	
June 7	"What I Like"	Anthony and the Camp	"On My Own"	Patti LaBelle & Michael McDonald	
June 14	"Jump Back (Set Me Free)"	Dhar Braxton	"The Finest"	The S.O.S. Band	
June 21	"Jump Back (Set Me Free)"	Dhar Braxton	"The Finest"	The S.O.S. Band	
June 28	"Baby Love"	Regina	"The Finest"	The S.O.S. Band	
July 5	"Baby Love"	Regina	"Rumors"/ "Vicious Rumors"	Timex Social Club	
July 12	"Sledgehammer"	Peter Gabriel	"Rumors"/ "Vicious Rumors"	Timex Social Club	
July 19	"Rumors" / "Vicious Rumors"	Timex Social Club	"Rumors"/ "Vicious Rumors"	Timex Social Club	
July 26	"Rumors" / "Vicious Rumors"	Timex Social Club	"Rumors"/ "Vicious Rumors"	Timex Social Club	
August 2	"Rumors" / "Vicious Rumors"	Timex Social Club	"Venus" (Remix)	Bananarama	
August 9	"Venus"	Bananarama	"Venus" (Remix)	Bananarama	
August 16	"Venus"	Bananarama	"Venus" (Remix)	Bananarama	
August 23	"Ain't Nothin' Goin' on But the Rent"	Gwen Guthrie	"Papa Don't Preach"	Madonna	
August 30	"Ain't Nothin' Goin' on But the Rent"	Gwen Guthrie	"Papa Don't Preach"	Madonna	
September 6	"Point of No Return"	Nu Shooz	"Two of Hearts"	Stacey Q	
September 13	"Down and Counting"	Claudja Barry	"Down and Counting"	Claudja Barry	
September 20	"When I Think of You"	Janet Jackson	"Down and Counting"	Claudja Barry	
September 27	"When I Think of You"	Janet Jackson	"Down and Counting"	Claudja Barry	
October 4	"When I Think of You"	Janet Jackson	"Down and Counting"	Claudja Barry	
October 11	"Gotta See You Tonight"	Barbara Roy	"Two of Hearts"	Stacey Q	
October 18	"Gotta See You Tonight"	Barbara Roy	"Two of Hearts"	Stacey Q	
October 25	"Human"	The Human League	"Human"	The Human League	
November 1	"Human"	The Human League	"Human"	The Human League	
November 8	"Human"	The Human League	"Human"	The Human League	
November 15	"Word Up!"	Cameo	"Human"	The Human League	
November 22	"Don't Leave Me This Way"	The Communards	"Human"	The Human League	
November 29	"I Can't Turn Around"	J. M. Silk	"Brand New Lover"	Dead or Alive	
December 6	"Brand New Lover"	Dead or Alive	"Brand New Lover"	Dead or Alive	
December 13	"Brand New Lover"	Dead or Alive	"Brand New Lover"	Dead or Alive	
December 20	"Control"	Janet Jackson	"Brand New Lover"	Dead or Alive	
December 27	"Control"	Janet Jackson	"Brand New Lover"	Dead or Alive	

== See also ==
- 1986 in music
- List of Billboard Hot 100 number ones of 1986
