= Tearing Down the Walls =

Tearing Down the Walls may refer to:

- Tearing Down the Walls (E. G. Daily album), 1999
- Tearing Down the Walls (H.E.A.T album), 2014
