= Cry Just a Little =

Cry Just a Little may refer to:

- "Cry (Just a Little)", by Bingo Players, 2011
- "Cry Just a Little" (E. G. Daily song), from the 1989 album Lace Around the Wound
- "Letting Go (Cry Just a Little)", by Qwote, 2012

== See also ==
- "Cry Just a Little Bit", 1983 song by British singer Shakin' Stevens
- "I Cry" (Flo Rida song), 2012, which samples the chorus of the Bingo Players song
