= No Favors =

No Favors may refer to:

- "No Favors" (Temper song), a 1984 single by Temper.
- "No Favors" (Big Sean song), a 2017 song by Big Sean.
