= Anthony and the Camp =

Anthony and the Camp is a dance music group led by producer Anthony Malloy. The group also consists of Crawford Peterson, Henley Goddard and Linden Aaron. Malloy, who already had a number-one hit on the Hot Dance Music/Club Play chart with his former group Temper, hit the top spot again with the Camp in 1986 with the song "What I Like".

"What I Like" spent three weeks at the top of dance charts and was ranked as the most successful dance single of 1986. It also briefly appeared on the U.S. R&B Singles chart, peaking at number eighty.

== See also ==
- List of number-one dance hits (United States)
- List of artists who reached number one on the U.S. dance chart

Preceded by "Say It, Say It" by E.G. Daily	"What I Like"; Billboard Hot Dance Club Play number-one single May 24 – June 7, 1986	Succeeded by "Jump Back (Set Me Free)" by Dhar Braxton
