= The Girl Most Likely (disambiguation) =

The Girl Most Likely is a 1958 film directed by Mitchell Leisen.

The Girl Most Likely may also refer to:

- "The Girl Most Likely" (song), a 1968 single by Jeannie C. Riley
- The Girl Most Likely (Claudja Barry album), a 1977 studio album by Claudja Barry
- Girl Most Likely, a 2012 film directed by Shari Springer Berman and Robert Pulcini
- The Girl Most Likely To..., a 1973 film directed by Lee Philips
