= Made in Hong Kong =

Made in Hong Kong may refer to:

- Products made in Hong Kong; see Manufacturing in Hong Kong
- Made in Hong Kong (film), 1997 Hong Kong film directed by Fruit Chan
- Made in Hong Kong (album), a 1981 album by Claudja Barry
- Made in Hong Kong (And in Various Other Places), a 2009 live album by Nightwish
