= Some People (E. G. Daily song) =

Single by E. G. Daily

from the album Lace Around the Wound
- B-side: "Are You There"
- Released: 1989
- Length: 4:08 (7" remix); 5:03 (album version); 6:23 (12" remix)
- Label: A&M
- Songwriters: Lotti Golden; Tommy Faragher
- Producers: Lotti Golden; Tommy Faragher

E. G. Daily singles chronology
"Mind over Matter" (1987)	"Some People" (1989)	"Heart Don't Lie" (1989)

Music video
- "Some People" on YouTube

"Some People" is a song by American singer E. G. Daily, released in 1989 as the lead single from her second studio album Lace Around the Wound. The song was written and produced by Lotti Golden and Tommy Faragher. It reached No. 33 on the US Billboard Hot Dance Club Songs and remained on the charts for five weeks.

A music video was filmed to promote the single. It was directed by David Kellogg and produced by Pam Tarr for Squeak Pictures. In August, Daily appeared on American Bandstand to perform "Some People" along with "Bad Water".

== Critical reception ==
Upon release, Billboard listed the song as a recommended dance choice, commenting: "Singer/actress returns with an appealing pop cut that surprisingly enough sports an engaging Staples Singers-ish vocal approach". Music & Media picked "Some People" as their "single of the week" on 12 August 1989 and wrote: "The debut single from Lace Around the Wound is one of the best AC pop songs this year. A cool, breezy number, that is supported by a tight production. Stylistically the song is similar to Robert Palmer's material from the late 70s and early 80s - gritty funk with a hard rock edge. The strong, sing-along chorus and sparse instrumentation add up to a subtle but genuinely radio-friendly song."

== Formats ==
7" single

1. "Some People (Remix)" - 4:07
2. "Are You There" - 3:42

12" single

1. "Some People (12" Remix)" - 6:19
2. "Some People (7" Remix)" - 4:15
3. "Some People (House Mix)" - 7:06
4. "Some People (Dub Version)" - 5:48

Cassette single

1. "Some People (Remix)" - 4:07
2. "Are You There" - 3:42

CD single (German release)

1. "Some People (7" Remix)" - 4:08
2. "Some People (12" Remix)" - 6:23
3. "Some People (House Mix)" - 7:07

CD single (US promo #1)

1. "Some People (House 7")" - 4:26
2. "Some People (7" Remix)" - 4:04

CD single (US promo #2)

1. "Some People (Remix)" - 4:06
2. "Some People (LP Version)" - 5:02

== Chart performance ==
Chart (1989)	Peak position
US Billboard Hot Dance Club Songs	33

== Personnel ==
- E. G. Daily - lead vocals, backing vocals
- Lotti Golden - backing vocals on "Some People"
- Tommy Faragher - keyboards, cymbal and backing vocals on "Some People"
- Michael Reid - guitar on "Some People"
- Danny Faragher - harmonica, trombone and trumpet on "Some People"
- Chris Eminizer - saxophone on "Some People"
- Davey Faragher - bass on "Some People"
- Bashiri Johnson - percussion on "Some People"
- Marshall Rohner, Michael Landau - guitar on "Are You There"
- John Van Tongeren - keyboards on "Are You There"
- Tim Landers - bass on "Are You There"
- Denny Fonghiezer - drums on "Are You There"
- Lenny Castro - percussion on "Are You There"

Production

- Lotti Golden - producer and mixing on "Some People"
- Tommy Faragher - producer, mixing, engineer and drum programming on "Some People"
- Barry Rudolph, Lance McVickar, Louis Scalise - engineers on "Some People"
- Michael R. Hutchinson - mixing and additional production on remixes of "Some People", mixing on "Are You There"
- Peter Schwartz - additional keyboards on remixes of "Some People"
- E. G. Daily - producer of "Are You There"
- Csaba Petocz, Joe Borja - engineers on "Are You There"
