= Dhar Braxton =

American singer

Dhar Braxton (born in Harlem Hospital Center, Manhattan, New York), is a female house music singer. In 1986, she had a #1 hit single on the US Hot Dance Music/Club Play chart with the song, "Jump Back (Set Me Free)." Braxton is not related to, nor a member of, The Braxtons singing group. She is the younger daughter of singer Byrdie Green. Braxton also recorded another single for Sleeping Bag Records titled "Illusions." She contributed on Chocolette's "E Street Beat" prior to starting her solo career. Braxton's recordings were licensed to 4th & B'way Records in the UK.

"Jump Back (Set Me Free)" was the only charting single for Braxton, staying on the dance chart for thirteen weeks, and hitting number one for two weeks. The single also peaked at #61 on the US R&B chart. Additional vocals for the single were provided by Chocolette.

Released on the Fourth and Broadway label, it entered the UK Singles Chart on 31 May 1986; it rose to a high of number 32, and remained in the charts for 8 weeks.

== See also ==
- List of number-one dance hits (United States)
- List of artists who reached number one on the U.S. dance chart

Preceded by "What I Like" by Anthony and the Camp	"Jump Back (Set Me Free)"; Billboard Hot Dance Club Play number-one single June 14, 1986 - June 21, 1986	Succeeded by "Baby Love" by Regina
