= Tearing Down the Walls (E. G. Daily album) =

Studio album by E. G. Daily
- Released: April 13, 1999
- Recorded: 1998–1999
- Genre: Pop; pop rock
- Length: 40:39
- Label: E. G. Daily Productions
- Producer: Brad Gilderman; Harvey Mason Jr.; E. G. Daily; Bernie Larsen

E. G. Daily chronology
Lace Around the Wound (1989)	Tearing Down the Walls (1999)	Changing Faces (2008)

Tearing Down the Walls is the third studio album by American singer, actress and musician, E. G. Daily, which was released in 1999.

== Background ==
Tearing Down the Walls was Daily's first album since 1989's Lace Around the Wound. After the end of her record deal with A&M, Daily focused on her voice acting career. Marking a return to music, Daily worked with Grammy-winning music veterans and producers Brad Gilderman and Harvey Mason, Jr. for the majority of Tearing Down the Walls, while "Pretty Baby" was produced by Bernie Larsen and Daily. Although the album didn't garner any commercial success, critical reception was favorable. To promote the album, Daily would perform live on July 18, 1999, at the Phoenix, Arizona stop of Sarah McLachlan's Lilith Fair, a travelling music festival tour that "showcases the best in women's pop music".

In 2007 Daily went on "The Changing Faces Tour", which celebrated the Tearing Down the Walls album, as well as the launch of her first two albums – Wild Child and Lace Around the Wound – available on iTunes that May. Additionally the first single "Don't Even Care" was reported for release on June 13, 2007, and this single was meant to be serviced to Mainstream/Top 40/Hot AC radio. The album was released nationwide again on September 18 with exclusive bonus tracks; "Home," "Earthlings," "Just for You" and "Tryin'". All songs were new material, although "Just for You" was a re-recorded version of the song that appeared on her 1985 debut album Wild Child.

The song "Breath of Heaven" is the album's only cover and was first recorded by Christian music/pop singer Amy Grant from her 1992 album Home for Christmas. On October 23, 2007, Daily released the song as an MP3 single via her own label E. G. Daily Productions. "All I Want" was written by Daily and Grammy-winning writer/producer John Shanks.

During October 2002, Daily was interviewed by Matt Cibula for Ink 19. Asked whether the album was personal, Daily replied: "All my records are. They're like diaries, you know? Some of the songs on that record were written before I had kids, some after, and some were written during my marriage. I don't know how to write songs that aren't personal." Speaking of the album, Daily said: "I was very particular with that record. I produced and released it, and I needed someone with good chops to co-produce it. I found Brad Gilderman, who is a great engineer and mixer. He worked on "When Will I See You Again." And he's done mixes for Babyface. Anyway, he was the guy who had mixed that track, and I had a really awesome time making that. I'd already rehearsed the band, so he was able to just come right in."

== Release ==
The album was independently released in early 1999 on CD in America only (on Amazon and record stores nationwide), via Daily's own label E. G. Daily Productions. The CD remains in print. During 2007, Daily released the album as an MP3 download on sites such as Amazon and iTunes via E. G. Daily Productions. Additionally, this coincided with the launch of the bonus track version of the album.

== Critical reception ==
Professional ratings
Review scores
Source	Rating
AllMusic	3/5 stars

Alex Henderson of AllMusic described Tearing Down the Walls as both an "introspective singer/songwriter offering" and "intimate, often confessional pop/rock date". He added: "This album has a very reflective tone, and "personal" is definitely the watchword on "Someday," "Here It Goes Again," "The Walls," and other songs she wrote or co-wrote."

The professional body piercer Elayne Angel mentioned the track "All I Want" in an interview with Jodie Michalak. When asked for the song on her iPod right now and the one she kept replaying, Angel stated "It's a song called "All I Want" by E. G. Daily. It may be a little obscure, but I really like her music – and she's a really cool lady. If you're not familiar with her work, you should check it out!"

== Track listing ==
No.	Title	Writer(s)	Length
1.	"The Walls"	E. G. Daily; Jimmy King	4:06
2.	"Keep It Together"	Daily	3:52
3.	"Don't Even Care"	Diane Louie; Daily	4:05
4.	"White Train"	Daily; Jack Ponti; Vick Pepe	3:58
5.	"I Can't Wait"	Daily; Paul Reeves	3:44
6.	"Someday"	Daily	4:06
7.	"Pretty Baby"	Daily	4:36
8.	"Here It Goes Again"	Daily	3:49
9.	"All I Want"	Daily; John Shanks	4:10
10.	"Breath of Heaven"	Amy Grant; Christopher Eaton	4:05

2007 Digital reissue bonus tracks
No.	Title	Length
11.	"Home"	2:56
12.	"Earthlings"	4:35
13.	"Just for You"	2:12
14.	"Tryin'"	3:38

== Personnel ==
- E. G. Daily – vocals, lead guitar, piano, harmonica, producer (all tracks)
- Jeff Kluesner – rhythm guitar (all tracks except track 7)
- Randy Mitchell – rhythm guitar (track 7)
- Jeff McElroy – bass guitar (all tracks except track 7)
- Ralf Balzer – drums (all tracks except track 7)
- Nick Vincent – drums (track 7)
- Brad Gilderman, Harvey Mason Jr. – producer (all tracks except track 7)
- Bernie Larsen – producer (track 7)
