= Summer School (1987 film) =

1987 film by Carl Reiner

- Theatrical release poster
- Directed by: Carl Reiner
- Screenplay by: Jeff Franklin
- Story by: Jeff Franklin; Stuart Birnbaum; David Dashev
- Produced by: George Shapiro; Howard West
- Starring: Mark Harmon; Kirstie Alley
- Cinematography: David M. Walsh
- Edited by: Bud Molin
- Music by: Danny Elfman
- Production company: Paramount Pictures
- Distributed by: Paramount Pictures
- Release date: July 22, 1987
- Running time: 98 minutes
- Country: United States
- Language: English
- Box office: $35.7 million (US)

Summer School is a 1987 American comedy film directed by Carl Reiner and starring Mark Harmon as a high school gym teacher who is forced to teach a remedial English class during the summer. The film co-stars Kirstie Alley and Courtney Thorne-Smith. Paramount Pictures distributed it, and George Shapiro and Howard West produced it. Danny Elfman composed the original score.

== Plot ==
At a L.A. area beach-city high school, on the last day of school before summer vacation, physical education teacher Freddy Shoop is preparing to vacation in Hawaii with his girlfriend, Kim. Vice principal Phil Gills hands out paper slips informing several underachievers that they must attend summer school for remedial English. Among the students are easily distracted Pam House; "nocturnal" Larry Kazamias, a male stripper; football jock Kevin Winchester; pregnant Rhonda Altobello; geeky Alan Eakian; dyslexic Denise Green; intimidating Jerome Watkins; and two horror film-obsessed underachievers, Dave Frazier and Francis Gremp, a.k.a. "Chainsaw".

The teacher scheduled to lead the class, Mr. Dearadorian, unexpectedly wins the lottery and immediately quits, so Gills seeks an emergency replacement among the teachers still on school grounds. Each manages to evade him, quickly figuring out what he wants them to do, until he finally corners Shoop and blackmails him into taking the job or losing tenure. Kim insists on going to Hawaii by herself despite Shoop's pleas for her to stay.

On his first day, Shoop meets Robin Bishop, who is teaching American History next door. He falls for her, but she is already dating Gills. His first day is a disaster. Most of the students slack off, and Jerome goes to the bathroom and does not return. A beautiful Italian transfer student, Anna-Maria, is transferred to the class to work on her English, much to the delight of Dave and Chainsaw. After some students inexplicably leave and the remaining ones attempt to leave class as well, Shoop admits he has no idea how to teach them. Instead of studying, he and the students spend their first few days having fun on field trips to a go-karting track, a theme park, a petting zoo, and the beach.

Gills finds out about the field trips and threatens to fire Shoop unless his students pass the end-of-term English basic skills exam. With Alan's suggestion, Shoop negotiates with each teen to grant them a favor if they study. The students agree, so he gives Denise driving lessons, accompanies Rhonda to Lamaze classes, gives Kevin football lessons, allows Dave and Chainsaw to throw a party at his house and gives them rides to school, gives Larry a bed in the classroom, lets Chainsaw arrange a screening of The Texas Chain Saw Massacre in class and allows Pam to move in with him. When Denise asks Alan to help her write a letter, he realizes she is dyslexic and shows Shoop. After Denise passes her driving test, Shoop tells her about the diagnosis and refers her to a specialist. Seeing that he is still floundering as a teacher, Robin tells Shoop to make learning fun. He begins to grow closer to the kids, and they respond by studying.

Shoop is arrested, covering for Dave and Chainsaw after they are found in possession of alcohol. He desperately calls Robin, and she and Gills bail him out of jail. Gills then inadvertently exposes his true self to Robin when he reiterates his dislike of Shoop and his students, and she overhears, causing her to storm off. Larry loses his stripper job when he is found out by his aunt and his mother, who go to the club where he works. Later in court, Robin pleads with the judge to be lenient, explaining that Shoop went to jail to protect his students. The judge agrees and drops all charges.

As test day approaches, Shoop tells the students they need to take a practice test and step up their studying. The students instead make more demands, so he throws an English book against the chalkboard, lists his sacrifices, and quits his job in anger. His students start feeling guilty and scare off Shoop's dull replacement with a scene reminiscent of "The Texas Chain Saw Massacre." They find Shoop moping on the beach while eating ice cream, ask him to return, and he accepts.

Shoop and his students then begin preparing for the test in earnest, and even Jerome, who had "gone to the bathroom" weeks before, returns. The exam goes smoothly, except that Rhonda goes into labor during the test; she gives birth and gives the baby up for adoption. Afterward, Gills tells Shoop that the average grade was below passing, indicating failure, so he is ready to fire him. However, the students' parents come to defend him. Due to each of the students' marked improvement, Principal Kelban grants Shoop tenure for his positive efforts despite Gills' objections.

Shoop returns to the beach with his dog and Robin. He asks her to dinner for the last time, and she finally accepts, kissing him at sunset.

== Cast ==
- Mark Harmon as Freddy Shoop
- Kirstie Alley as Robin Bishop
- Robin Thomas as Vice Principal Phil Gills
- Courtney Thorne-Smith as Pam House
- Dean Cameron as Francis "Chainsaw" Gremp
- Gary Riley as Dave Frazier
- Patrick Labyorteaux as Kevin Winchester
- Kelly Jo Minter as Denise Green
- Shawnee Smith as Rhonda Altobello
- Richard Horvitz as Alan Eakian
- Ken Olandt as Larry Kazamias
- Fabiana Udenio as Anna-Maria Mazarelli
- Duane Davis as Jerome Watkins / bathroom guy
- Tom Troupe as Judge Stuart R. Dryer
- Francis X. McCarthy as Principal Kelban (credited as Frank McCarthy)
- Carl Reiner as Mr. Dearadorian
- Andrea Howard as a woman at Strip Joint
- Amy Stock-Poynter as Kim

== Soundtrack ==
The Summer School soundtrack, on Chrysalis, consists of 1980s rock and dance songs with performers including Paul Engemann, Blondie, E. G. Daily, The Fabulous Thunderbirds, Vinnie Vincent, Billy Burnette, and Elisa Fiorillo.

Some songs that appear in the film, including James Brown's, "Papa's Got a Brand New Bag", Blondie's "Rapture" and Eddie Murphy's "Party All the Time", do not appear on the soundtrack. The movie is also notable for containing the only completely unreleased Danny Elfman film score to date.

Daily's "Mind Over Matter" was released as a single off the soundtrack. It became a top 10 dance hit in the US and hit #96 in the UK in 1988. The song was originally recorded by Debbie Harry, but label disputes caused her recording to go unreleased and Daily was chosen to sing it instead. The song was produced at PWL by Mike Stock, Matt Aitken and Pete Waterman.

=== Track listing ===
No.	Title	Artist(s)	Length
1.	"Happy (Note: Not to be confused with Elfman's 2020 song by the same name.)"	Danny Elfman (Note: Actually performed by Elfman's band Oingo Boingo, but credit changed for contractual reasons)	3:57
2.	"Mind Over Matter"	E. G. Daily	4:21
3.	"Jackie"	Elisa Fiorillo	3:41
4.	"I'm Supposed to Have Sex with You"	Tonio K	5:00
5.	"Seduction"	E.G. Daily	3:41
6.	"Brain Power"	Paul Engemann	4:09
7.	"All I Want from You"	TAMI Show	5:09
8.	"Second Language"	Tone Norum	3:40
9.	"My Babe"	The Fabulous Thunderbirds	2:36
10.	"Get an Education"	Billy Burnette	3:45
Total length:			39:59

== Reception ==
=== Critical response ===
On the review aggregator website Rotten Tomatoes, 57% of 35 critics' reviews are positive, with an average rating of 5.4/10. Metacritic, which uses a weighted average, assigned the film a score of 27 out of 100 based on 9 critics, indicating "generally unfavorable reviews".

Roger Ebert gave the film ½ out of four stars, calling it "listless, leisurely and unspirited".

=== Box office ===
The film grossed $35.7 million in the United States, becoming the 32nd highest-grossing film of 1987.

== Home media ==
Paramount Home Entertainment released a bare-bones DVD edition of Summer School in 2004. This was followed by a special edition DVD, known as the "Life's a Beach Edition", which was released on May 22, 2007.

Shout Factory released a Blu-ray edition, including the 2007 bonus features and a discussion with Richard Steven Horvitz, on Feb 8, 2022.

== Remake ==
Along with the special edition DVD release commemorating the 20th anniversary of Summer School, many of the original cast attended a reunion party. During an audience Q&A, Dean Cameron suggested that he would be open to a sequel or possibly even a remake of the original. When asked who he would cast as Chainsaw, he suggested Shia LaBeouf or Zach Braff.

In early 2012, Adam Sandler's production company Happy Madison Productions signed on for a remake.
