= Land of Hunger =

"Land of Hunger" is a 1984 single by Earons. The single was the group's only hit on the dance chart, where it went to number one for one week, in late spring 1984. "Land of Hunger" did not chart on the Hot 100, however, the reggae flavored single peaked at number thirty-six on the soul singles chart.

== See also ==
- List of number-one dance singles of 1984 (U.S.)
