= Lace Around the Wound =

Studio album by E. G. Daily
- Released: May 25, 1989
- Genre: Pop; rock
- Length: 50:02
- Label: A&M
- Producer: Lotti Golden; Tommy Faragher; John Van Tongeren; E. G. Daily; Glenn Skinner; Pete Glenister

E. G. Daily chronology
Wild Child (1985)	Lace Around the Wound (1989)	Tearing Down the Walls (1999)

Singles from Lace Around the Wound
- 1. "Some People" Released: 1989; 2. "Heart Don't Lie" Released: 1989

Lace Around the Wound is the second studio album by the American singer, actress and musician E. G. Daily, released by A&M in 1989.

== Background ==
The album signaled a change in direction for Daily from synthpop to pop-rock, Daily's sophomore offering was singled out as "worthy of praise" in Cashbox for its for its well-written songs and subject matter, artfully delivered by Daily. The album's lead single, "Some People," written and produced by Lotti Golden and Tommy Faragher peaked at No. 33 on the US Billboard Dance Music/Club Play Singles Chart. "Heart Don't Lie" was issued as a promotional-only release, in lieu of second single. After A&M failed to sufficiently promote the album, Daily parted ways with the label. She wouldn't release another album until 1999 Tearing Down the Walls.

The second cut on the LP, produced by Lotti Golden and Tommy Faragher, Cry Just a Little, was later covered by Celine Dion, produced by Ric Wake for her 1992 eponymous album, but the song was not added to the final track list. Instead, it was used as a B-side on certain editions on the "Love Can Move Mountains" single. Two other Golden/Faragher songs on the album, "This Time" and "Heart Don't Lie,"(co-written with Daily) appeared in the American NBC hit television series California Dreams, and were covered by the cast of the TV show on their California Dreams (Soundtrack) CD by MCA Records (1992).

== Critical reception ==
Professional ratings
Review scores
Source	Rating
AllMusic	2.5/5 stars

Cash Box published two reviews of the album during 1989. The first commented: "We weren't prepared for the smokey sensuality of her blues-dance-pop-jazz song stylings. Who are we to say that she's not better than Madonna? With her alternating twang, bop and dance floor inflections, she's certainly more diverse. And her more-than-just-kittenish personality comes through loud and clear." The songs written and produced by Lotti Golden and Tommy Faragher (responsible for producing half the LP), do justice to Daily's soulful, raspy sound, by returning the artist to a roots rock, country feel, peppered with an R&B edge, as described in the second Cash Box review: "E.G. Daily offers us soulful, bluesy rock, with a little country twang to make things interesting. This is not your average, radio-ready, girl-pop. It's a little deeper than that. Daily touches on many subjects, and comes off with an album that is certainly well written and worthy of praise." Ivan Brunet of the Nanaimo Daily News wrote: "On this new offering Daily's opted for a mainstream pop sound. The young lady has reached a level of artistry where labels no longer apply." The production team of Golden & Faragher provide Daily with material designed to showcase her emotional and technical vocal prowess. A compliment to the roots oriented tracks, "Heart Don't Lie" and "This Time," evoke shades of Cyndi Lauper but are uniquely her own.

== Track listing ==
No.	Title	Writer(s)	Length
1.	"Some People"	Lotti Golden; Tommy Faragher	5:03
2.	"Cry Just a Little"	Golden; Faragher	4:41
3.	"Bad Water"	E. G. Daily; Golden; Faragher	4:44
4.	"Just Can't Say Goodbye"	Daily; Golden; Faragher	2:47
5.	"Heart Don't Lie"	Daily; Golden; Faragher	4:31
6.	"Lace Around the Wound"	Daily	4:02
7.	"This Time"	Golden; Faragher	4:26
8.	"Reach Out"	Daily; John Van Tongeren	3:46
9.	"Are You There"	Daily; Marshall Rohner	3:44
10.	"Little Trooper"	Daily; Pete Glenister	3:58
11.	"What Do I Gotta Do"	Mike Gaffey; Glenister	4:16
12.	"Please Send Me Someone to Love"	Percy Mayfield	3:53

== Singles ==
The single "Some People" peaked at number 33 on the specialized U.S. Billboard Dance/Club Play Songs Chart.

== Personnel ==
- E. G. Daily – lead vocals, backing vocals (tracks 4–12), keyboards (track 6)
- Michael Reid – guitar (track 1)
- Keith Mack – guitar (tracks 2–7)
- Ira Siegel – guitar (track 5), acoustic guitar (track 7)
- Cristian Amigo – guitar (track 8)
- Marshall Rohner – guitar (tracks 9, 12)
- Michael Landau – guitar (tracks 9, 12)
- Pete Glenister – guitar (tracks 10–11)
- Tommy Faragher – keyboards (tracks 1–7), bass (track 4), cymbal (tracks 1–7), whistle (track 4), backing vocals (tracks 1–5, 7)
- John Van Tongeren – keyboards (tracks 8–9, 12), backing vocals (track 8)
- Mike Timothy – keyboards (track 10)
- Bob Andrews – organ, piano (track 11)
- Diane Lewie – piano (track 12)
- Danny Faragher – harmonica (track 1)
- Davey Faragher – trombone (tracks 1–2), trumpet (tracks 1–2), bass (tracks 1–3, 5–7)
- Chris Eminizer – saxophone (tracks 1–2, 5), harmonica (track 3), harp (track 3)
- Neil Sidwell – trombone (track 10)
- Simon Clarke, Tim Sanders – saxophone (tracks 10–11)
- Roddy Lorimer – trumpet (tracks 10–11)
- Steve Sidwell – trumpet (track 11)
- Phil Overhead – tambourine (track 11)
- Lon Price – saxophone (track 12)
- Tim Landers – bass (track 9)
- Pino Palladino – bass (track 11)
- Denny Fonghiezer – drums (track 9)
- Mike Gaffey – drums (tracks 10–11)
- Bashiri Johnson – percussion (tracks 1–3, 5–7)
- Lenny Castro – percussion (track 9)
- Lotti Golden – backing vocals (tracks 1–5, 7)
- Cindy Mizelle – backing vocals (track 2)
- Helen Terry – backing vocals (tracks 10–11)
- Ruby Turner – backing vocals (tracks 10–11)
- Billy Vera – backing vocals (track 12)

Production

- E. G. Daily – producer (tracks 9, 12)
- Lotti Golden – producer (tracks 1–7), mixing (tracks 1–7)
- Tommy Faragher – producer (tracks 1–7), mixing (tracks 1–7), engineer (tracks 1–7), drum programming (tracks 1–7)
- John Van Tongeren – producer (track 8), programmer (track 8)
- Pete Glenister – producer (tracks 10–11), mixing (tracks 10–11), arrangement (tracks 10–11), programmer (tracks 10–11)
- Glenn Skinner – producer (tracks 10–11), mixing (tracks 10–11), arrangement (tracks 10–11), engineer (tracks 10–11), programmer (tracks 10–11)
- Jay Rifkin – mixing (track 8), engineer (track 8)
- Michael Hutchinson – mixing (track 9)
- Steve Churchard – mixing (track 12)
- Barry Rudolph – engineer (track 1)
- Lance McVickar – engineer (tracks 1–2, 5–7)
- Louis Scalise – engineer (tracks 1–7)
- Dennis Wall – engineer (track 2)
- Csaba Petocz – engineer (tracks 9, 12)
- Joe Borja – engineer (track 9)
- Victor Simonelli – editor (tracks 2, 5, 7)
- George Marino – mastering

Other

- Mary Maurer – design
- Chuck Beeson – art direction
- Richard Frankel – art direction
- Michael Brent – artwork
- Victoria Pearson – photography
- Genevieve Schorr – stylist
