= Feel the Fire (Claudja Barry album) =

Studio album by Claudja Barry
- Released: Nov. 1979 (Europe), Jan. 1980 (US)
- Recorded: 1979
- Studio: Musicland Studios & Union Studios, Munich, Rusk Sound Studios, Hollywood
- Genre: Dance
- Length: 38:01
- Label: Lollipop Records
- Producer: Jurgen S. Korduletsch

Claudja Barry chronology
I Wanna Be Loved By You (1978)	Feel the Fire (1979)	Made in Hong Kong (1981)

Professional ratings
Review scores
Source	Rating
AllMusic	3/5 stars

Feel the Fire is Claudja Barry's fourth studio album, released late 1979 on Lollipop Records in Europe. It was the second and final album of her American album deal with Chrysalis Records. It spawned a minor hit single with the title track "You Make Me Feel the Fire" which peaked at No. 55 on Billboard's Disco Chart. "Stop He's a Lover" was the second single in February 1980, following Barry's performance on Tokyo Music Festival where she won silver, but the single failed to chart. Italy chose a release of "Get Your Mind Made Up" for their second single.

The album was the first of her LP's to be released with the same track-list worldwide. It also marked the first time Barry had a hand in the songwriting of all songs but one, a cover of Ian Dury's "Wake Up and Make Love with Me". The album made a brief appearance on the Canadian chart, peaking at No. 95 in January 1980.

== Track list ==
No.	Title	Writer(s)	Length
1.	"You Make Me Feel the Fire"	Jürgen S. Korduletsch; Jörg Evers; Claudja Barry	5:44
2.	"Get Your Mind Made Up"	Korduletsch; Evers; Barry	3:16
3.	"One Night Queen"	Korduletsch; Evers; Barry	3:16
4.	"It's So Nice"	Korduletsch; Evers; Barry	3:41
5.	"Everybody Needs Love"	Korduletsch; Evers; Barry	3:28
6.	"Wake Up And Make Love With Me"	Chas Jankel, Ian Dury	5:46
7.	"Stop He's A Lover"	Korduletsch; Michael Hofmann; Barry	6:14
8.	"Love Seemed so Easy Without You"	Korduletsch; Evers; Barry	6:05

Trk. 2-4 is a non-stop medley (10:12)

== Outtakes ==
- "You Make Me Feel the Fire" (Canadian 12" Version) - 8:43
- "Sweet Sensation" (Leslie Kong) - B-side of "Stop He's a Lover" (Feb. '80)
- "Gimme Some Lovin' - a cover of Spencer Davis Group's hit (written by Steve Winwood) was included on Disco Circus' "Plastic Paradise" album (Feb. '80)

== Personnel ==
- Jerry Rix, Julia Waters, Maxine Waters, Stephanie Spruill - backing vocals
- Les Hurdle - bass
- Graham Jarvis - drums
- Jörg Evers - guitar, backing vocals
- Kristian Schultze, Lance Dixon, Patrick Gammon - keyboards
- Bob Conti - percussion
- Gary Herbig - saxophone
