= Sweet Dynamite =

Studio album by Claudja Barry
- Released: November 1976 (Europe); May 1977 (US)
- Recorded: 1976
- Genre: Disco, funk
- Length: 43:05
- Label: Philips/Lollipop
- Producer: Jürgen S. Korduletsch

Claudja Barry chronology
Sweet Dynamite (1976)	The Girl Most Likely (1977)

Professional ratings
Review scores
Source	Rating
Allmusic	4.5/5 stars

Sweet Dynamite is the debut album by Canadian singer Claudja Barry. Barry had briefly been a member of an early line-up of Boney M. but left January 1976 and was replaced by Liz Mitchell. Shortly after, she released her first single on the Lollipop-label, produced by her husband-to-be Jürgen S. Korduletsch, a cover of Jeanne Burton's "Nobody Loves Me Like You Do", backed with the track "Disco Love" (a track similar to Penny MacLean's contemporary hit "Lady Bump"). Later in the year the single "Why Must a Girl Like Me" was released, leading up to the release of the LP entitled "Sweet Dynamite" in November. While most of the material was original compositions by Korduletsch and his partner Jörg Evers, it included a medley of two songs, both entitled "Do It Again", one by George Gershwin and one by Steely Dan.

Although the album and its singles went fairly unnoticed in Germany, import copies garnered interest in the US where Salsoul Records picked up the album for a release in May 1977 in a drastically altered version. Tom Moulton had kept only 5 of the original tracks, remixing and extending them and, in the case of "Live a Little Bit", removing Barry's vocals completely. "Sweet Dynamite" became a Top 10 hit on Billboard's Disco Charts.

== "Love for the Sake of Love" ==
Barry's mid-tempo album track "Love for the Sake of Love" garnered recognition 23 years after its release when it was sampled in 1999 on Montell Jordan's "Get It On Tonite" which went No. 1 on Hot R&B/Hip-Hop Songs, selling 800,000 copies in the US alone. It was also a Top 20-hit in several European countries. The track has been sampled by other artists, incl. the late rapper Prodigy and Mobb Deep.

== Track listing ==
1976 European Version

No.	Title	Writer(s)	Length
1.	"Sweet Dynamite"	Jürgen S. Korduletsch; Jörg Evers	4:06
2.	"Why Must a Girl Like Me"	Korduletsch; Evers	4:07
3.	"Dance, Dance, Dance"	Korduletsch; Evers	5:34
4.	"Live a Little Bit"	Korduletsch; Evers	3:51
5.	"This Taste of Love"	Korduletsch; Evers	4:21
6.	"Love for the Sake of Love"	Korduletsch; Evers	5:16
7.	"Ride on My Fire"	Korduletsch; Evers	4:07
8.	"Do It Again (Part I & II)"	George Gershwin; Buddy DeSylva; Walter Becker; Donald Fagen; Korduletsch	8:28
9.	"Nobody Loves Me Like You Do Do"	Sonny Casella	2:56

1977 US Version

No.	Title	Writer(s)	Length
1.	"Love for the Sake of Love"	Korduletsch; Evers	7:53
2.	"Sweet Dynamite"	Korduletsch; Evers	7:22
3.	"Dance, Dance, Dance"	Korduletsch; Evers	6:43
4.	"Live a Little Bit"	Korduletsch; Evers	3:28
5.	"Why Must a Girl Like Me"	Korduletsch; Evers	7:21

Remix: Tom Moulton

== Musicians ==
Drums: Keith Forsey
Bass: Gary Unwin, Dave King
Keyboards: Thor Baldursson
Guitar: Jörg Evers
Percussion: Jürgen S. Korduletsch, Jörg Evers
Backing Vocals: Roberta Kelly, Claudia Schwartz & Stefan Zauner

== Charts ==
=== Singles ===
Year	Single	Chart positions
Year	Single	Hot Dance/Disco
1977	"Sweet Dynamite"	6
