= Mind Over Matter (E. G. Daily song) =

Single by E. G. Daily

from the album Summer School
- B-side: "Mind Over Matter (Instrumental)"
- Released: 1987
- Genre: Pop
- Length: 4:21
- Label: Chrysalis; A&M
- Songwriters: Michael Jay; Rick Palombi
- Producer: Stock Aitken Waterman

E. G. Daily singles chronology
"Love in the Shadows" (1986)	"Mind Over Matter" (1987)	"Some People" (1989)

"Mind Over Matter" is a song by the American singer E. G. Daily, which was released in 1987 as a single from the soundtrack album of the American comedy film Summer School. The song was written by Michael Jay and Rick Palombi, and produced by Stock Aitken Waterman. It reached number 7 on the US Billboard Hot Dance Club Songs Chart, and number 22 on the Cash Box Top 12" Dance Singles Chart.

== Background ==
Jay and Palombi wrote "Mind Over Matter" in 1985. It was originally recorded by Nikki Leeger and released in 1986 as a UK-only single by RCA. The following year saw Debbie Harry record the song, which was slated for release as a single from the soundtrack of the upcoming film Summer School. However, label disputes caused her version to go unreleased. Although they were willing to allow the song to be included on the film's soundtrack, Chrysalis refused to allow Harry's version to be released as a single. The label decided to have the song re-recorded and came to an agreement with A&M Records over the hiring of Daily, who flew to London to provide vocals on the track.

== Music video ==
A music video was filmed to promote the single, which was directed by Maurice Phillips and produced by Nicholas Myers for AWGO. It featured many cast members of Summer School and achieved breakout rotation on MTV.

== Formats ==
7" single

1. "Mind Over Matter" - 4:21
2. "Mind Over Matter (Instrumental)" - 4:21

7" single (1988 UK, Australia and New Zealand release)

1. "Mind Over Matter" - 4:21
2. "Love in the Shadows" - 3:54

12" single

1. "Mind Over Matter (Remix)" - 7:06
2. "Mind Over Matter (Edit)" - 6:19

12" single (US promo)

1. "Mind Over Matter (Remix)" - 7:06
2. "Mind Over Matter (Edit)" - 6:19

== Chart performance ==
Chart (1987–88)	Peak position
New Zealand Singles Chart	37
UK Singles Chart	96
US Billboard Hot Dance Club Play	7
US Billboard Hot Dance Single Sales	17

== Personnel ==
- E. G. Daily - lead vocals
- Stock Aitken Waterman - producers
