= Cry Just a Little (E. G. Daily song) =

Song by American singer E. G. Daily

Song by E. G. Daily

from the album Lace Around the Wound
- Released: 1989
- Studio: Mad Fly (New York City)
- Length: 4:41
- Label: A&M
- Songwriters: Lotti Golden; Tommy Faragher
- Producers: Lotti Golden; Tommy Faragher

"Cry Just a Little" is a song recorded by American singer E. G. Daily for her second studio album Lace Around the Wound, released on A&M records in 1989. Written and produced by Lotti Golden and Tommy Faragher, the song takes Daily in a roots rock/country direction, showcasing her soulful, raspy vocal stylings with an R&B edge." "This is not your average, radio-ready, girl-pop."

"Cry Just a Little" was covered by Celine Dion and produced by Rick Wake for her 1992 eponymous album. The song was not added to the final track listing, but appeared on the B-side of Dion's 1992 single, "Love Can Move Mountains".
