= Claudja Barry =

Canadian singer

- Born: 1952 (age 73–74); Jamaica
- Genres: Disco, hi-NRG, pop, house
- Occupations: Singer, songwriter, actress
- Years active: 1975–present
- Labels: Lollipop, Epic
- Website: claudjabarry.com

Claudja Barry (born in 1952) is a Jamaican-born Canadian singer. Her successful songs were "Down and Counting", "Boogie Woogie Dancin' Shoes" (which peaked at No. 56 on the Billboard Hot 100 on 9 June 1979), "Dancing Fever", and others. As an actress, she is known for appearing in the European versions of stage musicals AC/DC and Catch My Soul.

== Career ==
=== Early career ===
At the age of six, Barry and her family emigrated from Jamaica to Scarborough, Ontario, Canada. After graduation from high school, Barry left for London where she eventually landed a role in the musical AC/DC by Heathcote Williams and after that in a German production of Catch My Soul. The play toured Europe where she eventually wound up in West Germany in the spring of 1975. That same year she signed with Hot Foot label and released a single called "Reggae Bump". While not a commercial success, it got Barry noticed by German producer Frank Farian who was casting members for his new project Boney M. Barry starred alongside Maizie Williams, Sheyla Bonnick and another named Mike, the latter two eventually being replaced by Marcia Barrett and Bobby Farrell. Seeing no future lip-sync'ing for the group, Barry left Boney M. early 1976 and was replaced by Liz Mitchell. Teaming up with her husband-to-be Jürgen Korduletsch, Barry released her first single on the Lollipop label, "Nobody Loves Me Like You Do" in the spring. She was offered to join Silver Convention, taking Linda G. Thompson's place, but declined.

With her first album, Sweet Dynamite released in November 1976, she enjoyed her first Billboard Disco Top 10-hit of a total of six with the title track, followed by "Dancin' Fever" the following year. Her biggest hit came early 1979 with "Boogie Woogie Dancin' Shoes" which hit No. 7 in Canada and Billboard's Disco Chart and also went Top 20 in Sweden and Belgium. Also in 1979, she won a Juno Award for being the Most Promising Female Vocalist of the Year. She did not achieve any chart hits in Germany where she recorded her albums.

=== The 1980s ===
Barry entered the 1980s with the album Feel the Fire which did not yield a significant hit-single for her. In 1981, she made a foray into new wave/Hi-NRG music with the album Made in Hong Kong. It featured the lead single "Radio Action", which became a moderate club hit peaking at No. 57. A follow-up album If I Do It to You was due for a release on Atlantic Records sublabel, Mirage, but remains unreleased.

Relocating to New York, she enjoyed another Top 20 Dance Hit with a Hi-NRG cover version of Little Peggy March's "I Will Follow Him", followed by an equally successful cover of The Yardbirds's "For Your Love".

In 1985, she appeared in the movie, Rappin', starring Mario Van Peebles. The year 1985 also saw the release of the single, "Born to Love". This single was produced by Jürgen Korduletsch with New York City based Hi-NRG producer, singer, and songwriter, Bobby Orlando. "Born to Love" peaked at No. 14 on Hot Dance Music/Club Play chart.

Signing to Epic Records in 1986, she enjoyed another big dance hit with "Down and Counting", which spent a week at No. 1 in 1986. Barry had further successes on that chart with the singles "Can't You Feel My Heartbeat" (No. 33 R&B) and "Secret Affair" (No. 60 R&B), taken from her 6th studio album, released 1987, I, Claudja, her only full-length record for Epic.

=== The 1990s ===
After her run at Epic did not result in another album, she mainly released techno/Eurodance singles, including the singles "Love Is An Island" (1991) and "Summer of Love" (1992). She covered a Prince song called "When 2 R in Love" in 1992 for Korduletsch's Radikal Records. In late 1993, the German Eurodance project General Base featured Barry as lead singer for their single "Poison", peaking at No'3 in Israel and No'41 in Germany. Miami-based Hot Productions released her 5 Lollipop albums on CD in 1993/94, including the 1980 compilation Disco Mixes featuring the extended versions. A Christmas/Holiday Dance album titled, Disco 'round The Christmas Tree was released on Radikal Records in 1995. Before the decade ended, she recorded another song called, "Reach Out For Me" on Tony Green Organization Records in 1997. She divorced Korduletsch in 1998 but still had him produce the album Love Him Forever that received a limited release in 1999.

=== 1999 to present ===
In 1999, R&B artist Montell Jordan sampled the rhythm track from Barry's single "Love For the Sake of Love," for the hit titled, "Get It On Tonite" (No. 4 on the Billboard Hot 100). In the year 2000, Da Brat also released a song with the same sample featuring Tyrese called "What'chu like" which reached number 26 on the Billboard Hot 100.

In May 2006, Barry returned to the Billboard chart with "I Will Stand" released on Donna Jean Records. By July the song had reached the Top 10 of the Hot Dance Music/Club Play chart, peaking at No. 4 before the end of the summer. It received moderate dance radio format airplay. In 2015, Barry's eighth album titled Come On Standup was released as a digital download only album release through CDBaby.

== Discography ==
=== Albums ===
- Sweet Dynamite (Lollipop, 1976)
- The Girl Most Likely a.k.a. Claudja (Lollipop, 1978)
- I Wanna Be Loved by You (Lollipop, 1978)
- Feel the Fire (Lollipop, 1979)
- Made in Hong Kong (Lollipop, 1981)
- I, Claudja (Epic, 1987)
- Come On Standup (CD Baby / Paradax Records, 2015) – digital download only

=== Compilation albums ===
- The Best of Claudja Barry (Hot Productions, 1991)

=== Singles ===
List of singles, with selected peak chart positions
Title	Year	Peak chart positions							Album
Title	Year	US Dance	US Pop	US R&B	AUS	BEL (WA)	CAN	SWE	Album
"Sweet Dynamite"	1977	6	—	—	—	—	—	—	Sweet Dynamite
"Dancing Fever"	1978	6	72	—	—	—	—	—	The Girl Most Likely
"Down by the Water" (Germany and Austria-only release)	1978	—	—	—	—	—	—	—	I Wanna Be Loved by You
"(Boogie Woogie) Dancin' Shoes"	1979	7	56	37	32	15	7	14	I Wanna Be Loved by You
"You Make Me Feel the Fire"	1979	55	—	—	—	—	70	—	Feel the Fire
"Radio Action"	1981	57	—	—	—	—	—	—	Made in Hong Kong
"I Will Follow Him" / "Work Me Over"	1982	5	—	—	—	—	—	—	Non-album single
"For Your Love" / "Beat My Drum"	1983	15	—	—	—	—	—	—	No La De Da, Part 2 (EP)
"Tripping on the Moon"	1984	24	—	—	—	—	—	—	Non-album singles
"Born to Love" / "Your Sweet Touch"	1985	14	—	—	—	—	—	—	Non-album singles
"Down and Counting"	1986	1	—	98	—	—	—	—	I, Claudja
"Can't You Feel My Heart Beat"	1987	27	—	33	—	—	—	—	I, Claudja
"Secret Affair"	1987	30	—	60	—	—	—	—	I, Claudja
"Hot to the Touch"	1988	25	—	—	—	—	—	—	I, Claudja
"Good Time" (S.I.N. featuring Claudja Barry)	1990	10	—	—	—	—	—	—	Non-album singles
"I Will Stand"	2006	4	—	—	—	—	—	—	Non-album singles

== See also ==
- List of number-one dance singles of 1986 (U.S.)
- List of artists who reached number one on the US Dance chart
- Bobby Orlando
