= I Wanna Be Loved by You (album) =

Studio album by Claudja Barry
- Released: November 1978
- Recorded: 1978
- Studios: Arco (Munich); Musicland (Munich)
- Genres: Disco, dance
- Length: 40:14
- Label: Lollipop Records
- Producer: Jürgen S. Korduletsch

Claudja Barry chronology
The Girl Most Likely (1977)	I Wanna Be Loved by You (1978)	Feel the Fire (1979)

Professional ratings
Review scores
Source	Rating
AllMusic	4/5 stars

I Wanna Be Loved by You is Claudja Barry's third studio album, released in November 1978 by Lollipop Records.

== Release ==
The lead single was "Down by the Water", which landed the singer a Top 20 hit in Austria. It was also covered by French singer Joe Dassin as "La vie se chante, la vie se pleure", in German by Christina Harrison ("Ein leeres Zimmer"), and in Dutch by Frank & Mirella (Na regen komt zonneschijn). The second single, "(Boogie Woogie) Dancin' Shoes", became Barry's biggest commercial success in early 1979, peaking at No. 7 in her native Canada, Top 20 in Belgium & Sweden, and her third Top 10 hit on Billboard's Dance Club Songs chart.

The album received a belated release in the US in the summer of 1979, retitled Boogie Woogie Dancin' Shoes and featuring a different track listing to the European version, dropping "Down by the Water", "I Wanna Be Loved by You" and "Love of the Hurtin' Kind" (issued as the B-side of "Dancin' Shoes" instead) in favour of an extended "Dancin' Shoes" and the inclusion of "Forget About You". The album was the first of a two album deal for Chrysalis Records.

== Outtakes ==
Outtakes from the album include: "Sunshine Love" (Korduletsch, Evers, Keith Forsey), released as the B-side of the "Boogie Tonight" 12-inch single in Canada; "American Hearts" (Frank Musker, Dominic Bugatti), covered the following year by Billy Ocean; a cover of Umberto Tozzi's "Ti Amo"; and "Who Gave Me Love" (Korduletsch, Evers, Barry), all included on a German compilation album in 1980. The full-length version of the title track, a cover of Marilyn Monroe's signature tune, was featured on the B-side of the "Dancin' Shoes" 12-inch single.

== Track listing ==
=== 1978 European Version ===
Side one
No.	Title	Writer(s)	Length
1.	"(Boogie Woogie) Dancin' Shoes"	Jürgen S. Korduletsch; Jörg Evers; Keith Forsey; Mats Björklund; Claudja Barry	5:05
2.	"Cold Fire"	Korduletsch; Evers; Barry	4:25
3.	"Give It Up"	Korduletsch; Evers; Barry; Björklund	5:35
4.	"Down by the Water"	Korduletsch; Evers; Forsey; Björklund	4:55

Side two
No.	Title	Writer(s)	Length
1.	"I Wanna Be Loved by You"	Herbert Stothart, Harry Ruby, Bert Kalmar	1:30
2.	"Heavy Makes You Happy"	Jeff Barry; Bobby Bloom	3:25
3.	"Nobody But You"	Korduletsch; Evers; Barry	3:30
4.	"The Way You Are Dancing"	Korduletsch; Evers; Barry	3:25
5.	"Boogie Tonight"	Korduletsch; Evers; Barry	3:55
6.	"Love of the Hurtin' Kind"	Korduletsch; Evers; Barry; Forsey; Björklund	4:30

- The Canadian & Israeli LP's replaced "Down by the Water" with "Love of the Hurtin' Kind" as track 4 and included "Forget About You" as track 10.

=== 1979 US & Japan Version: Boogie Woogie Dancin' Shoes ===
Side one
No.	Title	Writer(s)	Length
1.	"Boogie Woogie Dancin' Shoes"	Korduletsch; Evers; Barry; Forsey; Björklund	7:52
2.	"Cold Fire"	Korduletsch; Evers	4:25
3.	"Give It Up"	Korduletsch; Evers; Barry; Björklund	5:35

Side two
No.	Title	Writer(s)	Length
1.	"Heavy Makes You Happy"	Barry; Bloom	3:25
2.	"Nobody But You"	Korduletsch; Evers; Barry	3:30
3.	"The Way You Are Dancing"	Korduletsch; Evers; Barry	3:25
4.	"Boogie Tonight"	Korduletsch; Evers; Barry	3:55
5.	"Forget About You"	Andy MacMaster	2:55

== Personnel ==
- Claudja Barry – vocals

Additional musicians

- Keith Forsey – drums, Syndrums, percussion
- Les Hurdle – bass
- Mats Björklund – guitar
- Jörg Evers – guitar
- Kristian Schultze – keyboards, synthesizer
- Sigi Schwab – Spanish guitar ("Boogie Tonight")
- Jürgen S. Korduletsch – accordion ("Boogie Tonight")
- Etienne Cap – trumpets, trombones
- Georges Delagaye – trumpets, trombones
- Pepe Solera – saxes
- Fritz Sonnleitner – strings
- The Munich Strings – strings
- Claudia Schwarz – backing vocals
- Renate Maurer – backing vocals
- Maria Neuhaus – backing vocals
- Lucy Neale – backing vocals
- Gitta Walther – backing vocals
- Jerry Rix – backing vocals
- Timothy Touchton – backing vocals
- Victoria Miles – backing vocals
- Gammarock – backing vocals

Technical

- Mats Björklund – rhythm tracks arranger
- Jörg Evers – strings and horns arranger, rhythm tracks arranger
- Tom Savarese – disco consultant
- Jürgen S. Korduletsch – producer
- Falk-U Rogner – fotographs
- Eric Wuckel — artwork
- F.-Jürgen Rogner – lettering
- Dave Siddle – engineer
- Jürgen Koppers – engineer
- Tijen Tijoe – photograph (1979 version)
- Andy Engel – design (1979 version)
- Rod Dyer – design (1979 version)
- Chris Bellman – mastering (1979 version)

== Charts ==
=== Album ===
Year	Single	Chart positions
Year	Single	Canada
1978	"I Wanna Be Loved by You"	24

=== Singles ===
Year	Single	Peak chart positions						
Year	Single	US Pop	US R&B	US Disco	Canada	Sweden	Belgium	Austria
1978	"Down by the Water"	—	—	—	—	—	—	19
1978	"Boogie Woogie Dancin' Shoes"	56	37	7	7	14	15	—
1979	"Boogie Tonight"	—	—	—	—	—	—	—
