= Made in Hong Kong (album) =

Studio album by Claudja Barry
- Released: Feb. 1981
- Recorded: 1980
- Genre: Dance
- Length: 43:05
- Labels: Jupiter Records (Germany), Polydor
- Producer: Jurgen S. Korduletsch

Claudja Barry chronology
Feel the Fire (1980)	Made in Hong Kong (1981)	I, Claudja (1987)

Professional ratings
Review scores
Source	Rating
Allmusic	4.5/5 stars

Made in Hong Kong is Claudja Barry's fifth studio album, released in early 1981. The album marked a change in musical direction, moving away from her disco diva image, and embracing the synthesizer/new-wave-sound of the time. The lead single "Radio Action" was a gold-selling single in Canada and imported copies contributed to it becoming a minor dance hit on Billboard's Disco Charts, where it peaked at No. 57. According to Jürgen Korduletsch, Casablanca Records signed Barry for a US release of the album, but due to the label's collapse, PolyGram never followed through with the release.

== Track listing ==
No.	Title	Writer(s)	Length
1.	"Radio Action"	Jürgen S. Korduletsch; Claudja Barry; Günther Moll; Stefan Wissnet	6:47
2.	"Made In Hongkong"	Korduletsch; Moll; Wissnet	4:25
3.	"Don't Talk to the Wind"	Korduletsch; Wissnet; Michael Hofmann	4:30
4.	"Take Me to the River"	Al Green; Mabon Hodges	4:53
5.	"Take Me Back"	Korduletsch; Hofmann; Barry	4:05
6.	"Love Control"	Korduletsch; Brian Potter; John Lewis Parker	4:30
7.	"What'cha Doin' To Me"	Parker	4:10
8.	"Sweet Inspiration"	Korduletsch; Barry; Hofmann; Wissnet	3:39
9.	"Girl Crazy"	Korduletsch; Evers	3:55

== Outtakes ==
- A cover of Harry Belafonte's "Day-O (The Banana Boat Song)" was released as a single in August 1980 but only its B-side "Girl Crazy" was eventually included in the album.
- Barry recorded her second duet "The Two of Us" with label-mate Ronnie Jones which was released early 1981.
- "United We Stand" - duet with Ronnie Jones - B-side of "The Two of Us" single in some territories
- A cover of Split Enz' "I Got You" was the B-side of "Radio Action".

== Musicians ==
- Drums: Curt Cress, Todd Canedy
- Percussion: Curt Cress, Jürgen Korduletsch
- Bass: Günther Gebauer, Dave King
- Guitar: Mats Björklund, Jörg Evers
- Keyboards: Kristian Schultze
- Sitar: Al Gromer Khan
- Backing Vocals: Herbert Ihle, Wolfgang Emperhof, Jerry Rix

== If I Do It to You (Unreleased 1982 Album) ==
Claudja's 6th album had been intended for a 1982 release on Mirage Records (US) but remains unreleased. Only the lead single, "If I Do It to You" and its B-side "Up All Night", and a Canadian-only release of another Ronnie Jones duet "Don't Stop" were released. Songs recorded for the album included "Love Is Like a Small Town", "Heaven's in Your Eyes" (written by Bruce Sudano and originally recorded by Twiggy for her shelved 1979 album, produced by Donna Summer), and the synth-track "The More I See You".
