= Temper (band) =

- Genres: Dance-pop, boogie, electro
- Years active: 1984-1985
- Labels: MCA

Temper was a dance music group that was led by Anthony Malloy.

== Chart history ==
Their only chart entry was with the song "No Favors", which hit number one on the Billboard Hot Dance Music/Club Play chart in 1984. The song also peaked on the U.S. R&B chart at number 64.

Malloy also formed the group Anthony and the Camp.

== Band members ==
- Anthony Malloy
- Cleveland Wright III

== Discography ==
=== Singles ===
- 1984: "No Favors" (MCA-23506)
- 1985: "Fever" (MCA-23524)

== See also ==
- List of number-one dance hits (United States)
- List of artists who reached number one on the US Dance chart
