= The Girl Most Likely (Claudja Barry album) =

Studio album by Claudja Barry
- Released: Nov. 1977 (Europe), Feb. 1978 (US)
- Recorded: 1977
- Studio: Arco Studios, Munich, Germany; Sigma Sound, Philadelphia, Pennsylvania
- Genre: Dance; disco
- Length: 43:05
- Label: Philips/Lollipop
- Producer: Jürgen S. Korduletsch

Claudja Barry chronology
Sweet Dynamite (1976)	The Girl Most Likely (1977)	I Wanna Be Loved By You (1978)

Professional ratings
Review scores
Source	Rating
Allmusic	2.5/5 stars

The Girl Most Likely is Claudja Barry's second studio album, released November 1977. It was launched by the single "Take Me in Your Arms" (a cover of Motown-star Kim Weston's 1966 single) and was released just shortly after a duet between Barry and her label-mate Ronnie Jones, a cover of Marvin Gaye & Kim Weston's "It Takes Two". It was felt that the album was short of another hit single, and Korduletsch & Evers quickly produced "Johnny, Johnny, Please Come Home" which would be issued early 1978 as the second single. This would replace the track "I'll Be Dancin' No More" on later LP-pressings.

As with her debut album, "The Girl Most Likely" was remixed by Tom Moulton for its US release on Salsoul Records which came out in February 1978 under the title Claudja. The track "Long Lost Friend" was omitted in favour of an extended 7-minute version of "Johnny, Johnny". The single "Dancin' Fever" hit No. 6 on Billboard's Disco Charts and also gave Barry her first Pop hit on Billboard where it charted at No. 72. "Take It Easy" was the second single release in April.

== Outtakes ==
Outtakes from the album included the song "Wanna Win Your Love Back" (B-side of "Take Me in Your Arms"), a cover of "Summertime" (B-side of "Dancin' Fever" in Canada), and a cover of Badfinger's Without You which remained unreleased until 1980 when it was included on a German compilation album.

== Track listing ==
1977 European Version

No.	Title	Writer(s)	Length
1.	"Take Me in Your Arms"	Holland-Dozier-Holland	4:23
2.	"Take It Easy"	Keith Forsey; Mats Björklund	6:53
3.	"Love Machine"	Korduletsch; Evers	3:48
4.	"When Life Was Just a Game"	Michael Hoffmann; Claudja Barry	3:34
5.	"Every Beat of My Heart"	Johnny Otis	2:31
6.	"Open the Door"	Korduletsch; Evers; Forsey	3:33
7.	"I'll Be Dancin' No More *"	Korduletsch; Evers	2:59
8.	"Sexy Talkin' Lover"	Korduletsch; Evers; Barry	4:02
9.	"Dancin' Fever"	Korduletsch; Evers	6:04
10.	"Sexy Talkin' Lover"	Korduletsch; Evers	4:17

- Trk. 7 was replaced with "Johnny, Johnny, Please Come Home" 2:53 (Korduletsch, Evers) on the 1978 re-issue and 1993 CD edition. Japanese LP includes both tracks ("Johnny, Johnny" inserted as track B1).

1978 US Version

No.	Title	Writer(s)	Length
1.	"Open the Door"	Korduletsch; Evers; Forsey	5:48
2.	"Love Machine"	Korduletsch; Evers	4:50
3.	"When Life Was Just a Game"	Michael Hoffmann; Barry	3:53
4.	"Take It Easy"	Forsey; Björklund	6:53
5.	"Dancin' Fever"	Korduletsch; Evers; Barry	5:14
6.	"Johnny, Johnny Please Come Home"	Korduletsch; Evers	7:09
7.	"Take Me In Your Arms"	Holland-Dozier-Holland	4:20
8.	"Every Beat of My Heart"	Otis	2:31
9.	"Sexy Talkin' Lover"	Korduletsch; Evers	3:52

Remix: Tom Moulton (Except Trk. 7 Mixed by Korduletsch)

1978 UK Version

No.	Title	Writer(s)	Length
1.	"Open the Door"	Korduletsch; Evers; Forsey	3:33
2.	"Love Machine"	Korduletsch; Evers	3:48
3.	"Sweet Dynamite *"	Korduletsch; Evers	4:07
4.	"Dancin' Fever"	Korduletsch; Evers; Barry	6:04
5.	"Take It Easy"	Forsey; Björklund	6:53
6.	"Johnny, Johnny Please Come Home"	Korduletsch; Evers	2:53
7.	"Take Me In Your Arms"	Holland-Dozier-Holland	4:20
8.	"Why Must a Girl Like Me *"	Korduletsch; Evers	3:52
9.	"Every Beat of My Heart"	Otis	4:11

Trk. 3 and 8 Taken from Sweet Dynamite LP (1976)

== Personnel ==
- Drums & Percussion: Keith Forsey
- Bass: Gary Unwin
- Keyboards: Geoff Stradling
- Guitar: Mats Björklund
- Horns & Flutes: Pepe Solera, Etienne Cap
- Additional Percussion: Jürgen S. Korduletsch, Jörg Evers, Joe Spector
- Backing Vocals: Carla Benson, Evette Benton, Barbara Ingram, N. Henry Ingram
