= Wild Child (E. G. Daily album) =

Studio album by E. G. Daily
- Released: 1985
- Genre: Pop rock
- Length: 41:13
- Label: A&M
- Producer: E. G. Daily; Harold Faltermeyer; Rick Ramirez; Keith Forsey

E. G. Daily chronology
Wild Child (1985)	Lace Around the Wound (1989)

Singles from Wild Child
- 1. "Say It, Say It" Released: 1986; 2. "Love In the Shadows" Released: 1986

Wild Child is the debut studio album by American singer and actress E. G. Daily, released by A&M in 1985.

Although the album was not a commercial success, the lead single "Say It, Say It" reached No. 1 on the US Billboard Hot Dance Club Play chart and No. 70 on the Billboard Hot 100 in 1986. The second single, "Love in the Shadows", reached No. 6 on the Billboard Hot Dance Club Play Songs Chart.

Wild Child was recorded at Arco Studios in Munich, Oasis, Cherokee and Conway Recording Studios in Los Angeles, and Sigma Sound Studios in New York City. "Just for You" was dedicated to Jon-Erik Hexum, Daily's boyfriend of the time, an American model and actor who died in late 1984 as a result of a firearms accident on the set of the CBS television series Cover Up in which he played the male lead.

== Critical reception ==
Professional ratings
Review scores
Source	Rating
AllMusic	4/5 stars

Upon release, Cash Box listed the album as one of their feature picks in February 1986 and stated: "Valley Girls star E.G. Daily takes a stab at music with a respectable debut. An innocent vocal sound disarms the listener and reveals a powerhouse singer underneath". Billboard noted: "Her mix of raspy lower register and silky falsetto gives Daily an enticing pop/rock stamp on this debut."

Jane Greenstein of the Los Angeles Times wrote: "It's easy to become infatuated with this album. Daily's a sinewy, smoky vocalist who alternately shrieks and pouts as she tosses out some fine, beyond-Benatar, post-adolescent album rock. The overdone disco tunes remind you that all's not well, but the commercial fix this record supplies is good while it lasts." Jon Bream of the Star Tribune wrote: "Wild Child is a bit like Cyndi Lauper's debut album in that it lacks stylistic focus but a listener can sense the performer's winning quality. Daily's sultrier than Pat Benatar and more believable as a rocker than Sheena Easton. Wild Child sounds like the album that Stevie Nicks wanted to make or Tina Turner might make to follow Private Dancer. And it signals that Daily could become a serious contender."

Alex Henderson of AllMusic retrospectively selected the album as an AMG Album Pick, describing it as a "promising debut". He said: "When people think of Daily, they think of her 1986 single "Say It, Say It" – a very Madonna-ish R&B/pop gem. But anyone who heard Daily's debut album, Wild Child, learned that most of the songs are neither urban contemporary nor dance-pop; overall, Wild Child is a pop/rock album. The LP's most dance-oriented tracks are "Say It, Say It" and an inspired cover of Donna Summer's "Sunset People". But the rest of the tracks are straight-up pop/rock."

== Track listing ==
No.	Title	Writer(s)	Length
1.	"Is Anybody Home?"	E. G. Daily; Harold Faltermeyer; Rick Ramirez	4:20
2.	"Little Toy"	Daily; Ramirez	3:50
3.	"Love in the Shadows"	Daily; Faltermeyer	3:54
4.	"Just for You"	Daily; Ramirez	3:32
5.	"Hey There Rocky"	Daily; Ramirez	3:35
6.	"Say It, Say It"	Daily; Stephen Bray; Toni C.	4:34
7.	"Wild Child"	Daily; Faltermeyer	3:29
8.	"Don't Let Them Take the Child Away"	Daily; Ramirez	3:35
9.	"Waiting" (from The Breakfast Club)	Keith Forsey; Steve Schiff	4:37
10.	"Sunset People"	Faltermeyer; Forsey; Pete Bellotte	4:35

== Singles ==
Say It, Say It

Chart (1986)	Peak position
Canadian Singles Chart	46
Dutch Singles Chart	13
New Zealand Singles Chart	14
U.S. Billboard Hot 100	70
U.S. Billboard Dance/Club Play	1
U.S. Billboard Hot Dance Music/Maxi-Singles Sales	4
U.S. Billboard Hot Black Singles	71

Love in the Shadows

Chart (1986)	Peak position
Dutch Singles Chart	37
U.S. Billboard Dance/Club Play	6
U.S. Billboard Hot Dance Music/Maxi-Singles Sales	14

== Personnel ==
- E. G. Daily – lead vocals (tracks 1–10), backing vocals (tracks 2, 4–5, 8), keyboards (tracks 2, 4–5, 8)
- Bimi Obereit, Patricia Schokley, Victoria Miles – backing vocals (tracks 1, 3, 7, 10)
- Audrey Wheeler, Siedah Garrett – backing vocals (track 6)
- Harold Faltermeyer – keyboards (tracks 1, 3, 7, 10)
- Brian Reeves – additional keyboards (tracks 1, 3, 7, 10)
- Rick Ramirez – keyboards (tracks 2, 4–5, 8), guitar (tracks 2, 4–5, 8), bass guitar (tracks 2, 4–5, 8), additional backing vocals (track 5)
- Stephen Bray – synthesizer (track 6), bass guitar (track 6), drums (track 6)
- Rob Sabino – synthesizer (track 6)
- Keith Forsey – keyboards (track 9), synthesizer (track 9)
- Arthur Barrow – keyboards (track 9), synthesizer (track 9)
- Matts Björklund – guitar (tracks 1, 3, 7, 10)
- Ira Siegal – guitar (track 6)
- Eddie Martinez – guitar solo (track 6)
- Steve Schiff – guitar (track 9)
- Phil Kenzy – saxophone (track 2)
- John Faddis – trumpet (track 6), flugelhorn (track 6)
- Lawrence Feldman – alto flute, alto saxophone (track 6)
- Curt Cress – drums (tracks 1, 3, 7, 10)
- Toni C. – drums (track 6)
- Bashiri Johnson – percussion (track 6)

Production

- E. G. Daily – producer (tracks 2, 4–5, 8), drum programming (track 2)
- Harold Faltermeyer – producer (tracks 1, 3, 7, 10), arranger (tracks 1, 3, 7, 10), mixing (tracks 1, 3, 7, 10)
- Rick Ramirez – producer (tracks 2, 4–5, 8), engineer (track 2), drum programming (track 2)
- John "Jellybean" Benitez – producer (track 6)
- Keith Forsey – producer (track 9), mixing (track 9), drum programming (track 9)
- Brian Reeves – engineer (tracks 1, 3, 7, 10), mixing (tracks 3, 7, 9, 10)
- Michael Hutchinson – engineer (track 6), mixing (track 6), recording (track 6)
- Dave Cooke – second engineer (tracks 1, 3, 7, 10)
- Fernando Kral, Glenn Rosenstein, Melanie West – additional engineers (track 6)
- David J. Holman – mixing (tracks 2, 4–5, 8)
- Stephen Bray – arranger (track 6)
- Toni C. – arranger (track 6), copyist (track 6)
- Doreen Dorion – production coordinator (track 6)
- Arnie Acosta – mastering (tracks 2, 4–5, 8)

Other

- Chuck Beeson – art direction
- Melanie Nissen – art direction, art design
- Victoria Pearson – photography
- Gerber-Rodkin Company – management and direction
