= Down and Counting =

Single by Claudja Barry

from the album I, Claudja
- B-side: "Down and Counting (Emulator Dub)"
- Released: 1986
- Genre: Hi-NRG
- Length: 4:12
- Label: Epic Records
- Songwriter(s): Claudja Barry, Evers, Korduletsch
- Producer(s): Jörg Evers, Jürgen S. Korduletsch

"Down and Counting" is a 1986 single by Jamaican-born singer/actress, Claudja Barry. The single was her most successful on the dance charts peaking at number one for one week. The single did not chart on the Hot 100 and barely charted on the soul singles chart, stalling at number ninety-eight.
