= The Earons =

Astro-funk band

The Earons are a self-described "astro-funk" band from Tampa Bay, Florida. They were inspired by the cosmic mythology of Sun Ra with a bit of Anthony Braxton's mathematica.

Group members use the following stage names: .28 (a.k.a. Henry Pizzicarola, vocals), .22 (Percival Prince, guitar), .33 (Kevin Nance, keyboards), .69 (Melvin Lee, bass) and .18 (Lonnie Ferguson, drums). In 1984 they topped the Hot Dance Music/Club Play chart with "Land of Hunger", which also reached 36 on the Billboard R&B Chart. To date, they have only released one album, Hear on Earth, on LP and cassette (it has never been released on CD).

The concept of the band came from Zecharia Sitchin's book The Twelfth Planet and his writing about the Sumer civilisation.

On Friday, November 21, 2008, the band surfaced again on a new official website which proclaimed that the Earons were still "here on Earth". Four new songs - "Future", "Numbers and Wires", "Juliana's Cloth", and "Written in America" - were posted, along with the video for "Land of Hunger".

== See also ==
- List of number-one dance hits (United States)
- List of artists who reached number one on the US Dance chart
