= No Favors (Temper song) =

Single by Temper
- B-side: "No Favors" (dub version)
- Released: 1984
- Length: 3:46 (7" version); 7:10 (12" version)
- Label: MCA
- Songwriter(s): Cleveland Wright III, Anthony Malloy
- Producer(s): Cleveland Wright III, Anthony Malloy

"No Favors" is a song by Temper. The song went to number one for one week on the Billboard Disco/Dance chart in 1984. The single also peaked at No. 64 on the R&B chart.

"No Favors" was written and produced by Cleveland Wright III and Anthony Malloy.
