= Say It, Say It =

Single by E. G. Daily

from the album Wild Child
- Released: 1986
- Genre: R&B; pop
- Length: 4:34
- Label: A&M
- Songwriters: E. G. Daily; Stephen Bray; Toni C.
- Producer: John "Jellybean" Benitez

E. G. Daily singles chronology
"Say It, Say It" (1986)	"Love In the Shadows" (1986)

Music video
- "Say It, Say It" on YouTube

"Say It, Say It" is the debut single by American singer–songwriter (and future voice actress) E. G. Daily. It was released in 1985 as the lead single from her debut album Wild Child. The single went to number one on the U.S. Dance Club Play chart for one week. On other US charts, "Say It, Say It" went to number 71 on the soul chart and number 70 on the Hot 100.

== Track listings ==
7" single (1986)

1. "Say It, Say It" – 4:34
2. "Don't Let Them Take the Child Away" – 3:35

12" single (1986)

1. "Say It, Say It" (Extended version) – 6:52
2. "Say It, Say It" – 4:34
3. "Say It, Say It" (Dub version) – 4:40

UK 12" single (1986)

1. "Say It, Say It" (Extended version) – 6:52
2. "Say It, Say It" (Dub version) – 4:40
3. "Don't Let Them Take the Child Away" – 3:35

A&M Extended Memories 12" single (1989)

1. "Livin' It Up (Friday Night)" (performed by Bell and James) – 7:03
2. "Say It, Say It" (Extended version) – 6:52

== Charts ==
=== Weekly charts ===
Chart (1986)	Peak position
Belgium (Ultratop 50 Flanders)	8
Canada (RPM)	46
Netherlands (Dutch Top 40)	11
Netherlands (Single Top 100)	13
Italy (FIMI)	22
New Zealand (Recorded Music NZ)	14
UK Singles Chart	121
US Billboard Hot 100	70
US Dance Club Songs (Billboard)	1
US Hot Black Singles (Billboard)	71

=== Year-end charts ===
Chart (1986)	Position
Belgium (Ultratop Flanders)	93

== Music video ==
The music video for the song is a take of the 1962 film, Lolita.
