= E. G. Daily =

American actress (born 1961)

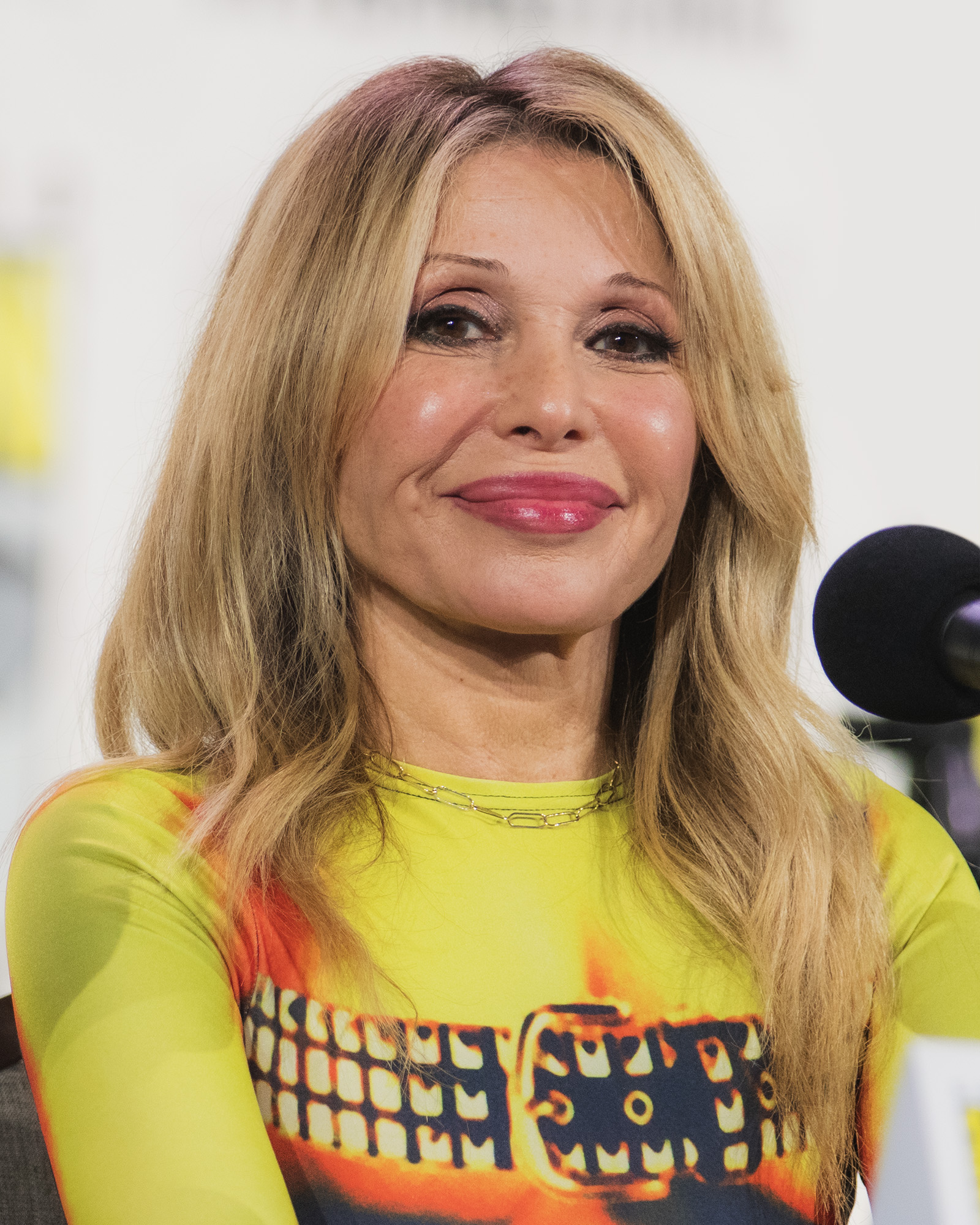
- Daily in 2026
- Born: Elizabeth Ann Guttman; September 11, 1961 (age 65); Los Angeles, California, U.S.
- Other name: Elizabeth Daily
- Occupations: Actress; singer
- Years active: 1978–present
- Spouse: Rick Salomon (m. 1995; div. 2000)
- Children: 2
- Website: egdaily.com

Elizabeth Ann Guttman (born September 11, 1961), known professionally as E. G. Daily or Elizabeth Daily, is an American actress and singer. In animation, Daily is known for voicing Buttercup on The Powerpuff Girls (1998–2005), Tommy Pickles on Rugrats (1991–2004) and its spin-off All Grown Up (2003–2008), Rudy Tabootie on ChalkZone (2002–2008), and Julius on Julius Jr. (2013–2015). She also voiced the title character in the live-action film Babe: Pig in the City (1998), Bamm-Bamm Rubble in the live-action film The Flintstones, and Froggy in The Little Rascals (both 1994).

Daily is also known for her roles in a variety of live-action films such as Valley Girl (1983), No Small Affair, Streets of Fire (both 1984), Pee-wee's Big Adventure, Fandango (both 1985), Dogfight (1991), The Devil's Rejects (2005), and My Sister's Keeper (2009). As a singer, Daily has released four studio albums: Wild Child (1985), Lace Around the Wound (1989), Tearing Down the Walls (1999), and Changing Faces (2008).

== Career ==
=== Voice acting ===
Daily in September 2026

Daily has voiced animated characters such as Buttercup in The Powerpuff Girls and Tommy Pickles in Rugrats, a role that she reprised for its revival on Paramount+, and Freefall / Roxy Spaulding in the film Gen^{13} and Private Isabel "Dizzy" Flores in Roughnecks: Starship Troopers Chronicles. She provided the voice for the lead role in the live-action feature film Babe: Pig in the City, replacing Christine Cavanaugh. More recently from 2013 to 2015, she played the title character on the TV show Julius Jr., and was recently Hinoka from Fire Emblem Fates.

=== Live-action roles ===
Besides doing voice-overs, Daily has acted in film and on TV. She played Sandy Burns on the PBS series The Righteous Apples from 1980 to 1981. In the mid-1980s, she starred as Dottie in Pee-wee's Big Adventure, as Loryn in Valley Girl, and as a singer in the comedy Better Off Dead. She also appeared on such television shows as Laverne & Shirley, CHiPs, Fame and Friends. She was also in the music video for Rod Stewart's song "Young Turks" as Patti, one of the runaway teens. She has been cast in several Rob Zombie films, most recently in 2015 as Sex-Head in Rob Zombie's 31, the woman on the side of Torsten Voges, who plays Death-Head.

=== Music ===
Daily signed with A&M Records in 1985, working with Madonna's frequent collaborators John "Jellybean" Benitez and Stephen Bray. In 1986, that label released the R&B/Rock single "Say It, Say It". The song made it to No. 70 on the Billboard Hot 100, and the No. 1 spot on the Hot Dance Music/Club Play chart. (Other versions of the song appeared as early as 1981). Her songs "Shake It Up" and "I'm Hot Tonight" were included in the soundtrack to the film Scarface. Those same songs were later included in the lineup of fictional radio station Flashback 95.6 FM in the Grand Theft Auto III video game. They were also included in the Scarface: The World Is Yours video game, based on the 1983 film. Her hit "Love in the Shadows" was featured in the films Thief of Hearts and Circuit.

Also in 1985, she provided backup vocals for The Human League frontman Philip Oakey's debut solo album, Philip Oakey & Giorgio Moroder. That same year, she appeared in the comedy film Better Off Dead, singing the songs "One Way Love (Better Off Dead)" and "A Little Luck" as a member of a band performing at a high school dance. Both songs were included on the soundtrack album credited to E. G. Daily. She performed a song on The Breakfast Club soundtrack called "Waiting".

In 1987, she released the song "Mind over Matter", which is featured in the film Summer School. Daily plays guitar, harmonica, keyboards, and percussion instruments. In her 1989 song, "Some People", from her Lace Around the Wound album, produced by Lotti Golden and Tommy Faragher, she plays guitar and harmonica. In 1999, she released her third studio album Tearing Down the Walls.

Daily released a song titled "Changing Faces" in 2003. The song was used on the end credits of Rugrats Go Wild. She also released a single titled "Beautiful" which she made available through iTunes on April 29, 2008. She also sang the song "Dawn's Theme", which was used at the beginning and end of the movie Streets. From 2003 to 2011, Daily did the voice-over of Jake Harper singing the Two and a Half Men song.

Her genres are country, dance, pop, and rock.

In fall 2013, Daily sang as a contestant on the fifth season of the NBC reality show The Voice. In the blind audition broadcast on September 24, 2013, she sang "Breathe" from Faith Hill. Two of the four judges on the show, Blake Shelton and CeeLo Green, turned around their chairs for her. She chose to be on Team Blake. Daily proceeded to win her battle in the show's battle rounds singing the song "Something to Talk About". She lost in the Knockout Rounds, with a performance of Bonnie Raitt's "I Can't Make You Love Me".

== Personal life ==
Daily dated actor Jon-Erik Hexum and was his girlfriend at the time of his accidental death in 1984. Daily married high-stakes poker player Rick Salomon in 1995. They had two daughters before divorcing in 2000.

She is Jewish.

== Filmography ==
=== Film ===
Year	Title	Role	Notes
1978	Jukebox	Audition Dancer	Credited as Elizabeth Guttman
1981	Street Music	Sadie Deleward	
1982	One Dark Night	Leslie Winslow	
1982	The Escape Artist	Sandra	
1982	Wacko	Bambi	
1982	Ladies and Gentlemen, The Fabulous Stains	Motel Maid	
1983	Funny Money	Cass	
1983	Valley Girl	Loryn	
1984	Streets of Fire	"Baby Doll"	
1984	No Small Affair	Susan	
1985	Fandango	Judy	
1985	Pee-wee's Big Adventure	Dottie	
1985	Better Off Dead	Singer	
1988	Bad Dreams	Lana	
1989	Loverboy	Linda	
1991	Dutch	Halley	
1991	Dogfight	Marcie	
1992	Lorenzo's Oil	Vocal effects for Lorenzo	
1994	The Little Rascals	Dubbing voice of Froggy	
1994	The Flintstones	Dubbing voice of Bamm-Bamm	Uncredited
1995	A Goofy Movie	Additional Voices	
1998	The Rugrats Movie	Tommy Pickles	
1998	Babe: Pig in the City	Babe	
1999	We Wish You a Merry Christmas	Ted	
1999	Gen^{13}	"Freefall"	
2000	Bob's Video	V.C.	
2000	Alvin and the Chipmunks Meet the Wolfman	Nathan	Direct-to-video
2000	Rugrats in Paris: The Movie	Tommy Pickles	
2000	Recess: School's Out	Cap'n Sticky	
2001	The Trumpet of the Swan	Ella	
2002	The Making and Meaning of 'We Are Family'		Documentary
2002	The Powerpuff Girls Movie	Buttercup	
2002	The Country Bears	Beary Barrington (singing voice)	
2003	Rugrats Go Wild	Tommy Pickles	
2005	Potheads: The Movie	Mrs. B. Johnson	
2005	The Devil's Rejects	Candy	
2006	Cutting Room	Joanne Kramer	
2006	Mustang Sally	Sally "Mustang Sally"	
2006	Happy Feet	Baby Mumble	
2006	National Lampoon's Pledge This!	Catherine Johnson	
2008	Gnomes and Trolls: The Secret Chamber	Junior	
2009	My Sister's Keeper	Nurse Susan	
2009	Curious George: A Very Monkey Christmas	Steve, Andie	
2010	Cats & Dogs: The Revenge of Kitty Galore	Scrumptious / Patches / Catherine's Niece	
2010	Gnomes and Trolls: The Forest Trial	Junior	
2011	Boy Toy	Helen	Video credited as "E. G. Daily
2011	Happy Feet Two	Erik (singing voice only)/Additional Voices	
2012	Yellow	Aunt Netty	
2012	Wreck-It Ralph	Additional Voices	
2013	I Know That Voice	Herself	Documentary film on voice acting
2013	Curious George: Swings Into Spring	Steve, Andie	
2014	The Hero of Color City	Ben / Mom / Tutti Frutti / Neon Lime	
2015	Toy Soldier	Young Logan	
2016	31	"Sex-Head"	
2016	Pizza Mouse	Alice Mouse	
2016	Mothers and Daughters	Momma Quinn	
2017	The Emoji Movie	Additional Voices	
2020	Valley Girl	Mrs. Bowen	
TBA	Concert Heroes †		

Key
†	Denotes films that have not yet been released

=== Short films ===
Year	Title	Role	Notes
1985	The Orkly Kid	Carrissa	
2004	Stop That Cycle	Mom	
2004	Wait		
2007	Up-In-Down Town	Binko (voice)	
2015	Father Mud	Mary	
2015	Toy Soldier	Young Logan (voice)	
2020	Underlings	Arthur	

=== Television and animation ===
Year	Title	Role	Notes
1979	Laverne & Shirley	Rita	Season 5, Episode 8
1980–1981	The Righteous Apples	Sandy Burns	11 episodes
1982	CHiPs	Caroll Sweeney	Season 5, Episode 17
1986	Saturday Night Live	Herself	Musical guest (episode 212, May 17, 1986)
1987	Popples	Potato Chip	Live-action pilot
1989	Camp Candy	Rick / Alex / Binky	Season 3
1991–2004	Rugrats	Tommy Pickles / Susie Carmichael / Baby Stu Pickles / Various Voices	172 episodes
1992	Darkwing Duck	Lightwave	Episode: "The Frequency Fiends"
1992–1997	Eek! The Cat	Wendy Elizabeth (voice)	30 episodes
1993	Teenage Mutant Ninja Turtles	Quarx (voice)	Episode: "The Star Child"
1994	Aaahh!!! Real Monsters	P.A., Wardrobe (voice)	Episode: "Krumm Goes Hollywood"
1994–1997	Duckman	Mambo (voice)	15 episodes
1995	Bump in the Night	Germ Girls (voice)	1 episode
1995–1996	What-a-Mess	Voices	3 episodes
1995, 1997	The What-a-Cartoon! Show	Buttercup (voice)	2 episodes
1996	Timon & Pumbaa	Girl (voice)	Episode: "Shopping Mauled/Library Brouhaha"
1996	Cave Kids	Bamm-Bamm Rubble (singing voice)	8 episodes
1996	Jungle Cubs	Bagheera (voice)	13 episodes
1996	Animated Hero Classics	Helen Keller (voice)	Episode: "Helen Keller"; credited as Elizabeth Guttman
1996	Gargoyles	Alexander Xanatos, Angry Voices	2 episodes
1996	Quack Pack	Louie Duck (voice)	39 episodes
1996, 1998	The Spooktacular New Adventures of Casper	Nicole / Cinderella / Various Voices	2 episodes
1997	Friends	Leslie (as E. G. Daily)	Episode: "The One with Phoebe's Ex-Partner"
1997	Spicy City	Nisa (voice)	Episode: "Sex Drive"
1997–1998	The Crayon Box	Piggy Banks (voice)	
1997–2001	Recess	Various Voices	4 episodes
1998	The New Batman Adventures	Thrift Store Manager (voice)	Episode: "Beware the Creeper"
1998–2005	The Powerpuff Girls	Buttercup, various voices	78 episodes
1998–1999	Oh Yeah! Cartoons	Rudy Tabootie, Nerd, Ben, Boris	5 episodes
1999	Hey Arnold!	Jimmy Maldonado, Bunny Spumoni	Episode: "Dino Checks Out"
1999–2000	Roughnecks: Starship Troopers Chronicles	Private Isabelle 'Dizzy' Flores (voice)	12 episodes
1999–2002	The New Woody Woodpecker Show	Knothead (voice)	15 episodes
2000–2002	Baby Blues	Zoe / Birthday Lady (singing voice)	
2000	Clifford the Big Red Dog	Cousin Laura (voice)	Episode: "Clifford's Doggy Reunion"
2001–2007	What's with Andy?	Additional Voices	5 episodes
2002–2008	ChalkZone	Rudy Tabootie (voice) / Various Voices	40 episodes
2003–2008	All Grown Up!	Tommy Pickles (voice) / Various Voices	52 episodes
2003–2010	Two and a Half Men	Jake Harper (voice – opening theme song)	
2004	Game Over	Billy Smashenburn / Zenna	6 episodes
2005	Danger Rangers	Bobby / Kid / Sparky	
2006	Wow! Wow! Wubbzy!	Additional Voices	
2006–2015	Curious George	Steve / Various Voices	44 episodes
2007	The Land Before Time	Rhett / Shorty (voice)	2 episodes
2007	Random! Cartoons	Victor / One-Eyed Bird / Co Worker No. 1 (voice)	Episode: "Victor the Delivery Dog"
2007–2008	Ni Hao, Kai-Lan	Mr. Hoppy (voice)	2 episodes
2008	Rahan	Tetya / Shadow Queen	26 episodes
2010–2012	The Avengers: Earth's Mightiest Heroes	Bobbi Morse/Mockingbird, Veranke	5 episodes
2010–2013	Pound Puppies	Dolly / Mom (2) / Tipper / Scout / Various Voices	22 episodes
2013	The Voice	Herself - Contestant	
2013–2015	Julius Jr.	Julius Junior (voice)	51 episodes
2014	TripTank	Anthony / Sean / Kids (voice)	3 episodes
2014, 2016	Uncle Grandpa	Additional Voices	2 episodes
2016	Avengers Assemble	Moonstone / Meteorite (voice)	3 episodes
2016	The Middle	Daphne	Episode: "The Wisdom Teeth"
2017	Adam Ruins Everything	Student (voice)	Episode: "Adam Ruins What We Learned in School"
2017–2020	Dorothy and the Wizard of Oz	Captain Bill (voice)	Episode: "Cap'n Bill in Going Nowhere Fast"
2018	Puppy Dog Pals	Receptionist / Attendant	Episode: "The Great Pug-scape/Luck of the Pug-ish"
2019	Rise of the Teenage Mutant Ninja Turtles	Prairie Dog / Honey Badger (voice)	Episode: "Pizza Pit"
2020	Tigtone	Elder Zuzzlekin / Tonden Mora (voice)	2 episodes
2021	Long Gone Gulch	Rawhide (voice)	
2021	Kid Cosmic	Agent Green	
2021–2026	Rugrats	Tommy Pickles (voice)	
2022	To Tell the Truth	Contestant	
2025	Jellystone!	Buttercup (voice)	Episode: "Crisis on Infinite Mirths"
2026	Cyberpunk: Edgerunners 2	Kyoko (voice)	English dub

=== Video games ===
Year	Title	Role	Notes
1995	Stonekeep	Sweetie Surly	
1997	Duckman: The Graphic Adventures of a Private Dick	Mambo	
1997	Pajama Sam's Sock Works	Pajama Sam	
1998	The Rugrats Movie Activity Challenge	Tommy Pickles	
1998	Rugrats Adventure Game	Tommy Pickles	
1998	Rugrats: Search for Reptar	Tommy Pickles	
1999	Rugrats: Studio Tour	Tommy Pickles	
2000	Rugrats in Paris: The Movie	Tommy Pickles	
2000	Nicktoons Racing	Tommy Pickles	Archival recordings
2001	Rugrats: Totally Angelica	Tommy Pickles	
2001	Nicktoons Nick Tunes	Tommy Pickles	
2001	Rugrats: All Growed Up	Tommy Pickles	
2001	The Powerpuff Girls: Mojo Jojo's Pet Project	Buttercup	
2001	The Powerpuff Girls: Chemical X-traction	Buttercup	
2002	Rugrats: Royal Ransom	Tommy Pickles	
2002	Nickelodeon Party Blast	Tommy Pickles	
2002	The Powerpuff Girls: Relish Rampage	Buttercup	
2003	Rugrats Go Wild!	Tommy Pickles	
2003	Nickelodeon Toon Twister 3-D	Tommy Pickles	
2004	The Incredibles	Helen Parr / Elastigirl	
2004	The Incredibles: When Danger Calls	Helen Parr / Elastigirl	
2006	Baten Kaitos Origins	Wacho	
2006	Downhill Jam	Fei Liu	
2006	Happy Feet	Baby Mumble / Baby Gloria	
2006	Cartoon Network Racing	Buttercup	
2008	Speed Racer: The Videogame	Rosey Blaze	
2009	Cartoon Network Universe: FusionFall	Buttercup	
2009	Marvel: Ultimate Alliance 2	Jessica Drew / Spider-Woman	
2012	Skylanders: Giants	Sprocket	
2013	Skylanders: Swap Force	Sprocket	
2014	Skylanders: Trap Team	Sprocket	
2015	Skylanders: SuperChargers	Sprocket	
2016	Fire Emblem Fates	Hinoka	
2016	Doom	UAC Facility Voice	Credited as E. G. Daily
2020	Doom Eternal	UAC Facility Voice	
2024	Multiversus	Buttercup	
2025	Nicktoons & The Dice of Destiny	Tommy Pickles	

== Discography ==
=== Albums ===
Title	Album details
Wild Child	Released: 1985; Label: A&M; Formats: CD, LP, cassette
Lace Around the Wound	Released: May 25, 1989; Label: A&M; Formats: CD, LP, cassette
Tearing Down the Walls	Released: April 13, 1999; Label: EGDP; Formats: CD
Changing Faces	Released: 2008; Label: EGDP; Formats: CD

=== Singles ===
Year	Title	Peak chart positions									Album
Year	Title	US	US Club	US Dance	US R&B	CAN	IT	NL	NZ	UK	Album
1985	"One Way Love (Better Off Dead)"	–	-	-	–	–	–	-	–	–	Better Off Dead: Original Soundtrack
1986	"Say It, Say It"	70	1	4	71	46	22	13	14	121	Wild Child
1986	"Love in the Shadows"	–	6	14	–	–	–	37	–	–	Wild Child
1987	"Mind Over Matter"	–	7	17	–	–	–	–	–	96	Summer School soundtrack
1989	"Some People"	–	33	–	–	–	–	–	–	–	Lace Around the Wound
1989	"Heart Don't Lie"	–	–	–	–	–	–	–	–	–	Lace Around the Wound
1990	"This Time"	–	–	–	–	–	–	–	–	–	Lace Around the Wound
1999	"Don't Even Care"	–	–	–	–	–	–	–	–	–	Tearing Down the Walls
1999	"Breath of Heaven"	–	–	–	–	–	–	–	–	–	Tearing Down the Walls
2003	"Changing Faces"	–	–	–	–	–	–	–	–	–	Changing Faces
2009	"Life Is Just a Bowl of Cherries"	–	–	–	–	–	–	–	–	–	My Sister's Keeper Soundtrack
2010	"Beautiful"	–	–	–	–	–	–	–	–	–	Changing Faces
2010	"Somebody's Loving You"	–	–	–	–	–	–	–	–	–	Non-album singles
2018	"So Pretty"	–	–	–	–	–	–	–	–	–	Non-album singles

== See also ==
- List of number-one dance hits (United States)
- List of artists who reached number one on the US Dance chart
