= Squee =

Squee may refer to:

- Squee!, a comic book series
  - Squee (character), main character of the series
- Viv "Squee" Allen, ice hockey player
- Squee, a character in the Magic: The Gathering trading card game
- Squee, an animal seen in the computer game Myst III: Exile
- Squee, the death rattle of a robot in the Magnus: Robot Fighter comic
- Squee, an extraterrestrial in Alien TV

== See also ==
- Squeal (disambiguation)
- Squealer (disambiguation)
