= List of Bravest Warriors episodes =

Bravest Warriors is an animated web series created by Pendleton Ward, the creator of Adventure Time.

Set in the year 3085, the series follows four teenage heroes-for-hire as they warp through the universe to save adorable aliens and their worlds using the power of their emotions. The animated series began streaming on Frederator's Cartoon Hangover channel on YouTube from November 8, 2012. The series is based on a short produced for Frederator's Nicktoons animation incubator series Random! Cartoons that aired on January 10, 2009. A comic book adaptation published by Boom! Studios ran from October 2012 to September 2015 for 36 issues.

The show won the Shorty Award for Best Web Show in 2013 and was nominated in the Annecy International Animated Film Festival. It is also a 2015 Webby Award honoree.

Frederator Studios and Nelvana began production on a Bravest Warriors television series, which follows on from the web series. The first season of the series is accordingly considered as the fourth season.

== Series overview ==
Season	Episodes	Originally released		
Season	Episodes	First released	Last released	Network
Pilot		January 10, 2009		Nicktoons
1	12	November 8, 2012	July 18, 2013	YouTube
Minisodes	5	August 8, 2013	September 13, 2013	YouTube
2	12	October 17, 2013	June 12, 2014	YouTube
3	6	January 10, 2017	March 7, 2017	VRV
4	52	December 25, 2017	December 24, 2018	VRV

== Episodes ==
=== Pilot (2009) ===
No.	Title	Directed by	Written by	Original release date	Prod. code
0	"The Bravest Warriors"	Randy Myers & Pendleton Ward	Pendleton Ward	January 10, 2009	N/A
Chris, Beth, Danny, and Wallow save the brain dogs from the tickle monster.

=== Season 1 (2012–2013) ===
No. overall	No. in season	Title	Directed by	Written by	Air date	Prod. code
1	1	"Time Slime"	Breehn Burns	Tom King	November 8, 2012	BW101
The Bravest Warriors, in place of their parents the Courageous Battlers, assist Supreme Chancellor Gayle from the Moon of Glendale when Professor Fartsparkles' Fartsparkles Time Generator causes a Fartsparkles Effect, trapping the Bravest Warriors and all of the Moon of Glendale in an overlapping time loop.
2	2	"Emotion Lord"	Breehn Burns	Kris Wimberly	November 15, 2012	BW102
After a mission on the planet Zgraxxis, the Bravest Warriors wonder about the strange turn of events, leaving Danny with Zgraxxis Fever and Beth with a tail. However, all attempts to save Danny's life are disrupted by an omnipotent being known as an Emotion Lord.
3	3	"Butter Lettuce"	Breehn Burns	Brett Varon	November 29, 2012	BW103
Chris plays a video game in the Holo-John, eventually joined by Wallow and Danny, and after winning, has problems with the Beth hologram Danny has programmed to be 30% more sexier, particularly after Beth walks in on them all.
4	4	"Memory Donk"	Breehn Burns	Tom King	December 6, 2012	BW104
While on a bus the Bravest Warriors have lost all of their memories, as do all of the other passengers and the driver who ejects himself. The gang must figure out how to stop the bus before it crashes into the Mars Convention Center, all while dealing with the memory stealing Memory Donk.
5	5	"The Bunless"	Breehn Burns	Bob Boyle	December 13, 2012	BW105
If two extradimensional beings do not fall back in love with each other again, the people of Bunless 9 will suffer through 100 years of war and darkness. To this end, Wallow hosts a dance mixer, and has Chris and Beth use their butts to host the two beings.
6	6	"Lavarinth"	Breehn Burns	James Burks	December 20, 2012	BW106
While the Bravest Warriors try to destroy the hive of the firebugs, the Emotion Lord returns with a surprising fact: that he is Chris from nearly 180 years in the future.
7	7	"Gas Powered Stick"	Breehn Burns	Carlos Ramos	January 10, 2013	BW107
Beth's merewif friend Plum drops by for a visit, and Danny and Wallow do their best to try to impress her. Meanwhile, the Emotion Lord gives Impossibear a gas-powered stick that never runs out of gas.
8	8	"Dan Before Time"	Breehn Burns	Kris Wimberly	January 24, 2013	BW108
Danny invents a time machine so he can go back in time to seek revenge on the Low Gravity Hacker Pack who made his childhood horrible after they made a device that could make him barf at the press of a button.
9	9	"Cereal Master"	Breehn Burns	Jeanette Moreno King	February 7, 2013	BW110
Danny accompanies Chris to get Beth a bowl of Moon Frosted Double Dolphin Smax for their ten-year jinx-aversary. But the Cereal Master's refusal to add Beth's favorite ingredient causes Chris's latent Emotion Lord powers to surface, spurring an interplanetary chase to make sure Beth gets her cereal and so Chris does not tell on the Cereal Master's father.
10	10	"Ultra Wankershim"	Breehn Burns	James Burks	February 21, 2013	BW111
Wankershim leaves the Holo-John as a flesh and blood creature, but he soon grows to gigantic proportions. The Bravest Warriors try to figure out what to do when the Emotion Lord shows up for the Dawning of Wankershim to tell the Bravest Warriors that "it's always been Wankershim" and to help Chris awaken his Emotion Lord powers, without causing a tear in the Space-Time Calliope that may result in a Temporal Pair-of-Socks.
11	11	"Catbug"	Breehn Burns	Tom King	March 7, 2013	BW112
The Bravest Warriors discover that Catbug can travel to and from the See-Through Zone and he has been returning with gifts from their parents, except Beth's father. However, the gifts seem to be covered in a strange virus that mutates into a door, leaving them with one final message: "Ralph Waldo Pickle Chips is the key".
12	12	"Sugarbellies"	Breehn Burns	Rayfield Angrum	July 18, 2013	BW109
The Bravest Warriors come to the assistance of the Sugarbelly aliens whose planets have gone out of a particular alignment and causes all in the area to no longer be able to speak clearly. Danny must plug a power cord into a crystalline planet, Wallow must figure out how to turn on two power switches while avoiding a set of robotic guard dogs, Chris must figure out the right tune to play on an organ the Sugarbellies will sing, and Beth must prove herself to the Sugarbellies otherwise no one will be able to speak again.

=== Minisodes (2013) ===
No. in season	Title	Directed by	Written by	Air Date
1	"Moo-Phobia"	Breehn Burns	Niki Yang	August 8, 2013
Chris's fear of cows keeps him from joining the others on a mission.
2	"DramaBug"	Breehn Burns	Tyler Chen	August 15, 2013
Catbug plays with his toys with soap opera-worthy drama.
3	"Browser Fail"	Breehn Burns	Ryan Pequin	August 22, 2013
Danny wakes up to realize his eyebrows have been shaved off in his sleep.
4	"Impossibomb"	Breehn Burns	Tyler Chen	September 6, 2013
Impossibear shows up with a present for Wallow, not knowing that it is actually a bomb.
5	"Terrabeth Bytes"	Breehn Burns	Parker Simmons	September 13, 2013
Beth sumo wrestles with Wallow.

=== Season 2 (2013–2014) ===
No. overall	No. in season	Title	Directed by	Written by	Storyboard by	Air Date	Prod. code
13	1	"Aeon Worm"	Breehn Burns	Breehn Burns & Jason Johnson	James Burks	October 17, 2013	BW201
Beth and her horse find their way into the See-Through Zone where Beth decides to save her father, who has since become known as "Ralph Waldo Pickle Chips" in his service to the evil Aeon Worm.
14	2	"RoboChris"	Breehn Burns	Ryan North	Nate Villanueva	October 31, 2013	BW202
Danny creates a robotic Chris duplicate to be his new best friend in an attempt to make the real Chris jealous. However, things didn't go as planned.
15	3	"Mexican Touchdown"	Breehn Burns	Breehn Burns & Jason Johnson	Bob Boyle	November 14, 2013	BW203
Plum and Danny go on a mission together. Danny confesses his love for Plum, but Plum does not reciprocate.
16	4	"Hamster Priest"	Breehn Burns	Breehn Burns & Jason Johnson	Brandon Kruse	December 5, 2013	BW204
Beth begins to experience strange changes around her which are all tied to a device her father smuggled back with him from the See-Through Zone. Note: Several references to the Star Trek franchise are in here, such as the Mirror Mirror Universe, the crew and bridge of the Enterprise-D, and Danny briefly turns into Commander Worf while Beth is talking to him.
17	5	"Jelly Kid Forever"	Breehn Burns	Breehn Burns & Jason Johnson	James Burks	December 19, 2013	BW205
Catbug kills Jelly Kid, and Danny doesn't take it well.
18	6	"The Puppetyville Horror"	Breehn Burns	Jhonen Vasquez	Kris Wimberly & Christofer Graham	January 23, 2014	BW206
The Bravest Warriors make a stop on a strange yellow moon due to some toilet problems and soon after they begin to disappear one by one.
19	7	"Catbug's Away Team"	Breehn Burns	Breehn Burns & Jason Johnson	Brandon Kruse	February 6, 2014	BW207
With an alien race in trouble from Wankershim, the Bravest Warriors have Catbug form an away team to teach him responsibility while they work to save the aliens.
20	8	"Merewif Tag"	Breehn Burns	Breehn Burns & Jason Johnson	Joseph Orrantia & James Burks	February 20, 2014	BW208
Chris and Plum switch bodies for fun, or so it seems. A kiss ends up fracturing someone's timeline.
21	9	"The Dimension Garden"	Breehn Burns	ND Stevenson, Breehn Burns & Jason Johnson	Josh Pruett	March 6, 2014	BW209
A mysterious worm invades the Invisible hideout.
22	10	"The Parasox Pub"	Breehn Burns	Breehn Burns & Jason Johnson	James Burks	May 22, 2014	BW210
With the help of his future selves, Chris sets out to change his destiny.
23	11	"Season of the Worm"	Breehn Burns	Breehn Burns & Jason Johnson	Tyson Hesse	June 5, 2014	BW211
The Bravest Warriors follow Hamster Mitch in an effort to track down Ralph Waldo Pickle Chips.
24	12	"Season of the Mitch"	Breehn Burns	Breehn Burns & Jason Johnson	Tyson Hesse	June 12, 2014	BW212
Beth takes down Ralph Waldo Pickle Chips. Meanwhile, Mitch decides his destiny.

=== Season 3 (2017) ===
Starting on January 10, 2017, season 3 episodes of Bravest Warriors were released on VRV, an on-demand service from Crunchyroll.

No. overall	No. in season	Title	Directed by	Written by	Storyboard by	Air Date	Prod. code
25	1	"Dan of Future Past"	Tom King	Breehn Burns & Jason Johnson	Antoine Guilbaud and Tom King	January 10, 2017	BW301
Chris returns home from the Parasox Pub, but arrives on Mars ten years too early. With his powers out of control, he is discovered by a young, unitard-clad Danny, who is more than enthusiastic about nurturing him back to health.
26	2	"Himmel Mancheese"	Tom King	Breehn Burns & Jason Johnson	TBA	January 10, 2017	BW302
To save a divided race of cute little aliens, the Warriors fly to their planet where Himmel is the only hope for peace. But when Wallow's unscrupulous attitude about hooking up with aliens destroys the kingdom's chance for peace, he is sentenced to death.
27	3	"Ghosts of the See-Through Zone"	Tom King	Breehn Burns & Jason Johnson	Fabien Tong	January 24, 2017	BW303
While spending the evening in the city with Plum, Beth is in turmoil over who she loves more: Chris or Danny, lamenting how either decision will tear apart the Bravest Warriors. Back home, in the meantime, the group is being torn apart by interdimensional phantasms.
28	4	"Fast Times at Saturn Oaks"	Tom King	Breehn Burns & Jason Johnson	TBA	February 7, 2017	BW304
At the Saturn Oaks Galleria--a popular teen hangout floating in the rings of Saturn--Chris must foil a food court heist before it's too late, but the crushing prospect of Beth falling for a new guy makes his mission all the more difficult.
29	5	"Everything is Okay"	Tom King	Breehn Burns & Jason Johnson	Fabien Tong	February 21, 2017	BW305
Catbug, Impossibear, and the other pets open the Invisible Hideout as a Bravest Warriors museum, while Hamster Mitch, AKA The Lord of Morality, is on a mission to seek the wisdom of the Paralyzed Horse.
30	6	"Emotion Fjord"	Tom King	Breehn Burns & Jason Johnson	TBA	March 7, 2017	BW306
Plum leads the Warriors to the Emotion Fjord to find Captain C Word, who can give Chris the protection he needs from deathly emoverload.

=== Season 4 (2017–2018) ===
No. overall	No. in season	Title	Directed by	Written by	Storyboard by	Air Date	Prod. code
31	1	"Whispers in the Morning"	Adrian Thatcher	Benjamin Townsend	Ted Collyer	December 25, 2017	BW401
When Chris's heart gets stabbed by a moop-infected flame sword, it's up to the rest of the Bravest Warriors to get him back to the ship... in time for Beth's date with another guy.
32	2	"Chained to Your Side"	Adrian Thatcher	Kate Leth	Don Kim and John Flagg	December 25, 2017	BW402
When her new beau stands her up for the annual 'Scaley Williams Day'-style dance, Beth flies solo for the couples' carnival games and competes against the other Bravest Warriors.
33	3	"Mirror's Reflection"	Adrian Thatcher	Ryan North	Rodney King	January 12, 2018	BW403
Worm clones from another dimension overtake the hideout, forcing the real Bravest Warriors to mobilize and murder their wormy selves.
34	4	"You've Grown So Tall, You've Grown So Fast"	Adrian Thatcher	Stephen W. Martin & Benjamin Townsend	Ted Collyer	January 12, 2018	BW404
Chris goes on a "vision quest" with the Emotion Lord while the Bravest Warriors try to solve a bi-dimensional baby crisis.
35	5	"From the Inside Room"	Adrian Thatcher	Story by : Zac Gorman; Teleplay by : Benjamin Townsend	Jason Armstrong	January 26, 2018	BW405
Danny struggles to serve his 1,000-year-long prison sentence for time crimes, but is helped by his new cellmate: the Reverend Picklechips.
36	6	"All I Wish Is to Be Alone"	Adrian Thatcher	Kevin Burke & Chris "Doc" Wyatt	David Bluestein	January 26, 2018	BW406
Jumpy after Puddingtown gives him an alarming tip about the other Emotion Lords, Chris, home alone, accidentally causes a violent revolt from the bathroom Elves.
37	7	"This Dance Ain't for Everybody"	Adrian Thatcher	Grace Ellis	Ted Collyer	February 9, 2018	BW407
Beth and Plum's big 'girls night out' at a trendy virtual nightclub sours when a creepy party crasher threatens to wreck the club and maybe the girls' friendship.
38	8	"A Few Stolen Moments"	Adrian Thatcher	Kelsey Calaitges	Rodney King	February 9, 2018	BW408
When Beth's new boy-toy gets roped into an alien rescue mission, it's his alone time with a moopy and volatile Chris that really puts him in danger.
39	9	"No Need to Argue"	Adrian Thatcher	Benjamin Townsend	John Flagg	February 23, 2018	BW409
On a trip to her home planet, Plum's strict parents catch her and Chris partaking in forbidden nums, forcing Chris into a fight to the death with Plum's jealous ex.
40	10	"We Can Leave Your Friends Behind"	Adrian Thatcher	Kevin Burke & Chris "Doc" Wyatt	Jason Armstrong	February 23, 2018	BW410
Himmel begins phasing back to his own time, leaving Wallow with the hardest choice of his life: bid farewell to love, or go with Himmel and bid farewell to the BWs forever!
41	11	"Sit Down Sip Some Bouillabaisse"	Adrian Thatcher	Steve Wolfhard	Cilbur Rocha	March 9, 2018	BW411
When Robochris hijacks the Space Whale for an unlikely quest, the BWs are knocked out, kidnapped, then trapped inside a living, breathing whale. After that, things get weird.
42	12	"Living in a Powder Keg"	Adrian Thatcher	Amalia Levari	Ted Collyer	March 9, 2018	BW412
With Chris and Beth locked in the holojohn during a sassy game of "Seven Moons in Uranus", the rest of the BWs must defend the Invisible Hideout from a Mechacat attack!
43	13	"This Is Not My Beautiful House"	Adrian Thatcher	Randolph Heard	Rodney King	March 23, 2018	BW413
Via a séance, Danny's mom sends him on a quest to his childhood home, where memories and a winning lottery ticket await... along with loads of sentient cockroaches.
44	14	"Footprints by the Garden Tree"	Adrian Thatcher	Grace Ellis	John Flagg	March 23, 2018	BW414
Gasp! Someone has eaten all of the cupcakes! Now it's up to Detective Catbug to solve the crime and ensure the culprit gets his just desserts... which is, to say, no dessert at all!
45	15	"Think I'll Miss This One This Year"	Adrian Thatcher	Benjamin Townsend	Jason Armstrong	April 6, 2018	BW415
Chris struggles to make it home in time to celebrate the first Wanksgiving, while the other BWs establish new holiday traditions.
46	16	"Nothin' Stays the Same"	Adrian Thatcher	Ryan North	Cilbur Rocha	April 6, 2018	BW416
With the BWs trapped in a time loop and repeatedly devoured by a Timegobbler, it's up to Beth to find an end to the cycle while experiencing infinite colorful deaths.
47	17	"I.O.U. for Your Love"	Adrian Thatcher	Steve Wolfhard	Ted Collyer	April 20, 2018	BW417
When alien bugs build a tiny feudal castle around their political prisoner, Danny, the BWs are enraptured by the intrigue within the bug's royal court.
48	18	"At Night When the Program's Through"	Adrian Thatcher	Tyler Chen	Rodney King	April 20, 2018	BW418
When the Invisible Hideout's food synthesizer gains sentience, the BWs name it E.D.G.A.R. and set about teaching it the mysteries of life.
49	19	"All I Get Is Static"	Adrian Thatcher	Kelsey Calaitges	Eugene McDermott	May 4, 2018	BW419
As Danny's new relationship with a super hot and legit girlfriend (who he's never met) heats up, Beth can't figure out why Zac is being so cold to her.
50	20	"I'm Smitten, I'm Bitten, I'm Hooked, I'm Cooked"	Adrian Thatcher	Steve Wolfhard	Jason Armstrong	May 4, 2018	BW420
When the BWs contract jelly pox, it's up to Catbug and his fellow pets to undertake an alien rescue mission, without anyone discovering they aren't the real BWs.
51	21	"A (Apple) B (Banana) C (Chili)"	Adrian Thatcher	Derek Iverson	Cilbur Rocha	May 18, 2018	BW421
Wallow's hanger reaches dangerous levels, forcing The BWs to make a quick pit stop at the Planet Mart – but the lure of consumerism threatens to stop them forever.
52	22	"Dance into the Fire"	Adrian Thatcher	Randolph Heard	Ted Collyer	May 18, 2018	BW422
The war between the Emotion Lords comes to a dramatic climax in an all-out merkathon, with Beth Tezuka as the ultimate prize!
53	23	"Craft of the Father"	Adrian Thatcher	Kelsey Calaitges	Rodney King	June 1, 2018	BW423
When Wallow discovers an abandoned alien egg, he vows to raise the baby as his own; but the high demands of parenting take a heavy toll on the teen dad.
54	24	"One in a Million Girls"	Adrian Thatcher	Kelsey Calaitges	Eugene McDermott	June 1, 2018	BW424
As Plum and Beth hit up the mall for a robo-modelling cattle call, Chris stumbles upon some difficult truths about Zachary Ryan.
55	25	"Enough to Last a Lifetime"	Adrian Thatcher	Tyler Chen	Jason Armstrong	June 15, 2018	BW425
When Danny crash lands on a desolate planet, he finds another shipwrecked crew's holo log to guide him through his survival, escape, and consumption of alien banan'ers.
56	26	"Will Things Ever Be the Same Again?"	Adrian Thatcher	Joey Comeau & Benjamin Townsend	Cilbur Rocha	June 15, 2018	BW426
The BWs go into their final throwdown with the Mecha Cats, while uncomfortably aware of a prophecy promising that one of them is going to get super merked.
57	27	"It Shouldn't Ever Have to End This Way – Part 1"	Adrian Thatcher	Joey Comeau & Benjamin Townsend	Ted Collyer	September 14, 2018	BW427
The Courageous Battlers protect the fuzzy parts of the universe from the slimy bits, all while raising families, and lately, dealing with some… inter-office turmoil.
58	28	"It Shouldn't Ever Have to End This Way – Part 2"	Adrian Thatcher	Joey Comeau & Benjamin Townsend	Rodney King	September 14, 2018	BW428
The Courageous Battlers were on the verge of breaking up - but now they're getting busted up by the Robolord and her army of giant Robobots…
59	29	"This Is Your Paradise"	Adrian Thatcher	Tyler Chen	Cilbur Rocha	September 21, 2018	BW429
Catbug doesn't care for everybody's moop over Chris's death, so he journeys into the afterlife to bring their friend back.
60	30	"Too High, Too Far, Too Soon"	Adrian Thatcher	Ryan North	Jason Armstrong	September 21, 2018	BW430
While on a contentious Spring Break trip, the BWs find a planet where time moves super fast, and accidentally populate it with their tiny clones—who then try to destroy one another.
61	31	"The Conscious Liberation of the Female State"	Adrian Thatcher	Grace Ellis	Ted Collyer	September 28, 2018	BW431
Beth's new role as captain of the BWs is challenged by a “Manet,” a planet of only sexist dudes, that really need to simmer down and let her save them already.
62	32	"Your Life Is in Your Hands"	Adrian Thatcher	Steve Wolfhard	Eugene McDermott	September 28, 2018	BW432
When aliens proclaim Danny to be The One from their ancient prophecies, Chris is suspicious and Danny is way too eager to please in his new role.
63	33	"The Crowd I'm Seeing"	Adrian Thatcher	Kelsey Cailaitges	Rodney King	October 5, 2018	BW433
After breaking-up with Zachary Ryan, Beth leaves to decompress with some "me time", finding solace in a brassy all-lady gang of punky geriatrics, the "Upta Gals".
64	34	"Everybody's Coming, Leave Your Body at the Door"	Adrian Thatcher	Jack Bernhardt	Cilbur Rocha	October 5, 2018	BW434
When the rest of the gang won't party with him, Danny invents a whole crew of RoboPartyAnimals with no "off" buttons—and they're down to fight for their right to get down.
65	35	"My Only Weakness Is a List of Crime"	Adrian Thatcher	Mike Holmes	Jason Armstrong	October 12, 2018	BW435
When the Bravest Warriors discover Catbug has been stealing 'treasures' during their interplanetary adventures, Chris takes it upon himself to teach him right from wrong.
66	36	"Decide What You Want from Me"	Adrian Thatcher	Joey Comeau	Ted Collyer	October 12, 2018	BW436
When Danny feels the Bravest Warriors would be better off without him, a strange extra-dimensional being takes him to see what life would be like if he never existed.
67	37	"You're Walkin' Tough Baby But You're Walkin' Blind – Part 1"	Adrian Thatcher	Tobi Wilson	Eugene McDermott	October 19, 2018	BW437
Chris reacquaints himself with a childhood friend, while the other BWs, who remember her as a jerk, nearly destroy the hide-out with a plot to reveal her true nature.
68	38	"You're Walkin' Tough Baby But You're Walkin' Blind – Part 2"	Adrian Thatcher	Jack Bernhardt & Tobi Wilson	Rodney King	October 19, 2018	BW438
The Bravest Warriors are called to do a no-brainer task at a Wankershim parade, but find it impossible to function or keep their memories straight - what gives?!
69	39	"You're Walkin' Tough Baby But You're Walkin' Blind – Part 3"	Adrian Thatcher	Jack Bernhardt & Tobi Wilson	Cilbur Rocha	October 26, 2018	BW439
After Jenna and her gang infiltrate the Hideout, the Bravest Warriors must fight to reclaim their home and compel Chris to remember that he's on their side!
70	40	"Maybe You Could Be Mine"	Adrian Thatcher	Amalia Levari	Jason Armstrong	October 26, 2018	BW440
When he thinks Plum is in danger, Chris's Emotion Lord powers get the best of him, and he winds up stalking her super creepy-like while she runs a series of mysterious errands.
71	41	"The Wire That Holds the Cork"	Adrian Thatcher	Gemma Arrowsmith	Ted Collyer	November 2, 2018	BW441
Danny creates a time machine that actually works! So well that it takes the BWs to a time before time, and they have to figure out how to make the Big Bang get bangin'.
72	42	"If You Don't Know Electric Co."	Adrian Thatcher	James Colley	Yu Su	November 2, 2018	BW442
As Chris's wonky Emotion Lord powers are blamed for strange issues with the Space Whale, he gets cray-cray convinced that they have a secret saboteur aboard.
73	43	"That Ain't Workin'"	Adrian Thatcher	John Omohundro	Rodney King	November 9, 2018	BW443
When Danny's girlfriend breaks up with him, he handles the painful emotions like a maturing young adult… by peddling them off to blackmarket Emotion Dealer for cash.
74	44	"Nice Day to Start Again"	Adrian Thatcher	Benjamin Townsend	Cilbur Rocha	November 9, 2018	BW444
When the Bravest Warriors attend Plum's sister's bonding ceremony, Chris must make Plum believe in true love in order to stabilize the timeline.
75	45	"Mouth is Alive with Juices Like Wine"	Adrian Thatcher	James Hamilton	Jason Armstrong	November 16, 2018	BW445
Wallow, deciding he wants to eat as ethically as possible, embarks on a faddish “ghost diet” - but the negative effects on both his physical and mental health quickly become apparent.
76	46	"Bang, Bang, Bang on the Door Baby"	Adrian Thatcher	Natasha Hodgson	Ted Collyer	November 16, 2018	BW446
After a big fight about some very uncool spoilers, the Bravest Warriors retreat to separate rooms to blow off steam. But each of them causes their own kind of disaster, resulting in unexpected revelation.
77	47	"I Just Can't Cope Without My Soap"	Adrian Thatcher	Tyler Chen	Eugene McDermott	November 23, 2018	BW447
It's night shift in the E.R. as Wallow trains for his nursing credential. But when chaos erupts, he must swap bedpans for scalpels and learn the hard truths about Registered Nursing.
78	48	"War Without Tears"	Adrian Thatcher	Ryan North	Rodney King	November 23, 2018	BW448
The Bravest Warriors discover their reality is actually a 'video game' designed to entertain Higher Beings. Lacking free will, they quickly find themselves locked in a competition to the actual death with no power to resist.
79	49	"Out of Reach, Not Good Enough"	Adrian Thatcher	Kelsey Calaitges	Cilbur Rocha	November 30, 2018	BW449
It's Plum's CURVE-VA-VERSARY, the day celebrating Plum growing legit lady bumps. But when Chris's thoughtfully planned, yet cheaply executed, party doesn't live up to her expectations, she donks herself into a series of tantrums, reliving the most lavishly decked out day of all time.
80	50	"Won't You Please Take Me Home"	Adrian Thatcher	Natasha Hodgson	Jason Armstrong	November 30, 2018	BW450
When the Bravest Warriors answer a distress call from a humanoid planet overrun by an evil mech race, they have no idea how their own smooshy secrets will come into play - or who they should be fighting for in the first place.
81	51	"No Matter What the Future Brings - Part 1"	Adrian Thatcher	Joey Comeau & Benjamin Townsend	Ted Collyer	December 24, 2018	BW451
The Bravest Warriors journey to the See-Thru Zone to finally rescue their parents. But do the Courageous Battlers even want to be rescued?
82	52	"No Matter What the Future Brings - Part 2"	Adrian Thatcher	Joey Comeau & Benjamin Townsend	Eugene McDermott	December 24, 2018	BW452
With the Courageous Battlers happily trapped in the See-Thru Zone, the Bravest Warriors return to biz as usual, until they discover their parents' bliss may not be on their own volition.
