= Johnny the Homicidal Maniac =

Comic book by Jhonen Vasquez

- The cover of the first issue

Publication information
- Publisher: Slave Labor Graphics
- Schedule: Monthly
- Format: Limited series
- Genre: Dark comedy, satire, psychological horror, supernatural horror
- Publication date: August 1995 – January 1997
- No. of issues: 7
- Main character(s): Johnny C., Squee

Creative team
- Created by: Jhonen Vasquez
- Written by: Jhonen Vasquez
- Artist: Jhonen Vasquez
- Editor: Jennifer de Guzman

Johnny the Homicidal Maniac (often abbreviated JtHM) is the first comic book by Jhonen Vasquez. The series tells the story of a young man named Johnny "Nny" C. as he explores the psychological and possibly supernatural forces which compel him to commit a string of murders. JtHM began as a comic strip in the 1990s, then ran under alternative comics publisher Slave Labor Graphics as a limited series of seven issues, later collected in the trade paperback Johnny the Homicidal Maniac: Director's Cut. The series produced three spin-offs: Squee!, I Feel Sick, and Fillerbunny.

== Creation ==
Vasquez started drawing in kindergarten. He attended Mount Pleasant High School, where he took a part in a contest to design the cardinal as a school's mascot. Vasquez submitted an entry, but the judges rejected it. On the back of a preliminary drawing for the contest, he drew his first sketch of the character he would later name Johnny C. Vasquez's high school's student newspaper published a number of comic strips titled Johnny the Little Homicidal Maniac. Vasquez says the character originated as a personal avatar who could carry out his own revenge fantasies. Comic book artist and filmmaker Rob Schrab makes the same observation. However, Vasquez later distanced himself from the character, saying that Johnny should not be mistaken for an author surrogate. Vasquez also created Happy Noodle Boy while attending Mount Pleasant as a way to stop his girlfriend from asking him to draw comics for her.

In the early 1990s, Carpe Noctem, a magazine about the goth subculture, published several one-page strips featuring Johnny, now called Johnny the Homicidal Maniac. Though he never planned to create comic books, Vasquez submitted samples of his artwork to alternative comics publisher Slave Labor Graphics. Between August 1995 and January 1997, the publisher released a series of seven full-length issues based on the character. Vasquez describes the production process for Johnny as a "mess" and a "spew". As Vasquez worked on the comic, he prepared less and less, foregoing outlines and sketches and writing dialogue as he inked. Vasquez wishes that he had taken more time to plan the series, and feels that the quality of the dialogue suffered from his haphazard approach.

A photograph of one of Vasquez's friends, Leah England, serves as the middle of a portrait collection on the cover of the second issue of Johnny the Homicidal Maniac. England also gave Vasquez the inspiration for a filler strip about a child who was dangerously afraid of losing sight of his mother, as well as the "Meanwhile..." strip in the second issue. The two were discussing an event that had happened to a cheerleader, and thinking up the worst excuse possible.

Vasquez based Psychodoughboy and Mr. Eff on two real Styrofoam Pillsbury Doughboy display figures that he found and painted. He created Nailbunny as he was drawing the first page on which the character appears. Vasquez modeled for himself while drawing the characters.

Vasquez intended a tapeworm named Scolex to be one of Johnny's voices, but the character never made it into the finished series. Vasquez now uses Chancre Scolex as a pen name for Everything Can Be Beaten and his LiveJournal.

Like many alternative comics, and other Slave Labor Graphics titles, Johnny is creator-owned. By September 1996, Vasquez announced in his introduction to the sixth issue of Johnny the Homicidal Maniac that he had reached sufficient success in his artistic career to be able to quit his day-job and devote himself full-time to his art.

As his comics moved from dedicated comic book shops into shopping malls, Vasquez bemoaned the attendant change in his audience. Vasquez created his own animated series, Invader Zim, and became uncomfortable with younger fans of Zim reading Johnny, because of the violence depicted.

== Director's Cut ==
The front cover of Johnny the Homicidal Maniac: Director's Cut trade paperback shows Happy Noodle Boy, Mr. Samsa and Nailbunny.

Johnny the Homicidal Maniac: Director's Cut, a trade paperback released by Slave Labor Graphics in July 1997, collected the series. Slave Labor also released a hardcover version of the collection. Rob Schrab provides a foreword. The trade paperback includes a "Gallery of Ancient Horrors" that features a few strips previously published in the Mount Pleasant High School newspaper and Carpe Noctem, as well as some strips previously unpublished, all with commentary by Vasquez. The paperback also introduces some new supplementary materials such as sketches, an issue-by-issue synopsis, character profiles, and a fictional interview with Vasquez, but leaves out many of the filler strips from the original series.

The cover of the trade paperback features the logo "Z?", meaning "question sleep". "Z?" appears frequently throughout Vasquez's work and Question Sleep is the name of his official website. "Z?" is a reference to insomnia, a condition from which several of his characters suffer.

== Spin-offs ==
Johnny the Homicidal Maniac spawned two spin-offs: a four-issue series titled Squee! and a double-shot titled I Feel Sick. The trade paperback release of Squee!, titled Squee's Wonderful Big Giant Book of Unspeakable Horrors, includes the filler strips left out of Director's Cut. Johnny makes cameo appearances at the end of Squee! and in the second issue of I Feel Sick. Vasquez also maintained a Twitter account from the perspective of Johnny; however, it has been suspended.

== Style ==
The comic is high-contrast black and white with stylized and geometric cartoon characters. Graphical perspective is often very loose. The panel borders are jagged, and certain strips have messages hidden in the complex designs of the borders. Many of the characters are thin nearly to the point of being stick figures. Several of the characters, including Johnny, wear T-shirts with expressive messages that change from panel to panel. Vasquez often breaks the fourth wall with side comments to talk about the book, its audience, or himself. The speech balloons change with the moods of the characters. For example, Johnny's word balloons grow thorns when he becomes angry.

== Main characters ==
=== Johnny "Nny" C. ===
Johnny the Homicidal Maniac.

The series focuses on Johnny C., a man who elaborately slaughters anyone who irritates him. He drains his victims of blood to paint over a wall in his house to prevent a monster from escaping. He is 5 feet 9 inches (175 cm) and 115 pounds (52 kg). He likes stars, the emotionless function of insects, watching people get abducted by aliens, Cherry "FizWiz", Cherry "Brain-Freezies", all kinds of movies, Fruity Pops, the Moon, little chubby babies, pop rocks and soda, and drawing Happy Noodle Boy. He dislikes humidity, sleep, the physical and mental need for anything, being abducted by aliens, people who've "GOTTA HAVE A SMOKE!", certain words (such as "wacky"), losing his mind, Satan's attitude and getting shot in the head (or just using a gun in general).

Minus a tongue-in-cheek passage describing Johnny's origins stemming from the murder of his parents by an "evil man", his backstory and life before the events of the comic are deliberately kept vague.

=== Todd "Squee" Casil ===
Todd Casil (known as "Squee" due to the noise that he makes when frightened) is a young boy who lives in the house next to Johnny. Neither of his parents care for him, especially his father, who works countless hours at a dead-end job and leads a miserable life after raising Squee. While his parents are not outright abusive or even neglectful, his mother is heavily implied to be a drug addict of some sort, and his father has no qualms blaming Squee for all of his own personal failures, a trait Johnny picked up on and seemingly detests – Johnny thus becomes a sort of "guardian" for Squee, offering to blind his father for revenge, and saving him from a child molester. Despite this, Squee seems to be the only main human character aside from Johnny who is aware of his crimes, and thus is deathly afraid of him. Squee's only friend is a small teddy bear named Shmee. Shmee tells Squee in a dream that he is a "trauma sponge"; all of his fears and nightmares are "contained" in Shmee. Squee is also friends with Satan's son, with whom he attends school. Squee has his own series called Squee!, which was later collected in the TPB Squee's Wonderful Big Giant Book of Unspeakable Horrors.

== Setting ==
The series is set in the mid-1990s in an unspecified, fictional city. Decaying urban streets, shadowed back alleys and filthy convenience stores serve as the series' backdrop. Crumbling and covered with litter and graffiti, everything is in a state of bleak decay, overlit by the neon signs of trashy consumer capitalism.

Johnny lives in a decrepit, single-story house with the street address 777. The house has an extensive labyrinth of tunnels underneath. Johnny uses the subterranean rooms as dungeons and torture chambers, as well as a storage place for corpses, though he also buries the remains of his victims. The tunnels also provide him with a network to various locations, such as his neighbor Squee's residence. Johnny perceives the layout of the house as constantly changing, though he does not state if this shifting is the result of the supernatural forces at work within the house or his own psychosis, though in a later issue, when two of his prisoners escape, it is revealed that the house is, in fact, a supernatural entity that does not obey the laws of physics. Johnny states that he found the house and moved in some time ago. He also constructed an unidentified flying object landing pad on the roof. Throughout the series, there is no case where the authorities or the police are looking for Johnny, and they seem unaware of his existence.

A later part of the story takes place in the afterlife. After accidentally shooting himself, Johnny journeys first to Heaven and then to Hell, and both turn out to have more in common with Earth than he expected.

== Synopsis ==
The story is told in vignettes that reflect Johnny's disjointed mental state. Vasquez leaves unexplained which events in the story are objective and which are subjective, and provides no backstory about Johnny's origins.

The series begins when a boy named Todd (later nicknamed Squee by Johnny, for the noises he makes when scared) wakes in the middle of the night to find Johnny in the bathroom of his family's new house. After a confrontation with Squee's teddy bear, Shmee, Johnny leaves, informing Squee that they are neighbors. Later, Johnny goes on a rampage with a spork in a "Taco Hell" restaurant, incited by an elderly patron referring to him as "wacky". Following the slaughter, Johnny watches its coverage on the news. Later, Johnny captures and kills a patient and calm man named Edgar Vargas after discussing about the philosophy of murder with him, as well as explaining his mysterious need to collect blood to paint a wall in his house, and later kills a beautiful woman after contemplating over their "internal ugliness". He goes on a date with Devi, a cashier, and has a mental breakdown where he attempts to stab and kill her when he gives into his fear of losing his happiness, but Devi brutally beats Johnny and escapes. Sometime afterward, he kills everyone in his least favorite coffee shop, and kills a convenience store clerk over the inability to purchase a slushee. Johnny realizes there may be a supernatural force preventing him from being brought to justice for his murders. He and the sentient floating head "Nailbunny" journey through the seemingly endless basement of his house and discuss the nature of Johnny's psychosis, realizing the various forces at play with his mind. Johnny alludes to the mysterious evil force kept behind a wall, which needs to be kept from escaping through continuously repainting the wall with the fresh blood of his victims, as the urges of Eff Boy, one of two Doughboys who are psychically empowered by the entity behind the wall, and who wishes to keep it from escaping so that it cannot reclaim him. This is contrasted by Psycho-Doughboy, who urges Johnny to kill himself so that the seal will break, releasing his "master" from behind the wall. While journeying through the underground of his home, Johnny kills a cockroach named Mr. Samsa (after Gregor Samsa, the main character of Franz Kafka's short story The Metamorphosis). Johnny also rigs a robotic arm and handgun to shoot him if he were to answer the phone if someone calls, further flaunting his belief in his own immortality. When Devi calls him on the advice of a friend (as seen in an earlier scene), Johnny answers out of curiosity and is shot in the head immediately after resolving not to kill himself. Around this time, a pair of his victims escape from the bloody wall as a formless monstrosity breaks free, and reality itself seems to be erased.

Eventually, Johnny's soul arrives in Heaven, where he meets St. Peter, who becomes physically ill with all that Johnny has done throughout his life. With him distracted, Johnny enters Heaven and meets a demon woman named Damned Elise, who gives Johnny a tour. Johnny starts a massive psychic battle when he discovers that the souls in Heaven are immortal and have mental powers which includes the ability to explode people's heads. Later on in the tour, Johnny is brought before God, who is a lazy, obese man sitting in a chair in a state of exhaustion. Johnny starts a tirade that ends with Elise sending him to Hell. Johnny meets Señor Diablo, who gives Johnny a tour of the underworld and reveals that Johnny is a "flusher" or "waste lock", a creature chosen to concentrate the spiritual byproducts generated by humans into a specific object or point in space, in this case the wall in Johnny's house. As Johnny died, the wall unleashed the built-up negative energy, in the process destroying the universe, which was then restored. Johnny instantly despises Hell as he interacts with the obsessively negative and selfish citizens, and is sent back to life by Señor Diablo. Later on Earth, Johnny is unsure if he really died or if he experienced some kind of hallucination, and he resolves to become emotionless in order to retain his control over himself. When a copycat killer named "Jimmy" pays Johnny a visit and confesses to several murders and a rape, Johnny eviscerates him out of pure disgust. Afterward, Johnny visits Squee and tells him that he should look out for himself, otherwise he may become as mentally damaged as Johnny himself. The series ends with Johnny sitting on a cliff overlooking the city, writing in his diary, with the hopes that he will be "as cold as the moonlight" that touches the diary's pages.

== Filler strips ==
Johnny the Homicidal Maniac features several filler strips, which, for the most part, have nothing to do with the main storyline. Johnny the Homicidal Maniac: Director's Cut collects "Happy Noodle Boy", "Public Service Announcement", and "Anne Gwish", while Squee's Wonderful Big Giant Book of Unspeakable Horrors includes "Wobbly-Headed Bob", "Meanwhile...", and "True Tales of Human Drama".

=== Happy Noodle Boy ===
There is also a comic within a comic in the form of "Happy Noodle Boy", written and drawn by Johnny himself.

=== Public Service Announcement ===
In a few issues, there are "Public Service Announcement" strips that parody television public service announcements on topics such as teen pregnancy and substance abuse.

=== Anne Gwish ===
Anne Gwish is a young goth woman that has her own strip in the later part of the series. Her name is a pun on the word "anguish". Her storyline is completely unrelated to Johnny's, though she lives in the same fictional universe. The strips featuring her are largely a satire on the goth subculture.

=== Wobbly-Headed Bob ===
Wobbly-Headed Bob resolves to commit suicide.

Wobbly-Headed Bob lives in a separate fictional universe from the main storyline, one inhabited by anthropomorphic animals who, with the exception of Bob, live in a state of innocence and bliss. In contrast, Bob is a megalomaniac who believes himself to be the most intelligent person in the world, and the only one who understands the true nature of reality, which he sees in entirely pessimistic terms. His extreme negativity leaves him isolated and depressed. He overwhelms anyone he meets with his despair and often causes them to either commit suicide or flee from him in horror.

=== Meanwhile... ===
In one "Meanwhile..." strip, a group of piñatas come to life to exact revenge on a girl whose birthday party claimed one of their own. In another, two ancient gods of war possess a pair of grade school crossing guards to reenact an epic battle. In yet another, a naïve goth teenager, a character who also appears in I Feel Sick, dreams of becoming a sexy vampire like those found in The Vampire Chronicles, but transforms instead into a vampire more like Count Orlok. In one of the more infamous "Meanwhile..." strips, a nervous man on a date with Devi D. tries to conceal his explosive diarrhea. In an act of self-insertion, Jhonen Vasquez himself appears in other "Meanwhile..." strips.

=== True Tales of Human Drama ===
The strips titled "True Tales of Human Drama" tell stories about things such as a baby exploding, a plane crashing into a bus full of boy scouts, and a man blowing something out of his nose so horrible that a priest commands him to jump off a building.

== Reception ==
On 5 April 2008, Wizard placed the third issue of Johnny the Homicidal Maniac at number 151 in its rundown of the 200 greatest comics since the magazine started in July 1991.

== Merchandise ==
Over the years, Slave Labor Graphics has sold Johnny the Homicidal Maniac merchandise such as clothing, posters, and toys. Slave Labor released a Spooky squeeze toy, first shown in Johnny the Homicidal Maniac #4, as part of its promotion for I Feel Sick. Several years ago, a mug based on the design of the wall monster with the Question Sleep logo was under development.
