= Bloody Fun Day =

2009 video game

- Developer: Urban Squall
- Publisher: Kongregate
- Release: March 12, 2009
- Genre: Puzzle
- Mode: Single player

Bloody Fun Day is a puzzle Flash game developed by Urban Squall and published by Kongregate on March 12, 2009. Players control one of a family of three grim reapers and are tasked with moving around an island of hexagonal tiles, killing creatures called Cuties in order to replenish their own life force. Cuties come in four colors. Only the red ones restore life; the others charge special abilities that give the player more ways to kill further Cuties.

The game was initially developed as a demo by Urban Squall during the group's annual development meeting, in a San Diego hotel during November 2008. The demo was further tested after the five-day meeting, resulting in the complete game being released during March. The game's theme was inspired by the short story Everything Can Be Beaten by Jhonen Vasquez, which features a monster that clubs animals to death and is unable to interact with them in any other way.

Critics praised the game's concept, gameplay and addictiveness. The intensity of trying to keep the reaper alive was highlighted by some reviewers, such as saving the reaper's life by killing many Cuties. Some issues, such as the lack of special effects and enemies, were highlighted; this did not prevent reviewers from rating the game positively overall.

== Gameplay ==
The game is turn-based, with players selecting one of a family of three grim reapers as their player character and starting the tutorial or selecting a game mode from either "5 Level Mode" or "Unlimited Mode". Players are presented with an island consisting of hexagonal tiles, each occupied by a cutie, with their chosen reaper present in the middle of the board armed with a scythe. The objective of the game is to earn the highest score possible, by killing Cuties, before dying.

The mother grim reaper preparing to attack a group of black Cuties

Cuties come in four colors: Red, Black, Blue and Gold. When defeated, a Cutie releases a soul of the same color, which is added to the player's stock. Red Cuties' souls replenish the player's life gauge. The other three colors fill one or more of six special move buttons, allowing the player to use different attacks when the buttons are filled. When a new game is started, the player begins with 15 life points, one of which is expended each time the player moves to an adjoining tile. If the player's life points are depleted then their reaper dies, the player must slay as many red Cuties as possible to continue playing. In "5 Level Mode" play ends after the player completes the fifth level, in "Unlimited Mode" play continues until the player runs out of life energy.

When a player moves to a tile occupied by a Cutie, that creature is slain along with any other Cuties of the same color directly connected to that tile. Chains of Cuties can be slain in this fashion, producing several souls. Each tile the player moves to is drained of life, causing the grass to wither and preventing the player from moving back to it, any Cuties destroyed in a chain outside of the initial tile become eggs. After a set period of turns the eggs hatch into random Cuties, which can again be harvested for souls. Any tiles drained by the player's presence return to life and are furnished with an egg when existing eggs hatch. The result of this is that every tile the reaper travels on takes twice as long to spawn a new Cutie compared to tiles that housed a Cutie destroyed by a chain attack. Players move to the next game level after a certain number of moves, every new level increases the time taken for eggs to hatch by a turn. Moving onto a tile containing an egg destroys the egg and incurs a small point deduction, but destroying a golden egg increases the player's score. A golden egg is produced whenever 10 or more Cuties are killed in a chain.

The left side of the game screen features a turn tracker, which consists of a number of notches that represent turns. Markers are placed beside events such as level waypoints, egg hatching events, and the turn that ends the game if the player can't harvest more red souls. The 6 special abilities the player can charge with souls include the ability to kill any group of Cuties on the board, convert any adjacent group into red souls, and double the number of souls obtained from any adjacent Cutie group.

== Development ==
Initial development began in November 2008 when Urban Squall met in San Diego for their annual meeting, 2008's theme was 'a game in a week'. The team consisted of designer and programmer Andrew Pellerano, programmer Panayoti Haritatos, graphic designer Tim Wendorf and musician Nick Esposito. The developers hired two adjoining hotel rooms and opened the connecting door, allowing them to concentrate solely on creating the game over a period of five days, resulting in a demo. Pellerano spent further weeks updating the game during his spare time after which it was released to the public. During the weeks between the initial demo version and the game's release, Wendorf playtested the game and provided feedback on the number of souls needed to allow special abilities to be activated. The music track was created one night when Pellerano met Esposito in the latter's studio, during which Pellerano also voiced the sound effects resulting from Cuties being killed.

Bloody Fun Day's theme was inspired by the short story Everything Can Be Beaten by Jhonen Vasquez. The story centres on a monster called It, who spends his life in the confines of a single room, waiting in front of a chute that kittens slide down. He crushes the kittens with a hammer. One day It decides to leave the room, and encounters a world full of 'cute' animals. It responds by crushing the creatures, the only thing he is capable of doing.

== Reception ==
Bloody Fun Day received a positive response from video game critics. Psychotronic, reviewer for Jay is Games, called it "an exceptionally well-crafted and deep game" and "refreshingly original", saying the developer "gets more interesting with every new title". Kotaku Australia's David Wildgoose stated the game is "rather addictive". Vue Weekly writer Darren Zenko stated that the game is addictive, finding himself playing for more than 8 hours in a day. Psychotronic disliked the lack of variety in levels, due to only one island shape being available and no enemies being present. He also highlighted the lack of special effects when using the reapers' abilities, since Cuties all die using the same animation regardless of whether they are killed with a reaper's scythe or a special ability. Despite this, Psychotronic praised the game's special abilities in terms of balance and interest, stating that the "three different families of powers support each other, making it feel like your efforts in one area can always be redirected to another."

Wired writer Nate Ralph found that "Bloody Fun Day might not feature a deep or even logical narrative, but it's got style in spades, bolstered by simple, fun game mechanics." He added that the increased number of turns needed to hatch eggs "can lead to some delightfully irritating close shaves." IndieGames.com writer Michael Rose agreed, stating "The game mechanics work really well and it's a very nice concept." Anthony Carboni, a former co-host of Attack of the Show! and current presenter of online video game review show Bytejacker, was also positive. In his review he said "It's a lot of fun and easy to pick up, but as levels progress things do get pretty intense." Zenko stated the game embodied three virtues; "simple, hot and deep". These virtues were required in games published by Electronic Arts, which had been outlined to Zenko in a letter from Electronic Arts' founder Trip Hawkins after Zenko had written to Hawkins as a teenager. During play Zenko's reaper almost died due to a lack of red souls, but he managed to reverse the situation and fill the life bar; "even after all these years of gaming, that rush still does its neurochemical work".
