= Squeal =

Squeal may refer to:

- A term for providing privileged information about a person or an agency, usually performed by an informant
- "Squeal" (song), song by No Doubt
- Brake squeal, sound created by a disc brake
- Rail squeal, sound created by a train braking on a railroad track

== See also ==
- Squealer (disambiguation)
- Squee (disambiguation)
