= List of Johnny the Homicidal Maniac characters =

This is a list of characters of Johnny the Homicidal Maniac, a comic book by Jhonen Vasquez.

== Human characters ==
=== Johnny "Nny" C. ===
Johnny the Homicidal Maniac.

The series focuses on the self-titled "villain" Johnny C., also known as Nny (pronounced "knee"). He is a crazy and psychopathic serial killer, mass murderer and spree killer, who interacts with other characters, more often than not torturing and murdering them. He elaborately and sadistically kills anyone who even slightly irritates him, then drains their blood and paints one of the walls in his house with it (to keep a monster from getting out). If the situation dictates, Johnny is willing to murder "innocent" people, though in his twisted mind, he typically manages to justify his acts. The number of Johnny's victims is in the hundreds—or perhaps even thousands. Authorities are unable to capture Johnny and seem unaware of his existence, though his crimes are often witnessed in public and reported by the few who manage to survive. Nny acknowledges this fact, and it appears that the supernatural forces at work in his life prevent his being captured or killed.

He is often devoid of a conscience, and acknowledges that he is insane. This insanity manifests itself in three entities: Nailbunny, who is the closest thing to a conscience that Nny possesses; and Psychodoughboy and Mr. Eff, two styrofoam Pillsbury doughboys who argue over whether Nny should kill himself or simply continue to kill others.

Sometimes, Johnny displays feelings of self-hatred for his actions. This shows in his many monologues and suicide attempts. He even has what appear to be moments of clarity, but these are short-lived, and quickly turn into yet more crazed rants accompanied by bloodshed.

At the end of the comic, Johnny attempts to reform himself by abandoning his emotions in favor of cold intellect, going on what is referred to as a "vacation". This open-ended conclusion leaves room for a second series of comics, but the creator has expressed no interest so far to continue Nny's story. In the final issue of Squee!, it is revealed that following the events of JtHM, Nny spent some time at a mental hospital, as a participant in a sleep study, but subsequently left the hospital despite researchers' enthusiasm for analyzing his "dreams".

Though his exact age is unknown, Vasquez has been quoted saying Johnny is in his early twenties. According to the Director's Cut, he is 5' 9" and 115 lbs, making him very underweight.

In JtHM: The Director's Cut, it is said that Johnny's parents were murdered by an "evil man", but this is an obvious joke, as the description goes on to say that, after this traumatic event, Nny became a masked crime fighter. Throughout the series, no information is given about Johnny's family or of his past, and even Johnny is deprived of all but occasional flashes of memory. A running theory on Johnny's origin is that he was once a brilliant artist who lost his talent, and subsequently went insane. This theory is supported by Devi's recollection in issue 2 of I Feel Sick of a conversation between herself and Johnny, in which Johnny laments his loss of painting talent and implies that he began to kill as a way of filling that void. In issue 4 of JtHM, Nailbunny chastises Johnny for drawing his Happy Noodle Boy comic instead of painting. However, Vasquez has written that he did not intend to give Johnny a concrete origin story, stating, "[I] find the blurriness of it all much more appealing than making him go nuts over being pantsed in school once. 'YAAAARGH!! I have been pantsed!! I kill like the damned now!!' That's just not done."

After the comic was released, Vasquez set up a Twitter page for Johnny, where he put out random comments that he makes, often about what he does while he's killing people, or just simply ideas. That account is now suspended.

=== Todd "Squee" Casil ===
Also known as Todd Casil, but nicknamed Squee, the namesake originating from the sound the child makes when scared. He is Johnny's friend and next-door neighbor. Squee's mother is implied to suffer from a vague drug addiction, and his father resents his very existence and has no qualms about constantly telling him so. Squee has a teddy bear named Shmee, who is conscious in Todd's own psyche; Shmee happens to be a trauma sponge, and constantly tells Squee to do evil things. Vasquez later authored a comic series, Squee!, with this character as the protagonist. Johnny is the only person who really cares about Squee, serving as his least evil friend, though he constantly frightens him unintentionally. Johnny has hinted from time to time that his interest in Squee is partially due to his desire to ensure that Squee doesn't grow up to be like him. Also, Johnny has actively taken measures to ensure the safety of Squee, by killing and mutilating a pedophile poised to abduct Squee.

A sad, lonely, and mistreated little boy at about 6 or 7 years old, Squee is frightened by almost everything, and is terrified of his evidently disturbed neighbor. Despite this however, Johnny takes a shine to Squee, seeing him as something of a little brother from the family he never had (or simply cannot remember). On several occasions Johnny talks to Squee about his opinions on humanity and the various tribulations of life, usually ending in Squee being horrified by the 'examples' Johnny uses in order to get his point across. Squee's father despises him and wishes that he was never born. Squee's mother is often so doped on various pills that she doesn't recognize Squee or is unaware of what is happening around her. Their detachment from their son also prevents them from noticing the numerous occasions in which Johnny breaks into the house. Squee's other only true friend is a teddy bear named Shmee. At one point he meets and 'befriends' the son of the Devil, a boy named Pepito.

=== Devi D. ===
Nicknamed "The One That Got Away", Devi befriends Johnny and becomes a potential love interest, though she is unaware of his antisocial behavior until he attempts to murder her. A struggling artist, she works in a bookstore for half the duration of the comic; the other half is spent painting in her apartment. Devi was one of the few people who actually met Johnny in person and lived to tell about it. She's also the only person (besides Squee) Johnny has ever truly felt any positive feelings for. They met in the bookstore she once worked in before she became a professional artist, and went on a date that ended in almost being able to kiss, but instead, Johnny felt so happy that he wanted to "immortalize the moment" and attacked Devi. Instead, she beat him up and fled. Ever since, he has been occasionally trying to contact her to apologize and try and explain his odd reasons for trying to kill her, in which she responds to by locking herself in her apartment and screaming at him over the phone. Johnny seems to show selflessness toward her by trying to become cold so he has a lesser chance of killing her.

Devi was later the subject of the doubleshot comic I Feel Sick, in which she struggles to maintain her own sanity. She converses with a painting of a doll named Sickness, and the ensuing power struggle hints at the possibility of the dark supernatural forces that were Johnny's undoing.

=== Tess R., Dillon and Krik ===
Tess R. and Dillon are two people who play part of the goth parody in the series. Krik is a violent misogynist (he claims to have beaten his girlfriend and her grandmother) and chauvinist who is abducted by Johnny for drunkenly harassing him. Apparently, Johnny removed a chunk of his brain from the back of his head, making him nearly lose sanity. Tess' family moved around a lot so she has a hard time making friends. She is a pseudo-goth in order to make friends with others. She dates Dillon because he's in a band. Dillon uses the goth culture as a means of excluding and ridiculing others. They come into Johnny's grasp due to Dillon's constant badgering during Kafka: Johnny makes a point of ignoring Tess and tormenting Dillon, who is unaware of the fact that Tess dislikes him. After Johnny's accidental "death", Tess and Krik try to escape, but are slowed down by running into other prisoners in the dungeons and encountering the doughboys. Although Krik (who released Tess from Johnny's captivity) and Dillon were quite literally torn apart, Tess presumably escaped—although at this point there appeared to have been no universe into which to escape. She was not actually killed but was "flushed" with the rest of reality: she survived once the universe was "reloaded". Anne Gwish (see below) makes a reference to her being just out-of-frame later in the series. In Invader Zim, Jhonen Vasquez's later television series, the episode "Game Slave 2" features a Battery Clerk bearing a striking resemblance to Tess, but whether or not it is her is unknown.

=== Edgar Vargas ===
Edgar Vargas is a man who is abducted and killed by Johnny early in the series. During the single short storyline in which he appears, Edgar appears strapped into one of Nny's basement torture devices. Despite his predicament, he states that he is not afraid of Johnny's threats to kill him, because according to his religion, he will go to heaven, while Nny will be punished for his crimes in hell. Nny appears to contemplate this, and even seems to enjoy talking with Edgar, referring to him as his "bestest, bestest friend in the room, currently." Nevertheless, Johnny ultimately ignores any "lesson" his meeting with Edgar may have been intended to impart, and kills him anyway. However, Nny explicitly states that this is not done out of anger or hatred, but out of a necessity to "feed" Edgar's blood to the wall monster that controls Nny. This is the first instance in the book where it is indicated that the wall has become a key reason behind Johnny's violent actions. It is also an instance in which Johnny shows some degree of remorse, or at least a lack of enjoyment in, killing someone, as he says, after the murder is complete, "Well, that did nothing for me."

=== Anne Gwish ===
Anne Gwish is a goth woman who is featured in her own page-long comics in later issues of JtHM. These strips are unrelated to the main storyline, though Anne lives in the same fictional universe as Johnny and the other characters. The strips featuring her are largely a satire on stereotypical goth culture's tendencies towards pretension and exaggeration by individuals of their personal suffering.

Within the Anne Gwish strips, there are several puns and parodies on gothic subculture found in the backgrounds, including posters for "Johnny the Hamicidal Maniac" (depicting Johnny as a pig), "Ditchspade Symphony" (a parody of the band Switchblade Symphony), "The Shmoe" (a rather obvious parody of The Crow), "Nine Inch Heels" (parody of Nine Inch Nails), and "The Dirtman" (referencing the comic The Sandman).

In the back of JtHM: Director's Cut, it was revealed that Vasquez liked the idea of Anne Gwish being the "most physically attractive" of his characters, as it "only frames more distinctly how HORRIBLE a person she is inside".

=== Jimmy ===
Jimmy appears in the final issue of the comic, following Johnny's death and rebirth. Calling himself by the self-given nicknames "Mmy" and "Darkness", he appears on Johnny's doorstep and introduces himself as Nny's fan and devotee. Jimmy has a strikingly similar appearance to Johnny, much of which, it is implied, is an affectation intended to emulate the title character: he sports Nny's original haircut, skinny body, and very similar clothes. It seems that he is younger than Nny. He is the only known person successful in tracking down Johnny's home of his own volition. That this occurs following the "reboot" of the universe after Nny's death may be an indication that Nny's supernatural help in avoiding detection by normal people has weakened or been removed completely by this point.

Jimmy informs Johnny that his interest in the latter's "work" began when he witnessed the destruction of a "Taco Hell" outlet by Johnny from a "CD Cesspool" store across the street. At that point, he decided to mimic Johnny's actions, to the extent of assembling a suitcase full of blades and surgical equipment. He gleefully recounts to Nny the murders he has committed to date – his first grade teacher and a girl who resembled someone who bullied him in high school. He also admits, with relish, that he raped his second victim in an alley behind a mall before killing her (this incident was referred to earlier in the series and blamed on Johnny). As Nny grows visibly more and more disgusted with Jimmy's presence, Jimmy indicates that he would like to team up with Johnny and continue their mutual killing spree.

However, Jimmy's attempts at mimicking Johnny are an abomination in Nny's eyes, though Nny acknowledges that Jimmy's sociopathy "is a more reasonable facsimile of [Johnny's] own work than [Johnny would] like to admit". Despite being given several chances to simply leave, Jimmy persists, and Nny proceeds to kill him.

During the torture that follows, Johnny makes particular reference to the rape of the girl, which he finds unforgivable, stating that he himself would never do such a thing, as he considers even basic physical contact with people to be distasteful, and that he considers such an act to be giving in to emotion, something else which he also finds abhorrent. He also speaks at length on the subject of his distaste at being imitated at all. As Johnny is speaking, Jimmy is vivisected with several hooks, opening his torso. Johnny replies to Jimmy's final statement that he is "just like" Nny by smashing a sledgehammer into Jimmy's open chest cavity and stating, "I don't like myself much."

It is generally assumed that Jimmy represents a particular breed of JtHM fans that seek to emulate Johnny, Vasquez's style, and/or even Vasquez himself, as Nny is depicted as being particularly distressed at the fact that Jimmy's mimicry may be more accurate than he would prefer to believe. The idea that Jimmy may be a parody of a portion of JtHM's fanbase is also indicated by the facts that Jimmy's speech and mannerisms are like that of a stereotypical teenager, and that he doesn't seem to understand the little bit of underlying reason behind Johnny's acts of murder. At one point, Jimmy suggests that "[Johnny] should kill more, and talk less", which may refer to fan reactions to Johnny's monologues and existential angst in later installments of the series.

== Johnny's "Voices" ==
=== Nailbunny ===
Also known as Spooky Floating Bunny Head, Nailbunny was Johnny's first and last pet, a rabbit whom he fed once and then nailed to a wall. Only the preserved head (which was torn from the body by Mr. Eff) remains by the end of the comic, the rest of the body apparently unnecessary for the afterlife. It is unclear whether the disembodied head of Nailbunny was actually given the ability to levitate by the supernatural force that permeates Nny's house, or that Johnny is simply hallucinating during his interactions with the dead rabbit.

Among the group of Johnny's "voices," Nailbunny appears to represent Nny's conscience and "voice of reason," a role he on occasion expresses exasperation with. He is responsible for persuading Johnny not to kill himself, and also acts as a conversation partner during some of Nny's more introspective moments regarding his life and killing sprees. After Johnny dies and is subsequently returned to the newly rebooted universe, Nailbunny no longer appears, although on at least one occasion it is suggested that Nny still hears his voice.

=== The Doughboys ===
Based on the mascots for a certain company (Pillsbury) that produces muffins, "Psycho-Doughboy" (aka "D-Boy") and "Mr. Eff" are carved foam figures that were once part of a pastry display. After being taken home and repainted by Johnny, they were given personalities through supernatural means, and throughout the story appear to represent opposing "sides" of Nny's insanity. Later on, it is also revealed that the two are affiliated with the monster behind Johnny's blood-painted wall: D-Boy refers to the creature as his "Master" and expresses a wish to be reabsorbed into this master, while Mr. Eff seems to have relinquished his devotion to it, and would prefer to become a "real" entity in his own right.

In his role as one of Johnny's "headvoices," Mr. Eff appears to represent Nny's more manic, homicidal side, as he encourages Nny to kill remorselessly to obtain blood to repaint the wall. However, this action also has a selfish motive, since as long as the monster remains inside the wall, it will feed more power to Mr. Eff and Psycho-Doughboy, making them more real. Psycho-Doughboy, on the other hand, represents the depressed, self-loathing aspect of Nny's insanity, encourages Nny to kill himself on several occasions. D-boy is continually infuriated with Nny's inability to kill himself, and accuses him of sabotaging his attempts on purpose.

Eventually, the Doughboys become more than just extensions of Johnny's insanity, but rather mortal, mobile creatures in their own right, as they interact with Tess and Kirk in Issue 5. Shortly after this, the wall monster kills them both.

=== Reverend Meat ===
Continuing the series' trend of inanimate objects imbued with personalities, Reverend Meat is a Bub's Burger Boy statuette who begins speaking to Johnny after his rebirth. He represents the desire for instant gratification and physical sensation, and encourages Johnny to give into his every urge and desire without thinking. This perspective stands in stark contrast with Nny's decision, post-death, to "cleanse" himself of all emotion and desire; Johnny dislikes and argues with Reverend Meat, and tends to ignore him in favor of Mr. Samsa the cockroach.

Reverend Meat claims that he is not like the Doughboys (whom he characterizes as "mere manifestations of a manifestation"), and offers as proof of this statement the fact that he's holding up a giant hamburger. Reverend Meat's name is not mentioned in the comic itself, but Jhonen Vasquez provided it in an interview, and listed it in the JTHM: Director's Cut.

== Heaven and Hell ==
=== St. Peter ===
Works the reception desk in Heaven. He becomes violently ill when he looks up the horrible acts Nny has done. He has sunglasses, dreadlocks, a small curled beard connected to his moustache, and a T-shirt that reads "GOD™". The sign that states "Administration" also has in smaller letters under it "We sell churros too".

=== God ===
God is here depicted as a giant baby-like man living in Heaven that gives Johnny no help. God openly admits to having done nothing since the creation of the universe just before going back to sleep. He created the universe, and is now very tired. Vasquez thinks he is cute, according to an author's note.

=== Damned Elize ===
Damned Elize is a character who lives in Hell. She does menial tasks in Heaven as punishment for her hedonism in life. She seems to be attracted to Johnny based on an offhand remark about tearing his clothes off with her teeth, which rather repels him. However, just before being sent to Hell, she remarks also in a rant of sorts that she is in so much trouble because of him due to the psychic battle he started in Heaven, and wants him to go away. She also comments that she'll probably get stuck working the giant Taco Bell in Heaven.

=== Señor Diablo ===
In Jhonen Vasquez's works, Señor Diablo is Satan, Señor Diablo being his preferred name. Standing at something like eight feet tall, with humongous, ram-like horns and an unhappy-face pin, he looks positively demonic. Johnny, after being dropped out of Heaven with some unanswered questions, asks Señor Diablo about his true nature on Earth, learning that he is in fact a "waste-lock", someone who holds back the vile psychic residue that humans generate on Earth.

A relatively sardonic and sarcastic version of the Devil, remarkably akin to Mark Twain's Satan (Letters from the Earth), Señor Diablo is really quite amused by humankind's desire to constantly look good. He finds Nny's unhappy fate rather hilarious, given that he was obviously disturbed enough to begin with. He lives in the same city as Squee with his Christian wife (who knows him as "Juan" and is unaware of who he truly is until he finally bothers to tell her) and Antichrist son, Pepito (who considers himself to be friends with Nny's neighbor Squee). He makes another appearance in Vasquez's other work, Squee!, as the father of the aforementioned Pepito.

Señor Diablo is the name given to the Devil in the JtHM comic. Señor Diablo represents Johnny's understanding of evil. This understanding includes lack of caring for other people and how they feel about life. In the JtHM hell, Johnny sees a perfect example of a world of torture and pain which is a replication of the world that already exists (only now without the few good people that made things better, and an inability to die).

== Other ==
=== The Wall Monster ===
At one point in the series, Johnny is unable to paint the wall because of an accidentally self-inflicted gunshot wound. This, and his approaching death, is what causes the monster to break free. This is why one of the doughboys wants Nny to kill himself; their "master" behind the wall needed Johnny dead in order to liberate it, while the other doughboy wants to keep their master imprisoned so they can be free. The monster breaks free and it goes on a rampage through Johnny's house, killing many of the victims imprisoned there. Presumably it is the animated cesspool of human negative emotional residue the devil spoke of in his monologue. Fans have named this creature "Moose" because of a caption in volume 5 that reads "Fun Fact: It's not a moose". Also, in a strip in volume 2, Johnny is wearing a shirt that reads: "777 # of the Moose". Johnny lives in house #777. Krik, one of Nny's numerous captives, exclaims that he thought the noises in the wall was a "moose".

The Wall Monster could also be seen as a nod towards famous horror writer H. P. Lovecraft, due to the fact that the wall monster has no definite shape and seems to be mostly defined by tentacles (similar to some inter-dimensional monsters in Lovecraft stories). Krik also mentions that the noises preceding the monster's appearance make him think there were "rats in the walls", which is the name of a famous short story by H. P. Lovecraft.

The first reference to the wall was in the second "scene" in the first volume, where a surveyor comes to Johnny's house asking questions, one being about a girl found drained of her blood behind a mall, then implies that the blood was consumed, to which Johnny replies "I never drank her blood!! You see!! It changes color when it dries!" (pointing to the wall) "It NEVER stays!! I have to keep the wall wet!!" just before killing him.

Invader Zim makes a subtle reference to the Wall Monster in the episode "A Room with a Moose", in which Zim sentences his classmates to suffer in a room which is inhabited by an actual moose. (The Wall-Moose connection is underscored by the fact that Dib isn't really afraid of the Moose until Zim feeds it some walnuts.)

=== Mr. Samsa ===
Named after the main character of Franz Kafka's short story "The Metamorphosis", "Mr. Samsa" is the name given by Nny to a series of normal cockroaches that live in his basement, which he believes to be a single immortal cockroach that he must repeatedly kill. To Johnny, Mr. Samsa represents complete desensitization and unemotional thinking, a state for which Johnny begins a quest at the end of the series. The insects are normal bugs with no ties to the supernatural entities in the series.

=== Happy Noodle Boy ===
Johnny is also the creator of a comic strip called Happy Noodle Boy.

Happy Noodle Boy is a stick figure character appearing in a comic drawn by Johnny and read mainly by "the homeless insane". Every issue has (at least) one single-page insert of the Happy Noodle Boy comic itself, detailing the often completely nonsensical adventures (mostly cursing, screaming, and being shot). Happy Noodle Boy spends much of his time standing on a wooden box and yelling nonsense at hapless pedestrians, often provoking his own death.

He appears in the backgrounds of many of the strips of the main storyline (the mall, the movie theatre, etc.), usually in crowd scenes, and pictures of him appear frequently in Squee's room. He also appeared in I Feel Sick #1 in a crowded dance floor. Johnny seems to be in the habit of leaving his drawings lying around.

It is believed that Happy Noodle Boy's name is a reference to Johnny's extraordinarily thin figure. In one particular comic, Johnny says that when he was young, other kids taunted him for this, calling him "Noodle Boy."

At one point it is mentioned that, while all Johnny can draw currently is Happy Noodle Boy, he used to be an artist of particular talent.

According to Jhonen Vasquez, he created Happy Noodle Boy while attending Mount Pleasant. According to Vasquez, "So many years ago, [my little romantical friend in high school] was the unwitting reason Happy Noodle Boy was created. [She] always asked me for comics. But I couldn't draw as fast as she requested. Thus, I tried to create the worst abomination of a comic that I could, so as to make her not want comics anymore. That abomination, my friends, was Happy Noodle Boy".

4 strips of Happy Noodle Boy appear in Squee's Wonderful Big Giant Book Of Unspeakable Horrors.

The face of Happy Noodle Boy appears on the covers of JTHM in place of the Slave Labour Graphics logo.

=== Wobbly-Headed Bob ===
Wobbly-Headed Bob appears in a one-page comic in each book of the series set in its own offbeat fictional universe. Bob himself is a rodent-like outcast with a comically oversized head that wobbles as he moves. He is convinced he's the ultimate being thanks to his immense intellect, whereas he is perpetually miserable, trapped by his own overthinking and inflated ego.

Each strip subverts the classic funny-animal setup. Bob appears as a cheerful, carefree character, but instead of joining in the light-hearted antics, Bob eagerly skewers them with his bleak, hyper-analytical worldview. The result is disproportionate despair, while Bob remains oblivious to the emotional wreckage he leaves behind.
