= Bravest Warriors =

American-Canadian animated web and television series

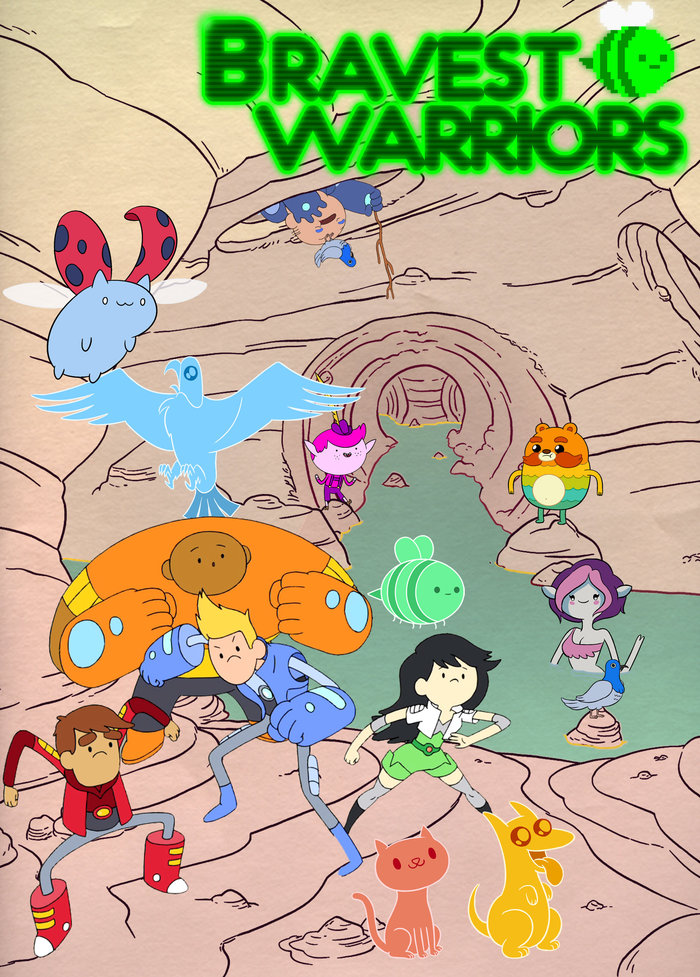
- Promotional poster
- Genre: Action adventure Science fiction Comedy drama
- Created by: Pendleton Ward
- Developed by: Breehn Burns; Will McRobb Chris Viscardi
- Directed by: Breehn Burns (seasons 1–2); Tom King (season 3); Adrian Thatcher (season 4)
- Voices of: Alex Walsh; Liliana Mumy; John Omohundro; Ian Jones-Quartey; Tara Strong; Sam Lavagnino; Eric Bauza
- Opening theme: "Bravest Warriors"
- Countries of origin: United States; Canada (season 4)
- Original language: English
- No. of seasons: 4
- No. of episodes: 82 (list of episodes)

Production
- Executive producers: Fred Seibert; Breehn Burns (seasons 1–3); Will McRobb (seasons 1–3); Chris Viscardi (seasons 1–3); Scott Dyer (season 4); Eric Homan (season 4); Kevin Kolde (season 4); Doug Murphy (season 4); Benjamin Townsend (season 4); Irene Weibel (season 4)
- Running time: 7 minutes (pilot); 4–7 minutes (seasons 1–2); 11 minutes (seasons 3–4)
- Production companies: Frederator Studios; Nelvana (season 4)

Original release
- Network: YouTube (seasons 1–2); VRV (seasons 3–4)
- Release: November 8, 2012 – December 24, 2018

Related
- Random! Cartoons

Bravest Warriors is an animated web series created by Pendleton Ward. Set in the year 3085 onwards, it follows four teenage heroes-for-hire as they warp through the universe to save adorable aliens and their worlds using the power of their emotions. The animated series began streaming on Frederator's Cartoon Hangover channel on YouTube on November 8, 2012. The series is based on a short produced for Frederator's Nicktoons animation incubator series Random! Cartoons that aired on January 10, 2009. A comic book adaptation published by Boom! Studios launched on October 24, 2012.

On October 20, 2016, a fourth season was announced. It was produced by Nelvana in Canada, in association with Frederator. It started airing on VRV in the United States on December 25, 2017, and Teletoon in Canada on September 3, 2018. A 21-minute documentary was released on December 11, 2017. As the voice acting for the television series was recorded between Los Angeles, California and Toronto, Ontario. While it is not the first show to be both a SAG-AFTRA and ACTRA production, it is the first North American animated production to credit both unions due to using more American voice actors over Canadian voice actors.

The show won the Shorty Award for Best Web Show in 2013 and was nominated in the Annecy International Animated Film Festival. It is also a 2015 Webby Award honoree. The fourth season was nominated for the 2019 Youth Media Alliance award for Best Digital First Content for all age groups. On December 3, 2019, it was announced that there would be a Catbug spin-off and Ward would be involved with it. However, as of November 2026, no updates have been announced.

== Characters ==
=== Main ===
- Christopher "Chris" Kirkman (voiced by Charlie Schlatter (pilot), Alex Walsh (web series), Graeme Jokic (TV series))

The 16-year-old leader of the Bravest Warriors. He has a crush on his best friend, Beth, which is a recurring theme in the series, and he has a fear of losing her. His sticker pet is a little bee which can form a sword with a honey-comb hilt and a swarm of bees.
Although Walsh did not reprise his role of Chris in season 4 of Bravest Warriors, he voices Zachary Ryan "Zack" Kirkson, Beth's boyfriend.

- Bethany "Beth" Tezuka (voiced by Tara Strong (pilot), Liliana Mumy (web series, TV series))

The emerging leader of the Bravest Warriors. Her sticker pet is a cat which can form into a cat o' nine tails with cat heads. In the episode "Hamster Priest" it's discovered that the dimension hopping machine of Beth's father, "Ralph Waldo Pickle Chips", is directly linked with Beth's brainwaves. It was eventually revealed in "Season of the Mitch" that Beth is the only one that can bear the Aeon Worm's offspring and the worm began to impregnate her before Danny managed to stop it. At the end of "Season of the Mitch", she becomes the new leader of the team in the wake of Chris' disappearance. It has not been confirmed yet whether or not Beth is now pregnant with Aeon Worm offspring, or if Danny saved her in time.

- Daniel "Danny" Vasquez (voiced by Rob Paulsen (pilot), John Omohundro (web series, TV Series))

The snarky member of the Bravest Warriors. His sticker pet is a dog which forms either a sword or gatling gun. He is also the team's inventor, his inventions include a time machine (which was destroyed by an alternate version of himself in "Dan Before Time") and Robo-Chris. Unlike the other members of the team who grew up in the Invisible Hideout, Danny was raised in the "martian badlands".
In season 4, as an in-joke, Rob Paulsen, the original voice of Danny voices New Danny in the episode Decide What You Want From Me.

- Wallow (voiced by Dan Finnerty (pilot), Ian Jones-Quartey (web series, TV series))

The offbeat member of the Bravest Warriors. His glove contains a computer A.I. named Pixel (voiced by Maria Bamford) who gets jealous easily. His sticker pet is a falcon that forms an axe. It can also form a bazooka and a guitar. He has a wide range of companions such as Impossibear and Catbug. In "Season of the Worm" he lost his left arm when Beth had to amputate it when it got covered in inter phasing hump gnats. From Seasons 3 to 4, Himmel Man-Cheese was his arm/lover.

- Plum (voiced by Tara Strong): First appeared in the comic book and was introduced along with Impossibear and Catbug in "Gas Powered Stick", is Beth's friend who is a Merewif, an amphibious alien who can merge her legs into a mermaid tail when in water, as revealed at the end of the episode. She can also assume a more monstrous form with fangs, glowing purple eyes and six tentacles. Plum is the unofficial fifth Bravest Warrior. She has an ancient and wise second personality that lives in her second brain. She seems to have a crush on Chris as seen in Gas Powered Stick when she flirts and kisses him, but that could have been a ruse in order to remove the peach pit that gave Chris X-ray vision. She is bisexual, as she has a crush on Chris, kissing him multiple times during the show, she is also madly in love with her doppelganger as shown in the comics and kisses Peach in another comic. Furthermore, on numerous occasions, she has identified as bisexual, confirmed by Kate Leth, one of the writers of the Bravest Warriors comic, writing "Plum is bi and it's canon and I'm proud of her."

=== Recurring ===
- Emotion Lord (voiced by Breehn Burns): A seemingly immortal human who has reality warping powers tied to his emotions. In "Lavarinth", he reveals himself to be Chris a from 184 years in the future, and that he needs Chris to start taking vitamin B12 supplements otherwise they will go bald. He had been missing since the episode "Ultra Wankershim" when he was 'forced' to put on the temporal pair 'o socks which appeared after he accidentally gave Chris dangerous foreknowledge of the future. He returns in "Parasox Pub" by possessing Catbug in order to transport Chris to the Parasox Pub, which is locked in a timeless prism for the Emotion Lord. Various stages of the Emotion Lord's life is revealed, and that he will live to be at least 3000 years old.
- The Concierge (voiced by Eric Bauza): A small grey-skinned, purple-haired creature in a suit that follows the Emotion Lord in his travels and takes record of everything he says and does. He first appeared in the episode "Emotion Lord" and was most recently seen in "Merewif Tag". He is supposedly invisible to all but the Emotion Lord, but was visible to Danny and Wallow in "Lavarinth" and Plum in "Merewif Tag". The concierge shares many character design elements with the character Peppermint Butler in Ward's other series Adventure Time, as both are always seen wearing a suit with a red bowtie and have pupiless white eyes. In season 4, it is revealed that Concierge is Chris and Plum's son from the future.
- Impossibear (voiced by Michael Leon Wooley): An unusual bear that first appeared in the comic, but was introduced along with Catbug and Plum in "Gas Powered Stick". Impossibear is the unofficial 7th Warrior, and the 3rd unofficial Warrior besides Catbug and Plum.
- Jelly Kid (voiced by Breehn Burns): A toast goblin with the ability to create a slice of white bread by making a "pshew" sound. Though Jelly Kid can't speak, he has a kind and simple personality and is beloved by the Bravest Warriors, particularly Danny. In "Jelly Kid Forever," he is stalked and killed by Catbug, who decapitates him and cheerfully announces that he "caught" the toast goblin as a present for Danny, and is presumed to be dead. At his funeral, a ship burial held by the Warriors, he reanimates, as he has healing abilities, and he sails off into the sunset.
- Catbug (voiced by Sam Lavagnino): An alien creature created in Johnny Tezuka's Dimension Garden, Catbug is friend and comrade to the Bravest Warriors. He is half-cat and half-ladybug and possesses the physical traits of both animals; he can often be seen stalking, like a cat, and he can fly, like a ladybug. In terms of his personality, Catbug is childlike and carefree, which sometimes interferes with his ability to complete a mission. He has the ability to teleport between the two dimensions, the real world and the See-Through Zone, though he cannot travel between the two at will, only at random. Catbug is the unofficial 6th Bravest Warrior, and the 2nd unofficial Warrior besides Plum.
- Johnny Tezuka / Ralph Waldo Pickle Chips (voiced by Bill Mumy): Johnny Tezuka was Beth's father and leader of the Courageous Battlers. He is short with black hair, and his brain is exposed through a clear dome on top of his head. Like the rest of his team, he was trapped in the see-through zone two years before the events of the series. At some point he was apparently eaten by the Aeon Worm and brainwashed to become one of its followers, thus transforming him into "The Reverend Ralph Waldo Pickle Chips." He soon begins rebuilding a following by brainwashing several hamsters. He finally summoned the Aeon Worm in "Season of the Mitch" by using his hamsters perfect faith to transform his sticker pet from a caribou into the Aeon Worm, but was stopped when the paralyzed horse appeared possessing Hamster Mitch and Danny cracked his brain dome.
- Paralyzed Horse (voiced by Victor Caroli): First appearing in the season 1 finale episode "Cat Bug," he is Beth's childhood pet. When Beth was 6 years old, he discovered the meaning of forever, granting him an unlimited knowledge of time and space. This infinite knowledge has left him in a constant state of shock, causing him to become permanently paralyzed. Being unable to move or speak he uses a dramatic internal monologue to chronicle his daily life. In "Aeon Worm," he journeys with Beth into the see-through zone, which gives him telekinetic powers which he can use to move and speak, as well as the ability to create psychic armor and shoot flames from his hooves. At the end of the episode, he chooses to remain in the see-through zone to fight the Aeon Worm and protect Beth as she escapes. His fate remained unknown until "Season of the Mitch," when he possesses the hamster Mitch during his crisis of faith to help fight the Aeon Worm in the real world. He is last seen at the end of the episode, continuing his fight against the Aeon Worm in the See-Through Zone.
- Wankershim (voiced by Breehn Burns): A holographic elf who exists as a program inside the Bravest Warriors "Holojohn". In "Ultra Wankershim" he becomes a fully organic life form after achieving self-awareness. However, soon after, he begins expanding uncontrollably, eventually growing so large that he becomes one with the universe. After this his body begins giving off "Wankergy", which in large abundances causes uncontrollable joy, and even has reality warping effects.
- Slippy Napkins (voiced by Polly Lou Livingston (pilot, seasons 1-3), Fiona Reid (season 4)): First appeared in the Random! Cartoons pilot. A member of an alien race who the Bravest Warriors save from a rogue planet. She possesses two legs and a single arm coming out of her head that her people soon learn to use in high-fives. Slippy Napkins returns as one of Wallow's alien pets and a member of Catbug's away team on Santee Major.
- Zachary Ryan "Zack" Kirkson (voiced by Alex Walsh): Beth's boyfriend who first appeared in season 4.
- Aeon Worm (voiced by Tony Todd): The main antagonist of season 2. Described by the Paralyzed Horse as a primordial goliath of the highest evolution. Using its mind control powers it demands that its followers worship it as a god with them often chanting "Never doubt the Worm". It was revealed in "Dimension Garden" that it was created in Ralph Waldo Pickles Chips' dimension garden. In "Season of the Mitch" Ralph Waldo Pickle Chips finally summons the worm but is defeated by Danny, the Paralyzed Horse, and Mitch.
- Karswell (voiced by Eric Bauza): the main antagonist of season 4. He is the Prince of Moop from the future, where he has killed all four Bravest warriors and used their vital organs to enhance himself: Beth's brain for remorseless logic, Chris's moop-infected heart as a power source, Wallow's lungs, and Danny's spleen. He reveals he infected Chris in the premiere to ensure his timeline. His fate is unknown as of the mid-season finale "Will Things Ever Be The Same Again?" when the Invisible Hideout self-destructs with them trapped inside.
- Mitch (voiced by Gedde Watanabe): One of the hamsters bred by Ralph Waldo Pickle Chips to worship the Aeon Worm. However, in "Season of the Worm" He began to have a crisis of doubt and began to develop a sense of right and wrong. In "Season of the Mitch" he proudly professes his doubt of the worm and allows himself to be possessed by the paralyzed horse in order to defeat the worm. After the worm was defeated he was carried off in praise by the other hamsters for saving them from the worms mind control by choosing right from wrong.
- Jenna (voiced by Jinkx Monsoon): An old friend of the Bravest Warriors who is revealed to be evil.
- The Courageous Battlers: The predecessor team to the Bravest Warriors. Composed of Johnny Tezuka (Beth's father), Brian and Josephine Kirkman (Chris' Parents), Janette and George (Wallow's parents), and Tony and Bonnie Vasquez (Danny's parents). 2 years prior to the events of the series they ended up lost in the See-Through Zone (which contains every monster they ever defeated). Johnny Tezuka was separated from the rest of the team when he was eaten by the Aeon Worm and became Ralph Waldo Pickle Chips. They are able to communicate with their children and vice versa through Catbug and his dimension jumping powers. While the full details of their current situation are unknown, Catbug confirmed that they are alive and well. All members of the Courageous Battlers have appeared in the show, as well as a picture of them seen in "Time Slime" and "Dimension Garden".

== Episodes ==
Season	Episodes	Originally released		
Season	Episodes	First released	Last released	Network
Pilot		January 10, 2009		Nicktoons
1	12	November 8, 2012	July 18, 2013	YouTube
Minisodes	5	August 8, 2013	September 13, 2013	YouTube
2	12	October 17, 2013	June 12, 2014	YouTube
3	6	January 10, 2017	March 7, 2017	VRV
4	52	December 25, 2017	December 24, 2018	VRV

The series pilot, written by Pendleton Ward and directed by Ward and Randy Myers, first aired on Frederator's Random! Cartoons on the Nicktoons Network on January 10, 2009. The short features different designs and voice actors from the web series.

Bravest Warriors was launched on Frederator Studios' Cartoon Hangover YouTube channel on November 8, 2012. The first season was released between November 8, 2012 and March 7, 2013. The series features new character designs and casting from the original pilot. Breehn Burns, Will McRobb and Chris Viscardi, and Fred Seibert developed and executive produced the Bravest Warriors series for Frederator Studios. Burns, writer and director of Bravest Warriors, is the co-head of Lone Sausage Productions and the co-creator of the award-winning animated short, Dr. Tran. A second season began on October 17, 2013. The series began streaming on the Nintendo Video service for the Nintendo 3DS in North America from November 2013.

On July 20, 2016, Cartoon Hangover announced that all Season 3 episodes of Bravest Warriors would be aired exclusively on VRV, a streaming platform programmed by Ellation. Season 3, along with the previous two seasons, was launched on the Cartoon Hangover Select channel starting on January 10, 2017. On September 14, 2018, the third season's episodes were uploaded internationally on the series's YouTube channel.

Seasons 3 and 4 of Bravest Warriors were removed from VRV after Cartoon Hangover was removed from the service in December 2021. Season 4 was rereleased on the Cartoon Hangover YouTube channel on January 26, 2024.

== Comics ==
A comic book adaptation of Bravest Warriors announced by Boom! Comics at San Diego Comic-Con began publication on Boom!'s kaboom! label from October 24, 2012, and ran for 36 issues. The final four issues have not been released as part of a trade collection. At San Diego Comic-Con in 2013, it was announced that Cartoon Hangover had teamed up with Viz Media to make comics and graphic novels of their properties, with Bravest Warriors being one of the titles announced under their Perfect Square imprint. They were announced to be released in 2014.

#	Date	Writer/s	Artist/s	Collection
1	October 2012	Joey Comeau	Mike Holmes	Volume One
2	November 2012	Joey Comeau	Mike Holmes	Volume One
3	December 2012	Joey Comeau	Mike Holmes	Volume One
4	January 2013	Joey Comeau	Mike Holmes	Volume One
5	February 2013	Joey Comeau	Mike Holmes	Volume Two
6	March 2013	Joey Comeau	Mike Holmes	Volume Two
7	April 2013	Joey Comeau	Mike Holmes	Volume Two
8	May 2013	Joey Comeau	Mike Holmes	Volume Two
9	June 12, 2013	Joey Comeau	Mike Holmes	Volume Three
10	July 2013	Joey Comeau	Mike Holmes	Volume Three
11	August 2013	Joey Comeau	Mike Holmes	Volume Three
12	September 2013	Joey Comeau	Mike Holmes	Volume Three
13	October 2013	Eric M. Esquivel	Mike Holmes	Volume Four
14	November 2013	Breehn Burns & Jason Johnson	Mike Holmes	Volume Four
15	December 2013	Ryan Pequin, Coleman Engle & Tessa Stone	Mike Holmes	Volume Four
16	January 2014	Tessa Stone	Mike Holmes	Volume Four
17	February 2014	Breehn Burns & Jason Johnson	Mike Holmes	Volume Five
18	March 2014	Breehn Burns & Jason Johnson	Mike Holmes	Volume Five
19	April 2014	Breehn Burns & Jason Johnson	Mike Holmes	Volume Five
20	May 2014	Breehn Burns & Jason Johnson	Mike Holmes	Volume Five
21	June 2014	Kate Leth	Ian McGinty	Volume Six
22	July 2014	Kate Leth	Ian McGinty	Volume Six
23	August 2014	Kate Leth	Ian McGinty	Volume Six
24	September 2014	Kate Leth	Ian McGinty	Volume Six
25	October 2014	Kate Leth	Ian McGinty	Volume Seven
26	November 2014	Kate Leth	Ian McGinty	Volume Seven
27	December 2014	Kate Leth	Ian McGinty	Volume Seven
28	January 2015	Kate Leth	Ian McGinty	Volume Seven
29	February 2015	Kate Leth	Ian McGinty	Volume Eight
30	March 2015	Kate Leth	Ian McGinty	Volume Eight
31	April 2015	Kate Leth	Ian McGinty	Volume Eight
32	May 2015	Kate Leth	Ian McGinty	Volume Eight
33	June 2015	Kate Leth	Ian McGinty	
34	July 2015	Kate Leth	Ian McGinty	
35	August 2015	Kate Leth	Ian McGinty	
36	September 2015	Kate Leth	Ian McGinty	

=== Specials ===
Title	Date	Stories	Writer/s	Artist/s
Bravest Warriors: 2014 Annual	January 2014	A is for...	Kate Leth	
Bravest Warriors: 2014 Annual	January 2014	Love-Rejuvenation	Coleman Engle	
Bravest Warriors: 2014 Annual	January 2014	We Killed Catbug	Monica Ray	
Bravest Warriors: 2014 Annual	January 2014	Catbug and the Cosmic Quest	Sloane Leong	
Bravest Warriors: Impossibear Special	June 2014	Drop the Beat	Kevin Church	Jess Fink
Bravest Warriors: Impossibear Special	June 2014	Impossi-Bagel	Jeremy Sorese	
Bravest Warriors: Impossibear Special	June 2014	Save Us!	Nikki Mannino	Nikki Mannino; Mickey Quinn (colors)
Bravest Warriors: Impossibear Special	June 2014	Night Trap	Kevin Panetta	Paulina Ganucheau
Bravest Warriors: Impossibear Special	June 2014	Whiz Biz	Kat Leyh	
Bravest Warriors: Paralyzed Horse Giant	November 2014			
Bravest Warriors: Paralyzed Horse Giant	November 2014	Jellyfish Beach	James Tynion IV	Erica Henderson
Bravest Warriors: Paralyzed Horse Giant	November 2014	Flies	Kat Leyh	
Bravest Warriors: Paralyzed Horse Giant	November 2014	Got Your Back	Tessa Stone	
Bravest Warriors: Paralyzed Horse Giant	November 2014	Paralyzed With Hunger	Pranas T. Naujokaitis	
Bravest Warriors: Paralyzed Horse Giant	November 2014	Outside the Realm of Time	Mairghread Scott	Meredith McClaren
Bravest Warriors: Tales from the Holo John #1	May 2015	Mr. Tickles	John Omohundro	Eryk Donovan; Whitney Cogar (colors)
Bravest Warriors: Tales from the Holo John #1	May 2015	Heist	Kat Leyh	
Bravest Warriors: Tales from the Holo John #1	May 2015	Do Holo Johns Dream of Electric Pee?	Ryan Ferrier	Jorge Corona; Jeremy Lawson (colors)
Bravest Warriors: Tales from the Holo John #1	May 2015	Father/Daughter Fun Day	Paul Allor	Adam Del Re
Bravest Warriors: Tales from the Holo John #1	May 2015	Plant Bonanza	Mad Rupert	Mad Rupert; Whitney Cogar (colors)

== Reception ==
The series was positively received. Emily Ashby of Common Sense Media argued that in the series, "goofy heroes time-travel [and] hilarity ensues." She also said that the series has "some slightly mature references" including allusions to sexual intercourse, but called the series notable for its combination of absurdist humor, sense of duty, and self-reliance as themes. She also praised the animation and writing which make it appealing to parents and kids alike, and argued that the show's strength "lies in its humor."
