= Invader Zim: Enter the Florpus =

- Promotional release poster
- Directed by: Hae Young Jung; Young Kyun Park; Jhonen Vasquez
- Written by: Jhonen Vasquez
- Based on: Invader Zim by Jhonen Vasquez
- Produced by: Joann Estoesta
- Starring: Richard Steven Horvitz; Rosearik Rikki Simons; Andy Berman; Melissa Fahn; Rodger Bumpass; Wally Wingert; Kevin McDonald; Olivia d'Abo
- Edited by: Jonathan Sims
- Music by: Kevin Manthei
- Production companies: Nickelodeon Movies; Nickelodeon Animation Studio; Wumberlog Productions
- Distributed by: Netflix
- Release date: August 16, 2019
- Running time: 71 minutes
- Country: United States
- Language: English

Invader Zim: Enter the Florpus is a 2019 American animated science fiction comedy film based on Jhonen Vasquez's eponymous television series. Serving as a continuation of the series following its 2002 cancellation, the film was directed by Hae Young Jung, Young Kyun Park and Vasquez, the latter of whom wrote its screenplay. In the film, Zim accidentally initiates a cataclysmic event while attempting to gain recognition from his superiors, and his nemesis, paranormal investigator Dib, must reverse it.

Richard Steven Horvitz, Rosearik Rikki Simons, Andy Berman, Melissa Fahn, Rodger Bumpass, Vasquez, Wally Wingert, Kevin McDonald and Olivia d'Abo reprise their voice roles from the series. The film was conceived after several discussions between Nickelodeon and Vasquez on creating an Invader Zim revival after its cancellation and was officially announced in April 2017.

Invader Zim: Enter the Florpus was originally set to air on Nickelodeon, but instead was released on Netflix on August 16, 2019. The film received positive reviews from critics, with many applauding it as a strong revival to the series.

== Plot ==
When Zim reappears after a long absence, his now-overweight human nemesis Dib Membrane confronts him. Zim reveals that his disappearance was meant to make Dib too physically unfit to oppose him, allowing Zim to begin Phase Two of his plan. Zim contacts his leaders, the Almighty Tallest, but realizes that he has forgotten what Phase Two entails.

Dib regains his physical fitness with help from his sister Gaz. Their father, Professor Membrane, gives Dib a prototype device called the Membracelet, meant to harness the positive energy of the world's children, but expresses his disappointment in Dib's continued belief in aliens. An incensed Dib goes to confront Zim, but finds him in a state of depression; Zim and his robotic assistant GIR have been unable to remember Phase Two and, furthermore, have realized that the Irken Armada does not plan to invade Earth. Accepting his impending defeat, Zim surrenders to Dib, who decides to expose him during his father's Membracelet presentation.

At Professor Membrane's keynote address, Dib allows Zim to modify the Membracelet to hijack the presentation. However, as soon as Zim is free, the lights go out, Membrane disappears and the former takes over in disguise. Dib awakens the next day to find that he and Gaz are imprisoned in their own home by Clembrane, a failed clone of their father, while Zim continues distributing Membracelets around the world. After GIR compels every child on Earth to hold hands while wearing the bracelets, Zim uses Minimoose and the combined energy of the Membracelets to teleport Earth into the Irken Armada's flight path and force the Tallest to visit him. However, the irritated Tallest decide to simply destroy him along with the Earth once they reach it.

The Earth's sudden teleportation opens a "Florpus", a rift in space-time capable of consuming the planet and merging it with alternate realities, but Zim ignores the danger and begins preparing for the arrival of the Tallest. Dib and Gaz escape using a spaceship formerly belonging to Zim's Irken rival Tak and free Professor Membrane from intergalactic space prison Moo-Ping 10; Dib expresses his desire for his father to be proud of him, and Membrane tells Dib that he already is, despite Dib's belief in the supernatural. Dib lands on Earth and fights Zim for control of Minimoose to stop the Florpus, while Membrane, revealed to have robotic prosthetics, helps Dib destroy Zim's robot army. Although the Membranes are able to recover Minimoose after turning Clembrane on Zim, the Irken Armada finally arrives to destroy Earth just as it enters the Florpus. As Earth begins colliding with alternate realities, Membrane finally figures out how to teleport the planet back to its original location, while the Armada flies directly into the Florpus.

Back on Earth, the Membrane family is reunited and Zim appears at their window claiming the real goal of Phase Two was stealing one of their belongings. Zim contacts the Tallest to report his success, only to see them suffering in an alternate reality. Zim interprets their anguished screams as them being pleased with his work before he is flattened by a falling pug that GIR had launched into space earlier, which the latter promptly does again.

== Voice cast ==
- Richard Steven Horvitz as Zim
- Rosearik Rikki Simons as GIR and Bloaty
- Andy Berman as Dib
- Melissa Fahn as Gaz
- Rodger Bumpass as Professor Membrane
- Jhonen Vasquez as Clembrane, Zim's Computer, Minimoose, Schmoopsy and Bees
- Wally Wingert and Kevin McDonald as The Almighty Tallest
- Olivia d'Abo as Tak's ship
- Eric Bauza as Bracelet Monster, Announcer, Angry Man and Boy
- Breehn Burns as Neighbor and Hot Dog Guy
- Justin Roiland as Foodio 3000, an inmate at Moo-Ping 10 and an excited audience member at the Membracelet presentation
- Fred Tatasciore as Peace Day Host, Comms Officer, Ham V.O., Alien Guard and Man
- Paul Greenberg as an inmate at Moo-Ping 10 and Poonchy
- Jenny Goldberg as Floopsy, Martha, Happy Lady, an inmate at Moo-Ping 10, Girl and Gloinky
- Mo Collins as Robo-Mom
- Michael McDonald as Robo-Dad

== Production ==
=== Conception ===
Invader Zim: Enter the Florpus had been greenlit following several discussions between Nickelodeon and creator Jhonen Vasquez on creating an Invader Zim revival after its cancellation. In the years leading up to the production of the film, Vasquez had been developing projects that never came to fruition. Over the years, the higher-ups at Nickelodeon became more supportive of the idea, and around 2015–2016, when the Invader Zim comics started, Vasquez became more receptive towards it. Nickelodeon initially wanted a new Invader Zim television series, but Vasquez suggested a six-episode miniseries instead. He soon changed his mind to a television film, since doing a film would be "infinitely less stressful".

In November 2016, Harvey Beaks and Chowder creator C. H. Greenblatt was asked by a fan on Tumblr if he would work with Vasquez on a hypothetical Invader Zim film, and Greenblatt responded, "Jhonen IS making an Invader Zim movie for Nickelodeon. I'm not a part of it, but I'm excited." However, Vasquez initially denied this on his Twitter. In April 2017, Nickelodeon officially announced the film and that it was set to air on the network.

=== Development ===
Vasquez went forward with the film's story because it felt the most natural to him. He wanted to avoid the film feeling like a big event and one that was cashing in on nostalgia; he expressed his disdain for the reliance on nostalgia in Rogue One (2016) and how much he wanted to avoid that. The goal was to make it feel like the series was still on the air. Vasquez wanted the film to be accessible to viewers unfamiliar with the series, so as a result, the number of characters and the voice cast were kept to a minimum. He said, "So long as they understood the character dynamics right off the bat—this guy hates that guy, that guy hates that guy, this girl hates everybody—then they didn't really need to have an entire history of the show."

On the idea behind the anime-inspired opening scene, Vasquez said he wanted to start the film with something that audiences would not expect. He said, "Making the show with so much higher quality. And not just higher quality, like a completely different show where people who were fans of the show, people who aren't fans of the show would watch it and just think, holy shit." He enjoyed the idea of audiences watching the opening, anticipating the rest of the film, and being immediately disappointed when the art style changed. The crew had wanted Jeff Goldblum to join the cast but did not succeed.

As in the comics, Vasquez aimed to make the Membrane family more recognizable as a family unit and further define their dynamics. In addition, he wanted the film to evoke more emotion and themes than the show, while avoiding feeling too forced. A major theme is respect. Zim and Dib parallel each other in that they both seek respect: Zim from his leaders and Dib from his father. The characters losing their confidence was something they wanted to do in the series, but never got to finish it. Another theme is consumerism. The theme was more present earlier in production, in which none of the humans were aware of the events taking place around them. He felt the subplot distracted from Zim and Dib, so the theme was downplayed.

== Release ==
Invader Zim: Enter the Florpus was originally created as a television film for Nickelodeon's own network, but in May 2019, Viacom president Robert Bakish revealed in a conference call that Netflix had acquired the distribution rights to the film. On July 23, 2019, Netflix released a clip of the special with the release date shown. The movie was announced to be released on August 16, 2019.

On February 1, 2019, Nickelodeon held a cast-and-crew-exclusive screening of Enter the Florpus. On July 24, 2019, the Nickelodeon Animation Studio held an exclusive pre-screening which was only accessible for ASIFA-Hollywood members. The Frida Cinema in Santa Ana, California held a free theatrical screening of Invader Zim: Enter the Florpus on August 16, 2019, to celebrate the premiere of the film. Series creator Jhonen Vasquez, art director Jenny Goldberg, and voice actors Rikki Simons and Melissa Fahn attended the screening for an exclusive Q&A.

=== Promotion ===
Three teaser trailers for the film were released in the next four days following the initial announcement.

Invader Zim: Enter the Florpus had a panel at San Diego Comic-Con in July 2018; during the panel, some never-before-seen production art such as backgrounds and turn-around charts for the film were revealed. A trailer put together out of unedited first take animation for the film was also shown at the panel accompanied by some original music composed for the trailer by Kevin Manthei. During the panel, Vasquez explained that he put the trailer together out of some random animated footage he had for the film that he thought looked presentable enough to show people and that most of the shots used in the trailer were going to be sent back overseas to be re-animated.

== Reception ==
=== Critical response ===
On Rotten Tomatoes, the film has an approval rating of 100% based on 22 reviews, with an average rating of 7.6/10. The site's critical consensus reads: "Invader Zim quits being banished all over again in Enter the Florpus, an excellent revival that captures the spirit of the cartoon while cranking the doom up to eleven."

Charles Pulliam-Moore of io9 wrote that the film "[conveys] how much more potential there still is in the Invader Zim franchise", and noted that "By turning Zim into a legitimate threat ... Enter the Florpus both gives Dib a real reason to fight and makes you question which of them you'd want to win in the end". NPR's Vincent Acovino said "Invader Zim: Enter the Florpus serves as an excellent reminder of why the series holds such a special place in the Nicktoon canon. It's weird, smart and bracingly unsentimental." Palmer Haasch of Polygon lauded the portrayal of the relationship between Dib and Professor Membrane, calling it "The best thing" about the film.

Joe Matar of Den of Geek praised the film's "inventive moments and truly hilarious laugh-out-loud jokes", and wrote that "The art and animation look almost perfect", though he called the film's aesthetic "a little too bright and sterile". Matthew Dougherty of IGN favorably compared Enter the Florpus to what Serenity did with Firefly, while also saying "The sci-fi elements are fun, the humor is wildly absurd, and the animation is breathtaking. In this case, that's enough for this return to be worth the wait." Siobhan Ball of The Daily Dot gave the film three out of five stars, writing that "With Enter the Florpus, Invader Zim has matured without losing any of the elements that endeared it to subculture teens in the first place." Eric Vilas-Boas of Thrillist wrote that "the dazzlingly animated space battles, and the firehose stream of gross and morbid humor that make Invader Zim: Enter the Florpus well worth the long, 17-year wait." Kellen Beck of Mashable said "The best thing about Invader Zim: Enter the Florpus is the way it manages to perfectly capture the spirit of the TV show and transport my brain right back to the early [2000s]." Sol Harris of Starburst gave the film a score of 7 out of 10, saying "Enter the Florpus is a fairly typical Nickelodeon TV-movie in that it retains everything that made the show work – its humor, its characters, its tone – but it suffers from messy pacing."

=== Accolades ===
Award	Date of ceremony	Category	Recipient(s)	Result	Ref.
Golden Reel Awards	January 19, 2020	Outstanding Achievement in Sound Editing – Non-Theatrical Animation	Kate Finan, Jeff Shiffman, Jessey Drake, Tess Fournier, Ben Gieschen, Mitchell Lestner, Greg Rubin, Carol Ma, Jonathan Hylander	Nominated	
Annie Awards	January 25, 2020	Outstanding Achievement for Voice Acting in a Feature Production	Richard Steven Horvitz	Nominated	
Daytime Emmy Awards	June 26, 2020	Outstanding Sound Editing for an Animated Program	Kate Finan, Jeff Shiffman, Johnathan Hylander, Tess Fournier, Ben Gieschen, Greg Rubin, Mitchell Lestner, Jessey Drake, Carol Ma, Ian Howard	Nominated	
