= Squee (character) =

- Johnny the Homicidal Maniac / Squee! character
- First appearance: Johnny the Homicidal Maniac, No. 1
- Created by: Jhonen Vasquez

In-universe information
- Gender: Male

Todd "Squee" Casil is a fictional character in Jhonen Vasquez's comic book Johnny the Homicidal Maniac, who was later featured in his own four-issue series, published by Slave Labor Graphics. This was eventually collected as a trade paperback (TPB), titled Squee's Wonderful Giant Book of Unspeakable Horrors.

== Squee ==
Todd Casil, better known as Squee after the noise he makes when frightened, is a young boy who first appeared in issue #1, living next door to the title character, Johnny C. His parents neglect him (especially his father, who works long hours) and his only shown friend other than Johnny is a small teddy bear that he carries around named Shmee. Shmee tells Squee in a dream that all his fears and nightmares are inside him. Squee is also friends with Satan's son Pepito, with whom he attends school. He later had his own series called Squee!, which was collected in Squee's Wonderful Big Giant Book of Unspeakable Horrors. He also had another friend named Andy, but he was attacked and killed by a dog.

A quiet, introverted child who is frequently targeted by bullies, Squee has been forced to mature a bit more quickly than his peers. He is fond of writing, but only receives criticism from his teacher and taunting from his classmates. Any attempts he makes to deflect these hostilities only result in being shoved into the dirt or otherwise humiliated. Squee's mother is addicted to some form of a pill and spends a lot of time lying around in a nearly incoherent state. She often forgets who Squee is, or that she even has a child. Squee's father loathes him and never misses a chance to blame Squee for "ruining" his life, claiming that he "hasn't smiled once since [Squee] was born". Having little patience for anything Squee says or does, he eventually becomes convinced that Squee is mentally unstable, and by the end of the series, has him committed to the "Defective Head Meat Institute". Squee's grandfather claims to keep himself healthy and young by consuming his children's first-borns, and subsequently attempts to devour Squee, only to reveal in a horrifying fashion that he is in fact a cyborg and quite possibly insane.

Squee's next-door neighbor is Johnny C., aka "Nny" (pronounced knee), the main character of the series. "Nny" regularly visits Squee late at night by breaking into his room. The series focused more on the "mentoring" or "big brother" aspect of "Nny" and Squee's relationship, but little interaction occurs in Squee!, aside from the occasional drawing or note left in Squee's room, or short references to "the crazy neighbor man" (he does appear as an out-patient of "Defective Head Meat Institute", who Squee is oddly pleased to see). Squee has only one friend, albeit a possibly imaginary one, the dilapidated teddy bear affectionately referred to as Shmee. Only one real person makes any attempt to befriend Squee, a boy named Pepito who happens to be the Antichrist. During the course of the series, Squee encounters a killer chihuahua (that fatally mauls the only classmate who was friendly to him), zombified classmates, sporting mishaps, alien abductions, near recruitment into Satan's army, an encounter with his future self, a ghostly visitor, a giant murderous dust mite, and eventual committal to a mental institution despite being one of the sanest characters in the comic (however it's strongly implied he ends up hiding out with Pepito). These experiences lead him to remark to a "lamb-baby-dog-thing" in one strip that some bitter cartoonist must be drawing his life and therefore he doesn't want to get too attached to anyone or anything in it.

=== Shmee ===
Squee carries around with him a dilapidated teddy bear he named Shmee. Often, Squee talks to Shmee like a real person, confiding in the stuffed toy, who apparently responds even though their dialogue is non-readable, the one exception being a strip in which Squee has a conversation with Shmee in his dreams. Shmee claims to be a "trauma sponge", soaking up all the negative feelings and experiences and storing them inside himself for Squee. He says this will prevent Squee from becoming like Johnny C. During the silent exchanges they share on various occasions, Shmee often suggests that Squee do something violent, such as arson, in retaliation for some wrong committed against him. Squee laughs these suggestions off, assuming that Shmee is joking, though to the reader it is fairly obvious that he is not.

== See also ==
- Johnny the Homicidal Maniac
- List of Johnny the Homicidal Maniac characters
- I Feel Sick
- Johnny C.
- Jhonen Vasquez
- Invader Zim
