= Jhonen Vasquez =

American cartoonist

- Vasquez in 2024
- Born: Jhonen C. Vasquez; September 1, 1974 (age 52); San Jose, California, U.S.
- Other names: Chancre Scolex; Mr. Scolex
- Occupations: Cartoonist; animator
- Years active: 1992–present

Jhonen C. Vasquez (/ˈdʒoʊ.nɛn ˈvæs.kɛz/; born September 1, 1974) is an American cartoonist and screenwriter. His work includes creating the Nickelodeon animated series Invader Zim and its namesake comic book series, creating the comic book series Johnny the Homicidal Maniac and its spin-offs like Squee! and I Feel Sick, and directing music videos for bands such as Mindless Self Indulgence.

== Early life ==
Jhonen C. Vasquez was born in San Jose, California, on September 1, 1974. He is of Mexican descent. He grew up in East San Jose and attended Mt. Pleasant High School, where he spent much of his class time drawing in notebooks. A fan of Disney animated features, he found himself even more fascinated by alternative animation from filmmakers such as Ralph Bakshi. He later cited The Plague Dogs and The Flight of Dragons as two of the most personally influential animated films he saw as a child, while Alien was the live-action work that influenced him the most.

Vasquez also read his older brother's superhero comics as a child, but first became interested in exploring the medium through the original Teenage Mutant Ninja Turtles comics by Peter Laird and Kevin Eastman. He later said, "There was something just so different about those [Ninja Turtles comics] that I did start to obsess over them—the way the books felt dirtier in my hands, the filthy artwork and hero characters that never seemed healed over from their last battles. There was a sense of person just behind the printed page that I had never felt before, a thinner separation from production to my hands and eyes [...] it's like, the book itself was less removed from the initial moment a creator is excited about having just come up with some great idea to when they finally finish a thing, nice and polished and just a little dulled from before the thing was just another book."

During high school, Vasquez took part in a contest to design a new look for his school's mascot. He earned no prizes; however, on the back of a preliminary drawing for the contest, he drew his first sketch of who would later become the title character of Johnny the Homicidal Maniac, and the student newspaper published a number of his comic strips featuring Johnny. He also created Happy Noodle Boy while attending Mt. Pleasant. After graduating in 1992, he became a film student at De Anza College in Cupertino, California. Despite having little formal artistic training, he soon dropped out of De Anza to pursue a career as a professional cartoonist. He met Roman Dirge and Rosearik Rikki Simons at Alternative Press Expo in 1995; the former became a writer on Vasquez's series Invader Zim, while the latter voiced the protagonist's robot sidekick GIR and joined the show's coloring team. Simons also worked with Vasquez on the coloring seen in his two-issue comic I Feel Sick. In September 1996, Vasquez announced in his introductory text to the sixth issue of Johnny the Homicidal Maniac that the comic book had become successful enough for him to quit his day job.

== Career ==
=== Comics ===
Carpe Noctem magazine published early one-page strips featuring Johnny in the early 1990s. In 1995, Slave Labor Graphics began publishing a series of Johnny comics after Vasquez submitted samples of his artwork to them. Vasquez's first comic, Johnny the Homicidal Maniac, ran for seven issues and was collected as a hardcover and a trade paperback book named Johnny the Homicidal Maniac: Director's Cut. The cover features the logo "Z?", meaning "question sleep", which appears frequently throughout Vasquez's work and relates to his characters' insomnia and his own hypnophobia. The series follows Johnny as he searches for meaning in his life, a quest that frequently leads to the violent deaths of those around him as well as, briefly, his own. A photograph of one of Vasquez's friends, Leah England, serves as the middle of a portrait collection on the cover for the second issue of Johnny the Homicidal Maniac. England also gave Vasquez the inspiration for a filler strip about a child who was dangerously afraid of losing sight of his mother, as well as the notorious "Meanwhile" filler piece in the second issue of Johnny the Homicidal Maniac. Vasquez's next project was The Bad Art Collection, a 16-page one-shot comic. He stated that he did the book's art while he was in high school to discourage classmates from asking him to draw for them.

In 1997, Vasquez gave Squee, a supporting character from Johnny the Homicidal Maniac, his own four-issue series. It chronicles Squee's encounters with aliens, Satan's son, and eventually Satan himself. The trade version (which features a cover image of Squee with the words "Buy me or I'll die!") contains, in addition to the actual Squee comics, the Meanwhiles that were left out of the Director's Cut of Johnny the Homicidal Maniac, as well as comics of Vasquez's "real life" and Wobbly-Headed Bob. Vasquez's next project was I Feel Sick, colored by Rikki Simons. I Feel Sick follows a tortured artist named Devi (another character introduced in Johnny the Homicidal Maniac) as she tries to maintain her sanity in an insane vision of society, despite conversing with Sickness, one of her own paintings. Slave Labor has published three Fillerbunny mini-comics, the third having been released in March 2005. The Mini-Comic was a spin-off of a filler comic designed to replace a vacant page usually reserved for advertising space in the Squee! comics.

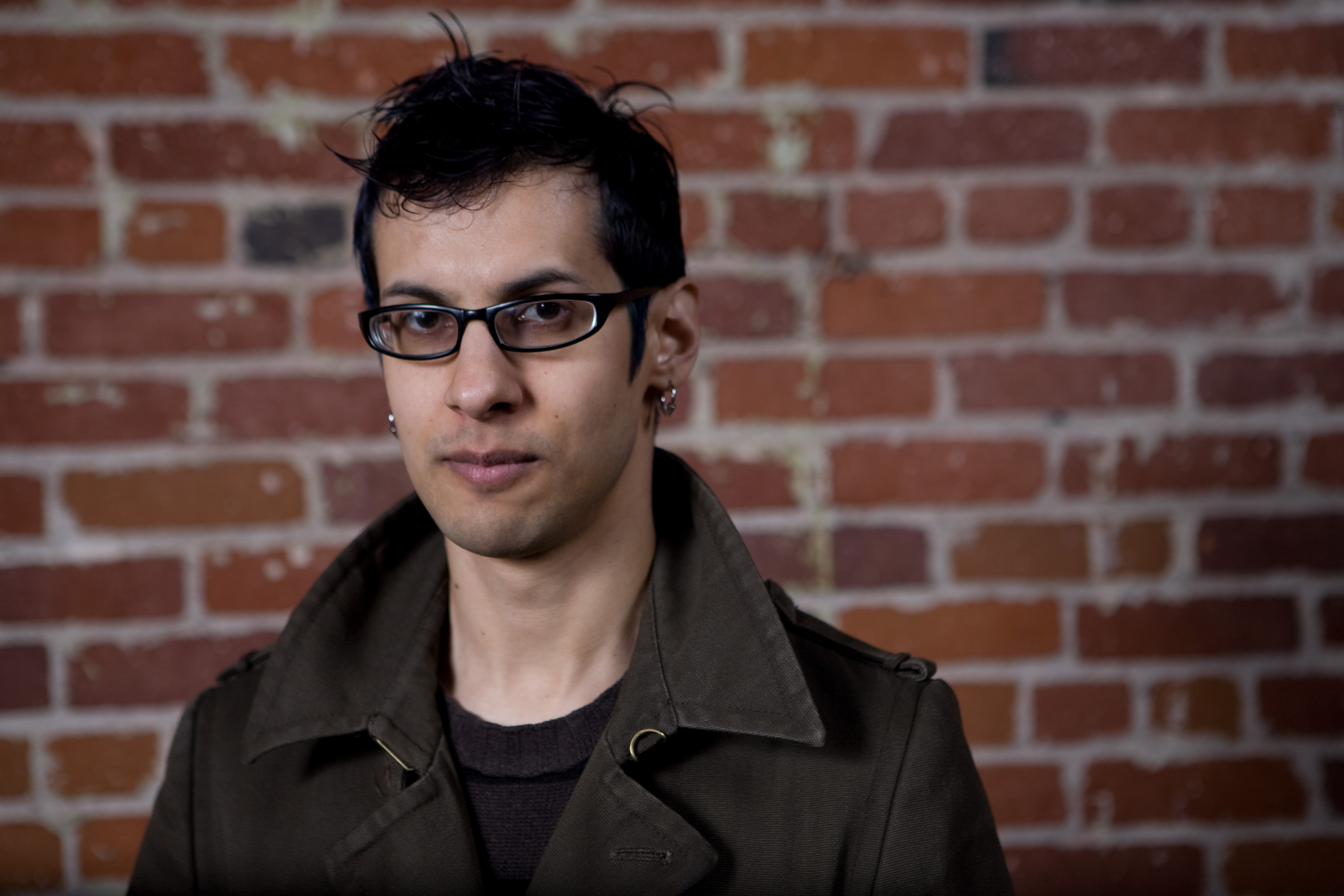
Vasquez in 2007

Vasquez said at the 2007 New York Comic Con that the original Fillerbunny comics would be done in a single night and he would rush through and do whatever he could in a small amount of time. The third issue, however, broke this mold. According to the introduction, it took over nine months to complete, and he feels it is of much higher quality than the first two. At Comic-Con 2005, Vasquez mentioned that his next comic was a love story. Since this, however, he attended an event in early 2007 and stated he was not working on his "own" comics – he was collaborating on two comics in the style of Everything Can Be Beaten, acting only as author. The first, titled Jellyfist, was intended for release on July 25, 2007, but the initial print run of Jellyfist was incredibly poor, and so it was re-released in October 2007. In 2009, Vasquez collaborated with other alternative artists in Marvel Comics' Strange Tales, issue 2 of 3, with a story about MODOK. It sold extremely well and all three issues have been collected into a hardcover trade paperback. The next year he returned for Marvel's Strange Tales II, issue 1 of 3, with a story about Wolverine.

In 2012, DC Comics announced that Vasquez joined the writing team for their digital comic Beyond the Fringe, based on the Fox TV series Fringe. In May 2014, Vasquez announced on his Tumblr page that he would be re-releasing his previous Fillerbunny comics into a new collection and additionally releasing his first new comic book in ten years.

=== Television ===
Vasquez created the Nickelodeon animated series Invader Zim in 2001, which aired on the network and later on Nicktoons. It focuses on the daily life of Zim, a naïve alien from the planet Irk who tries to conquer Earth and enslave humanity, though his attempts are constantly thwarted by paranormal investigator Dib, who knows that Zim is an alien despite nobody believing him. The first episode aired on March 30, 2001. The series lasted for two seasons before it was cancelled by Nickelodeon, who blamed low ratings, going over budget, and a lack of interest. The last episode before the show's cancellation, a Christmas special called "The Most Horrible X-Mas Ever", aired on December 10, 2002. Episodes of the third season and a finale then remained unfinished. Vasquez provided the voices for various minor characters such as Zim's computer, Minimoose, and himself as a background character (being credited as "Mr. Scolex"). He later returned to Nickelodeon in 2016 for the Invader Zim television film Enter the Florpus.

Vasquez also did character designs for the Disney XD show Randy Cunningham: 9th Grade Ninja, as well as wrote for an episode of the online series Bravest Warriors. In July 2014, it was revealed that Disney Television Animation had picked up the pilot Very Important House, co-created by Vasquez and Rick and Morty production designer Jenny Goldberg, who previously collaborated with Vasquez on Jellyfist. However, in September 2016, Vasquez announced on his blog that the show was ultimately not picked up for a full series. In 2019, he revealed that it was not picked up due to executive leadership changes at Disney.

=== Other work ===
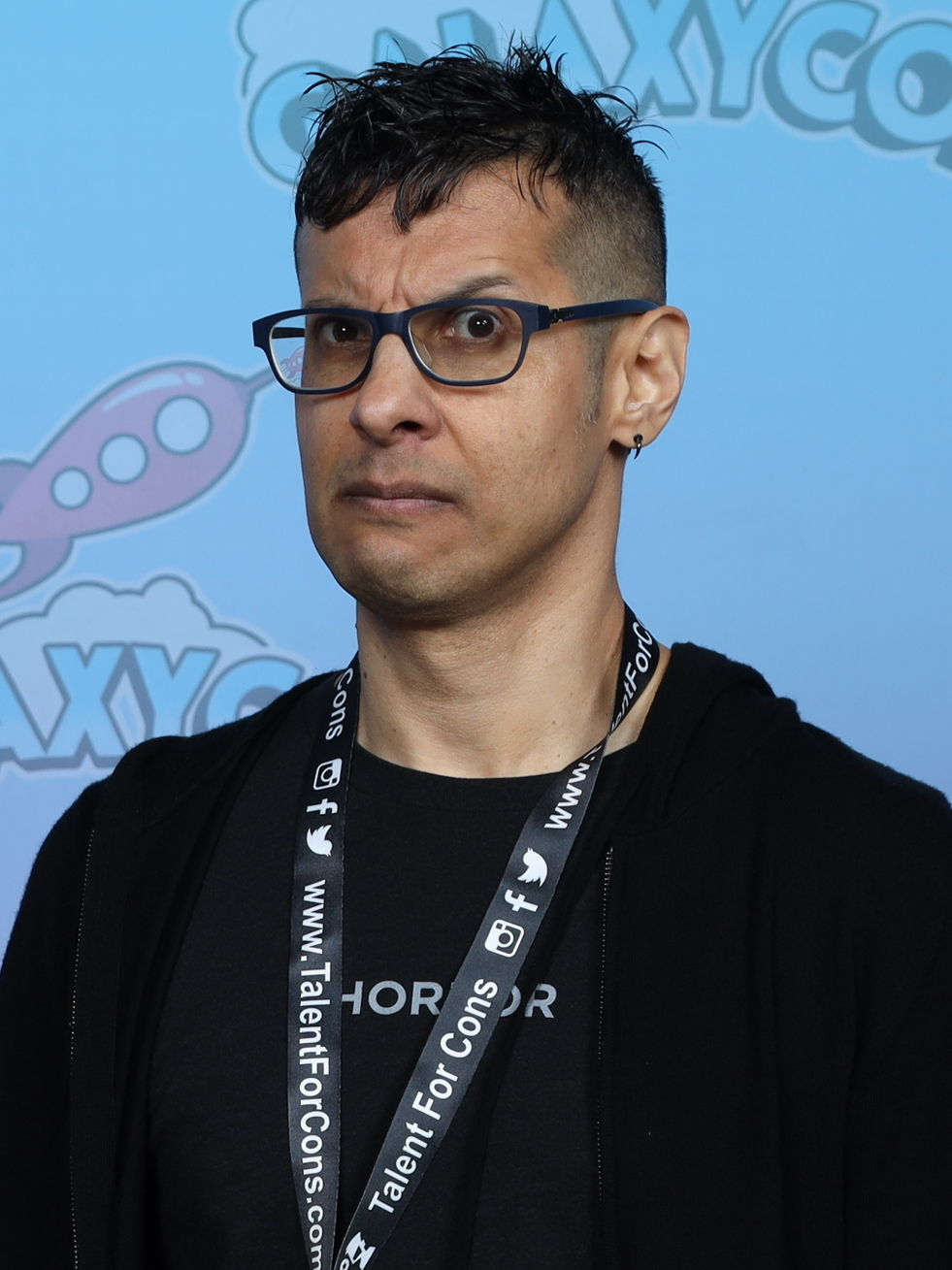
Vasquez at GalaxyCon Columbus in 2023

Vasquez collaborated with Crab Scrambly to produce the storybook Everything Can Be Beaten, published by Slave Labor in 2002. Vasquez, credited as Chancre Scolex, wrote the story and Crab Scrambly illustrated it. Everything Can Be Beaten is about a strange person who lives in a room in which he can do nothing but beat kittens. However, an adventure into the outside world changes his perspective, and he discovers that "everything can be beaten". The storybook inspired Urban Squall in 2008 to create the puzzle browser game Bloody Fun Day. Vasquez did the entire artwork for the deluxe edition of the Mindless Self Indulgence album If as well as the digital single "Mastermind". He also directed the music videos for Mindless Self Indulgence's "Shut Me Up" and The Left Rights' "White". Vasquez made the cover art for the album Zero Day by MC Frontalot and also indicated that he shows his artwork in galleries from time to time. He also did an art rendition of BioShock 2 called "The Sisters". He was quoted saying the following about the rendition:

Who says kids are good for nothing other than emergency food in disaster conditions? I don't, because at this point my badass nieces helped out quite a bit for reference. I dragged them, much like Big Sister there, out for a quick photo session and we had a damn fine time in freezing winds posing like the little, demonic wee ones that they are. Being my niece, the youngest had no problem finding that place in her heart that allowed her to simulate the howling face of a child being dragged down a nightmare alley by an unspeakable horror. Throw in a tall, monstrous friend of mine to stand in for Big Sister and you have four people with chattering teeth and trying to steal my jacket. After that, the line-art came pretty easily enough, save for an adjustment period of finding the balance between a more realistic style and not losing the strange cartoonishness.

Vasquez also worked on a Teenage Mutant Ninja Turtles short called Don vs. Raph, where Donatello and Raphael compete to see who is better, but always end up tying.

== Style ==
Screenshot of Invader Zim episode

Vasquez's characters are often highly geometric and thin with heavy black outlines, almost to the point of resembling stick figures. The protagonists in his comics are typically mentally unstable characters who live in dysfunctional societies, and whose manias are able to speak to them through inanimate objects. His storylines tend to follow a basic dark comedy formula. His art style is edgy and eccentric. A prevailing theme throughout his artwork is that of smiley faces being drawn in random areas of the comic, evoking an ironic sense of happiness in a world of chaos and darkness. Much of his writing conveys misanthropic and pessimistic themes, often for the purposes of parody and satire. Several of his works have featured goth characters or depictions of goth subculture for the purpose of satire. In a 2005 Screen Savers interview, he responded to host Kevin Pereira's comment that fans considered him "a goth king" by joking, "King, yeah, but not goth... I mean, that's arrogant."

== Works ==
=== Bibliography ===
Year	Title	Notes
1995–1997	Johnny the Homicidal Maniac	7 issues
1996	The Bad Art Collection	
1997–1998	Squee!	4 issues
1999–2000	I Feel Sick	2 issues
2000, 2005, 2014	Fillerbunny	3 issues
2002	Everything Can Be Beaten	With Crab Scrambly
2003	Slave Labor Stories	Two-page story "The Ghost with Black Fingers"
2007	Jellyfist	With Jennifer Goldberg
2009–2010	Strange Tales MAX	MODOK story in Strange Tales #2 and Wolverine story in Strange Tales II #1
2012	Beyond the Fringe	With Becky Cloonan and Andy Belanger, issues 5A and 6A
2015–2021	Invader Zim	50 issues, with multiple others

=== Filmography ===
==== Television ====
Year	Title	Role	Notes
2001–2002	Invader Zim	Various characters (voice)	Creator, writer, character designer, executive producer
2012–2015	Randy Cunningham: 9th Grade Ninja	—N/a	Character designer Credited as Chancre Scolex
2014	Bravest Warriors	—N/a	Writer; Episode: "The Puppetyville Horror"
2015	Teenage Mutant Ninja Turtles: Don vs. Raph	—N/a	Creator, writer, voice director, character designer
2016	Very Important House		Co-creator, director, writer, voice actor
2019	Invader Zim: Enter the Florpus	Various characters (voice)	Creator, director, writer, executive producer Television film

==== Video games ====
Year	Title	Role	Notes
2026	Mewgenics	Cats	Creature role

==== Music videos ====
Year	Title	Artist	Notes
2006	"Shut Me Up"	Mindless Self Indulgence	Director
2011	"White"	The Left Rights	Director

== Awards and nominations ==
- Squee! was nominated for 1998 Eisner Awards for Best New Series and Best Humor Publication.
- I Feel Sick won an International Horror Guild Award in 2000 for Best Illustrated Narrative.
- Invader Zim won an Emmy, an Annie, and the award for Best Title Sequence at the 2001 World Animation Celebration awards. It also garnered seven other nominations.
- Vasquez and his work were honored in the National Design Triennial: Inside Design Now, a 2003 exhibition at the Cooper-Hewitt National Design Museum, Smithsonian Institution.
- Vasquez received the Inkpot Award in 2015.
