= Squealer =

Squealer may refer to:

- A person who squeals, such as an informant
- Squealer (Animal Farm), character from Animal Farm
- Squealer, character from Shin Sekai Yori
- Squealer, one of the original nine Beanie Babies
- "Squealer", song from AC/DC's album Dirty Deeds Done Dirt Cheap
- Squealer (band), German heavy metal band which produced albums under the label AFM Records
- Squealer (2005 film), pornographic horror film
- Squealer (2023 film), horror thriller film

== See also ==
- Squeal (disambiguation)
- Squee (disambiguation)
