= Lone Sausage =

American production company

Lone Sausage is an independent production company that produces short animated films. The company was founded in 1998 by Breehn Burns and Jason Johnson. Their most popular production is the absurdist miniseries entitled Dr. Tran. Lone Sausage's cartoons are distributed primarily via the web through an association with Mondo Mini Shows. The shorts were released to DVD in 2006 and are frequently shown at touring festivals such as Spike and Mike's Sick and Twisted Festival of Animation. Lone Sausage is characterized by their logo of a single sausage served in a small bowl.

== Productions ==
- Beyond Grandpa (1998)
- Super Beyond Grandpa II Turbo (1999)
- Here Comes Dr. Tran (2003)
- Roybertito's :60 Second Spot (2005)
- Dr. Tran's Quiet Log Time (2005)
- DR. TRAN SUMMER SPLASH (2006)
- Dr. Tran's Peanut Butter Square Hula Quest (2006)
- Mr. Tran & The Toy Cack (2006)
- Dickable Afternoons (2006)
- The Furious Little Cinnamon Bun (2007)
- 100% ICE (2008)
- Fruit Hat (2009)

=== Dr. Tran MAIL ===
Dr. Tran MAIL is a series of webisode shorts where viewers can write in to Dr. Tran and have a cartoon based on their email:

- (Intro) Send Letters (2009): The voiceover haunts Tran once more, forcing him to read fan mail despite the fact that Tran is just learning his ABCs.
- (Season 1, Episode 1) Murder List (2009)
- (Season 1, Episode 2) AIDS (2009)
- (Season 1, Episode 3) The Specials (2009)
- (Season 1, Episode 4) Hotel Soap (2009)
- (Season 1, Episode 5) Time Machine (2009)
- (Season 1, Episode 6) Keith Cares (2009)
- (Season 1, Episode 7) Nail to the Gut (2010)

== DVD release ==
A DVD collection of all of Lone Sausage's films from 1998 to 2006 was released August 3, 2006. The DVD was self-produced and released by Lone Sausage.

The special features for Dr. Tran: #1 American Icon – The Lone Sausage Collection Vol. I include:

- Dr. Tran one-page comic insert
- The Making of Roybertito's documentary
- The Making of Dr. Tran documentary
- Creator commentary for two shorts
- Roybertito subtitles option
- Dr. Tran Reads Your Fan Mail short
- Dr. Tran G4tv I.D. spots
- Beyond Grandpa short documentary
- R.I.P. Actual Asian Male mockumentary
- Dr. Tran Comic-Con premiere footage
- Hemorrhoids commercial short

In 2004, Lone Sausage released a limited-edition DVD "single" of the popular short "Here Comes Dr. Tran".

== Showings ==
Lone Sausage's cartoons tour with Spike and Mike's Festival of Animation.

Episodes of Dr. Tran aired on G4's Late Night Peep Show. The show was originally titled Happy Tree Friends and Friends.

Their short films show up annually at San Diego Comic-Con with Spike & Mike, and at film festivals such as Sundance and Annecy. Many anime conventions around the US often have underground screenings of Dr. Tran shorts as well.
