= I Feel Sick =

Comic book by artist Jhonen Vasquez

- The cover of the first issue

Publication information
- Publisher: Slave Labor Graphics
- Format: Limited series
- Genre: Dark comedy, satire, psychological horror, supernatural horror
- Publication date: August 1999 – May 2000
- No. of issues: 2
- Main character: Devi. D

Creative team
- Created by: Jhonen Vasquez
- Written by: Jhonen Vasquez
- Artist: Jhonen Vasquez

I Feel Sick is a comic book created by artist Jhonen Vasquez, with colors by Rosearik Rikki Simons. Published in August 1999 through May 2000, it is a spin-off of Vasquez's comic book series Johnny the Homicidal Maniac. I Feel Sick revolves around Devi D, a graphic designer who must face the same supernatural and psychological forces that drove Johnny C. to lunacy.

Published by Slave Labor Graphics, it was originally intended as a single paperback but was split into two issues. Vasquez said the creation process of I Feel Sick was cathartic. Devi's problems working for Nerve Publishing and neglecting her own work are reminiscent of the peer pressure Vasquez experienced working on Invader Zim, an animated television series he created for Nickelodeon.

== Issue 1 ==
The first issue is published through Slave Labor Graphics in November 1999. It is later republished with paperback.

Main character Devi (top), Tenna, and Spooky (bottom)

=== Summary ===
The series begins as Devi attempts to destroy her own painting, but finds the painting untouched afterward. Tenna, her neighbor and friend, comes upstairs to check on her. This leads to a flashback about a date Devi had with a boy named Eddie. After the two fail to connect, Devi asks to go home and Eddie makes a forceful move on her while driving. The two crash into a tree where they are trapped in the car. Eddie has lost an eye and has glass shards inside of his brain. The only thing keeping him alive is the thought he still has a chance of sleeping with Devi. They are trapped in his car overnight until Eddie is eventually killed by a deployed airbag.

The flashback ends and Devi explains that the painting was one she never finished, and it has started talking to her. She has nicknamed the painting "Sickness," and the only way to silence it is by working. Tenna suggests that she is just working too hard, but Devi believes supernatural forces are interfering with her painting, and past experiences have given her good reason to isolate herself. She tells a story about another date with a man who defecated himself at the dinner table (as seen in Issue 2 of Johnny the Homicidal Maniac). In another flashback, Devi is approached in a nightclub by a man dressed as a vampire. He tells her about his strange obsession with vampires. When he uses a smoke bomb to dramatically leave the conversation, he sets himself on fire. On another date, Devi joked about her date being a zombie, and he bites a waiter's brain out of his skull.

Tenna is still unconvinced and asks why the "spooky painting" wants to make her go insane. Devi doesn't know, but ever since she started a new freelance job, things have gotten worse. Constant distractions stop her from painting, like phone calls and people coming over. Even Tenna has become a huge distraction, and Devi asks her to leave.

Alone now, Devi asks the painting what it wants and why it's distracting her from her work. The painting says it's simply a voice in her head and not to bother fighting. It and its colleagues are professionals who have done this before. Devi vows to work as hard as she can until the painting dries up, and she stops talking. However, she accidentally injures her hands, meaning she can no longer paint to fight Sickness.

== Issue 2 ==
The second issue is first published through Slave Labor Graphics in January 2000, then experienced republishings through Slave Labor Graphics from 2003 to 2004. The latest edition (sixth edition) is published with paperback through SLG Publishing in January 2008.

=== Summary ===
Devi promises to fight Sickness even without using her hands. Sickness says she is not the first person to catch them, one being the person who introduced the force to her. Devi realizes she is late for a meeting about a job illustrating a children's book and rushes to meet her eccentric new boss, Mr. Nerves. He orders several outlandish changes to her painting for the book. During his lecture, Devi has a flashback to her date with Johnny the Homicidal Maniac. While overlooking the town, Johnny asks what happens when someone loses their defining trait, in this case, Johnny's ability to paint.

After connecting Johnny's story with her own, Devi quits her job and rushes home, determined to beat Sickness. Several distractions in her apartment's hallway hinder her progress, and her morbidly obese neighbor blocks the hallway. Devi attempts to squeeze by and gets trapped. She hears a voice that claims to be the neighbor's fat. It tells Devi that it's psychic and will attempt to help her. It shows her a scene from her childhood when a boy by the name of Spidgey Simons gives her a Valentine's Day card. Devi coughs chalk into his face and crumples up the card. The fat says Spidgey later died of a chalk-induced asthma attack, and he was the only boy that could ever understand her.

Devi escapes and makes it to her room, finding Sickness now in the form of a doll. Sickness reveals it is using Devi's mind to grow a real body, and if Devi tries to resist again, it will kill her. After Devi quit her job, Sickness had to accelerate its plans. It offers her powers similar to Johnny's, and Devi appears to accept them. When Sickness lets down its guard, Devi pins it to a canvas with a paintbrush and removes its eyeballs. Devi says she has won and has complete control over her mind again. Now that she has Sickness's eyes, it will become a tortured audience to her life. The series ends with Devi and Tenna overlooking the town, watching a plane crash into their apartment building.

== Characters ==
Main character Devi (left), Sickness (right)

=== Devi D. ===
The protagonist, Devi, is an introvert attacked by the same forces attacking Johnny, the protagonist of Johnny the Homicidal Maniac. He was her love interest until he tried to kill her to "immortalize the moment". Their date left Johnny with severe head trauma and made Devi into a recluse. Since then, Devi's love life has consisted of a string of disastrous dates.

Since her appearance in JtHM issue 7, she has quit her job at the local bookstore to become a graphic designer and cover artist for Nerve Publishing.

=== Tenna ===
Tenna is Devi's friend and neighbor who owns a squeaky toy named Spooky whom she talks to constantly. She believes Devi's problems stem from her lack of social contact. She first appears in the fourth issue of JtHM, then called Tonja. A doll version of Spooky appears in Layla Miller's room during the Marvel Comics House of M event.

=== Psychic Fat Lady ===
An obese woman with psychic fat who shares her visions that Devi will die in a plane crash. She lives downstairs from Devi and hasn't left her apartment for at least a decade.

=== Eddie ===
One of Devi's dates, who gets in a car accident with her, trapping the two inside the vehicle.

=== Eric ===
A teenager obsessed with vampires. He first appeared in a Meanwhile section in JTHM and also briefly in Invader Zim, in another form.

=== Mr. Nevers ===
Devi's boss in the Graphic Arts department of Nerve Publishing. He received a lobotomy to remove the creative centers of his brain.

=== Spidgey Simons ===
According to the psychic fat, the only boy who would ever truly understand Devi and her last chance at true love. She rejected his Valentine's Day card in first grade and coughed chalk into his face. He later died of a chalk-induced asthma attack.

=== Johnny C. ===
The main character from Johnny the Homicidal Maniac, Johnny C. makes a cameo appearance. In a flashback, Devi remembers what led to their disastrous date in issue #2 of JtHM and realizes Johnny had the same sickness she has.

== See also ==
- Squee!
- List of characters in Johnny the Homicidal Maniac
