= Breehn Burns =

American actor

- Born: 1976 (age 49–50)
- Known for: Bravest Warriors; Invader Zim; Home: Adventures with Tip & Oh

Breehn Burns is an American screenwriter, director, producer and voice artist, most known for his work on Bravest Warriors, Invader Zim, and Home: Adventures with Tip & Oh.

Burns was the supervising producer on the 2019 Netflix film Invader Zim: Enter the Florpus.

In 2016, Burns was supervising producer at DreamWorks Animation Television on four seasons of the Netflix series Home: Adventures with Tip & Oh.

In 2012, Burns wrote, directed and executive produced two seasons of Pendleton Ward's Bravest Warriors for Frederator Studios' YouTube channel, Cartoon Hangover. He also wrote six episodes of the third season.

He was also an animator on the Nick Jr. show Little Bill from 1999 to 2000.

It has been announced that Steven Spielberg’s Amblin Entertainment is developing Aleister Arcane, the 2004 graphic novel created by Steve Niles and Breehn Burns. Jim Carrey has signed on to star and executive produce the film adaptation with Eli Roth attached to direct.

In 2008 Burns collaborated with Robert Zemeckis on the screenplay for Calling All Robots, a feature film three years in development that never came to be. Burns co-created the project with X2 screenwriter and Godzilla: King of the Monsters director Michael Dougherty.

Burns co-created the Dr. Tran animated shorts (2003) which aired on G4TV, were a staple of the Spike & Mike Sick & Twisted Festival of Animation and became a popular internet meme in the early days of YouTube.

Burns has written several issues of the Bravest Warriors comic book, published by Boom! Studios, and illustrated two graphic novels, Aleister Arcane and Gloomcookie Vol. III.

In 2007, Burns served as concept artist and main title designer for the Warner Bros./Legendary Pictures feature film, Trick 'r Treat, written and directed by Michael Dougherty.

His voice work includes a Gingerbread Man in the feature film Krampus, the Hot Dog Guy in Invader ZIM: Enter the Florpus and numerous voices on Bravest Warriors and Dr. Tran.
