= Squee! =

Spin-off comic series based on Johnny the Homicidal Maniac

- Cover art for issue one, depicting the character Todd "Squee" Casil

Publication information
- Publisher: Slave Labor Graphics
- Format: Limited series
- Genre: Black comedy
- Publication date: April 1997 – May 1998
- No. of issues: 4
- Main character: Squee

Creative team
- Created by: Jhonen Vasquez
- Written by: Jhonen Vasquez
- Artist: Jhonen Vasquez

Squee! is a four-issue comic book series by Jhonen Vasquez, published by Slave Labor Graphics, featuring a supporting character from Vasquez's previous series Johnny the Homicidal Maniac. The series was eventually collected as the trade paperback Squee's Wonderful Big Giant Book of Unspeakable Horrors.

== Overview ==
The series focuses on a young boy named Todd Casil, otherwise known as Squee. An introverted and bullied child from an unsupportive family, Squee was forced to mature a bit more quickly than his peers. He is fond of writing, but only receives criticism from his teacher and taunting from his classmates. Any attempts he makes to deflect these hostilities only results in being shoved into the dirt or otherwise further humiliated. Squee's mother is addicted to some form of pill and spends a lot of time lying around in a nearly incoherent state. She often forgets who Squee is, or that she even has a child. His father, painfully aware of Squee's existence, loathes the boy and never forgets to mention that he blames Squee for "ruining" his life, claiming that he "hasn't smiled once since [Squee] was born". Having little patience for anything Squee says or does, he eventually becomes convinced that Squee is mentally unstable, and by the end of the series, has him committed to the "Defective Head Meat Institute". Squee also has a grandfather who justifiably believes his children are only waiting for him to die to collect some kind of inheritance. His grandfather claims to keep healthy and young by consuming his children's first-borns, and subsequently attempts to devour Squee, only to reveal in horrifying fashion that he is in fact a cyborg and quite possibly insane.

Squee's next door neighbor is Johnny C., also known as "Nny" (pronounced "knee"), the main character of Johnny the Homicidal Maniac (abbreviated JtHM). Nny regularly visits Squee late at night by breaking into his room. Johnny the Homicidal Maniac focused more on the "mentoring" or "big brother" aspect of Nny and Squee's relationship, but little interaction occurs in Squee!, aside from the occasional drawing or note left in Squee's room, or short references to "the crazy neighbor man" (he does appear as an out-patient of "Defective Head Meat Institute", who Squee is oddly pleased to see). Squee has only one friend, albeit a possibly imaginary one, the dilapidated teddy bear affectionately referred to as Shmee. Only one real person makes any attempt to befriend Squee, a boy named Pepito who happens to be the Antichrist. During the course of the series, Squee encounters a killer chihuahua (that fatally mauls the only classmate who was friendly to him), zombified classmates, sporting mishaps, alien abductions, near-recruitment into Satan's army, an encounter with his future self, a ghostly visitor, a giant murderous dust mite and eventual committal to a mental institution despite being one of the most sane characters in the comic. These experiences lead him to remark to a "lamb-baby-dog-thing" in one strip that some bitter cartoonist must be drawing his life and therefore he doesn't want to get too attached to anyone or anything in it.

== Other notable characters in the series ==
=== Pepito ===
A scene in JtHM #4 includes an early appearance of Pepito. This early, slightly different design of Pepito can be seen holding the hand of his mother in the panel in which Devi recalls the day she saw Nny at the bookstore. He also appears, in this same form, in the nightmare Squee has after Johnny leaves his room at the end of JtHM #7.

Pepito is a new classmate of Squee's who happens to be the Antichrist. Squee secretly agrees with Pepito's apocalyptic rantings, but isn't quite sure those who have taunted or hurt him in his life really deserve to be punished. After inviting Squee over for dinner one night, Pepito professes his boredom with the human world, and complains to his father, Satan, that he has no one to play with in this "infernal inferno". This prompts Satan to try and recruit Squee into his dark army by using a metaphor involving breadsticks and nachos, among other things, basically implying that Squee's life will be better overall if he would simply give up his soul. Squee politely declines Satan's offer and the subject is immediately and permanently dropped. Despite this, Pepito still considers Squee and himself friends.

=== Shmee ===
Squee carries around with him a dilapidated teddy bear he has named Shmee. Often, Squee talks to Shmee like a real person, confiding in the stuffed toy, who apparently responds though no readable dialogue is ever exchanged between the two, save one strip in which Squee has a conversation with Shmee in his dreams. Shmee claims to be a "trauma sponge", soaking up all the negative feelings and experiences and storing them inside himself for Squee. He says this will prevent Squee from becoming like Johnny C. During the silent exchanges they share on various occasions, Shmee often suggests that Squee do something violent, like arson in retaliation for some wrong committed against him. Squee laughs these suggestions off, assuming that Shmee is joking, though to the reader it is fairly obvious that he is not.

== Synopsis ==
The story is told episodically, with little continuity from issue to issue.

=== Issue 1 ===
The series begins with Squee in bed praying for his father to be happy, when he notices that his teddy bear, Shmee, is not in bed where he should be; he finds him in the closet where two aliens are waiting to abduct Squee for experiments. Another pair of aliens, who are notably more intelligent than the first pair, show up, and the aliens all argue over who should get to take Squee back with them and perform their tests on him, until the second pair tricks the others and take Squee for themselves. Squee later returns home just in time to go to school the next morning. On the way he sees his only friend get attacked by a small dog after his lunch, who proceeds to drag him into his dog house where he is assumed killed. At school, a new kid named Pepito joins the class, and claims to be the Antichrist. Pepito is immediately disgusted by everyone in the class except for Squee, who he knows feels the same way as him about the others. Pepito violently attacks the other schoolchildren and decimates the school, until the teacher excuses class for the day.

=== Issue 2 ===
During a family drive, Squee is dropped off at a restaurant to use the restroom. While at the urinal, Squee hears a man in the stall groaning and screaming. As the noise becomes louder and louder, Squee becomes more nervous, until a pool of blood flows out from under the stall and Squee runs out in terror. Later, a man dressed in a large Squee costume appears to Squee on the roof, and claims to be his future self, but before he can say anything noteworthy, the ravages of unperfected time-travel techniques liquefy his spine. That night, Squee dreams he's having a conversation with Shmee, who tells him the nature of his existence, that he acts as a "trauma-sponge" for Squee, soaking up all the bad things that happen to him. Grandpa comes for a visit the next day, and attempts to eat Squee to gain vitality. This issue was created entirely with a paint brush, instead of Vasquez's usual pen and ink technique.

=== Issue 3 ===
Squee becomes paranoid that dust mites are everywhere, when a large one falls out of his pillow. Angry at being disturbed, he attempts to kill Squee. Squee is woken up in the night by the ghost of a dead girl who died in his room. At school Squee meets a dog who appears to want to be his friend, but Squee realizes that terrible things happen to anyone around him and so attempts to keep the dog away (soon after that, the dog was hit by a car) After school Squee is invited to dinner at Pepito's house, where he meets Pepito's father, Satan (otherwise known as Señor Diablo, who also appeared in the sixth issue of JtHM), who attempts to recruit him to his Soulless Army of Darkness.

=== Issue 4 ===
Squee is once again approached by the first pair of aliens who attempted to abduct him in issue 1; this time he manages to convince them that it would be smarter for them to take his parents, which they agree to. At school, Squee is bullied by a group of kids and then laughed at by a girl who is then hit with a baseball, causing her eye to pop out and Squee to run away screaming. In class, Squee questions a textbook typo which angers his teacher into ordering the other students to attack him. Squee realizes that his classmates have been turned into zombies by the administration so that they will unquestionably follow the teacher's commands. Squee is saved by Pepito, who proceeds to destroy the whole school. At home, Squee's parents return from their abduction and decide to bring Squee to a mental institution for several weeks, where he is briefly reunited with Johnny C., who is there as a volunteer for sleep study.

== References to Vasquez's own life ==
While Johnny the Homicidal Maniac was more about things that angered Vasquez, Squee! was about things that terrified him as a child. Many of Squee's fears (such as aliens and the monster under the bed) were fears of Vasquez's. He stated at the 2006 New York Comic Con that the scene where the chihuahua mauls Squee's friend was based on a similar thing that happened to him.

== Animated short ==
In 2013, it was revealed that Jhonen Vasquez was working on an animated short based on Squee!. It will be called "Squee Versus the Labyrinth of Meat". As of 2023, the short remains unreleased; Vasquez has not commented on it.

== See also ==
- I Feel Sick
- List of Johnny the Homicidal Maniac characters
