= The Nightmare Begins =

- Invader Zim episode
- Ms. Bitters introducing Zim to the class.
- Episode no.: Season 1 Episode 1
- Directed by: Steve Ressel
- Written by: Jhonen Vasquez; Rob Hummel
- Production code: 101
- Original air date: March 30, 2001

Guest appearances
- Brad Abrell as Announcer; Mo Collins as Robo-Mom and Zita; Phil LaMarr as The Letter M; Michael McDonald as Robo-Dad; Jhonen Vasquez as Computer Voice, Old Kid and Brain

Episode chronology
← Previous "Pilot"	Next → "Bestest Friend"

"The Nightmare Begins" is the series premiere of the American animated television series Invader Zim. It originally aired in the United States on Nickelodeon on March 30, 2001.

This is the first official episode to feature Richard Steven Horvitz as Zim. In the pilot episode, he was originally voiced by Mark Hamill, and then Billy West. Shortly after the cancellation of The Angry Beavers, Horvitz was brought in as a potential voice of Zim, and was asked to record over certain lines for the pilot. Though neither his nor Hamill's cuts made to an official release, he voiced Zim for the remainder of the series.

== Plot ==
On the Irken-ruled planet Conventia, the beginning of a galactic conquest campaign known as "Operation Impending Doom II" is about to start. The Irkens want all the races of the universe to serve under their already vast empire, so they plan to send their elite soldiers to make the planets vulnerable so their forces can easily conquer them. Former Irken Invader Zim, who had singlehandedly ruined the original "Operation Impending Doom" by stealing a battle mech and unwittingly annihilating a portion of his home planet, Irk, arrives uninvited.

Reluctant to have Zim involved with the new operation, the Almighty Tallest, the two leaders of the Irken Empire, send Zim away to a distant planet on the other side of the galaxy, represented on their galactic map as a sticky note with a circle drawn onto it with a question mark in the circle. It turns out to be Earth, thus ending the assignment process. On Earth, a boy named Dib intercepts a signal and hears about the empire's plans, though no one, these being his sister and father, takes any interest.

Invaders begin receiving robot assistants called SIR (Standard-issue Information Retrieval) units. Not wanting to give away advanced technology to Zim, he is given a robot constructed of garbage named GIR, who appears unintelligent, but the Tallest convince Zim that it is an advanced model. Zim and GIR head for Earth, and upon their arrival, Zim picks appropriate disguises and constructs a base. The next day Zim, attends the local school as he believes he will learn about his enemy there. Dib is there and recognises Zim as an alien, but nobody else does. Dib makes an attempt to capture Zim, but gives up when Zim gets to his base, as the front lawn is covered in laser-firing lawn gnomes.

== Production ==
=== Origin of Invader Zim ===
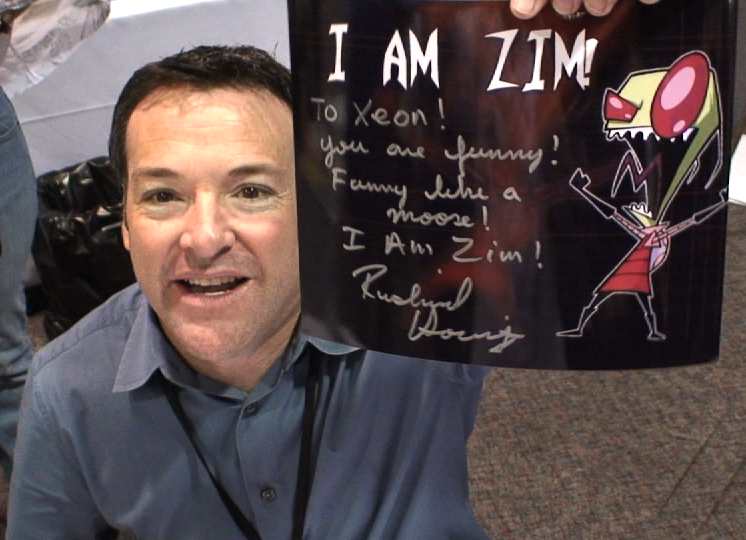
Richard Steven Horvitz was the third and final casting choice for Zim.

Prior to airing of Invader Zim, Nickelodeon desired a series to suit its "eleven to fifteen year-old" demographic. The network hired alternative comic book writer Jhonen Vasquez to create the series. Several ideas were considered by both Vasquez and the network, including a children-suited version of Mork and Mindy, but were dropped by the creator, who believed such ideas did not suit his genre of writing.

Vasquez indicated that in the final version of the series, very little of his writing style was changed, other than restricting language and certain visuals that may not be suitable for children, including that of visuals deemed by the network as similar to the September 11 attacks. The biggest difference that he cites is the change from working alone to working with thousands of people at Nickelodeon, calling it an "absolute misery". A pilot was originally pitched to the network in 1999, which featured many similar elements from the series, including a mysterious portrait of a monkey hanging in Zim's house.

Vasquez asked his friend, Mark Tortorici, to produce ideas for the theme music for Invader Zim. The two settled on a direction for the music and Tortorici and produced a final version of the theme. Vasquez's team selected Michael Tavera to compose music for the pilot episode. Vasquez said that he asked for several of the tracks that Tavera produced to be discarded and that ultimately the team had less than half of the number of tracks that they planned to submit. According to Vasquez, he and Tavera were not creatively "a great fit" for one another.

Vasquez described the pilot music as having a "more 'children's television' sound", with a "much more traditional and not as surprising" theme as he wanted, but added that the music "worked for the pilot". Tortorici's theme song and Tavera's cover version did not appear in the pilot as there was no credit sequence. Vasquez said that members of the Invader Zim crew laughed at Tavera's version of the theme because it was "cheesy", adding that the reaction was not mean-spirited and that Tavera had received little information about the series before submitting the music. Tavera did not become a part of the regular Invader Zim crew, while Kevin Manthei created the series' music.

=== Writing ===
On the commentary it is also said that the Tallest are redesigned after this episode, which can be seen by their new armour the next time they appear in the episode "Germs". All the main characters are introduced in this episode, as are the prominent locations used in the series. Important plot points such as the conflict between Zim and Dib are presented. This conflict continues throughout the series with brief moments when they're forced to work together. The episode ensures to emphasise how Dib is seen as different, with characters siding with Zim from the moment they've met him, whilst having hatred for Dib.

== Reception ==
=== Critical ===
"The Nightmare Begins" was well-received overall by television critics, and was included alongside various other Nicktoons in a Wal-Mart exclusive Nickelodeon release, Nickstravangaza! #2. Mac McEntrie of DVD Verdict commented positively on the episode, praising the "Great Assigning", and "Doom song" scenes, as well as the creation of Zim's house.

=== Ratings ===
The premiere of The Nightmare Begins garnered a 6.0 rating/17 share (about 1.8 million views) among kids ages 2–11.

=== Awards and nominations ===
In 2001, Kyle Menke won an Emmy for Outstanding Individual Achievement in Animation for "The Nightmare Begins" for his storyboarding, as did Steve Ressel, who won an Annie for Outstanding Individual Achievement for Storyboarding in an Animated Television Production for "The Nightmare Begins". That same year, Steve Ressel, Jhonen Vasquez, and Mary Harrington won the World Animation Celebration award for Best Title Sequence. In 2002, the sound crew was nominated for the Golden Reel Award for Best Sound Editing in Television - Animation for "The Nightmare Begins".
