= Ressel =

Ressel is a surname. Notable people with the surname include:

- Franco Ressel, Italian film actor
- Grant Ressel, American football player
- Josef Ressel, Czech-Austrian inventor
- Peter Ressel, Dutch football player
- Steve Ressel, American writer, illustrator and director
- Ewa Ressel, Polish translator
