= List of Invader Zim episodes =

Invader Zim is an American animated dark comedy science fiction television series that was created by comic book writer and cartoonist Jhonen Vasquez and aired on Nickelodeon. The series revolves around an extraterrestrial named Zim (voiced by Richard Steven Horvitz) from the planet Irk and his ongoing mission to conquer or destroy a dark and satirical version of the Earth. His various attempts to subjugate and destroy the human race are invariably undermined by some combination of his own ineptitude, his malfunctioning robot servant GIR (Rosearik Rikki Simons) and his nemesis Dib (Andy Berman), one of the very few humans not oblivious enough to be unaware of Zim's identity.

Invader Zim premiered on March 30, 2001. The series was targeted at older children and adolescents and met with critical acclaim. As the series went on, ratings declined and budgetary issues became more frequent. Before the second season was completed, Nickelodeon canceled the series, leaving several episodes unfinished. The show originally ran on Nickelodeon from 2001 to 2002, with six of the completed second-season episodes initially going unreleased. These episodes were first made available on DVD in 2004 and later made their television debut on the Nicktoons Network in 2006. Despite its early cancellation, it has been widely regarded as a cult classic due to increasing popularity and above-average merchandise sales.

The series consists of a pilot episode, twenty-seven episodes split into forty-six episode segments, and at least seventeen unfinished episode segments that were in production at the time of the series' cancellation. On December 24, 2011, the pilot episode aired on television for the first time. Thirty-eight episode segments were originally broadcast in pairs, each 12-minute episode segment debuting in the same half-hour. There are eight double-length episodes which run for 24-minutes each. This list is ordered by the episode order in the DVD releases, with broadcast dates noted. Every episode was directed by Steve Ressel; except the pilot, which was directed by Jordan Reichek.

A television film based on the series, entitled Invader Zim: Enter the Florpus, premiered on Netflix on August 16, 2019.

== Series overview ==
| Season | Episodes | | Segments | Originally released | | |
| Season | Episodes | | Segments | First released | Last released | Network |
|---|---|---|---|---|---|---|
| Pilot | | | | May 11, 2004 (DVD); December 24, 2011 (TV) | | Nicktoons |
| 1 | 20 | | 36 | March 30, 2001 | July 12, 2002 | Nickelodeon |
| 2 | 7 (Note: 10 segments total) | 1 | 1 | December 10, 2002 (Note: The final episode, "The Most Horrible X-Mas Ever" (S2E7), originally aired on Nickelodeon on December 10, 2002, before the rest of the second season. All six of the prior episodes from the second season were first released on DVD on October 12, 2004, prior to their respective television debuts on Nicktoons in 2006.) | | Nickelodeon |
| 2 | 7 | 6 | 9 | June 10, 2006 | August 19, 2006 | Nicktoons |
| Enter the Florpus | | | | August 16, 2019 | | Netflix |

== Episodes ==
=== Pilot ===
A pilot for Invader Zim was produced for Nickelodeon in 1999, featuring Billy West as the voice of Zim. However, because he was too busy with Futurama at the time, West was replaced by Richard Steven Horvitz in the series proper. It was first released publicly as a special feature on the Invader Zim Vol. 1: Doom Doom Doom DVD set on May 11, 2004. The pilot made its television debut on Nicktoons on December 24, 2011, as part of their "Winter Funderland" block.

| Title | Directed by | Written by | Storyboard by | Original release date |
|---|---|---|---|---|
| "Pilot" | Jordan Reichek | Story by : Jhonen Vasquez; Written by : Jhonen Vasquez, Rob Hummel, Eva Almos & Ed Scharlach | Jordan Reichek & Jhonen Vasquez | May 11, 2004 (DVD); December 24, 2011 (TV) |
Zim finds that he is severely allergic to the school cafeteria's food, and Dib uses this fact to try to prove to the other children that Zim is an alien. Zim escapes and uses a listening device planted on the back of Dib's head to spy on Dib's house—Zim discovers that Dib intends to kill him with the cafeteria food. Zim and Dib stage an apocalyptic food fight in the school cafeteria, which ends with Zim escaping and Dib being blamed for the food fight.

=== Season 1 (2001–02) ===
The first season of Invader Zim consists of twenty episodes, which are ordered below by production number and not their original broadcast order.
Note: All episodes of the series were directed by Steve Ressel.

| No. overall | No. in season | Title | Written by | Storyboard by | Original release date | Prod. code | Viewers (millions) |
|---|---|---|---|---|---|---|---|
| 1 | 1 | "The Nightmare Begins" | Jhonen Vasquez & Rob Hummel | Kyle Menke & Shawn Murray | March 30, 2001 | 101 | 1.80 |
The Irken race is having a great assigning for Operation Impending Doom II, where all Invaders are assigned a planet to conquer. Wanting to rid themselves of the irritating and arrogant Zim, the Almighty Tallest give him a faulty SIR unit (named GIR) and send him to the farthest reaches of space. When Zim arrives, he finds a planet named Earth where he sets up base and, in disguise as a human, infiltrates the local school. Unfortunately, one schoolmate, Dib, is a young paranormal investigator, who vows to capture Zim and prove that he is an alien.
| 2 | 2 | "Bestest Friend" | Rob Hummel, Roman Dirge & Jhonen Vasquez | Chris Graham & Ian Graham | April 13, 2001 | 102 | N/A |
| 2 | 2 | "NanoZim" | Jhonen Vasquez & Rob Hummel | Kyle Menke & Shawn Murray | April 13, 2001 | 102 | N/A |
Zim notices that all the other children in the school have friends except him. Zim conducts a series of bizarre tests on some students in order to select the "best" friend. However, it proves harder to lose a friend afterward than it was to gain one. After Dib sneaks into Zim's base and takes incriminating pictures of Zim without his disguise on, Zim shrinks to microscopic size, enters Dib's body, and manipulates him into destroying the storage disk with the photos on it. However, when Dib reveals he has a copy of the disk hidden in his house, Zim travels to Dib's brain to erase the memory of where the copy is hidden.
| 3 | 3 | "Parent-Teacher Night" | Jhonen Vasquez & Rob Hummel | Ron Brewer & Kyle Menke | April 6, 2001 | 103 | N/A |
| 3 | 3 | "Walk of Doom" | Jhonen Vasquez & Rob Hummel | Bryan Konietzko & Chris Graham | April 6, 2001 | 103 | N/A |
Parent-Teacher Night is approaching and Zim is confronted with the fact that he doesn't have any parents. He makes use of his robot parents to attempt to fool the students, teachers, and parents, despite knowing that they are not equipped for such a job. Zim goes on an outing to the downtown area to test a new guidance chip he installed in GIR, but when GIR removes the chip before leaving in order to store a cupcake, Zim and GIR are left lost and have to resort to public transport to find their way back. Their journey home is complicated further by Zim being temporarily blinded after looking at the sun, his disguise being mistaken for a bank robber, and his escape from the police being wrecked by GIR replacing his extra rocket fuel with tuna fish.
| 4 | 4 | "Germs" | Jhonen Vasquez & Rob Hummel | Chris Graham & Ian Graham | April 20, 2001 | 104 | N/A |
| 4 | 4 | "Dark Harvest" | Eric Trueheart & Rob Hummel | Kyle Menke & Shawn Murray | April 20, 2001 | 104 | N/A |
Zim sees a B-movie where advanced extraterrestrial life is thwarted by common germs, causing him to become germophobic and dedicates himself to exterminating all of the Earth's germs. After quickly running out of disinfectants and cleaning supplies, he heads out to buy more, but GIR runs off to a "MacMeatie's" restaurant. There Zim discovers that he can protect himself from germs using a germ-resistant hamburger "meat" made of recycled napkins, which is sold there. When a pigeon lands on Zim's head in class, he is sent to the nurse's office for having "head pigeons", but becomes concerned that the nurse may discover that he is not actually human. To avoid this, Zim steals human organs from other children. Note: "Dark Harvest" (and the series in general) became controversial when it was mentioned at Scott Dyleski's murder trial in 2006.
| 5 | 5 | "Attack of the Saucer Morons" | Jhonen Vasquez & Eric Trueheart | Chris Graham & Bryan Konietzko | April 27, 2001 | 105 | 1.40 (HH) (Note: (HH) represents the number of households the episode was viewed in when it premiered.) |
| 5 | 5 | "The Wettening" | Roman Dirge, Eric Trueheart & Rob Hummel | Ron Brewer & Kyle Menke | April 27, 2001 | 105 | 1.40 (HH) |
Zim's spaceship is sent spiraling out of control after an encounter with a bee and crash-lands in a park. Zim attempts to recover it, but a meeting of UFO enthusiasts finds Zim's ship. Zim is captured by the group once his disguise falls apart, and they begin worshipping as their prophesied alien god. Eventually, Zim gets in contact with GIR who is able to rescue him and recover the spaceship, but a second encounter with a bee causes the duo to crash-land at a much larger UFO convention. Dib discovers that water is harmful to Zim. After Dib splashes Zim with a puddle and a water balloon, Zim vows to wet Dib as a form of retribution.
| 6 | 6 | "Career Day" | Rob Hummel | Chris Graham & Ian Graham | May 4, 2001 | 106 | 1.86 (HH) |
| 6 | 6 | "Battle-Dib" | Jhonen Vasquez & Eric Trueheart | Shawn Murray & Kyle Menke | May 4, 2001 | 106 | 1.86 (HH) |
It's career day at school and Dib has been paired with a paranormal investigator named Bill while Zim goes to work at MacMeatie's. However, after discovering Zim is moulting due to "the galactic equinox", Dib tries to convince his new mentor to help him expose Zim. Dib desires to do a presentation about Zim for a meeting of the Swollen Eyeballs, a secret society focused on the paranormal. Before he can do this, the society requires that he must have a permission slip signed by his father, Professor Membrane. Professor Membrane is very famous, so he has a television show and Dib must endure various trials to gain access to his father.
| 7 | 7 | "Planet Jackers" | Rob Hummel & Jhonen Vasquez | Bryan Konietzko & Kyle Menke | August 31, 2001 | 107 | N/A |
| 7 | 7 | "Rise of the Zitboy" | Frank Conniff & Roman Dirge | Ron Brewer, Joseph Daniello & Ian Graham | August 31, 2001 | 107 | N/A |
Zim discovers that the planet is being stolen by "planet jackers", aliens who use planets as fuel for their dying sun. After failing to persuade them to leave the planet for his conquest, Zim attempts to steal the planet back. Zim is outraged when he discovers that Dib knows of a flaw in his base's defenses. He also develops a hypnotic zit after GIR covers his face in pizza grease, which he uses to gain control of the schoolchildren and force Dib into revealing the weakness in his base. At that point, the pimple grows to monstrous proportions and explodes; Zim then leaves to reinforce his base, while Dib is forced to clean up the mess.
| 8 | 8 | "Invasion of the Idiot Dog Brain" | Jhonen Vasquez & Rob Hummel | Kyle Menke & Shawn Murray | August 24, 2001 | 108 | N/A |
| 8 | 8 | "Bad, Bad Rubber Piggy" | Eric Trueheart | Chris Graham, Ian Graham & Dave Krocker | August 24, 2001 | 108 | N/A |
During maintenance of Zim's base, GIR's software is inadvertently integrated into the house's operating system. Using a time portal device, Zim hopes to go back in time and assassinate Dib's younger self. However, he discovers that he cannot send himself through time and instead decides to send rubber pig toys into the past in an attempt to injure Dib. After some initial success, Zim realizes that altering the past can cause undesirable results in the present.
| 9 | 9 | "A Room with a Moose" | Jhonen Vasquez & Rob Hummel | Chris Graham & Miyuki Hoshikawa | August 17, 2001 | 109 | N/A |
| 9 | 9 | "Hamstergeddon" | Eric Trueheart | Rayfield Angrum & Ian Graham | August 17, 2001 | 109 | N/A |
Zim orchestrates a fake field trip for his schoolmates, intending to send them to an alternate dimension that consists entirely of a room occupied by a moose. Zim's class at school gets a new hamster and Zim decides that its cuteness can be used as a form of mind control. Zim attaches a device to the hamster which turns it into a colossal and superpowered Godzilla-like monster. Unable to control it, Zim instead allows the hamster to rampage throughout the city, but is eventually forced to team up with Dib to stop it.
| 10 | 10 | "Plague of Babies" | Rob Hummel | Bryan Konietzko & Kyle Menke | September 7, 2001 | 110 | N/A |
| 10 | 10 | "Bloaty's Pizza Hog" | Jhonen Vasquez & Rob Hummel | Dave Krocker & Chris Graham | September 7, 2001 | 110 | N/A |
Zim fears that he has been seen out of disguise by a human baby. Believing the baby to be a threat to his mission, he attempts to interrogate it. He soon after finds out that they are in fact aliens that have been stranded on Earth. It's Gaz's turn to choose a restaurant for the family's annual night out. When Dib fails to return from an attempt at defeating Zim, Gaz sets out to rescue him and return in time to make it to the restaurant.
| 11 | 11 | "Door to Door" | Eric Trueheart & Courtney Lilly | Joseph Daniello & Ian Graham | March 29, 2002 | 111 | N/A |
| 11 | 11 | "FBI Warning of Doom" | Frank Conniff & Jhonen Vasquez | Kyle Menke & Shawn Murray | March 29, 2002 | 111 | N/A |
The school starts a candy fundraiser, which Zim is initially not interested in, until he finds out about a secret prize. Zim gets scared after finding an "FBI Warning" on a rented film that GIR keeps watching. Zim takes the DVD back to the mall to return the disc and avoid the wrath of the FBI.
| 12 | 12 | "Bolognius Maximus" | Jhonen Vasquez | Chris Graham & Miyuki Hoshikawa | September 21, 2001 | 112 | N/A |
| 12 | 12 | "Game Slave 2" | Eric Trueheart & Jhonen Vasquez | Rayfield Angrum & Ian Graham | September 21, 2001 | 112 | N/A |
Dib throws bologna at Zim during the lunch break at school, which dissolves his skin. As revenge, Zim places a thumbtack on Dib's chair, which Dib sits on. The next day, Zim informs Dib that he infected Dib with a virus that is altering his DNA, turning him into bologna. In revenge, Dib also infects Zim with the virus, forcing both to team up in an attempt to find a cure. Gaz is in line for a newly released handheld games console when the person behind her tricks the salesperson into giving the final console to him. Gaz will stop at nothing to obtain the Game Slave from the boy.
| 13 | 13 | "Battle of the Planets" | Jhonen Vasquez | Louie del Carmen, Chris Graham, Bryan Konietzko, Dave Krocker, Kyle Menke & Steve Ressel | April 5, 2002 | 113 | N/A |
Zim sends out probes to the planet Mars to see if the planet is of any use for the Irken Empire. When the probes send back photos of artificial-looking structures, Zim and GIR travel to Mars only to discover that the planet is actually a giant spaceship. Zim then plans to pilot Mars to Earth and kill all life on it. Dib discovers Zim's plan and gains control of Mercury, which is also a spaceship, in order to stop Zim's plan.
| 14 | 14 | "Halloween Spectacular of Spooky Doom" | Jhonen Vasquez & Rob Hummel | Bryan Konietzko & Kyle Menke | October 26, 2001 | 114 | N/A |
Dib accidentally creates a portal in his own forehead which leads to a dimension filled with monsters. Dib passes back and forth to the dimension and forces Zim to come through with him. The monsters capture Zim and say they won't release him if Dib doesn't allow them access through the portal to Earth. However, when the monsters look through the portal, they turn back as they are disgusted by the sight of GIR eating candy.
| 15 | 15 | "Mysterious Mysteries" | Courtney Lilly & Rob Hummel | Shawn Murray & Kyle Menke | March 22, 2002 | 115 | N/A |
| 15 | 15 | "Future Dib" | Rob Hummel | Rayfield Angrum & Ian Graham | March 22, 2002 | 115 | N/A |
Dib goes on his favorite television program, Mysterious Mysteries, to tell the world the story of Zim and to share a video of Zim he had filmed. To Dib's surprise, Zim, GIR, and Gaz also appear on the show to tell their sides of the story. They each tell their own versions, which are then performed in live reconstructions for the benefit of the viewer. Professor Membrane constructs an energy-creating device and Zim gets the idea to sabotage it for his latest scheme.
| 16 | 16 | "Hobo 13" | Eric Trueheart & Danielle Koenig | Chris Graham & Miyuki Hoshikawa | July 12, 2002 | 116 | N/A |
| 16 | 16 | "Walk for Your Lives" | Eric Trueheart | Miyuki Hoshikawa & Kyle Menke | July 12, 2002 | 116 | N/A |
Zim requests more powerful weapons but the Almighty Tallest do not want to give them to him, so he is sent to the deadly training planet Hobo 13 to prove his worth. Zim, through extreme selfishness and sacrifice of his teammates, surprisingly gets to the end of the trials. Zim is doing time-related experiments on Dib, but the experiment explodes. Dib manages to escape, but he is "slowed down" and can only move very slowly. Also produced is an explosion, which is also exploding very slowly.
| 17 | 17 | "Megadoomer" | Roman Dirge, Eric Trueheart & Jhonen Vasquez | Chris Graham & Ian Graham | April 26, 2002 | 117 | N/A |
| 17 | 17 | "Lice" | Rob Hummel | Rayfield Angrum & Ian Graham | April 26, 2002 | 117 | N/A |
Zim is accidentally shipped a high-powered robot mecha with a cloaking device and immediately heads off to destroy Dib with it. The robot does not come with batteries, requiring the machine to be plugged into a power outlet to stay cloaked. Unbeknown to Zim, only the robot is able to become invisible, with himself and the power cable being plainly visible the entire time. There is an infestation of head lice at the school and so an extreme lice hunter comes to investigate the outbreak.
| 18 | 18 | "Abducted" | Jhonen Vasquez & Rob Hummel | Joseph Daniello & Ian Graham | April 12, 2002 | 118 | N/A |
| 18 | 18 | "The Sad, Sad Tale of Chickenfoot" | Roman Dirge & Eric Trueheart | Joseph Daniello, Louie del Carmen & Miyuki Hoshikawa | April 12, 2002 | 118 | N/A |
Zim and GIR are abducted by an alien duo who think they are actual Earth specimens. Frustrated at how people see paranormal science, Dib sets out to disprove the legend of Chickenfoot, who is actually a man stuck inside a chicken costume.
| 19 | 19 | "GIR Goes Crazy and Stuff" | Eric Trueheart | Chris Graham & Shawn Murray | May 24, 2002 | 119 | N/A |
| 19 | 19 | "Dib's Wonderful Life of Doom" | Jhonen Vasquez & Eric Trueheart | Kyle Menke & Shawn Murray | May 24, 2002 | 119 | N/A |
Zim is frustrated with how useless GIR is, and puts him in a hyper-competent "Duty Mode". However, the new GIR sees Zim himself as a threat to their mission on Earth. Zim is hit by a muffin during the school lunch break and suspects it is Dib who threw it, but he cannot know for sure. That night, in a dream, Dib is visited by aliens who say they have given him special powers. Dib then uses these powers to threaten Zim, who willingly turns himself up and has GIR self-destruct. Time passes and Dib spends his life solving other mysteries and thwarting aliens. Finally, at a very old age, Dib is interviewed on television and admits to having thrown the muffin. At that point it is revealed that Zim had simulated Dib's entire life just to find out whether or not Dib was the one who actually threw the muffin.
| 20 | 20 | "Tak: The Hideous New Girl" | Jhonen Vasquez & Eric Trueheart | Joseph Daniello, Bryan Konietzko & Kyle Menke | May 10, 2002 | 120 | N/A |
An Irken, Tak, joins Zim's class in disguise as part of a plan to hollow out the Earth's core and prove herself worthy of being an Invader. Zim, Dib, Gaz and GIR team up to stop her. At the end, Dib laments that he is unable to explore beyond Earth, only for Tak's abandoned ship to crash right in front of him.

=== Season 2 (2002; 2006) ===
In August 2001, Nickelodeon officially renewed Invader Zim for a second season which was originally planned to consist of twenty episodes. In January 2002, Nickelodeon announced that they had plans to cancel the series effective immediately. The series finished with a total of twenty-seven out of its initially contracted forty episodes, leaving a dozen episodes originally planned for the second season to be scrapped before they could be produced. The seventh episode of season two aired on Nickelodeon on December 10, 2002. The remaining six completed second season episodes were initially unreleased, but were made available on DVD in 2004 and later made their television debut on Nicktoons in 2006.

| No. overall | No. in season | Title | Written by | Storyboard by | Original release date | Prod. code | Viewers (millions) |
|---|---|---|---|---|---|---|---|
| 21 | 1 | "Backseat Drivers from Beyond the Stars" | Jhonen Vasquez | Rayfield Angrum, Bryan Konietzko, Kyle Menke & Shawn Murray | June 10, 2006 | 201 | N/A |
Zim desires to bring his leaders, the Almighty Tallest, to Earth to witness his next plan for world domination involving a brain-eating parasite, so he remotely takes control of the "Massive". However, at the time he takes control, the Tallest are under attack from an anti-Irken resistance group known as "The Resisty". Meanwhile, Dib has been attempting to salvage/reverse engineer Tak's spaceship (which he acquired in "Tak: The Hideous New Girl") and manages to repair enough of its systems to establish a remote connection, get into Zim's computer, and wrestle for control of the Tallest's ship. When the Tallest realize what is going on, they transfer their hacked power-core to the Resisty so their ship is pulled toward Earth, forcing them to evacuate and destroy the ship to protect the secrets of its technology. The Tallest then contact Zim to punish him for what he has done, only to find that he is under attack from the brain-eating parasite.
| 22 | 2 | "Mortos der Soulstealer" | Eric Trueheart | Greg Colton & Perry Zombolas | June 17, 2006 | 202 | N/A |
| 22 | 2 | "Zim Eats Waffles" | Eric Trueheart | Rayfield Angrum & Bryan Konietzko | June 17, 2006 | 202 | N/A |
Dib summons a mystical ghostly beast called Mortos der Soulstealer to attack Zim and prevent him from taking over the world. Mortos will grant Dib anything he wants, but is tired and requests time and food to regenerate. It soon becomes clear that Mortos just wants to have fun, and spends time eating and trying on clothes. Dib confronts Zim with Mortos and demands that he fulfill his request to stop Zim, but Mortos grants a random person's request for ice cream instead and returns to his realm to rest. Dib has managed to get a spy camera into Zim's base in the hopes of recording some evidence that will prove he's an alien. Unfortunately for Dib, his hard drives aren't working and need to be automatically repaired, so Dib watches Zim while this is happening. It is a quiet day for Zim. GIR is trying to get Zim to eat waffles, but every now and then he reveals part of an evil plan or gets attacked by a giant flesh-eating squid. Every time this happens Dib tries to contact a member of the Swollen Eyeball to witness it, but by the time they answer Zim is eating waffles again, and he eventually throws up on Dib's camera. Dib's hard drives finally repair, but then the cyborgs sent by Zim destroy them.
| 23 | 3 | "The Girl Who Cried Gnome" | Rob Hummel | Joseph Daniello & Scooter Tidwell | July 15, 2006 | 203 | N/A |
| 23 | 3 | "Dibship Rising" | Eric Trueheart | Joseph Daniello & Scooter Tidwell | July 15, 2006 | 203 | N/A |
A girl selling cookies gets her foot trapped in Zim's front yard, attracting nationwide attention. The girl loves all the attention and won't let anyone simply pull her out. Dib manages to persuade the president to use a digging machine to dig under the girl to get her out, which will expose Zim's base in the process. Zim finally decides that enough is enough and simply pulls the girl out of the hole. Dib is again working on Tak's crashed spaceship, which turned on him the last time he activated it because its computer AI is a digital copy of Tak's mind. To stop it from acting so hostile to him he downloads his own personality into the ship. This does not go as planned because the ship then starts to believe that it is Dib. Zim discovers what Dib has done and reminds the ship that it is Irken technology and must do what Zim says. Zim commands the ship to throw Dib into the city sewage plant but the ship remembers that it is Dib, and throws Zim across town. The ship is so depressed that it is "Dib" that it deletes its personality.
| 24 | 4 | "Vindicated!" | Danielle Koenig | Kyle Menke & Shawn Murray | July 22, 2006 | 204 | N/A |
| 24 | 4 | "The Voting of the Doomed" | Eric Trueheart | Rayfield Angrum & Louie del Carmen | July 22, 2006 | 204 | N/A |
Dib sees school counselor Mr. Dwicky about his problems and tells him about how Zim's an alien trying to take over the Earth. Surprisingly Mr. Dwicky says he believes him and that he wants to help him out. He later reveals to a colleague that this is just a ruse to get Dib to trust him. They trick Zim into thinking aliens are coming to meet him in the woods to give him super weapons but after a while of waiting, Mr. Dwicky reveals he doesn't really believe Dib. At that point, some real aliens turn up and offer to take Mr. Dwicky with them. As he loved aliens as a child he jumps at the chance and Dib is left behind with nobody else believing him. Zim decides to use the school's election to gain power, so Dib becomes the manager of his opponent to try and stop him. Zim streaks ahead after making many promises to the students that are crazy but wins them over anyway. Dib counters this by using a cellphone to feed dialogue to a boy who is opposing Zim so he can debate with him properly. Dib's candidate wins the election, but the school faculty brings him to a lab where they remove his individuality and free will, making him nothing more than a mindless figurehead. Needless to say, Dib is not pleased, as Zim would have met this fate if not for his efforts.
| 25 | 5 | "Gaz, Taster of Pork" | Jhonen Vasquez | Greg Colton, Perry Zombolas, Chris Graham & Ian Graham | August 12, 2006 | 205 | N/A |
Dib discovers that his electronic spell drives still have two credits on them, which allow him to cast spells. Not knowing what the spells would do, he casts one on his sister Gaz instead to see what would happen, causing everything she eats to taste like pork. To help Gaz, Dib decides to go to another dimension to request the spell be undone. Gaz must face the Shadowhog and answers three questions correctly to reverse the spell. As part of a deal he imposed on the creator of the spell, Dib is stuck cleaning toilets with brushes on his head.
| 26 | 6 | "The Frycook What Came from All That Space" | Jhonen Vasquez | Kyle Menke, Shawn Murray, Chris Graham & Ian Graham | August 19, 2006 | 206 | N/A |
Zim is abducted by his former boss, Irken Frylord Sizz-Lorr, and forced to resume his previous job working in a fast food restaurant on the Irken-controlled planet of Foodcourtia. He then must escape before a massive amount of snacking causes the planet's gravity to prevent anyone from leaving for 20 years.
| 27 | 7 | "The Most Horrible X-Mas Ever" | Jhonen Vasquez & Eric Trueheart | Rayfield Angrum, Louie del Carmen, Bryan Konietzko, Chris Graham & Ian Graham | December 10, 2002 | 207 | N/A |
Zim discovers how much people like Santa Claus and decides to use this in a plan to take over the world by dressing up in a Santa suit full of data about Christmas. The Santa suit malfunctions and engulfs Zim, effectively turning him into a real Santa Claus before Dib beats it and then launches it into space. The episode ends two million years in the future in which it is revealed that the Santa suit (now massive) returns to Earth every Christmas to wreak havoc and eat milk and cookies.

=== Netflix film (2019) ===
In April 2017, Nickelodeon announced that there would be a television film based on the series. On June 26, 2018, it was announced that the film was titled Invader Zim: Enter the Florpus. The film released digitally on Netflix on August 16, 2019.

| Title | Directed by | Written by | Storyboard by | Original release date |
|---|---|---|---|---|
| Invader Zim: Enter the Florpus | Hae Young Jung, Young Kyun Park & Jhonen Vasquez | Jhonen Vasquez | Tyson Hesse, Moss Lawton, Samir Barrett, Sofia Alexander, Stephan Park, Rie Koga, Shawna Mills & Chris Graham | August 16, 2019 |
When Zim suddenly reappears to begin Phase 2 of his evil alien plan to conquer Earth, his longtime nemesis Dib sets out to unmask him once and for all.
