= Invader Zim =

American animated television series

- Genre: Black comedy; Horror comedy; Science fiction comedy; Slapstick
- Created by: Jhonen Vasquez
- Showrunner: Jhonen Vasquez
- Directed by: Jordan Reichek (pilot); Steve Ressel
- Voices of: Richard Horvitz; Rosearik Rikki Simons; Andy Berman; Melissa Fahn; Jhonen Vasquez; Rodger Bumpass; Lucille Bliss; Wally Wingert; Kevin McDonald
- Theme music composer: Kevin Manthei; Mark Tortorici
- Composers: Michael Tavera (pilot); Kevin Manthei
- Country of origin: United States
- Original language: English
- No. of seasons: 2
- No. of episodes: 27 (46 segments) (+1 pilot) (list of episodes)

Production
- Executive producers: Wumberlog Productions: Jhonen Vasquez; Nickelodeon: Mary Harrington
- Producers: Monique Beatty; Christine Griswold; Steve Ressel
- Running time: 24 minutes
- Production companies: Wumberlog Productions (Note: Only credited in the pilot.); Nickelodeon Animation Studios

Original release
- Network: Nickelodeon
- Release: March 30, 2001 – December 10, 2002
- Network: Nicktoons Network
- Release: June 10 – August 19, 2006

Related
- Invader Zim (comics); Invader Zim: Enter the Florpus

Invader Zim is an American animated television series created by comic book writer and cartoonist Jhonen Vasquez for Nickelodeon. The series centers on the titular character Zim (voiced by Richard Horvitz), an extraterrestrial from the planet Irk. His mission is to conquer Earth and enslave the human race along with his malfunctioning robot servant GIR (Rosearik Rikki Simons). However, Zim is antagonized by Dib Membrane (Andy Berman), a young paranormal investigator who is determined to stop Zim from succeeding.

Nickelodeon contacted Vasquez about pitching ideas for an animated series for their older demographic, and Invader Zim was the first thing he pitched. In Vasquez's words, "it went from pitch to series without hardly any waiting". As the series went on, ratings declined and budgetary issues became more frequent. Before the second season was completed, Nickelodeon canceled the series, leaving several episodes unfinished. The series originally aired on Nickelodeon from 2001 to 2002, with six of the completed second-season episodes initially going unreleased. These episodes were first released on DVD in 2004 and later debuted on the Nicktoons Network in 2006.

Invader Zim received positive reviews from critics and audiences, with praise primarily directed at its humor, writing, animation, art style, and the way it pushed the boundaries of what was considered acceptable on children's television. In the years since its cancellation, Invader Zim has often been listed among Nickelodeon's best shows. The series won an Annie Award, an Emmy Award and a World Animation Celebration Award, as well as receiving nominations for seven additional Annie Awards and a pair of Golden Reel Awards. Invader Zim has spawned its own fan convention called InvaderCON and a plethora of official merchandise, including video games, toys, clothing and accessories, among many other products. Despite its early cancelation and short run, due to increasing popularity and above-average merchandise sales it has been widely regarded as a cult classic.

A monthly comic book series of the same name was released on July 8, 2015, as a continuation of the television series and published by Oni Press until August 4, 2021. A film based on the television and comic series, titled Invader Zim: Enter the Florpus, premiered on Netflix on August 16, 2019.

== Premise ==
The series centers on Zim (voiced by Billy West in the pilot; Richard Steven Horvitz in the series) a member of the extraterrestrial Irken species and the Irken Empire from the planet Irk. The empire's goal is universal conquest, and its social hierarchy is based solely on physical height. An overzealous, absent-minded Zim nearly destroyed Irk and the Irkens during the empire's first galaxy-conquering plan, Operation Impending Doom I, prior to the beginning of the series. As punishment he was exiled to food court planet Foodcourtia, but unilaterally "quit being banished" after receiving word of Operation Impending Doom II.

Zim attends the Great Assigning on the convention center planet Conventia, where he meets Almighty Tallests Red (Wally Wingert) and Purple (Kevin McDonald). At the Great Assigning, the Tallest appoint Irkens as Invaders, advance scouts tasked with infiltrating and preparing target planets for conquest by the Irken Armada. In an attempt to get rid of Zim, the Tallest assign him to a presumably non-existent "mystery planet" on the outskirts of the known universe. He is issued GIR (Rosearik Rikki Simons), an ineffective, malfunctioning, and erratic Standard Issue Information Retrieval (SIR) unit hastily made from spare parts found in a trash can.

A scene from the episode "Zim Eats Waffles"

After a six-month journey across the universe, Zim arrives at the "mystery planet", which turns out to be a dystopian, futuristic, and satirical version of Earth with a mindless populace. A delighted Zim quickly goes to work and sets up his base in a city neighborhood; the Tallest are dismayed by his success. The short-statured Zim disguises himself as a human child with a green complexion (which he claims is caused by a "skin condition"), conducting espionage by attending a local school (spelled "Skool") while planning at home to conquer and enslave the world. Opposing Zim is his classmate Dib Membrane (Andy Berman), a paranoid paranormal investigator who is obsessed with the paranormal and supernatural and the only human (besides his sister) who sees through Zim's disguise. Dib is determined to expose and thwart Zim, despite the hostility and mockery he receives from his oblivious peers for doing so.

== Characters ==
=== Main characters ===
From the left: Dib, Gaz, Professor Membrane, Ms. Bitters, Almighty Tallest Red, and Almighty Tallest Purple.

==== Zim ====
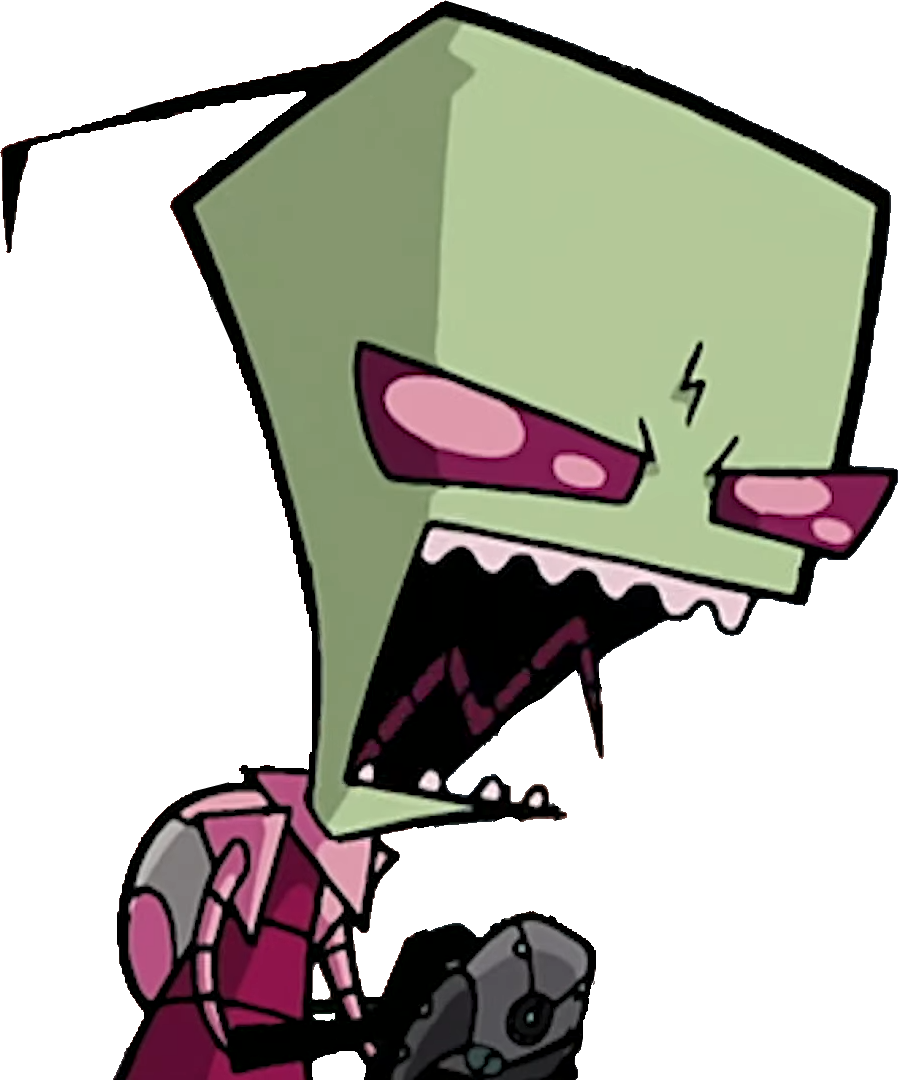
Zim

Zim (voiced by Richard Steven Horvitz, Billy West in the pilot and Melissa Fahn as a newborn in his flashback of "Parent-Teacher Night") is an incompetent Irken who is arrogant, foul-tempered, reckless, overzealous, uppity, impatient, impulsive, naive, megalomaniacal and convinced of his own greatness. He dreams of regaining his leaders' trust by taking part in Operation Impending Doom II, so Zim is assigned as an “invader” to Earth, a planet which the Almighty Tallest believe has little to no chance of existing. However, against all odds, Zim makes it to Earth and establishes a base on a fake conquest mission. Zim disguises himself as a human child using a toupée to cover his antennas and contact lenses to make his eyes look normal. No one realizes that Zim is an alien, except Dib and Gaz. Zim has no friends, and often physically harms his classmates if they attempt to befriend him. However, despite this, they always naively defend him when Dib tries to warn them that Zim is a space alien. Zim is equipped with a PAK, a cybernetic backpack-like device with life support and (among other gadgets) long, retractable robotic spider legs that enable him to move about quickly and climb almost any obstacle. Zim constantly schemes to enslave or destroy mankind, and despite his access to potent Irken technology, his plans are never successful. Zim also has a high opinion of himself, and will sometimes refer to himself in the third person.

==== GIR ====
GIR

GIR (G Information Retrieval Unit) (voiced by Rosearik "Rikki" Simons) is a malfunctioning and dimwitted SIR (Standard-issue Information Retrieval) Unit who was assigned to Zim. He was built by the Almighty Tallest out of SIR unit remains from a trash can and rubbish they found in their pockets and was subsequently passed off to Zim as a "top-secret" and "advanced model". He disguises himself in public by wearing a green dog suit, which fools most humans, despite looking and acting nothing like an “Earth dog”. Out of the pair, GIR has more interaction with Earth's social and cultural life-style. His personality is cheerful, friendly, and easy-going. GIR also has a love for Earth that his master does not share. Throughout the series, GIR has demonstrated talents such as cooking and dancing. GIR has no sense of who is a friend and who is an enemy. He also rarely understands the severity of the predicaments he finds himself in unless it involves pain or very severe danger. However, he often understands it more than his master and has on rare occasions predicted the correct outcome of a very dangerous situation.

GIR's upbeat, clueless, thoughtful, and friendly personality is a contrast to Zim's self-centered, imperious behavior. GIR enjoys taking part in Earth's culture, while Zim distances himself from it to complete his mission. Since GIR does not usually obey Zim, this often results in Zim becoming frustrated or angry at GIR. However, GIR and Zim occasionally seem to care for one another.

==== Dib Membrane ====
Dib Membrane (voiced by Andy Berman) is a young eccentric paranormal investigator who spends his time studying the supernatural and paranormal, as well as thwarting Zim in his schemes to take over the world. Dib is generally mocked, bullied and hated by his classmates because they see him as annoying and crazy. Even though Dib’s classmates tend to bully him, he is reluctantly determined to defend and save them from Zim’s evil schemes anyway. Zim and Dib often fight and hate each other, as Dib, knowing Zim is an alien bent on destroying the Earth, is determined to protect planet Earth and humankind. While they are often portrayed as mortal enemies, Dib and Zim have at times been forced to work together as reluctant teammates. Despite their feud, an unfinished episode of the series titled "Mopiness of Doom" revealed that Dib lost interest in Zim and the paranormal while Zim gave up on destroying Earth and mankind, though he later came back when Dib changed his mind and decided to hunt Zim. Dib is self-conscious over the size of his head, and usually overreacts when people point out its largeness. It is revealed in some episodes that his head serves multiple purposes; in the episode "Halloween Spectacular of Spooky Doom", it served as a portal into other worlds. People such as the police, the F.B.I., NASA Place, and “The Swollen Eyeballs” (a secret society which Dib is a member of, dedicated to discovering the paranormal and separating the fake superstitions from the real ones), tend to find Dib annoying. However, a few of these people realize just how sane Dib is and are kind enough to help him at times. Dib's secret codename as part of this group is “Agent Mothman”. Because he has cried wolf so many times, Dib finds it very hard for people to believe him, and is thrilled on the rare occasion when he finds someone who does. Nonetheless, he is willing and prepared to strongly defend the paranormal field of study whenever someone makes fun of it or claims it is not a real field of study. Before the comic book series was launched in July 2015, it was unknown what Dib and Gaz's surname was, if they had one at all. At the time of the television series, series creator Jhonen Vasquez claimed that their father Professor Membrane was actually using his first name in his title. However, the comic series has had Dib addressed as "Dib Membrane" multiple times, with the first being in a pre-Issue 0 and in an official Issue 5, with "Dib Membrane" being confirmed as the character's name in Invader Zim: Enter the Florpus.

==== Gaz Membrane ====
Gazlene "Gaz" Membrane (voiced by Melissa Fahn) is Dib's younger sister who enjoys playing video games, drinking soda and eating pizza, particularly from her favorite restaurant Bloaty's Pizza Hog (a pastiche of ShowBiz Pizza Place and Chuck E. Cheese's). If and when someone or something stands in the way of her getting those things, she is extremely vengeful and quick to lose her temper. Like her brother, Gaz knows that Zim is an alien, but does not care because she believes he is incapable of conquering the Earth. Gaz very rarely displays happiness and is usually humorless and ill-tempered, though she is sometimes amused by Zim and Dib's misfortunes. In the series, Gaz has either a lukewarm or a cold relationship with most of the other characters. She mostly dislikes her brother Dib, although she has been rarely shown to care about him. The only exception to all of the people she does not get along with might be her famous father, Professor Membrane, with whom she shares a warm relationship. Gaz has a vengeful and creepy way of stalking people who have significantly pestered or upset her, such as in the episode "Game Slave 2", when a boy named Iggins steals the new Game Slave 2 Gaz was about to receive. In the episode "Lice", it is shown that Gaz can endure pain (in that case, the lice eating her scalp) and calls the students who complain about the pain "whiners". Another example of Gaz's toughness is shown in "Dark Harvest" when Zim steals and replaces one of her organs with her Game Slave, but she continues to play her game, even though it is inside of her.

=== Secondary characters ===
- Almighty Tallest (Kevin McDonald as Purple; Wally Wingert as Red): Co-leaders of the Irken race. The Irken Empire has a hierarchal class structure wherein shorter individuals are both figuratively and literally looked down upon. The tallest Irken born in a specific generation takes command of the Empire as "The Almighty Tallest". Since Red and Purple, the two current Tallest, are exactly the same height (in addition to being identical in appearance aside from their eye colours), they share equal and high-supreme power. While the Tallest function mainly as figureheads, doing little to organize the society (preferring to lounge around, goof off with one another, and eat snacks), they do hold absolute power over the populace, just below the Irken Control Brains. They travel around the galaxies to observe and supervise Operation Impending Doom II in the Massive, the largest and most powerful starship in the Irken Armada. They appear to mostly use their unlimited powers of state to amuse themselves. They tend to be petty, and often bully and cause misery to their Irken subjects, having a childish outlook of their power. Red seems to have a slight focus on conquest, and is usually seen as being more intelligent than Purple, who commonly acts comically goofy. Red and Purple are always seen together and get along well, acting in a brotherly manner toward each other as they enjoy sharing in their power, despite their personalities contrasting. Along with their quirky obsessions with snack food and puppets, they also greatly enjoy poking fun at Zim. They both hate Zim due to his annoying, rebellious, sadistic, and destructive behavior (as does the rest of the Irken race).
- Professor Membrane (Rodger Bumpass): A scientist who hosts the popular television show Probing the Membrane of Science and the father of Dib and Gaz. Membrane's scientific abilities are offset by incredibly poor parenting: his primary method of managing his children is by way of a floating digital projection screen-and his messages to them are often not only prerecorded, but woefully out of date. Professor Membrane is very rarely ever home due to the world always needing his help. However, he does make it a point to once a year have a family night with his kids and spends Christmas with them. He has sometimes urged Dib to give up on the paranormal and focus on "real science". His scientific achievements ranged from useful to bizarre, ranging from restoring power during a blackout to useful inventions like "SuperToast". Professor Membrane's first name is unknown. He has the ability to fire lasers out of his hands, which Enter the Florpus reveals to be because he replaced his arms with robotic prosthetic arms after his real arms were bitten off by sharks.
- Ms. Bitters (voiced by Lucille Bliss and later Candi Milo in some video game adaptations): The teacher of Zim and Dib's class. She is a tall, slender, and elderly woman who is very grumpy, devoid of any compassionate emotion, and possesses a cynical dislike for life. She is often shown applying the school's unreasonable rules, or applying unreasonable punishments of her own invention for comedic purposes, often on Dib. She often slinks around to the sound of a cicada and is often shown literally emerging from people's shadows.

=== Recurring characters ===
- Tak (voiced by Olivia d'Abo): A female Irken who had an unfortunate encounter with Zim. The incident trapped her in a building on Devastis, the Irken military training planet, causing her to miss her chance to take the test to become one of the Irken Elite Soldiers (and an Invader). Instead, she was relegated by a Control Brain to janitor duty on Planet Dirt for 70 years, but she escaped to hunt down Zim. In "Tak: The Hideous New Girl", she comes to Earth, disguised as a human girl, and attempts to usurp Zim's mission and destroy Earth. She is thwarted by Zim, GIR, Dib and Gaz, who reluctantly work together to defeat her.
- MiMi: Tak's SIR unit. Her disguise is also holographic, to be generated as a black cat. Like GIR, she is easily distinguishable from other SIR units, having a large robotic claw for an arm. She has no dialogue in the show. MiMi is taken over with GIR's personality and is dismembered by Tak in the process during the end of "Tak: The Hideous New Girl".
- Piggy: A live pig that GIR has been seen having tea and watching movies with and seems to have a fascination with piggies, because he also has a large collection of rubber ones, which are thrown into a time machine by Zim to destroy Dib.
- Computer (Jhonen Vasquez): Zim's computer is normally seen talking with Zim. He is scattered around the house and base so Zim can talk to him whenever he needs to. The computer also seems to display defects, similar to GIR, in both that he lacks information on Earth and will occasionally change his voice tone to a much harsher version at usually completely unnecessary times and situations. In the episode "Invasion of the Idiot Dog Brain" Computer's brain is replaced with GIR's.
- Roboparents: Zim's helpers that guard his base and help make him seem more human. The Roboparents are poorly built and have an utter lack of normal parental behavior. The Roboparents frequently act inappropriately, or attack visitors to Zim's house, although in "Parent-Teacher Night" they actually reassured a parent about their son not making a soccer team, impressing even Zim.
- Minimoose (Jhonen Vasquez): A floating purple moose-shaped creature with stubby legs and antlers, Minimoose is introduced as Zim's other sidekick. The series was cancelled before he could make his official debut in the unfinished episode "Nubs of Doom"; his only appearance was in the final episode, "The Most Horrible X-Mas Ever".
- Invader Skoodge (Ted Raimi): An unlucky short and chubby Irken Invader who was assigned to planet Blorch, home of the slaughtering rat people, due to his shortness. He was the first Invader to successfully conquer a planet in Operation Impending Doom II, but is prejudiced against by the Almighty Tallest, who proceed to launch him into the planet as the first shot of the destruction. However, he survived this incident and returns in “Hobo 13”. Skoodge is loyal to the Almighty Tallest, despite the fact that they judge and resent him due to his short stature.
- Keef (Danny Cooksey): A clingy child that attends the Skool with Zim. He is seen to be overeager to have a friend in the second episode, "Bestest Friend", in which Zim befriends him to appear normal. In the episode, Zim grows tired of Keef's constant presence, and when Keef's "surprise party" for Zim jeopardizes base security, Zim tricks Keef into thinking a squirrel was him by replacing his eyes with robot eyes. He is seen in the background in numerous episodes, and has a few lines in "Lice".
- The Swollen Eyeball Network (various): A group (including Dib, known within the group as "Agent Mothman") who are determined to prove the paranormal. Some Agents are Agent Mothman (Dib's alias), Agent Darkbooty (Revealed to be a NASA janitor), Agent Tunaghost, Agent Disembodied-Head, and Agent Nessie. Found in episodes "Battle of the Planets", "Battle Dib", "Zim Eats Waffles" and "Gaz, Taster of Pork".

=== Minor characters ===
- Lard Nar (voiced by Fred Tatasciore): The Vortian leader and captain of the Resisty, a group of ragtag aliens whose goal is to defy and ultimately bring down the Irken Empire due to having their planets conquered. Captain Lard Nar’s only appearance is in Backseat Drivers From Beyond The Stars. He is from the planet Vort, which has since been conquered by the Irken Empire. Lard Nar is a Vortian scientist who had contributed to building the Massive before the Irken Empire turned on Vort. Captain Lard Nar is very intelligent, but known to be nervous and make hasty decisions. Nonetheless, he cares about his Resisty crew, and was able to save them all from crashing into the Earth in Backseat Drivers From Beyond The Stars by evacuating them all from his starship. He also activated “Shrinky Self-Destruct” on the Vort starship to protect its secret technology from being stolen by any alien thieves.
- Bloaty (voiced by Rosearik Rikki Simmons): The owner and/or mascot of the Chuck E. Cheese's-like restaurant, Bloaty's Pizza Hog. He is mostly seen in commercials. He was only seen out of his pig costume once, in the episode "Bloaty's Pizza Hog," and apparently has an eating disorder. He is an elderly, morbidly obese man, to the point of being fatter out of costume than in it.
- President Man (voiced by Jeffrey Jones): The President of the United States who appears in the series, with his most significant role being in "The Girl Who Cried Gnome". He is essentially a figurehead, being the incompetent fool he is. The stupid things he has done include leaving the coat hanger in his suit, giving up his power to "Santa" (who was really Zim in disguise), and trading the fate of a "crisis" for Ninja Star cookies, which he is exceedingly fond of.
- Nick (Jhonen Vasquez): Excessively happy human held captive by Zim for experimentation. His most notable feature is the enormous drill-like "happiness probe" in his head. He appears in "Zim Eats Waffles", "GIR Goes Crazy And Stuff" and "The Girl Who Cried Gnome".
- Sizz-Lorr (Jim Wise): Zim's chef boss, a tall, powerful, and very heavyset Irken Frylord who appears in one episode, "The Frycook What Came from All That Space". He kidnaps and takes Zim back to his true place of exile, “Shloogorgh's Flavor Monster” on the planet Foodcourtia as retribution for Zim abandoning his true assignment as a Food Service Drone before the first episode. Zim just barely escapes Sizz-Lorr while fleeing his capture on Foodcourtia, but only due to the gravity increasing from a massive amount of snacking, which prevents anyone from leaving the planet for 20 years.
- Bill (Adam Paul): Moronic paranormal investigator who believes that ghosts, the Loch Ness Monster, and Bigfoot are fake, while cereal box characters such as Count Chocofang and Frankenchokey are real. Seen in "Career Day" and "The Sad, Sad Tale Of Chickenfoot".
- Mr. Elliot (Simon Scott Bullock): Gaz's teacher. Appears to have a positive outlook but is not revealed to have very much intelligence. Seen in "Gir Goes Crazy And Stuff", "Gaz, Taster of Pork", "Parent-Teacher Night", and was going to appear in the unfinished episode "Simon sez Doom".
- Iggins (Paul Greenberg): Gaz's enemy and gaming rival. An obsessed video game nerd who was prominently featured in the episode "Game Slave 2." Iggins takes the last Game Slave 2 console, (and the American version of Vampire Piggy Hunter), thus incurring the wrath of Gaz, and he goes crashing down to earth in an elevator after giving her the Game Slave 2. Although at first it appears he had perished from the crash, Iggins exuberantly bursts forth from the wreckage, completely unharmed, while dramatically yelling his name at the very end of the episode. He appears again in “Walk For Your Lives”, but has a non-speaking role, seen getting arrested by a cop for just doing nothing.
- Peepi: The class hamster who was turned into a giant monster by Zim in "Hamstergeddon".
- Gnomes: Robotic gnomes protect the exterior of Zim's house when people are in the yard, with the ability to shoot lasers from their eyes.

== Episodes ==
Season	Episodes		Segments	Originally released		
Season	Episodes		Segments	First released	Last released	Network
Pilot				May 11, 2004 (DVD); December 24, 2011 (TV)		Nicktoons
1	20		36	March 30, 2001	July 12, 2002	Nickelodeon
2	7 (Note: 10 segments total)	1	1	December 10, 2002 (Note: The final episode, "The Most Horrible X-Mas Ever" (S2E7), originally aired on Nickelodeon on December 10, 2002, before the rest of the second season. All six of the prior episodes from the second season were first released on DVD on October 12, 2004, prior to their respective television debuts on Nicktoons in 2006.)		Nickelodeon
2	7	6	9	June 10, 2006	August 19, 2006	Nicktoons
Enter the Florpus				August 16, 2019		Netflix

== Production ==
=== Conception and early development ===
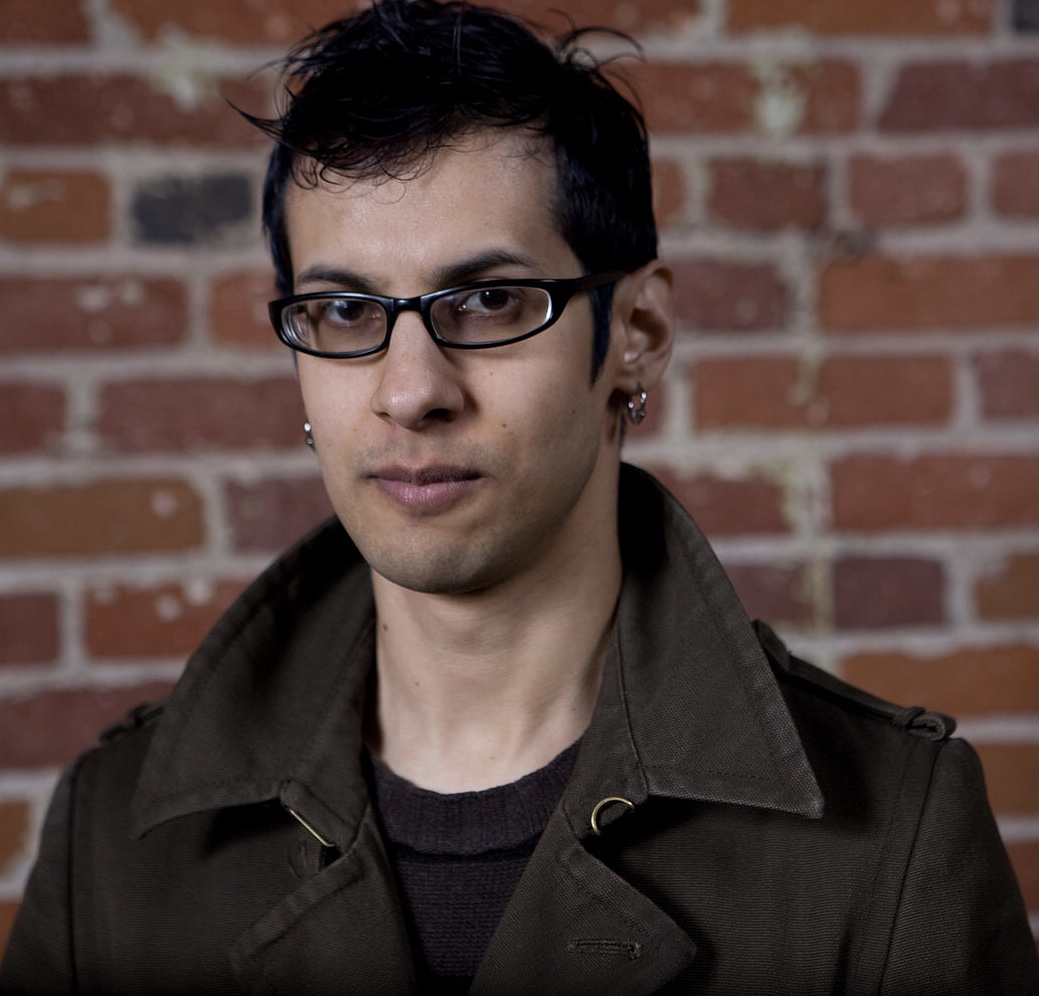
Invader Zim creator Jhonen Vasquez

There was no way I was gonna say 'no'. The fact that they took a chance on someone a lot of people wouldn't have given a kids' show to is one of the coolest things that ever happened to me in my life. — Jhonen Vasquez

Prior to the creation of Invader Zim, Nickelodeon sought a series to suit its 11- to 15-year-old demographic. Nickelodeon producer Mary Harrington was searching for something that had a similar "edge" to The Ren & Stimpy Show, when she came across a comic book called Johnny the Homicidal Maniac and was impressed with the art-style and character designs in the series. Harrington contacted the creator of JtHM, then-22-year-old Jhonen Vasquez, who had no animation experience at the time, and asked him to pitch an animated series to Nickelodeon. Vasquez accepted the offer.

Vasquez knew from the start that his previous works were not suitable for Nickelodeon, so instead of adapting something he had already done, he decided to make something new. Since he was creating a show for a children's network, Vasquez compiled together many things he loved during his own childhood, including robots, monsters, horror films, science fiction films, paranormal investigators, Monty Python, the works of Douglas Adams, and aliens. Before settling on the darker concept of an alien invader, Vasquez briefly considered doing a more light-hearted show along the lines of Mork & Mindy, with a zany alien misunderstanding Earth customs and ultimately, learning a lesson at the end. Vasquez said that while this idea probably would have found more success on Nickelodeon, he quickly dropped it, believing it would not fit his writing style. Vasquez came up with the entire premise for Invader Zim in about an hour, while sitting in bed when he could not sleep. He was inspired by the idea of an alien from an incredibly advanced race, with access to such powerful technology that he could easily take over or destroy the Earth single-handedly, but instead, he decides to stay in school all day, never thinking to sneak out.

A pilot for Invader Zim was pitched to Nickelodeon in 1999, which led to the series being green-lit. Vasquez indicated that very little of his writing style was changed over the course of Invader Zim, other than restricting certain language and visuals that may not be suitable for children. Vasquez cited that the biggest change for himself was going from working alone on a comic to working with thousands of people at Nickelodeon, saying "it's an absolute misery". However, he said the experience of working on Invader Zim was "incredibly gratifying", but also "fiendishly frustrating".

=== Animation ===
Invader Zim was produced by Nickelodeon Animation Studios in Burbank, California with Nick Digital providing the CGI animation services and Sunwoo Entertainment in South Korea providing the 2D animation services. Salami Studios provided post-production and sound services for most episodes of the series, while Encore and Hollywood Digital provided post-production services for a few episodes in season one. In season two, the animation style became slightly more stylized and pronounced in motion than in season one. Invader Zim's art style is stylized with sharp edges, thick black outlines, big heads, small or elongated bodies, and big eyes for the characters. Invader Zim's art style was initially difficult for the animators to learn. Director Steve Ressel even admitted that it was the hardest style he had ever worked on, citing the characters' heads as the most complicated aspect of their designs.

Invader Zim was one of the first animated television shows to merge 2D animation with CGI animation. During early development, Invader Zim director Steve Ressel consulted the Futurama crew to learn how to seamlessly integrate 2D and CGI animation. When the Futurama crew saw the show, they were very impressed by how seamlessly the Invader Zim crew integrated both mediums, specifically in the episode "The Wettening".

Unlike standard eleven-minute animated series, which typically average 80–120 storyboard pages per episode, Invader Zim utilized 250–350 pages to document precise character movement and performance—a level of detail that garnered significant praise from Nickelodeon.

The episode "Zim Eats Waffles" was originally supposed to be one long shot, panning between Dib's reaction and his computer screen. This was because the animators wanted to attempt the longest single shot in animation history. However, this idea was scrapped due to its limiting the episode's storytelling and its difficulty to animate. Despite this decision, the majority of "Zim Eats Waffles" still ended up as a single continuous scene.

=== Voice acting ===
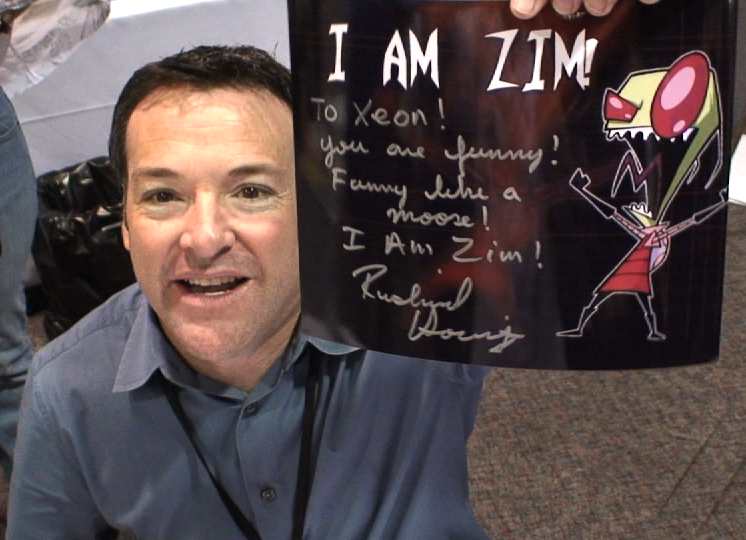
Richard Steven Horvitz was the third and final casting choice for Zim.

When casting voice actors for Invader Zim, Vasquez did not want actors who were just capable of doing zany voices because it sounded less natural to him. He made a point to cast people with speaking voices that were naturally distinct and out of the ordinary so that the cast did not have to do unnatural voices, but could instead just speak naturally.

Mark Hamill was originally hired to do the voice of Zim for the pilot episode, but was replaced before the pilot was shown to Nickelodeon executives because Vasquez felt his voice did not feel right for the character. Hamill was replaced by voice acting professional Billy West, who remained the voice of Zim for the pilot. After the show was picked up for a full series, Vasquez decided to replace West with Richard Steven Horvitz (who was already voicing the character of Daggett on fellow Nickelodeon series, The Angry Beavers), saying that West was "too well known" and that he wanted all of the voices for the main characters to be unique and not voices people had heard before. Also, because Futurama was still on the air at the time, Vasquez did not want the same voice actor to be the lead in two concurrent sci-fi comedies.

Vasquez wanted someone with no experience in voice acting to play the part of GIR, as a reflection of how broken and messed up GIR really is. Vasquez wanted someone who sounded unprofessional, but all of the actors who auditioned for GIR were "good actors" who just did a "stock crazy robot voice", which he found dissatisfying. Vasquez then asked his friend, Rosearik Rikki Simons, who was working with him on his comic called I Feel Sick at the time, to try to audition for GIR, saying he "couldn't screw it up anymore than anyone else". Simons did a few different voices for his audition for GIR, including one where he was trying to imitate his mother-in-law, but decided it was too "shrieky". He then remembered when he used to play with hand puppets with his father as a kid, and tried to do one of those voices. Simons was also a colorist on Invader Zim, and in November 1998, the same month he auditioned for GIR, he also helped color the pilot episode. Vasquez said he gave Simons the part of GIR because he was "bad at it" and that fit the character. When voicing GIR, Simons' voice was edited to make it sound higher-pitched and metallic. While Simons eventually learned to perform the voice without the high-pitched editing, the metallic quality still had to be added. Unedited versions of Simons' voice-overs can be heard in voice recordings for the unfinished episodes.

=== Music ===
Vasquez asked his friend Mark Tortorici to come up with the theme music for Invader Zim. Vasquez said all he really wanted for the theme music was military music representing Zim, mixed with futuristic, electric orchestral music. Once the direction for the music was settled, Tortorici produced the theme music on an Alesis QS8 very quickly. It did not go through many changes, but they did reorchestrate it for the TV series and stuck with it from that point on.

Vasquez's team selected Michael Tavera, who was known for composing the music for The Land Before Time and An American Tail, to compose the music for the pilot episode of Invader Zim. Vasquez said he asked for several of Tavera's tracks to be discarded, and ultimately, the team had fewer than half the tracks they had planned to submit. According to Vasquez, he and Tavera were not "a great fit" for one another creatively. Vasquez described the pilot music as having a "more 'children's television' sound," with a "much more traditional and not as surprising" theme as he wanted, but added that the music "worked for the pilot." Tavera's cover version of Tortorici's theme music did not appear in the pilot as there was no opening credits sequence. Vasquez said that members of the Invader Zim crew laughed at Tavera's version of the theme because it was "cheesy," adding that the reaction was not mean-spirited and that Tavera had received little information about the series before submitting the music.

Tavera did not become a part of the regular Invader Zim crew, and was replaced with Kevin Manthei, who was known for composing additional music for Buffy the Vampire Slayer, Scream 2, Scary Movie 2, and Resident Evil,, to compose the series' music. Manthei's music for the series is industrial and techno in nature. According to Jhonen Vasquez, Manthei's music "wasn't just an addition to the show, it was crucial for the show to be what it was." Vasquez went on to say that "Without his intense sounds lending a sense of urgency and seriousness to the ridiculous proceedings within Zim, I could never have given the good little children of the Earth as many nightmares as I did."

In 2002, the anime Internet radio station Anime Stuff R produced a radio broadcast special titled "The Kevin Manthei Invader Zim-phony Special", which featured a majority of the music Kevin Manthei composed for Invader Zim. The broadcast was extremely popular, so Anime Stuff R (temporarily renamed "Anime Stuff Z" for the special) decided to release a limited-run CD of the broadcast, with 100 copies made.

=== Challenges and censorship ===
Invader Zim would frequently come into conflict with network censorship. In The Medium-Sized Book of Zim Scripts Vol. 1, series writer Eric Trueheart would characterize the relationship between the Zim staff and the executives at Nickelodeon as "a little dysfunctional", and that "the executive assigned by Nickelodeon to oversee our show – who was, and still is, a decent guy, by the way – probably felt like he had to keep a lid on an inexperienced show creator, and as a result clamped down harder than he should have." Trueheart also speculated that the channel's other programming also had an effect on how the executives treated the show, stating that "Nickelodeon probably looked to Rugrats as the model of what a cartoon should be ... Invader Zim was none of these things." Ultimately, "There was a just a conflict in personalities, intentions, and modus operandi ... The reality was just not a great fit, and yes, it was a problem."

In some episodes, it was originally intended for certain characters (such as Keef and Iggins) to be killed off at the end of an episode, but Nickelodeon would not allow any characters to be killed off and demanded the crew add certain details suggesting that they survived or, in some cases, rewrite the episodes so that they would not die. They complied but did so in an intentionally forced and sarcastic way to purposely convey their disagreement and reluctance toward the decision, such as the sarcastic "No animated characters were harmed in the filming of this production" end-card message at the end of the episode "Hamstergeddon", where many background characters "died" onscreen.

In the DVD commentary for the episode "Bad, Bad Rubber Piggy", Jhonen Vasquez reveals that the original idea for the episode was for Zim to kill Dib off permanently, and for Dib to be replaced with a new kid named Louie. But once again, Nickelodeon would not allow any characters to be killed off permanently, so this did not happen. However, the episode's writer, Eric Trueheart, has stated that this was only meant to be taken as a joke, and that "Jhonen at no point thought he would actually kill off one of the lead characters in the series."

In "Door to Door", the virtual reality world that Zim shows people was originally going to feature a demolished city resembling New York, but Nickelodeon demanded that this be changed due to its similarities to 9/11. On reflection, Vasquez said that he prefers the new virtual reality world to the old one, since he does not like the idea of a real-life city existing in Invader Zim. The original version of this scene can be found online. Additionally, the episode "Hamstergeddon" had only aired once prior to the attacks on the World Trade Center, and would shortly thereafter be temporarily withheld from rotation as "[executives] thought the sight of falling buildings would not go over well with sensitive viewers".

One of the biggest problems Nickelodeon had with the show before it premiered was with Dib's design. Vasquez wanted Dib to wear a trench coat, but Nickelodeon opted against this because they feared Dib's clothing would remind people of the Columbine High School massacre, in which the two teenagers responsible for the shootings both wore trench coats during the attack. Nickelodeon ultimately lost this fight, and Dib ended up wearing a trench coat in the show.

Later, Nickelodeon wanted to cut Dib from the show outright because they did not think he was funny or interesting enough. Vasquez countered Nickelodeon's potential removal of Dib with "God Save the Dib", altering the character to be more engaging. One notable change from "God Save the Dib" was making Dib's head larger than his body, which became a recurring joke throughout the series.

The original name for Gaz's handheld game console was "Game Slave Advanced", a spoof of Nintendo's handheld game console, the Game Boy Advance. However, Nintendo did not like the parody and threatened to sue Nickelodeon if the name was used. So the name was changed to "Game Slave 2" instead.

Vasquez wanted to add red blood splatter to certain violent scenes in the episode "Bestest Friend", but Nickelodeon forbade it. Also, at the end of "Bestest Friend", Keef was originally going to fall off a building and onto a power line, which would have electrocuted him, but Nickelodeon was worried that kids might try to imitate this behavior and demanded that it be changed. Nickelodeon also rejected the idea of Keef being run over and spun on a car tire, citing excessive violence. In the final version, Keef gets attacked by a squirrel and falls off of a building, which Nickelodeon was fine with.

In the episode "Hobo 13", Skoodge was going to be shown eating his own skin to survive, but Nickelodeon denied this scene and the Invader Zim crew also said that they thought it was "too much".

In the original ending of the episode "Walk of Doom", Zim and GIR were dropped off in a ghetto with Mexican music playing in the background and a banner reading "Welcome to Mexico". Feeling that it would come off as racist, Nickelodeon denied this and the scenery was changed to a vaguely Mexican-looking, but still filthy town, the music was changed to disco music and the banner was changed to say "CARNE", which translates into "MEAT".

Originally, the episodes "Dark Harvest" and "Bestest Friend" were supposed to air together, but Nickelodeon would not allow it, saying that the two episodes were "too twisted" to air together. So instead, "Dark Harvest" aired with "Germs" and "Bestest Friend" aired with "NanoZIM". Additionally, "Dark Harvest" was originally supposed to be called "The Hearts and Lungs of Zim's Darkness", but Nickelodeon denied this title.

In response to these censorship and restrictions, the writers of Invader Zim slipped in ways to poke fun at Nickelodeon or simply go against their wishes. This includes the character Nick, who is a boy who is always happy, and a not-so-subtle reference to Nickelodeon's frequent demands that Vasquez make the show "happier" and more appealing to certain viewers, which Vasquez always detested.

=== Bloody GIR ===
"Bloody GIR" was created when Jhonen Vasquez drew GIR covered in blood and wanted to insert a scene with said drawing into an episode of Invader Zim. Illustrator Chris Graham snuck the picture into a single frame of the episode "Bad, Bad Rubber Piggy", as confirmed by post-production supervisor Jason Stiff and Steve Ressel. "Bloody GIR" was reportedly scattered throughout the last fourteen episodes and can be seen the most clearly during the intro to the episode "Mortos der Soulstealer". Jhonen Vasquez has stated that Nickelodeon did not learn of the image's inclusion until after the show's cancellation, and that when the executives learned, they were not offended, as younger viewers would not notice anyway.

== Cancellation ==
The kids who loved SpongeBob were not fans of Zim. SpongeBob was Nick's flagship show [and] Invader Zim [wasn't popular with the same audience, thus it] was canceled. This ended up being tragically ironic, since the market for cartoons that appealed to older audiences was just a few years away with shows like Adventure Time and Regular Show. — Sean Aitchison from Screen Rant

On January 18, 2002, Nickelodeon issued a statement announcing the show's cancellation after completing 27 episodes, instead of fulfilling the original 40-episode order. On this subject, creator of the show Jhonen Vasquez said, "I could go on and on with variations of the most fantastic reasons for why the show was cancelled, but in the end, even I couldn't give you the whole and accurate truth for why the show got pulled," he wrote in a lengthy post on his website in 2010, nearly eight years after the show wrapped. "The most likely culprits are simply ratings and the sheer expense of the show, which was monstrously expensive at the time, especially when compared to more modern, flash-based savings fests."

Nearly nine years later, in 2019, Vasquez was interviewed by Syfy and said:

I never point to any one particular thing [as the reason for why Invader Zim was cancelled.] The show could've come out at any point in history and I don't think it would ever really be appropriate... I think there's always horrible things happening in the world and genuine comedy comes from horrible things. At the time, it just happened to be things like Columbine and 9/11 and then people freak out because they don't want to offend anyone's sensibilities. It's a justified response to a certain extent; there's people who have been affected and they don't want to be reminded of this awful stuff... I just think that it did not live well with Nickelodeon's image.

In an interview with Syfy in 2018, Richard Horvitz, the voice of Zim, was questioned about why the show got canceled; he responded:

There's been a lot of rumors that have abounded for years about why Invader Zim was canceled. People think it's the Bloody GIR episode, because there's a quick subliminal shot of GIR all bloodied, but that's not it at all. Nickelodeon knew about that shot and they didn't seem to mind. But what [the cancellation really was] is this plain simple fact: We had horrible ratings. There were two things that were going on in 2001. Our ratings were not doing well, our demographic at the time was not The Fairly OddParents demographic, which is what we premiered with, and we premiered to really, really good critical acclaim. But ratings-wise, the only real barometer [was the] target audience, 6- to 10-year-olds, and I think that it was a little too much for that [demographic], and the parents also might have thought it was a little graphic for them. Our ratings never really got off the ground. One other thing that people often forget, is that the show premiered in March of 2001. By September of 2001, we had the horrible downing of the Twin Towers. Given the mood of the country at the time, I don't think people wanted to see shows that were about any kind of destruction or anything that had to do with someone trying to conquer the Earth.

== Broadcast history ==
Invader Zim was too dark and subversive for Nick's core demographic — and much of the humor flew past the heads of their younger viewers — but in retrospect Vasquez and his director Steve Ressel did everything right. The episodes never play it safe, nor are predictable. It marches to its own drummer – and that's as it should be. — Jerry Beck, Animation Historian

When Invader Zim was green-lit, Nickelodeon had desired a block of "mature, action-oriented" programming for an older demographic to compete with what Cartoon Network was doing at the time. But for unknown reasons, Invader Zim was the only series green-lit as a part of this experiment, and so the block of "mature, action-oriented" shows never materialized. By the time the show was made, Nickelodeon had decided that they were no longer interested in trying to reach an older audience, which left Invader Zim hard to place in an appropriate time slot suitable for its originally intended demographic. Invader Zim ultimately ended up being sandwiched between The Fairly OddParents and Rocket Power, which did not feel like a suitable time slot for the show, according to the creator. Invader Zim was originally intended for 11–15 year olds, but due to its poor time slot placement, it ended up being viewed primarily by 6–10 year olds, many of whom were turned off by the show's dark and disturbing nature, resulting in the show receiving poor ratings and viewership.

Even though Invader Zim usually aired late at night, the show never found a time slot the creators thought was suitable for it, and it consistently suffered in ratings among 6- to 10-year-olds, Nickelodeon's core demographic.

In an interview with IGN in 2004, Jhonen Vasquez said that when it became apparent that Nickelodeon was the "place for kids" but not "kids who want their eyes ripped out", they had asked for Invader Zim to be transferred to MTV or a more "adult network" similar to what Nickelodeon had previously done with The Ren & Stimpy Show, as the series did not feel right on Nickelodeon and would have likely found greater success elsewhere. This never happened, and instead Nickelodeon buried the show with ever-changing time slots, which further hurt its ratings.

Invader Zim premiered on March 30, 2001, and contains 20 episodes in its first season. At the beginning of the series, new episodes of Invader Zim were aired on Friday nights usually at 9:00PM (ET/PT). In August 2001, Nickelodeon officially renewed the series for a second season, which was originally planned to consist of 20 episodes.

Invader Zim's Friday night time slot ceased with the episode "Door to Door", which was originally scheduled to premiere on September 14, 2001. But after the attacks of 9/11, three days prior, "Door to Door" and its paired episode "FBI Warning of Doom" ended up getting abruptly pulled from Nickelodeon's schedule and pushed back over six months to March 2002. This was partly because "Door to Door" contained a violent scene which resembled the attacks of 9/11, which now needed to be cut and re-done, but also due to the "blanket fears that anything remotely violent would be received as being in poor taste", given the atmosphere and condition of the country at the time. Invader Zim suffered creatively after 9/11, and Nickelodeon began frequently and inconveniently changing the show's time slots, with little promotion for new episodes, which led to an even further drop in ratings and viewership.

The uncut version of "Door to Door" was accidentally aired on Nickelodeon on March 29, 2002, the episode's first airing. All subsequent airings of "Door to Door" were of the cut version.

Online petitions [to bring the show back] went up everywhere, and people rallied for the return of [Invader Zim], and those followings have become stronger over time, especially with the advent of the Internet." — Tim Jones from The Daily Collegian

In January 2002, Nickelodeon announced plans to cancel the series. Upon hearing this announcement, many fans became outraged at Nickelodeon for scheduling Invader Zim for poor and frequently changing time slots towards the end of its run and for not providing the show with a good amount of promotional attention compared to some of their other shows at the time. Almost immediately after the announcement was made, fans launched an online petition to try to change Nickelodeon's mind or get the show picked up by a different network, and even though the petition collected over 55,000 signatures by April 2002, it was not enough to prevent Nickelodeon from canceling the show.

The episode "The Most Horrible X-Mas Ever" was broadcast out of order, as evidenced by the new character Minimoose, who did not receive a proper introduction. Minimoose's introductory episode is called "Nubs of Doom" and was originally intended to air before "The Most Horrible X-Mas Ever", but because Nickelodeon was planning on canceling the series, the show's staff had to pick and choose their final episodes very carefully and Jhonen Vasquez said he was more excited for "The Most Horrible X-Mas Ever", so that episode was made instead, leaving "Nubs of Doom" unfinished.

The final episode of the series, "The Most Horrible X-Mas Ever", premiered on Nickelodeon on December 10, 2002. The show finished with 27 of its initially contracted 40 episodes, leaving at least 17 episodes unfinished. Concept art, scripts, voice recordings, storyboards, and animatics for some of these unfinished episodes can be found in the special features of some of the DVDs or online. Six of the completed second-season episodes initially went unreleased. These episodes would first appear on DVD in 2004 and later made their television debut on Nicktoons from June 10 to August 19, 2006.

On December 24, 2011, the series' pilot made its television debut on Nicktoons (it had previously only been seen on DVD) after an eight-hour marathon and followed by the result of Nicktoons' "Girreatest Zim Moments" online poll.

Reruns of Invader Zim have been airing on Nicktoons since the channel's launch on May 1, 2002. The series premiered on NickSplat for the first time on January 2, 2019, with a seven-hour marathon before returning nightly as of January 7, 2020.

Both seasons of Invader Zim are available for download on the Xbox Live Marketplace and PlayStation Store. In addition, the entire series is available for purchase on Vudu, Google Play, YouTube, and iTunes. The entire series is also available for streaming on Amazon Video and Paramount+.

== Reception and legacy ==
=== Critical reception ===
There really aren't any attempts to be subtle with the material. It is flat-out disgusting at times, and that's what makes it shine. The truly random and dark humor of Invader Zim was too unique to be copied, but a nice representation of the kinds of programming seen at the time, with shows like Rocko's Modern Life and Are You Afraid of the Dark? pushing the boundaries of what was considered acceptable children's television. From Zim growing a massive pimple with hypnotic powers, to the class pet hamster, Peepi, evolving into a colossal beast known as "Ultra Peepi", to the glorious introduction of Mini Moose, the show had enough originality to last it a decade.

— Tim Jones from The Daily Collegian

Screen Rant's Spencer Coriaty wrote: "Backed by some of the most cutting-edge animation at the time, and still breathtaking by today's standards, Invader Zim is like a Mystery Science Theater fan's dream come true. It seamlessly blends sci-fi, action, and comedy into one twisted and hilarious cartoon with superb voice acting and visionary direction." Kristy Punchko from Nerdist praised the series' satirical themes and how it "relished in weird, pushed boundaries, and dared to be unapologetically stupid". Punchko also offered praise for the humor in Invader Zim, saying: "Colliding the sublimely silly with the cerebral, Invader Zim played as seminal precursor to subversive sci-fi shows like Rick and Morty." Becca James, writing for The A.V. Club said, "Invader Zim was destined for a cult following. From its seemingly bizarre nature to its too-early demise, [Invader Zim] brought a darker form of entertainment to [Nickelodeon and] welcomed critical acclaim for straddling the line between child and adult entertainment [and the] constant depiction of Earth as a complete [expletive] only adds to this dingy, but delightful program."

There were some elementary schoolers who fell hard and fast for [Invader Zim], while their older siblings — or parents — found a reason to tune into Nickelodeon again.

— Allegra Frank

Allegra Frank from Polygon said:

[The series is laid out] in a story-focused half-hour unlike anything ever aired on Nickelodeon previously. Invader Zim had a villain at its center, years before Breaking Bad and Mad Men popularized that dramatic convention for adult audiences. As a character, Zim was mostly unlikable; the show's color palette was narrow and unfriendly, and the entire design of the series — interiors covered in grime, streets covered in garbage, on-screen televisions full of screaming ads — dared viewers to be turned off. While jokes could easily revolve around the high-pitched screams of Zim's useless robot companion, GIR, the comedy was also often derived from much darker places, like harvesting organs from living children and lice outbreaks and characters slowly turning into a sentient [bologna]. Dib wanted to kill Zim, after all; that's not usually the subject of children's TV.

Sam Thielman from The Guardian said, "[Invader Zim]'s sense of humor is somehow dark without being bleak; even when the show takes its cues from horror movies it's often quite scary, but it's somehow never too much. [...] Invader Zim didn't last nearly long enough, but it did spawn a cult following almost immediately and became a password for alienated millennials and teenagers everywhere." Alex Bedder, from NYU Local, said, "Essentially the black sheep of the animated Nickelodeon family, Invader Zim never quite stuck its landing, but it became a beloved and off-kilter fan favorite. [...] There are random, twitchy characters, the word 'doom' is overused, and there are countless other illogical outbursts. But the common thread weaving all of the madness together is its original, sick, and sometimes oddly-intelligent sense of humor." In an article he wrote for Cartoon Brew, animation historian Jerry Beck said: "I always thought highly of [Invader Zim], but watching it again this weekend reminded me how good it truly was. [...] I laugh long and hard at incidents, situations and visuals on [Invader Zim], and if there is any justice it should be ranked alongside the likes of South Park and The Simpsons."

Mary Grace Garis from Bustle praised Invader Zim for how it does not sugarcoat reality, saying, "You can't deny that [Invader Zim] really put in some heavy, soul-crushing messages between 'The Doom Song' and all those rubber piggies. And I'd say that à la The Powerpuff Girls, they did a really good job of hiding adult lessons in a children's cartoon, but well... I'm pretty sure they were a bit more blatant in delivering the news that we were all doomed." Kayla Cobb of Decider said, "If you prefer your humor to be equal parts dark and random, then it's time to re-watch this short-lived Nicktoon. [Invader Zim] can best be characterized by its sarcasm, cruelty, and violence. This is a show that creates a disturbing giant-monster-baby fusion in one episode and labels the ultimate face of horror as a room with a moose the next. So yeah. It's kind of all over the place, which is why we love it." Lana Berkowitz from the Houston Chronicle praised Invader Zim's art-style and color palette saying, "The series has an appropriately gloomy look of impending doom colored with dark reds and black, and a dash of alien green. The animation's angular look and the characters' big, expressive eyes give Invader Zim a distinctive look."

Variety's Steven Oxman wrote, "[Invader Zim] captures a nice blend of the innocent and the satirical", further stating that "the artwork [in the show] isn't especially original but still manages to create a nicely off-center vision of Earth and its inhabitants. Vasquez and co-writer Rob Hummel throw in some clever quips at life on this planet, taking aim particularly at the doomsaying schoolteacher, Ms. Bitters, [and] Kevin Manthei's music provides strong accompaniment to the escapades." Sean Fitz-Gerald from Thrillist wrote: "Though Invader Zim came from Jhonen Vasquez, the same beautifully twisted mind behind Johnny the Homicidal Maniac, the [show] manages to hold off on graphic violence and obscenities without losing all its bite. The spastic [Zim], along with the world around him, capitalizes on cheeky, masochistic, and random humor in ways viewers of all ages can appreciate." Joe Matar, writing for Den of Geek, wrote: "Invader Zim is a brilliant piece of unsettling, grotesque horror, with a heart of goofiness, which is a big part of its appeal. [...] The incorporation of cel-shaded CGI and lots of sharp geometric shapes actually enhanced the look [of the show] rather than came off as a cheap shortcut." Andy Patrizio of IGN praised the colors and the CGI imagery in Invader Zim, but criticized how Zim is "always shrieking and yelling at the top of his lungs" and the inconsistencies between episodes, but added "When the show hits, it hits big."

George Dvorsky, from io9, specifically praised the character GIR, saying, "Science fiction has portrayed its fair share of glitchy and bumbling robots over the years, but none hold a candle to Invader Zim's GIR. Quite possibly the most erratic and unhelpful robot to ever hit the screen, GIR has become one of the most loved and often quoted characters to appear in a sci-fi cartoon in years." Lynne Heffley, writing for Los Angeles Times, said "The deliriously original Invader Zim rocks" offering praise for the show's humor and art-style, calling it a "visual feast of geometric lines, strange angles, vaulting curves, fantastic, transforming machines and odd, shadowed places." Sean Aitchison from CBR said, "Invader Zim not only holds up incredibly well, it also feels like it was rather ahead of its time and maybe it would have lasted longer today. [...] The weird humor, the eccentric characters and even the premise all feel like a show that would have easily gotten green-lit in the modern cartoon renaissance that began with Adventure Time. The show only ran for two seasons, which makes it such a shame when you realize how much it would have thrived in modern times." On the review aggregator website Rotten Tomatoes, Invader Zim currently holds a 100% approval rating based on 13 reviews. The website's critical consensus for season one reads: "The right balance of dark humor and spastic earnestness make Invader Zim a creepy kid's cartoon worthy of its cult following."

The now-defunct magazine Christian Parenting Today negatively criticized Invader Zim in their May 2001 issue, written by Jennifer Mangan, calling the show "non-Christian", "immoral", "offensive", "blasphemous", "unsuitable for Christian children" and "insulting towards Christian values and beliefs" due to the show's dark nature and negative characters like Gaz and Ms. Bitters, among other complaints. Common Sense Media's Andrea Graham wrote more negatively of Invader Zim, praising the show's "laugh-out-loud" humor, but criticizing the way that Zim has a complete lack of concern for all life, how humans are depicted as less-than-intelligent life forms, how human society is depicted as a terrible disgusting place, the very frequent use of verbal insults, and that there is no good messages or good role models in the show. Some parents have criticized Invader Zim for its pessimistic portrayal of humanity, the near constant-level of screaming among the characters, as well as the large amounts of verbal insults and threats, and the disturbing and disgusting content, calling it "unnecessary", "misanthropic", "too scary for children" and "inappropriate for children." According to director Steve Ressel, Nickelodeon held a test screening for the episode "Dark Harvest" during which one kid ran out of the room crying before the episode was over and others were visibly shaken and clearly terrified at what they saw.

In 2006, IGN ranked Invader Zim at number 22 on their list of the Top 25 Primetime Animated Series of All Time and in 2009, IGN ranked Invader Zim at number 57 on their list of the Top 100 Animated Series. In 2016, Entertainment Weekly ranked Zim as the 18th Most Memorable Nickelodeon Character. That same year, Screen Rant ranked Invader Zim at number 9 on their list of the 25 Best Nickelodeon Shows and The Guardian ranked Invader Zim as the third Best Nickelodeon Cartoon. In 2017, CBR ranked Invader Zim at number 5 on their list titled, 15 Incredible Cartoons That Were Canceled For No Good Reason. In 2018, Paste Magazine ranked Invader Zim at number 60 on their list of The 100 Best Sci-Fi Shows of All Time. In 2018, IGN included the episode "The Most Horrible X-Mas Ever" on their list titled, 10 of the Best Holiday TV Episodes Ever.

=== Ratings ===
Invader Zim garnered decent ratings for its premiere episode, with a 6.0 rating/17 share (about 1.8 million views) among kids ages 2–11. As the show went on, ratings and viewership began to decline amongst Nickelodeon's target audience of 2–11 year olds.

While Invader Zim was popular during its original run, Nickelodeon did not think the show was doing well because it was focusing only on a certain age group: 2–11-year-olds. Even though Invader Zim was praised by critics and popular with viewers ages 14–18, the ratings amongst Nickelodeon's core demographic were just not high enough for the network to justify the expenses being put into the show, as Invader Zim was the most expensive show they were producing at the time. When Nickelodeon saw that some of their other shows with half the budget of Invader Zim were getting double the desired ratings amongst the 2–11 year old demographic, canceling the show just seemed to be the logical thing to do from a business perspective.

Despite the poor ratings the show received during its original run, reruns of Invader Zim tend to receive average to above-average views and ratings. In March through July 2010, reruns of Invader Zim were aired on Nicktoons. These reruns became the second highest-rated show on the network, behind Avatar: The Last Airbender.

=== Awards and nominations ===
Year	Award	Category	Nominee(s)	Result	Ref.
2001	53rd Primetime Emmy Awards	Outstanding Individual Achievement in Animation	Kyle Menke (Storyboard Artist) for "The Nightmare Begins"	Won	
2001	29th Annie Awards	Outstanding Achievement in a Primetime or Late Night Animated Television Production	Nickelodeon Animation Studio for Invader Zim	Nominated	
2001	29th Annie Awards	Outstanding Individual Achievement for Storyboarding in an Animated Television Production	Steve Ressel for "The Nightmare Begins"	Won	
2001	29th Annie Awards	Outstanding Individual Achievement for Music Score in an Animated Television Production	Kevin Manthei	Nominated	
2001	29th Annie Awards	Outstanding Individual Achievement for Production Design in an Animated Television Production	Jhonen Vasquez	Nominated	
2001	29th Annie Awards	Outstanding Individual Achievement for Directing in an Animated Television Production	Steve Ressel for "Dark Harvest"	Nominated	
2001	29th Annie Awards	Outstanding Individual Achievement for Voice Acting by a Male Performer in an Animated Television Production	Richard Horvitz as Zim	Nominated	
2001	World Animation Celebration Awards	Best Title Sequence	Jhonen Vasquez, Steve Ressel, Mary Harrington	Won	
2002	30th Annie Awards	Best Animated Television Production	Invader Zim	Nominated	
2002	49th Golden Reel Awards	Best Sound Editing in Television Animation	Invader Zim	Nominated	
2020	47th Annie Awards	Best Voice Acting in an Animated Feature Production	Richard Horvitz as Zim in Invader Zim: Enter the Florpus	Nominated	
2020	67th Golden Reel Awards	Outstanding Achievement in Sound Editing – Non-Theatrical Animation Long Form	Invader Zim: Enter the Florpus	Nominated	

=== InvaderCON ===
Invader Zim has its own fan convention known as InvaderCON, run by Wasabi Anime (also known as "Green Mustard Entertainment"). The initial event was created to celebrate the ten-year anniversary of Invader Zim and took place in Atlanta, Georgia on March 26–27, 2011. (The convention's date was set exactly ten years, to the weekend, from when the show first premiered: March 30, 2001.) Special guests included cast members Richard Steven Horvitz, Melissa Fahn, Rosearik Rikki Simons, Andy Berman and writer Eric Trueheart. The convention had over a thousand in attendance and featured many Invader Zim-related panels and activities; including a panel where the voice cast read the scripts for the unfinished episodes "Mopiness of Doom" and "Day of da Spookies". One dollar of each ticket purchased for InvaderCON was donated to the Juvenile Diabetes Research Foundation (JDRF). The choice of charity was selected by Richard Horvitz, who was one of the first guests to be booked. In the end, InvaderCON raised almost $2,000 for JDRF. InvaderCON was not endorsed, sanctioned or in any other way supported, directly or indirectly, by Viacom International, Inc. or Nickelodeon. But it was confirmed that a few representatives of Nickelodeon attended to observe the turnout and were quoted as being "overwhelmed".

InvaderCON was originally intended to be a one time event, but due to the success of the first InvaderCON and demand from fans, an encore presentation of the convention, InvaderCON II: DOOMCON, took place on July 28–29, 2012, in Los Angeles, California, featuring all of the previous year's guests (except for Andy Berman) with the addition of series creator Jhonen Vasquez, character designer Aaron Alexovich, voice of Professor Membrane Rodger Bumpass, post-production supervisor Jason Stiff, storyboard artist Ian Graham and a surprise appearance from voice of Almighty Tallest Red Wally Wingert. During this convention there was a panel where the voice cast read the script for the unfinished episode "The Trial".

According to InvaderCON's official website:

Since the first InvaderCON was on the East Coast (Atlanta) and due to travel requests on Jhonen's part, we opted to host InvaderCON II: DOOMCON in California. This was a MASSIVE undertaking on our part since our production team is based in Florida and Georgia. We made it happen, though. Over 1,000 fans from 42 different states and 7 countries showed up near Los Angeles for two days of Invader ZIM fandom goodness. The show was an expensive risk and a major stress on the Green Mustard Entertainment team – but it was worth it for us to see the fans and families that all appeared to share in the experience. Autographs, panels, breakfast, dinner, puppets, surprise guests, and more added up to a once in a lifetime weekend for the cast, crew, and attendees.

With over 10,000 fans on Facebook asking for another InvaderCON, Wasabi Anime decided to do InvaderCON "one last time". The third InvaderCON was funded via Kickstarter on June 21 – July 21, 2013. The Kickstarter was a success and exceeded its initial goal of $33,333. Wasabi Anime said they wanted the third InvaderCON to be located "in the middle" of where the previous InvaderCONs were located. Thus, Austin, Texas was chosen as its location since it is approximately 1,000 miles from Atlanta (InvaderCON 2011) and 1,300 miles from Los Angeles (InvaderCON 2012.) InvaderCON III: FINAL DOOM took place on July 26–27, 2014 in Austin, Texas. Special guests included cast members Richard Steven Horvitz, Melissa Fahn, Rosearik Rikki Simons, Rodger Bumpass and writer Eric Trueheart. At this convention there was a panel where the voice cast read the script for the unfinished episode "Ten Minutes to Doom".

Even though InvaderCON III: FINAL DOOM was originally intended to be the last InvaderCON, fans, as well as Wasabi Anime, continued to express interest in doing another InvaderCON. In the years following InvaderCON III: FINAL DOOM, the founder of Wasabi Anime, Tom Croom, repeatedly teased fans on Twitter with the possibilities of another InvaderCON on multiple different occasions.

On August 16, 2019, Wasabi Anime launched a Kickstarter to test the waters for a potential fourth InvaderCON event. The Kickstarter reached its $2,500 goal in just four days. In February 2020, it was officially announced that there would be a fourth InvaderCON event which was originally scheduled to take place in Boston, Massachusetts on August 7–9, 2020, as part of Fan Expo Boston. Due to the COVID-19 pandemic, it was postponed to August 6–8, 2021, along with Fan Expo Boston. The fourth InvaderCon event was later postponed again indefinitely. On March 30, 2021, InvaderCON hosted a Twitch livestream celebrating the twentieth anniversary of Invader Zim. It featured Richard Horvitz, Rikki Simons, Rodger Bumpass, Melissa Fahn, Olivia d'Abo, Wally Wingert, Aaron Alexovich, Eric Trueheart and Kevin Manthei. On November 13, 2021, Wasabi Anime revealed that they no longer have any plans for another InvaderCON event in the near future, but remain open to the possibilities of another convention.

InvaderCON, unlike some other projects done by Wasabi Anime (such as Florida Anime Experience), is not an annual show done in a city near where Wasabi Anime is located. InvaderCON's attendees at all three conventions were only about 20% locals. Over 80% of InvaderCON attendees came from outside the convention's host state. This made predicting attendance and budgeting for InvaderCON "very tricky and extremely risky" according to Wasabi Anime.

=== Influence ===
Bryan Konietzko, the co-creator of the Nickelodeon animated series Avatar: The Last Airbender, was a storyboard artist and art director on Invader Zim. Konietzko has said that the character of Aang was inspired by a drawing of an adult character he had originally designed while working on Invader Zim. When Konietzko first redesigned the character as Aang for Avatar: The Last Airbender he left visible "traces of Jhonen Vasquez's idiosyncratic style in the character's poses."

Rebecca Sugar, the creator of the Cartoon Network animated series Steven Universe, is a fan of Invader Zim and has admitted to reading and writing fan fiction and drawing fan art for Invader Zim when she was a teenager. Sugar has said, "I owe a whole lot to Jhonen Vasquez. His show Invader Zim was my gateway drug to the independent comic world. [...] Someday I hope to meet [Jhonen Vasquez] and thank him for changing my life." Additionally, Sugar provided the foreword for The Art of Invader Zim, in which she further discussed the positive impact the show has had on her life and career.

Vivienne "VivziePop" Medrano, the creator of Hazbin Hotel and Helluva Boss, is a fan of Invader Zim and has gone on to say that Invader Zim had a "huge influence" on her and her work.

In 2018, Wally Wingert, the voice of Almighty Tallest Red, noted during an interview with Den of Geek that "[T]he reason other shows like Adventure Time are [able to do some pretty intense stuff] is because the trail was blazed by [Jhonen Vasquez]. When Invader Zim came out, [the intense stuff we did on the show] was the new barometer by which you could get away with something. Up until then, all the other cartoons were relatively tame, but now you're seeing way darker stuff [in cartoons] than we ever did on Zim."

In 2019, Screen Rant's Maddy Cohen observed that "[A]rguably, Invader Zim is one of the most influential animated shows to come out of [the early 2000s], with echoes of its humor and tone present in Adventure Time, Regular Show, Gravity Falls, and Steven Universe." That same year, Eric Vilas-Boas from Thrillist wrote "[Invader Zim] remained an influential cult classic, informing future cartoons like Avatar: The Last Airbender all the way up to Steven Universe, Gravity Falls, Rick and Morty, and beyond."

=== Controversy ===
Invader Zim became a controversial series when the show was mentioned at Scott Dyleski's murder trial in 2006. Dyleski, who was 17 at the time of the trial, was convicted of murdering his neighbor, and cited the Invader Zim episode "Dark Harvest" as his motivation for committing the murder. Dyleski said that after watching "Dark Harvest", he became fascinated with collecting body parts and curious as to how the human body would function without certain organs, which inspired the murder—although the people who defended Dyleski said these comments were made in jest.

== Related media ==
=== Netflix film ===
On November 8, 2016, Harvey Beaks and Chowder creator C. H. Greenblatt was asked by a fan on Tumblr if he would work with Jhonen Vasquez on an hypothetical Invader Zim movie, and Greenblatt responded, "Jhonen IS making an Invader Zim movie for Nick. I'm not a part of it, but I'm excited." However, Vasquez initially denied this on his Twitter, most likely because he was under contract to not say anything at the time and was forced to dismiss it as a rumor.

On April 4, 2017, over sixteen years since the series' debut and eleven years since the last unaired episode premiered in the United States, Nickelodeon officially announced that they had green-lit a 71-minute television film based on the series with three teaser trailers being released in a span of the following four days. Vasquez returned as executive producer and as the voice of Zim's computer, along with Kevin Manthei as the composer and Jenny Goldberg, who worked on the Invader Zim comic book series, as the art director for the movie. Most of the cast members from the television series reprised their roles in the movie including: Richard Steven Horvitz as Zim, Rosearik Rikki Simons as GIR, Andy Berman as Dib, Melissa Fahn as Gaz, Wally Wingert as Almighty Tallest Red, Kevin McDonald as Almighty Tallest Purple, Rodger Bumpass as Professor Membrane, Olivia d'Abo as Tak and Paul Greenberg as Poonchy.

At San Diego Comic-Con 2018, Jhonen Vasquez explained that Nickelodeon had been asking him about doing more Invader Zim for years but he had to decline their offers, either because he was busy working on something else or unable to come to an agreement with Nickelodeon on a budget for an Invader Zim revival. But being completely miserable with the other things he was working on at the time, Vasquez accepted Nickelodeon's latest offer to do more Invader Zim. Nickelodeon initially wanted a new Invader Zim television series, but Vasquez suggested a six-episode miniseries instead. He soon changed his mind to a television movie, since doing a movie would be "infinitely less stressful".

Invader Zim: Enter the Florpus had a panel at San Diego Comic-Con on July 20, 2018. During the panel, some never before seen production art such as backgrounds and turn-around charts for the movie were revealed. A trailer put together out of unedited first take animation for the movie was also shown at the panel accompanied by some original music composed for the trailer by Kevin Manthei. During the panel, Vasquez explained that he put the trailer together out of some random animated footage he had for the movie that he thought looked presentable enough to show people and that most of the shots used in the trailer were going to be sent back overseas to be re-animated. Vasquez also revealed that they had written the movie in 2015 and that at the time of the panel, they were currently in the process of getting first take animation back from their overseas animation team, Maven Animation Studios, in South Korea.

On May 10, 2019, Viacom president Robert Bakish revealed in a conference call that Netflix has acquired the distribution rights to Invader Zim: Enter the Florpus. The movie was released on Netflix on August 16, 2019.

=== Video games ===
Invader Zim has yet to have a stand-alone video game release, but has been featured in several Nickelodeon-related video games.

The 2002 game Nickelodeon Party Blast includes Zim as a playable character in every version of the game. There are also multiple Invader Zim-themed stages in Nickelodeon Party Blast, including a level in which the player competes against Dib and Gaz. Although they are not playable characters, GIR can be seen in the background of several levels and Almighty Tallest Purple is shown in the background of the level where the player competes against Dib and Gaz.

In the 2004 Game Boy Advance-exclusive game Nicktoons: Freeze Frame Frenzy, the final stage of the game takes place on Zim's ship and Zim and GIR are the final boss of the game, but Zim becomes a playable character once the photo album is complete. Additionally, GIR, Dib, Gaz, Keef, Dirge, Ms. Bitters (mistakenly called "Mr. Bitters") and Bill the Paranormal Investigator (mistakenly called "Prof. Membrane") appear in the photo album as well as in the background of various levels throughout the game.

Zim's Voot Cruiser and house can be seen briefly in different worlds in the console versions of the 2006 game Nicktoons: Battle for Volcano Island.

In the console versions of the 2007 game Nicktoons: Attack of the Toybots, the EvilToyCo Factory, Zone 3 (Part 2) and the Master Model Chamber are Irken-themed. Additionally, GIR appears in the game as a Master Model (unlockable) and becomes a playable character once he is rescued. Both Zim and GIR are unlockable and playable characters in the Nintendo DS version of Nicktoons: Attack of the Toybots, although there are no Invader Zim-themed levels in this version of the game.

Both Zim and Dib are playable characters in every version of the 2008 game, SpongeBob SquarePants Featuring Nicktoons: Globs of Doom. In the PlayStation 2 and Wii versions of the game, the second world is modeled after and called Zim's Town, and the boss battle of the world takes place inside Zim's house and is against GIR. In the Nintendo DS version of the game, the fifth world takes place on Zim's space station and the boss battle of the world is against The Almighty Tallest.

The 2008 game, Nicktoons: Android Invasion, exclusively released on the educational Didj platform, is set entirely inside Zim's base. Zim is the final boss in the game and several other characters from the series make appearances throughout the game.

The 2008 arcade-exclusive game Nicktoons Nitro includes Zim as a playable character in his Voot Cruiser, and there is a race course called "Irken City".

Zim and Gaz are playable characters in every version of the 2011 game Nicktoons MLB. GIR appears in the game as one of the announcers, and there is a ballpark called "Irken Field". Other characters from the show appear in the game as cameos when the game is loading and on the character cards.

Zim and GIR are playable characters in the 2019 official mobile game Nickelodeon Super Brawl Universe. There is also a location in the game set inside Zim's base and an Invader Zim themed challenge called "Doomsday Challenge".

Invader Zim characters and locations are included in the racing game, Nickelodeon Kart Racers 2: Grand Prix, released on October 6, 2020, for PlayStation 4, Xbox One, and Nintendo Switch, and released on December 1, 2020, for Microsoft Windows.

Zim is a playable character in the fighting game Nickelodeon All-Star Brawl released on October 5, 2021, for PlayStation 4, PlayStation 5, Xbox One, Xbox Series X/S, Nintendo Switch, and Microsoft Windows.

Zim is a playable character in the mobile game, Nickelodeon Extreme Tennis released on January 21, 2022, exclusively on Apple Arcade. Zim's secret base is also a location in the game.

Zim, alongside Rocko, Danny Phantom, Jenny XJ9, and Powdered Toast Man, were released as playable skins for a limited-time Nickelodeon-themed event in Smite on July 12, 2022. The crossover attracted criticism for its decision to replace Richard Horvitz as the voice of Zim, with Horvitz himself calling the decision "offensive" and "disrespectful."

=== Podcasts ===
There are two episodes of the Nickelodeon Animation Podcast that primarily discuss Invader Zim. The first one is season one episode fourteen, an interview with series creator Jhonen Vasquez, which was released on August 12, 2016. The second one is season two episode twenty-seven, an interview with the Invader Zim cast, which was released on January 6, 2017. Both episodes are available on YouTube, iTunes and SoundCloud.

The complete Invader Zim series was covered on "Wizard and the Bruiser" on February 21, 2019.

=== Comic book series ===
I'm always confused when people say how much they miss Invader Zim because the show never stopped running in my head, and then I remember everyone else isn't in my head. I try to imagine the world for all those people who don't know what Zim's been up to since the show went off the air and it makes me shudder. How can people live that way? Hopefully this comic helps make the world a better place. — Jhonen Vasquez

On February 20, 2015, American publishing company Oni Press announced that they would be releasing an official comic book series based on Invader Zim, in collaboration with Jhonen Vasquez and Nickelodeon. A pre-issue 0 was released on May 23, 2015, as a zine and foreshadow to the comic book series. The first issue was released on July 8, 2015, and since then most issues were released on a monthly basis.

On February 11, 2020, it was announced that the monthly Invader Zim comic would end with issue #50, which was released in March 2020, and a new comic series titled Invader Zim Quarterly would begin in June 2020, releasing on a quarterly schedule. Additionally, in July 2020, Oni Press launched a new "Best of..." trade paperback collections, which collected a selection of stories from Oni Press's monthly Invader Zim comic series.

On June 27, 2026, it was announced that Boom! Studios had acquired the license to Invader Zim comics. Boom Studios will also reprint the Oni Press comics.

=== Other literature ===
Invader Zim made appearances in Nickelodeon Magazine between 2001 and 2008, which include Invader Zim trivia, exclusive interviews, and an official four-page comic titled Invader Zim: Quick! Run While You Still Have Your Insides!!! by Jhonen Vasquez.

A book titled Not Just Cartoons: Nicktoons! was published on October 29, 2007, and written by animation historian Jerry Beck. The book collects more than five hundred illustrations, images, storyboards, concept art, quotes, interviews and anecdotes, among other special behind-the-scenes content for Nickelodeon's first thirty-one cartoons. Not Just Cartoons: Nicktoons! contains a short chapter about Invader Zim, featuring some storyboards, images, illustrations, turn-around charts, character model sheets and short, exclusive interviews with series creator Jhonen Vasquez, executive producer Mary Harrington and head writer Frank Conniff.

An official art book titled The Art of Invader Zim was released on July 28, 2020. Published by Abrams Books and written and designed by Chris McDonnell, The Art of Invader Zim contains the production history of the original Invader Zim television series, the Invader Zim comic book series, and the television movie Invader Zim: Enter the Florpus. It offers a compendium of never-before-published production art, storyboards, behind-the-scenes photos, and ephemera. The art book also features exclusive interviews with Jhonen Vasquez and other key crewmembers that show the origins, art, and ideas behind the Invader Zim franchise.

Series writer Eric Trueheart wrote a book titled The Medium-Sized Book of Zim Scripts, Vol. 1: Pigs 'n' Waffles – The Stories, and the Stories Behind the Stories of your Favorite Invader, which was released digitally on April 2, 2020, and a paperback version was released on July 27, 2020. The book collects the original scripts from the episodes "Bad, Bad Rubber Piggy", "Hamstergeddon", "GIR Goes Crazy and Stuff", "Zim Eats Waffles", "Mortos der Soulstealer" and the unfinished episode "Pants!", which was later adapted into an issue of the Invader Zim comic book series. The book also contains commentary on the writing process of Invader Zim.

=== Theme park ride ===
There is an Invader Zim theme park ride at American Dream's Nickelodeon Universe called Invader Zim's Flip & Spin... OF DOOM! which opened on October 25, 2019, along with the park. The ride is a bumper cars style attraction made by Amusement Products LLC where riders can spin and flip upside down on impact. The official summary of the ride states "You've been recruited for battle onboard Irk's latest militarized spacecraft. Help Zim's invasion as you flip, spin and bump into poor, unsuspecting humans."

=== References in other media ===
Zim and GIR flying in the Voot Cruiser made a cameo appearance in the now-defunct simulator ride Jimmy Neutron's Nicktoon Blast at Universal Studios Florida.

In the 2013 animated feature film Escape from Planet Earth, the word "Zim" can be seen written on the floor in graffiti in one brief scene, along with the names of multiple other aliens from various different movies and television shows.

Invader Zim was featured as a clue on the July 29, 2013, episode of Jeopardy!. The clue was for $2000 under the category "What a Character!" and it read "Irk is the home planet of this title 'invader.'" None of the contestants were able to answer the question correctly.

Ms. Bitters made a cameo appearance in the Nickelodeon animated series The Loud House during the episode "Linc or Swim", alongside several other elderly characters from other Nicktoons series.

In the 2016 short film TMNT: Don vs Raph, which was written by Jhonen Vasquez, a picture of Zim is seen on the side of a building. A poster for "Bloaty's Pizza Hog" can also be seen on the wall during the cooking segment.

Questions about Invader Zim have been featured in several episodes of the 2021 game show Tooned In.

Invader Zim comic books and cardboard cutouts were shown in the background of the 2022 Nickelodeon series Warped!.

Childish Gambino references Invader Zim in his 2011 song "Bonfire".

== Merchandise ==
=== Home video ===
On October 13, 2003, Media Blasters announced that they were planning on releasing DVD collections of Invader Zim through their Anime Works imprint. They released the first volume titled Doom Doom Doom on May 11, 2004. On August 31, 2004, volume two titled Progressive Stupidity was released and on October 12, 2004, volume three titled Horrible Holiday Cheer was released, completing the series' initial DVD release. All three volumes contain animatics, Irken subtitles and digitally restored and remastered picture and sound. They also include audio commentaries for the majority of episodes, exclusive interviews with the voice actors, writers, and the post production staff and the series pilot. A box set shaped like Zim's house, known as the House Box Set has also been released, which includes all three volumes, plus an extra disc for bonus features, which includes the uncut version of "The Most Horrible X-Mas Ever", voice recordings for seven of the unfinished episodes, interviews with Kevin Manthei on the sound design and music of Invader Zim, and a soundtrack of Kevin Manthei's main compositions for the show. Originally, this set included a duty-mode "GIR" figurine in the roof compartment of the box set, but Media Blasters silently stopped including it with the termination of Palisades Toys, the company that had been producing Invader Zim figurines. Another DVD box set for Invader Zim called the Complete Invasion Box Set was released in 2006, featuring all three of the DVD volumes boxed together, with the art of Volume One on the cover. This box set does not contain an extra disc for bonus features like the House Box Set included. In 2004, Media Blasters also released two Invader Zim MiniDVDs, each containing one episode.

On May 4, 2010, the complete Season 1 of Invader Zim was released on DVD via manufacture on demand in a DVD-R format. A Season 2 DVD was released in that same format on April 2, 2010. Neither of these DVDs contain audio commentaries or special features.

On February 22, 2011, an Invader Zim DVD was released called Operation Doom. This DVD contains the eight highest-rated episodes that reran on the Nicktoons Network throughout 2010.

Episodes of Invader Zim have been featured in several Nickelodeon compilation DVDs. This includes Nickstravaganza! 2, which was released on September 2, 2003, and contains the episode "The Nightmare Begins". (Nickstravaganza! 2 was also released in a VHS format which contains the exact same contents as the DVD version.) A DVD titled Classic Nickelodeon Halloween Specials, which was released on October 1, 2015, contains the episode "Halloween Spectacular of Spooky Doom". The episode "The Most Horrible X-Mas Ever" was featured in a DVD called A Very Nickelodeon Christmas, which was released on November 4, 2015.

=== Figurines and toys ===
Series two of the Invader Zim figures produced by Palisades Toys

Two series of collectible Invader Zim articulated figurines were produced by the company Palisades Toys and released from 2004 to 2006. A third series was planned, but was not made because Palisades Toys, the manufacturer, ceased operations in early 2006. A multitude of other collectible Invader Zim figurines were produced before the termination of Palisades Toys.

Multiple official Plushies were made to promote the Invader Zim series.

Funko has released many Pop! Vinyl figures of GIR in several variations. These are usually sold as Hot Topic exclusives. A Pop! Vinyl figure of Zim with Minimoose was released as a San Diego Comic-Con 2020 exclusive.

In 2015, a company called Ikon Collectables released an officially licensed 9-inch tall limited edition statue of GIR on the pig.

In 2016, Zag Toys released some officially licensed Invader Zim Original Minis and Plush Clip-Ons.

In 2017, Vision Toys released some officially licensed laser cut 3D keychains of some Invader Zim characters.

In 2018, Diamond Select Toys released some Vinimates figurines. All four of these figurines were released as Hot Topic exclusives and limited to 1,000 units each. Another set of Invader Zim Vinimates called Extra Doom Edition was released as a San Diego Comic-Con 2019 exclusive and limited to 250 units.

FOCO released some Eekeez figurines that were exclusively available at New York Comic Con in 2018. FOCO also released some Eekeez figurines variants that were exclusively available at San Diego Comic Con in 2018. An Eekeez figurine metallic variant of GIR was released as an WonderCon 2019 exclusive. An Eekeez figurine metallic variant of Zim was released as an Emerald City Comic Con 2019 exclusive and limited to 300 units.

In 2020, Hot Topic released some officially licensed rubber Bend-Ems figures of Zim and Dib.

=== Other merchandise ===
Nickelodeon has licensed a multitude of official Invader Zim products including: a wide variety of clothing, fashion accessories, makeup, jewelry, tabletop games, backpacks, bags, home accessories and decorations, office supplies, car accessories, household appliances, novelty items, holiday decorations, hygiene items and more, all commonly sold at stores like Hot Topic, Newbury Comics, Spencer's and other speciality retailers.

Invader Zim merchandise has been included in subscription boxes such as Loot Crate in September 2017 and The Nick Box in fall 2020.

== Revival attempts ==
In March–July 2010, reruns of Invader Zim were aired on Nicktoons. The reruns were the second highest-rated show on the network, and according to Jhonen Vasquez, were part of a plan by the network to see if a revival of the series would be feasible. However, the budget Nickelodeon proposed was not quite big enough for what the crew wanted to do, so they respectfully declined the offer. Vasquez also asserted that, despite the widespread rumor suggesting otherwise, he would have returned to the show again had Nickelodeon not deemed the revival "too expensive" for what the crew wanted to do with it.

In 2011, Nickelodeon approached Rikki Simons, the voice of GIR, about returning to voice GIR for a series of animated shorts. While Simons was open to reprising his role, the shorts were never made. During an Invader Zim panel at Long Beach Comic Con 2019, Simons stated that "It's kinda weird to do GIR by himself. I don't know what that would be."

In May 2026, Jorge R. Gutierrez, the creator of El Tigre: The Adventures of Manny Rivera, revealed that he was in talks with Paramount about a potential revival of the aforementioned series for Paramount+ and expressed interest in having it be a crossover with Invader Zim as well as My Life as a Teenage Robot.
