= Steve Ressel =

American artist, writer, musician (born 1967)

- Born: October 12, 1967 (age 58); Delaware, U.S.
- Occupations: Writer, director, producer, artist, animator, voice actor, musician, songwriter
- Writing career
- Notable works: Rugrats; Duckman; Wild Thornberries; God, the Devil and Bob; Rocket Power; Invader Zim; The Lost ~~Boys~~
- Notable awards: 29th Annual Annie Award; 2001 World Animation Celebration

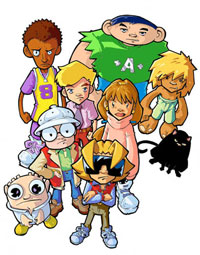
Characters of "The Lost ~~Boys~~".

Steve Ressel (born October 12, 1967) is an American comic book artist, animator, storyboard artist, producer and director. Ressel directed animated series such as Invader Zim, The Wild Thornberrys, Duckman, Stressed Eric, God, the Devil and Bob, Rugrats and others. Ressel directed and produced the entire run of Invader Zim.

After Invader Zim he went on to develop his own ideas. Trubble Bub, a CGI children's program focusing on problem solving and behavior, was animated as a pilot. It was scripted and designed for a direct-to-DVD project but never got off the ground.

== Writing and comics ==
Ressel resides in Clifford, North Dakota.

In his spare time, he writes trance, pop, rock, and country music.

== Grooming allegations ==
In 2020, video essayist and podcaster Shannon Strucci came forward with allegations of having been groomed by Ressel when she was a teenager, sharing on a thread several screenshots of inappropriate messages and art pieces he sent her during that time.

== Bibliography ==
- Animation : The Inner Workings (2010) Textbook. ISBN 978-0-9787483-0-2
- State of One (2010) Novel. ISBN 978-0-9787483-2-6
- Classy Drinks For The Noob (2010) Non-fiction. ISBN 978-0-9787483-6-4
- Ugly Girl (2010) Novella. ISBN 978-0-9787483-3-3
- The Lost ~~Boys~~ (2010) Compilation. ISBN 978-0-9787483-1-9
- Perverted Communion (2010) Novel. ISBN 978-0-9787483-5-7
- Rise Again, Ugly Girl (2011) Novel. ISBN 978-0-9787483-8-8
- Breaking Hooke (2011) Novella. ISBN 978-0-9787483-7-1
- Return, Ugly Girl (2011) Novel. ISBN 978-0-9839544-0-8
- The Complete Ugly Girl (2011) Compilation. ISBN 978-0-9839544-1-5
- Mud World (2013) Gonzo Noir Anthology. ISBN 978-0-9839544-2-2
- Animation Reference (2013) Private reference textbook. ISBN 978-0-9839544-6-0
- Spikey-Sparkle's Singular Sacrosanct Sojourn (2015) Young fiction - Illustrated. ISBN 978-0-9839544-3-9
- The Lost ~~Boys~~ : NutsHell (2016) Graphic novel. ISBN 978-0-9839544-8-4
- The Lost ~~Boys~~ Threads, Knots, Snarls & Snobs (2016) 500pp. comic digest. ISBN 978-0-9839544-4-6
- The Stories in Between: A Between Books Anthology (2010) 4-page comic capping the anthology. ISBN 978-09713608-8-4

== Filmography ==
- Rocko's Modern Life (1993) Storyboard Clean-up. Various episodes.
- WildC.A.T.S. (1994) Storyboards. Various episodes.
- Aaahh!!! Real Monsters (1995) Storyboards. Various episodes.
- Duckman (1995) Director & Storyboards. Various episodes.
- Santo Bugito (1996) Storyboards. Various episodes.
- Jumanji (1996) Director. Various episodes, created opening sequence.
- Stressed Eric (1997) Director. Two episodes.
- Wild Thornberries (1998) Director. Eight episodes.
- Rugrats (1999) Director. Various episodes.
- Rocket Power (1999) Director. Various episodes.
- God, The Devil and Bob (1999) Director. Three episodes.
- Invader Zim (2001) Producer & Director. All episodes except for the 1999 pilot.
- Trubble Bub (2004) Creator, Writer, Producer, Director, Voices, Boards, Designs, Timing.

== Awards ==
- 29th Annual Annie Award for Outstanding Individual Achievement for Storyboarding in an Animated Television Production.
- 2001 World Animation Celebration for Best Title Sequence. Invader Zim
