= Mother's Day (Rugrats) =

- Rugrats episode
- Episode no.: Season 4 Episode 2
- Directed by: Norton Virgien; Toni Vian
- Written by: Jon Cooksey; Ali Marie Matheson; J. David Stem; David N. Weiss; Susan Hood; Ed Resto
- Original air date: May 6, 1997

Guest appearance
- Kim Cattrall as Melinda Finster

Episode chronology
← Previous "A Rugrats Chanukah"	Next → "Spike's Babies"

"Mother's Day", also known as the "Rugrats Mother's Day Special" or "Rugrats Mother's Day", is the second episode of the fourth season of the American animated television series Rugrats and the show's 67th episode overall. It revolves around the holiday from the perspective of a group of babies—Tommy Pickles, Chuckie Finster, and Phil and Lil DeVille. Tommy, Phil, and Lil attempt to find the perfect mother for Chuckie (who is raised only by his father Chas) while sharing their favorite memories about their moms. At the end of the episode, Chuckie's mother is revealed to have died of a terminal illness. It concludes with Chuckie and Chas looking through a box of her belongings, including a poem she had written for her son. Meanwhile, Didi Pickles tries to plan the perfect Mother's Day with her mom Minka, while Betty DeVille helps Stu Pickles with his invention to help mothers.

Norton Virgien and Toni Vian directed the episode from a script by Jon Cooksey, Ali Marie Matheson, J. David Stem, David N. Weiss, Susan Hood, and Ed Resto. Series co-creator Paul Germain had pitched two potential storylines to explain the absence of Chuckie's mother, but Nickelodeon executives rejected his proposed ideas that the mother was either divorced from Chas or had died. Before "Mother's Day" premiered, only minor references to Chuckie's mother had been made. Germain left the show in 1993, and several new writers replaced him. The concept was later revised and approved as a Mother's Day special. Germain said that he was disappointed at being unable to cover the topic during his time on the series.

Broadcast on Nickelodeon in the United States on May 6, 1997, "Mother's Day" was one of several half-hour specials that Nickelodeon commissioned for Rugrats. The episode was featured on the 1998 VHS release Rugrats: Mommy Mania, and was later made available for digital download along with the rest of the fourth season. "Mother's Day" was praised by critics and has been the subject of several retrospective reviews for its treatment of the death of a parent. It was also praised for its positive representation of breastfeeding and expansion on the definition of motherhood. It won the CableACE Award for Writing a Children's Special or Series, and was nominated for the Humanitas Prize for the Children's Animation Category. The series received a nomination for a Primetime Emmy Award for Outstanding Animated Program for the 49th Primetime Emmy Awards after Nickelodeon submitted "Mother's Day" for consideration.

== Plot ==
On Mother's Day, toddler Angelica Pickles constructs a macaroni sculpture of her head as a present to her mother, telling the Rugrats the meaning of the holiday. After dropping off his son Chuckie, Chas Finster gives his friend Didi Pickles a box of his wife's belongings as he fears that Chuckie will find it. Chas does not feel he is ready to talk to Chuckie about his mother. While helping the other babies, Phil and Lil DeVille and Tommy Pickles look for the perfect gifts for their mothers, Chuckie feels uncertain about how he should celebrate Mother's Day. Tommy, Phil, and Lil share their favorite memories of their mothers with Chuckie. Phil and Lil remembered they had their first laugh while being breastfed by their mother, who said it was the best gift they gave her. Tommy reminisces about his mom comforting him while he was in a neonatal intensive care unit. The babies think of a plan to find Chuckie a new mother. Their attempts to have Tommy's dog Spike and Lil act as his mom are unsuccessful. Angelica agrees to act as Chuckie's mother only if he completes her macaroni sculpture. Meanwhile, Didi takes her mom Minka to a spa, and Betty DeVille helps Stu Pickles with his invention to help mothers.

A promotional video from Nickelodeon that shows a key scene from the episode

Angelica tasks Chuckie to pick a dandelion to decorate her sculpture. He is unable to obtain it after being chased by a bee and Stu's malfunctioning Mother's Day invention, which is a vacuum-like machine that destroys a majority of the lawn. After Chuckie breaks her macaroni head, Angelica orders him to stay in the closet along with Tommy, Phil, and Lil. While the babies console Chuckie, he realizes that his dad meets all the requirements of a good mother. They open Chas' box, finding a spade, a journal of pressed flowers, and a photograph of Chuckie's mother. Meanwhile, Stu's invention continues to vacuum up mud before finally exploding inside the house. Didi is disappointed that Minka did not like the spa, but Minka says she only wanted to spend time with her daughter for Mother's Day. Chuckie gives Chas the picture of his mother as a Mother's Day present. Chas decides to talk to Chuckie about his mother, telling him that his mother died of a terminal illness shortly after his birth. He explains that she wrote the diary while she was in the hospital, and reads a poem aloud that she wrote for Chuckie. The mother narrates the poem during a flashback to when she played with Chuckie in the backyard. As they play in the backyard, the episode ends with Chuckie telling his friends that his mother is all around in him in nature.

== Production ==
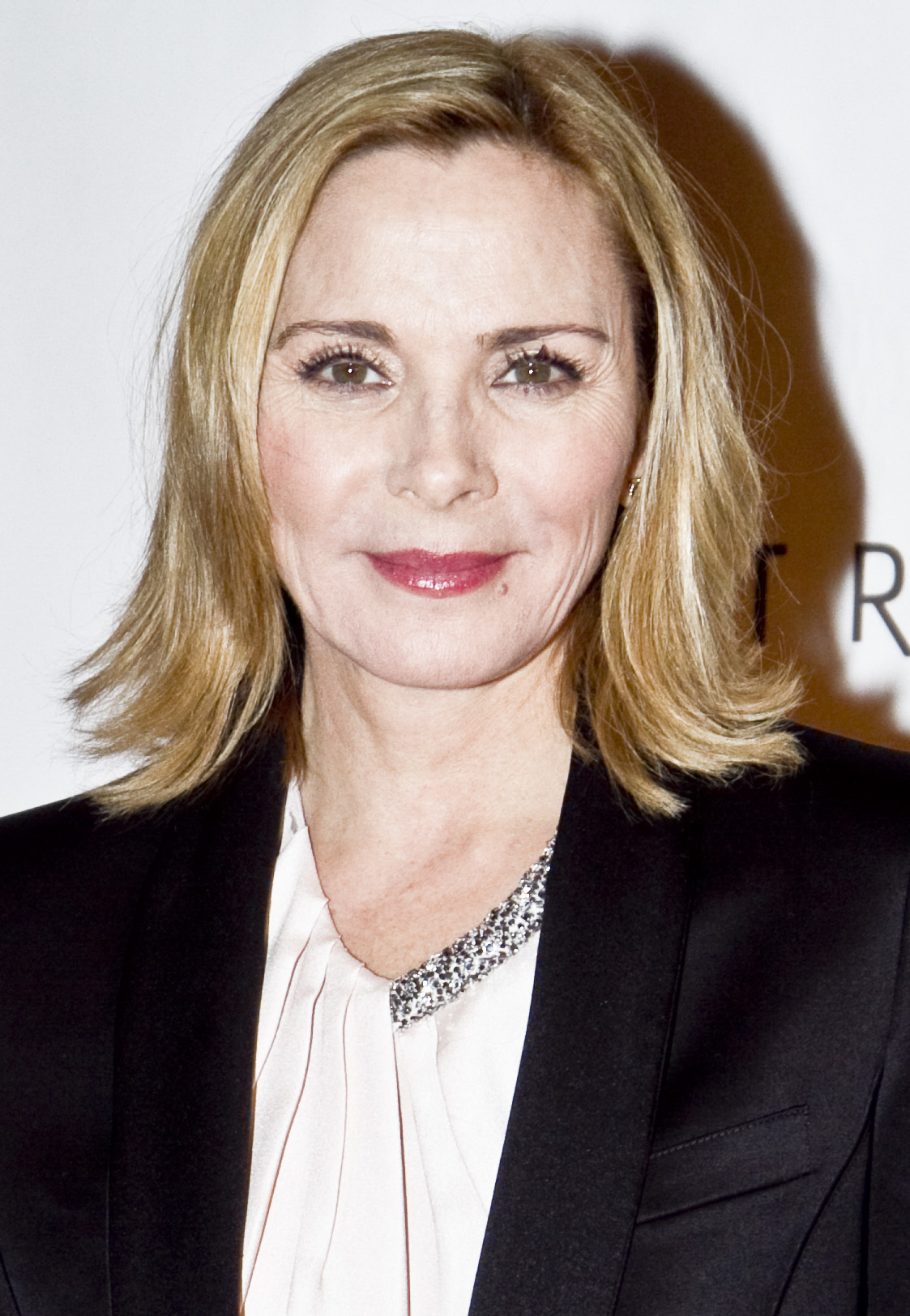
Kim Cattrall has a guest role as Melinda in the episode.

The 23-minute and 46-second episode was written by Jon Cooksey, Ali Marie Matheson, J. David Stem, David N. Weiss, Susan Hood, and Ed Resto. Directed by Norton Virgien and Toni Vian, it was produced by the animation studio Klasky Csupo Productions, a part of Nickelodeon Animation Studio. Cella Nichols Duffy, Gabor Csupo, Arlene Klasky, Paul De Meyer, Stem, and Weiss also produced the episode. Mark Mothersbaugh and Ruby Andrews contributed to the music. In 2016, co-creator Paul Germain revealed that the concept for the episode, and the discussion about the status of Chuckie's mother, was previously pitched to Nickelodeon executives. She was not included in the first season to avoid the need to animate a completely new character. During the production of the show's second and third seasons, Germain noticed that questions about the character's absence became more prominent. He consulted with fellow co-creator Arlene Klasky, and they concluded that the only two possible ways to address the character were that she was divorced from Chas, or had died before the series' debut.

Germain and Klasky initially planned to portray the character as divorced, but Nickelodeon executives rejected the idea, feeling that the subject would be inappropriate for younger viewers. The studio also vetoed an idea to reveal that the mother was dead, contending that it would be "scary" and that "children [would not] want to see that". Germain stated this prevented them from saying much about the character in earlier seasons, adding: "We mention that she exists but we don't tell you what happened to her. We even made a joke out of it in one episode. But we weren't allowed to go into the subject." Chuckie's mother had been briefly mentioned before in the episodes "Real or Robots?" (1991), "Chuckie vs. the Potty" (1992), and "My Friend Barney" (1993).

Germain left the series in 1993, and several new writers replaced him. At that time, Nickelodeon permitted the writers and animators to include a storyline about the death of Chuckie's mother. The development of the Rugrats Mother's Day television special was announced on December 7, 1996. Kim Cattrall provided the voice for Chuckie's mother, Melinda Finster. Germain described the episode as "this whole very maudlin thing", and said that he was disappointed over his inability to cover the topic. He explained: "I just sat there thinking, 'We weren't allowed to do this, and now you guys are doing it.' That's something I regret." Mary Harrington, a supervising producer of animation for Nickelodeon, described it as one of her favorite episodes of Rugrats, and commended the writers and producers for their handling of the subject.

== Broadcast history and release ==
"Mother's Day", also promoted as "Rugrats Mother's Day Special", was originally broadcast in the United States at 8:00 p.m. Eastern Time on May 6, 1997 on Nickelodeon. The Los Angeles Times' Lee Margulies recommended the special as appropriate for children between the ages of four and eight. The episode was one of several half-hour specials created for Rugrats, with others including "The Santa Experience" (1992), "A Rugrats Passover" (1993/1995) and "A Rugrats Chanukah" (1996). According to writer Jeff Lenburg, the show's specials, including "Mother's Day", earned high ratings.

"Mother's Day" was featured on the VHS Rugrats: Mommy Mania, which was released on April 7, 1998. It was included on the 2011 CreateSpace DVD release of the show's fourth season, with the press release listing it as one of the "special episodes". The season was released on DVD again on February 6, 2018 by Paramount Home Media Distribution. The episode was later made purchasable as a digital download on the iTunes Store and Amazon Video, along with the rest of the fourth season. It is also available on streaming video on demand services, such as Paramount+.

== Critical response ==
In 1998, Eric Schmuckler of The New York Times pointed to the "Mother's Day" special as an example of the show's balance between featuring an "always sunny and usually silly" tone while also being "poignant". Schmuckler described Chas' interactions with Chuckie as "an age-appropriate version of the loss of his mother". Rugrats was nominated for the Primetime Emmy Award for Outstanding Animated Program for the 49th Primetime Emmy Awards, after Nickelodeon submitted the special for consideration, but lost to The Simpsons. The episode was also nominated for the Humanitas Prize for the Children's Animation Category in 1998, which went to the Life with Louie episode "Blinded by Love". Jon Cooksey, Ali Marie Matheson, J. David Stem, and David N. Weiss received the CableACE Award for Writing a Children's Special or Series for their contributions to the episode.

"Mother's Day" has been the subject of several retrospective reviews of the series. Philip Lewis of Mic praised it as an example of Nickelodeon's potential to cover a serious subject, noting its treatment of "the loss of a parent" as one of the series' most memorable moments. In their book Flickipedia: Perfect Films for Every Occasion, Holiday, Mood, Ordeal, and Whim, authors Michael Atkinson and Laurel Shifrin echoed Anderson's sentiment, commenting that the episode could "hit you like a truck if you let it". Victor Beigelman of A Plus put the episode on his list of seven Mothers' Day-themed television episodes, citing it as a "heavy dose of nostalgia".

Critics have also commented on other aspects of the episode. In 2016, Caroline Bologna from The Huffington Post praised the episode for showing "a joyful depiction of breastfeeding" and for normalizing it to a wider audience. Bologna contrasted the scene with the lack of images of breastfeeding in contemporary children's television, writing that the show had a "positive legacy" and proved that "this topic was deemed perfectly suitable for a children's show 20 years ago". In their 2013 essay "What Is a Mother? Gay and Lesbian Perspectives on Parenting", scholars Jack Drescher, Deborah F. Glazer, Lee Crespi, and David Schwartz analyzed "Mother's Day" as an extension of psychoanalyst Donald Winnicott's theories on early childhood. They highlighted Chuckie's realization that his father acts like a mother as "a moment of postmodern insight" that expands the definition of motherhood.
