= Judaism in Rugrats =

Religious theme in the television series Rugrats

The animated television series Rugrats has been noted for its portrayal of Judaism, a dynamic rarely represented in American animated programming during the series' broadcast run (1991–2004). Six episodes of the series are devoted to Jewish holidays and to explaining their history, and the Pickles family is shown to be part-Jewish.

The first Rugrats Jewish holiday special was suggested to the production staff in 1992 by Nickelodeon executives as a special devoted to Hanukkah. One of the show creators, Paul Germain, instead refashioned it into a Passover episode, and the series did not explore a Hanukkah special until 1996. Critical reaction to Jewish themes in Rugrats was largely positive. Each holiday special achieved high viewing numbers according to Nielsen Media Research and received positive reviews. However, Jewish character Grandpa Boris' portrayal in a 1998 Rugrats comic strip was criticized by the Anti-Defamation League for apparent antisemitism.

== Jewish themes ==
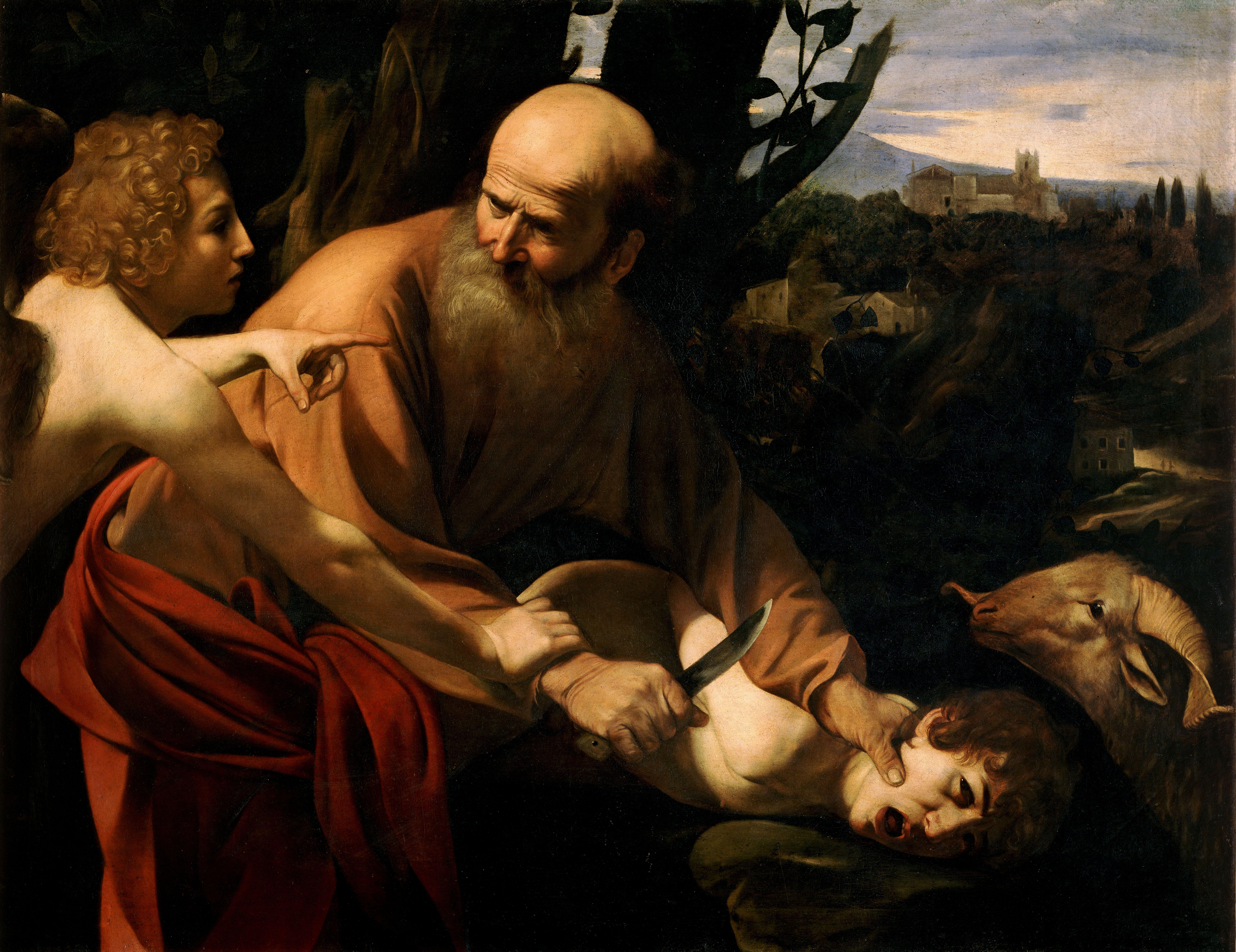
Tommy's actions towards Dil in The Rugrats Movie parallel the Sacrifice of Isaac.

=== Background ===
In Rugrats, the root of Jewish themes stem from Boris and Minka Kropotkin, the Russian Jewish maternal grandparents of Tommy Pickles. Boris and Minka follow traditional Ashkenazi Jewish practices and speak in heavy Yiddish accents. Tommy and the Pickles family therefore partake in several Jewish activities throughout the series, particularly through holidays. However, while Boris and Minka appear to practice their faith regularly, the Pickles are rarely shown to participate in religious activities outside of major holidays.

=== Rugrats (1991–2004) ===
==== A Rugrats Passover (1995) ====
"A Rugrats Passover" (Season 3, Episode 26) follows the main characters, Tommy, Phil, Lil, Chuckie, and Angelica, as they arrive at the Kropotkin residence to celebrate Passover Seder alongside Boris and Minka, and imagine themselves as Jewish figures, notably Tommy as Moses and Angelica as the pharaoh of Exodus as it's told by Boris, who has accidentally locked the group in the attic.

==== A Rugrats Chanukah (1996) ====
In "A Rugrats Chanukah" (Season 4, Episode 1), though the opening title card for the episode simply reads Chanukah, the main characters are told the story of the Maccabean Revolt by Tommy's Jewish grandfather, Boris, and imagine themselves as Biblical characters, with Tommy seeing himself as Judas Maccabeus while others play nameless Jewish characters. A reference to the song "I Have a Little Dreidel" is made, with Chuckie telling a Greek guard baby that the two are just playing with their dreidels, to which Tommy adds that they made out of clay, and Tommy's famous line, "A baby's gotta do what a baby's gotta do", is modified to "A Macca-baby's gotta do what a Macca-baby's gotta do", a reference to Maccabees. The tradition of giving chocolate coins was also mentioned. It was groundbreaking in that it was the first children's series to air a Hanukkah special, in a time when children's shows frequently released Christmas-themed episodes during the holiday season.

=== The Rugrats Movie (1998) ===
In The Rugrats Movie, a 1998 animated film produced by Nickelodeon Movies meant to introduce Tommy's younger brother Dil to audiences, makes a possible indirect reference to Judaism. Tommy almost sacrifices Dil to the monkeys by pouring baby food made from bananas on him; the scene parallels the Sacrifice of Isaac.

=== All Grown Up! (2003–2008) ===
In All Grown Up! (2003–2008), a continuation of Rugrats that follows the characters into their adolescent years, Tommy, now 10 years old, appears apathetic towards his Jewish heritage. In "Rachel, Rachel" (Season 4, Episode 4), Tommy argues with Didi over being made to attend Hebrew school and shows no interest in going until he develops a crush on his female classmate, the titular Rachel. In a stark contrast to Rachel's piety, Tommy is shown to have no basic knowledge of Judaism, unfamiliar with the concept of shabbat and never having followed a kosher diet. Tommy's younger brother Dil is similarly disinterested in Judaism and, to avoid being made to attend Hebrew school in the future, founds his own religion. While the depiction of Tommy and Dil's laxity towards their faith may not necessarily be positive, they are realistic; in 2006, the year the episode aired, statistics showed that 61% of American Jewish youth believed in God, with 14% saying that religion played a role in their daily life.

=== Rugrats (2021) ===
In the 2021 series of Rugrats, Tommy and Dil are still halachically Jewish. In the 2024 episode "Purim", Didi's father Boris tells the babies about the story of Purim, which the babies reenact in their imagination. Meanwhile, Didi's brother Jake teaches the other adults how to make hamantaschen cookies.

== Background ==
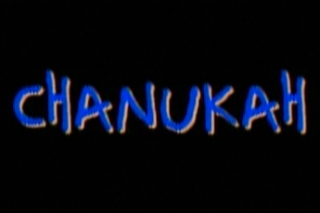
Title card for the 1996 episode "A Rugrats Chanukah". The concept of the episode dated back to 1992.

Boris and Minka were based on the Eastern European great aunts and uncles of Rugrats co-creator Arlene Klasky, who herself is Jewish. Including Jewish themes in the series was deemed essential by Klasky; in particular, she believed that making Didi Jewish and Tommy's father Stu a Christian was a crucial dynamic, as "it was important to show that difference between family." Klasky herself grew up with a Jewish mother and a non-Jewish father.

Boris and Minka first appeared in the series' first episode, "Tommy's First Birthday". Melanie Chartoff, voice of Minka and Jewish herself, had already been cast to play Didi when she was called by her agent to try out for a second voice role on the series as Minka. When given the description of the character, Chartoff felt she was incredibly clichéd, but still wanted to try out for the role. When reading her lines, she found it difficult to grasp the character's personality, as "Although the show had been created by Jews, this script had clearly not been written by them;" so she took a break so she could do research into her family memorabilia and conceive a personality to reflect in the character's voice.

In 1992, Nickelodeon executives pitched the idea of making a Chanukah special to the Rugrats production team. Germain, however, responded with a Passover special instead, as he considered it to be a "funny idea" and of "historical interest". While scripting the episode, now entitled "A Rugrats Passover", the writers were forced to audit many elements of the portrayal of the Ten Plagues, particularly the last one, so that the episode would remain accessible to children and not too frightening. Due to the overall success of "A Rugrats Passover", the Rugrats staff decided to revisit the Hanukkah special and created "A Rugrats Chanukah". One of the co-writers of the episode, David Weiss, had converted from Christianity to Judaism shortly before penning the teleplay. (He was also raised a Reform Jew when he was growing up)

== Reception ==
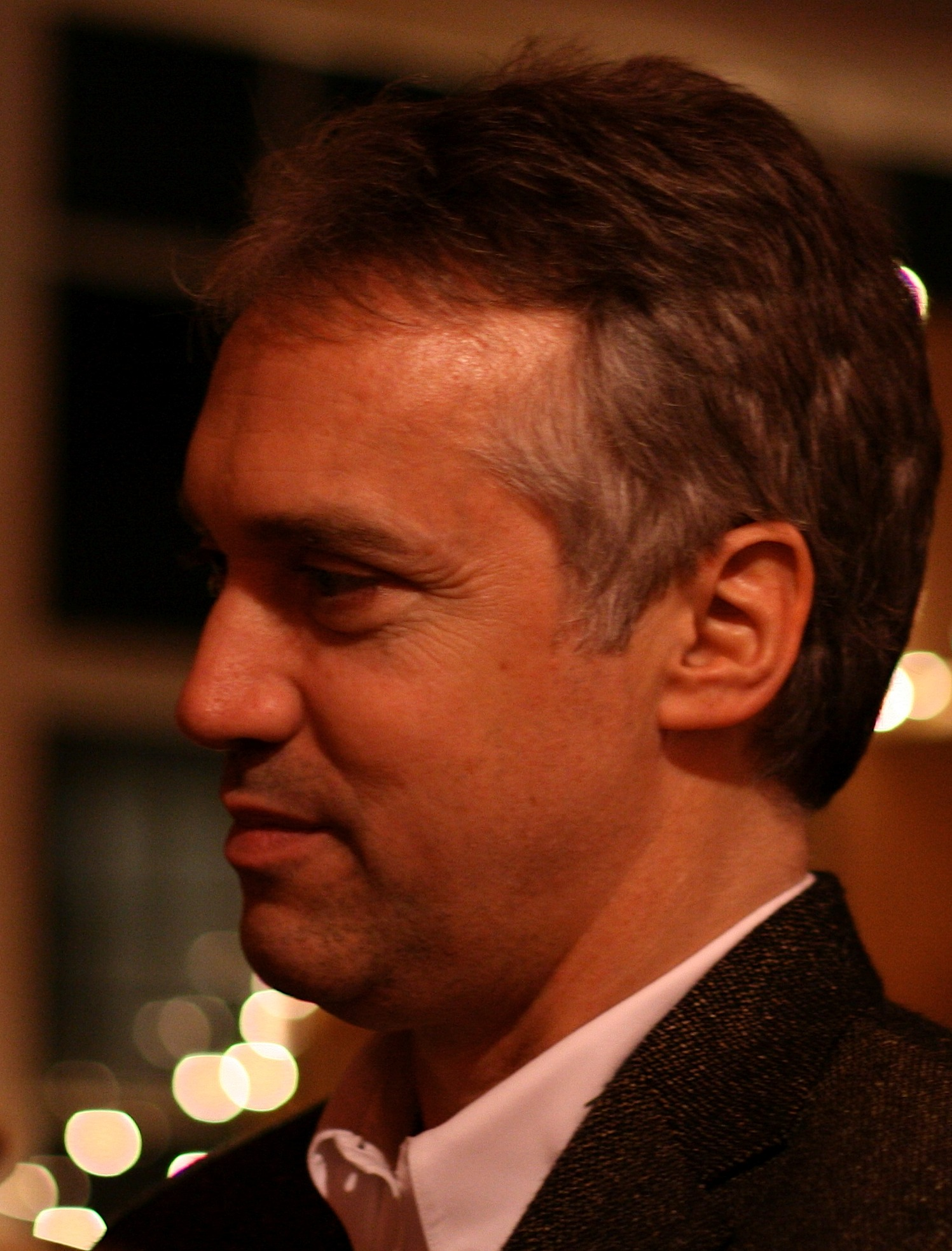
Herb Scannell responded to the ADL's concerns about Boris' design and apologized.

Rugrats was unusual among contemporary animations in its attention to Jewish ritual and tradition. "A Rugrats Passover"'s portrayal of a Seder dinner received press attention as a rare occurrence in children's programming. The episode also marked the first Passover special Nickelodeon had broadcast, while "A Rugrats Chanukah" marked the first televised animated Hanukkah program.

Fan reaction to Jewish themes in Rugrats have been overwhelmingly positive. "A Rugrats Passover" and "A Rugrats Chanukah" are two of the most popular episodes in the series broadcast run. The Passover special achieved a Nielsen Rating of 3.1 with a 4.8% share of American viewers, making it the sixth most watched American cable broadcast that week. The Hanukkah special, meanwhile, received a 7.9 Nielsen rating in Kids 2–11, the show's key demographic. Chartoff received an abundance of fan letters praising the series for detailing Judaism in sensitive fashion. She only received one complaint, from her mother, who claimed that the characterizations of Boris and Minka were antisemitic.

Critically, Rugrats' treatment of Judaism has also been acclaimed. Danny Goldberg wrote in his book How The Left Lost Teen Spirit: "I cannot think of any other TV show, animated or otherwise, in which Jewish traditions were so clearly expressed in the context of a mass appeal entertainment [than in Rugrats]." Authors Michael Atkinson and Laurel Shifrin, in their book Flickipedia: Perfect Films for Every Occasion, Holiday, Mood, Ordeal, and Whim praised the series for celebrating "secular Jewishness in the wisest and most entertaining fashion". TV Guide listed "A Rugrats Chanukah" number 5 in their 1999 "10 Best Classic Family Holiday Specials" list, opining that with the episode, "Nickelodeon's Rugrats secured its place in television history." Jewish online magazine Schmooze listed Tommy as the number 1 fictional Jewish character of all time. They also wrote that if someone had yet to see either one of the holiday specials, their "Jewish education is incomplete."

The series has received several accolades for its Jewish themes. In 2001, Rugrats won a Jewish Image Award for "Outstanding Achievement". "A Rugrats Passover" itself received three nominations from different television award programs. It was nominated for a Primetime Emmy Award in the category "Primetime Emmy Award for Outstanding Animated Program (for Programming Less Than One Hour)", but lost to The Simpsons episode "Lisa's Wedding". At the 23rd Annual Annie Awards it was nominated in the category "Best Individual Achievement for Writing in the Field of Animation", but was beaten by the episode "The Tick vs. Arthur’s Bank Account" from Fox Kids' animated series The Tick. In 1995, it was Rugrats' submission for a CableACE award; it received a nomination but did not win. In 2007 the Sherwin Miller Museum of Jewish Art in Tulsa, Oklahoma opened an exhibition of Biblical images in art and pop culture, including a poster for Let My Babies Go!: A Passover Story, the picture book based on "A Rugrats Passover".

=== Design of Grandpa Boris ===
The Anti-Defamation League (ADL) criticized the design of Grandpa Boris and charged it with being antisemitic. The controversy erupted when a 1998 Rugrats comic strip was published, featuring Boris in a synagogue reciting the Mourner's Kaddish. The ADL issued a statement saying that the design resembled Nazi-era depictions of Jews, and the fact that the character was reciting the sacred prayer perverted its solemnity. The Washington Post, the newspaper who published the strip, issued a similar statement in their Editor's Note section, criticizing Nickelodeon for not showing better judgment in editing the strip.

Though former Nickelodeon president Albie Hecht, a Jew himself, was dumbfounded by the accusation and deemed it absurd, Herb Scannell, president of the company in 1998, responded to the complaints and apologized to ADL. Scannell issued a statement promising that neither the strip nor the character would ever be published again. In the statement, he also noted, "Unfortunately, the creators of the strip made an error in judgment by referencing the Kaddish. I agree with you that, however well-meaning, the use of the Kaddish in the comic strip was inappropriate." Abraham H. Foxman, ADL National Director, responded via a press release in which they thanked Scannell for his speedy response and commended the company in general for understanding the issue at hand; Foxman concluded by saying, "We appreciate Nickelodeon's long record of creative and quality programming and understand that it was not their intention to offend."

== See also ==
- List of fictional Jews
