= A Rugrats Kwanzaa =

- Rugrats episode
- Episode no.: Season 8 Episode 16
- Directed by: Anthony Bell
- Written by: Lisa D. Hall; Jill Gorey; Barbara Herndon
- Original air date: December 11, 2001 (Note: The episode was first released in A Rugrats Kwanzaa VHS on September 25, 2001.)
- Running time: 23 minutes

Guest appearances
- Irma P. Hall as Aunt T.; Kevin Michael Richardson as Martin Luther King Jr.; Kimberly Brooks as Young Lucy Carmichael; Bill Cobbs as Uncle Charles; Erv Immerman as Radio Announcer; Cynthia Kaye Hunt as Choir Soloist

Episode chronology
← Previous "Adventure Squad/The Way More Things Work/Talk of the Town"	Next → "Pre-School Daze"
- Rugrats (season 8)

"A Rugrats Kwanzaa" is a television special from the American animated television series Rugrats. It is the 16th episode of the eighth season, and the 141st episode overall. It examines Kwanzaa from the perspective of toddler Susie Carmichael during a visit from her great-aunt. Susie, her friends—Tommy Pickles, Chuckie and Kimi Finster, and Phil and Lil DeVille—and family learn about the holiday from Aunt T., but Susie becomes depressed after thinking she is the only member of her family not to achieve greatness. Aunt T. consoles her by sharing her memories using a scrapbook. The episode concludes with Susie realizing she still has plenty of time in her life to discover what makes her great.

Anthony Bell directed the episode from a script by Lisa D. Hall, Jill Gorey, and Barbara Herndon. It was produced as part of Nickelodeon's commitment to feature cultural diversity in its programming. Rugrats was one of the first mainstream television shows to feature Kwanzaa. Critics compared it to similar holiday episodes by As Told by Ginger and The Proud Family. "A Rugrats Kwanzaa" was first broadcast on December 11, 2001. A picture book entitled The Rugrats' First Kwanzaa was adapted from the script. The episode was released on VHS in 2001, and it was later included in other home media releases.

"A Rugrats Kwanzaa" was praised by critics for its representation of the holiday and the voice acting; there was a mixed response to its commercialism. Cree Summer, who voices Susie, earned a nomination for an NAACP Image Award for Outstanding Performance by a Youth at the 34th NAACP Image Awards for her role in the episode.

== Plot ==
Toddler Susie Carmichael is visited by her great-aunt T. on Christmas. Aunt T. wants to celebrate Kwanzaa instead with Susie's family—her parents Lucy and Randy and older siblings Alisa, Buster, and Edwin. The Carmichaels do not normally observe the holiday, and Susie has never heard of it. Aunt T. describes it as honoring the legacy and greatness of their ancestors. Susie's friends—Tommy Pickles, Chuckie and Kimi Finster, and Phil and Lil DeVille—are invited to the Carmichaels' home as part of the festivities. Susie feels inferior to the rest of her family after Aunt T. congratulates them on their accolades. Aunt T. decides to hold the Karamu early to bring the family together. She gives Susie and her siblings presents, though Susie is disappointed to receive a scrapbook. Susie is not assigned a role in the family's preparations for Karamu, leading her to believe she is inferior to the rest of her family for never winning an award.

Following the babies' encouragement, Susie tries to emulate her siblings, including acting as class president, conducting scientific experiments, and playing soccer. When Susie fails at these tasks, Tommy advises her to find something special for herself. Susie unsuccessfully attempts to create a clay sculpture of her head as a gift to Aunt T., though her great-aunt reminds Susie that greatness is not measured by prizes. During a power outage, Aunt T. uses the scrapbook to share her memories with the children. Aunt T. and her husband Charles had met Martin Luther King Jr. while driving to the March on Washington for Jobs and Freedom. On another occasion, Lucy performed "This Little Light of Mine" as her first solo in church despite nearly being too afraid to sing. Lucy says Aunt T. is one of the greatest people of all and recalls how she provided her with money to attend Harvard Medical School. Once the power is restored, the family have dinner and Susie does the toast with her sculpture. Aunt T. assures Susie she will discover her greatness later in life.

== Production ==
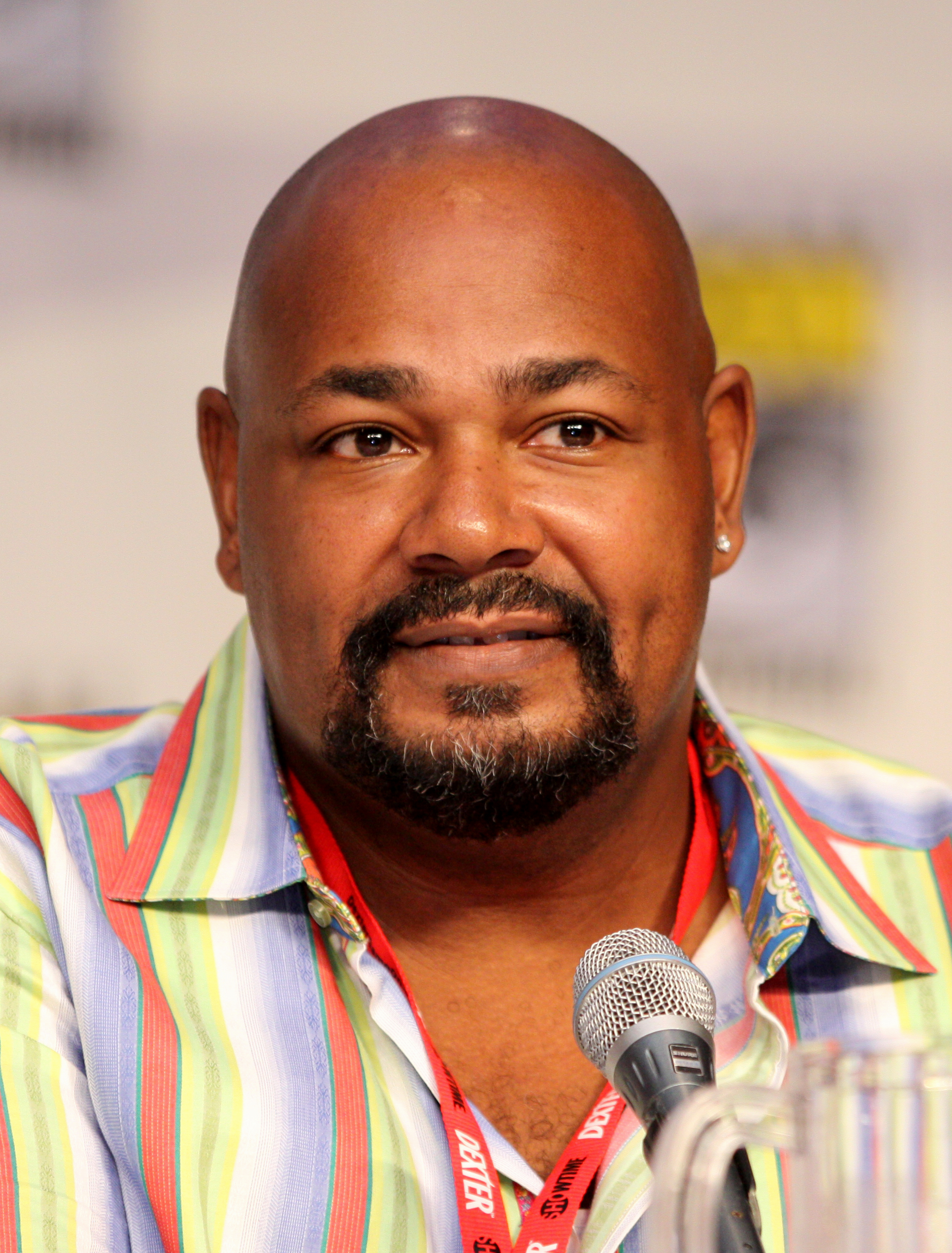
Kevin Michael Richardson has a guest role as Martin Luther King Jr. in the episode.

The 23-minute episode was written by Lisa D. Hall, Jill Gorey, and Barbara Herndon and directed by Anthony Bell. It was also known as "A Rugrats Kwanzaa Special" and "Rugrats: The Kwanzaa Special". Nickelodeon's senior vice president for production Marjorie Cohn identified Rugrats as the "natural home" for a Kwanzaa episode; the series had previously shown holiday specials on Christmas and Hanukkah. Cohen explained the network included cultural diversity and representation in its programming to remain true to its "commitment to being there for all kids". Nickelodeon president Cyma Zarghami said that the network followed "the idea that the kids on our programs look like the kids who watch it", and further explained: "Diversity is something we celebrate every day, and we believe kids are everyday heroes".

Irma P. Hall, who guest-starred as Aunt T., praised Rugrats for introducing Kwanzaa to a larger audience, and said she often talked about the holiday with her non-black friends. Discussing the importance of the episode, Hall said: "One thing that 9-11 taught us is that we really need to know as much as possible about other people's cultures. ... Getting to know about all these different holidays that people celebrate, it helps to reinforce the fact that we are more alike than different." Other guest appearances in the episode included Kevin Michael Richardson as Martin Luther King Jr., Kimberly Brooks as the younger version of Lucy Carmichael, and Bill Cobbs as Uncle Charles.

According to Mental Floss, Rugrats was one of the first shows to focus on Kwanzaa in mainstream television. Critics compared "A Rugrats Kwanzaa" to episodes from As Told by Ginger and The Proud Family, which aired the same year. An Associated Press contributor wrote that the Kwanzaa-centric storylines in Rugrats and The Proud Family helped to draw attention to the holiday. The Orlando Sentinel's Tammy Carter felt Rugrats and As Told By Ginger had focused on Kwanzaa and Hanukkah, respectively, to expand holiday programming beyond Christmas. While also discussing the episode's educational value, The Christian Science Monitor's M. S. Mason thought "A Rugrats Kwanzaa" was used to further develop Susie as a character.

== Broadcast history and release ==
External videos
- "Lucy Carmichael sings 'This Little Light of Mine'"
- "Martin Luther King Jr. on Rugrats"

"A Rugrats Kwanzaa" was the 16th episode of Rugrats's eighth season and runs for 23 minutes; it was originally broadcast in the United States at 8:30 p.m. Eastern Time on December 11, 2001, on Nickelodeon, and repeated on December 15 and 26. The same year, author Stephanie Greene adapted the episode's script into the picture book The Rugrats' First Kwanzaa, published by Simon Spotlight and Nickelodeon. Greene used misspelled words, including "Kwonzo", "eggsackly", and "imbentor", to represent the babies' dialogue. Segundo Garcia drew the illustrations. The book is intended for children between the ages of four and eight.

"A Rugrats Kwanzaa" has been included on several Rugrats home media releases. On September 25, 2001, Nickelodeon and Paramount Home Entertainment released the special on VHS; the tape also includes the episodes "And the Winner Is..." and "Cooking with Susie" as two "bonus cartoons". "A Rugrats Kwanzaa" was made available on the Turkey and Mistletoe DVD, the second disc of the Rugrats: Holiday Celebration DVD set. Nickelodeon released the episode as part of Rugrats' season seven DVD, while the iTunes Store put it with the show's eighth season instead. The episode was included in the Rugrats, The Complete Series release. It was made available to stream on numerous video on demand services, including Amazon Prime Video, Google Play. and Paramount+.

In December 2003, Nickelodeon played "A Rugrats Kwanzaa" during its "Nickmas" television marathon. The network included two clips from the episode on NickRewind's YouTube account. The flashback of Lucy singing at church was uploaded on December 28, 2016; the segment involving Martin Luther King Jr. was uploaded on January 16, 2017 to commemorate his birthday. "A Rugrats Kwanzaa" was screened as part of the 14th annual Kwanzaa Observance Program in Chicago, Illinois, and at a separate event at the African Burial Ground National Monument in December 2017. The episode was also shown as at a 2019 event at the Paley Center for Media, along with "A Rugrats Chanukah"; the center has included the episode in its collection of African-American comedy.

== Critical response ==
Critics praised Rugrats for introducing Kwanzaa to a wider audience. According to Den of Geek and Blavity, the series had become known and well-received for celebrating a diverse set of holidays. A writer for TheJournal.ie believed "A Rugrats Kwanzaa" might be some children's only experiences with the holiday; in a 2017 retrospective review of Rugrats, Bustle's Madeleine Aggeler commended its holiday specials for not talking down to these younger viewers. The Los Angeles Times' Lee Margulies said "A Rugrats Kwanzaa" had a "special resonance for African American viewers" since it was rooted in broader concepts related to Kwanzaa, as shown through Susie's insecurities, rather than a lecture on African American history. In a similar sentiment, Ted Cox, writing for the Daily Herald, appreciated how Kwanzaa's seven core principles were represented by Aunt T.'s actions rather than dialogue. The Hollywood Reporter's Deborah Holmes praised the episode's respect for the "legacy of blacks", noting that it encompasses Kwanzaa's message of every person, regardless of stature, being able to contribute to society. Children's literature scholar Cathlena Martin cited Rugrats' emphasis on family and friends as encouraging a more "positive awareness of race and culture".

The Daily Telegraph's David Rennie wrote that Rugrats contributed to the commercialization of Kwanzaa; the holiday's creator Maulana Karenga was critical of "the corporate world's move to penetrate and dominate the Kwanzaa market". On the other hand, Kristen Lopez, writing for Livingly Media, believed the series' holiday programming was "able to bridge the gap between telling a heartfelt story and acting as a marketing tool".

The voice acting was the subject of praise. Cree Summer, who voices Susie, received a nomination for an NAACP Image Award for Outstanding Performance by a Youth at the 34th NAACP Image Awards for her performance in the episode. Margulies praised Irma P. Hall for "energetically voic[ing]" her character, and Holmes wrote Hall and Summer were "great" and "delightful" in their roles, respectively.
