= A Rugrats Passover =

- Rugrats episode
- The infant Moses (Tommy) in the Nile River
- Episode no.: Season 3 Episode 23
- Directed by: Jim Duffy; Steve Socki; Jeff McGrath
- Written by: Peter Gaffney; Paul Germain; Rachel Lipman; Jonathon Greenberg
- Production code: 062
- Original air date: April 13, 1995

Guest appearance
- Dana Hill as Taskmaster Baby

Episode chronology
← Previous "Moving Away"	Next → "A Rugrats Chanukah"

"A Rugrats Passover" is the 23rd episode of the third season of the American animated television series Rugrats (and the 65th episode of the series overall). It first aired on Nickelodeon in the United States on April 13, 1995. The episode follows series regulars Grandpa Boris and the babies as they become trapped in the attic on Passover; to pass the time, Boris tells the Jewish story of the Exodus. During the episode, the babies themselves reenact the story, with Tommy portraying Moses, while his cousin Angelica represents the Pharaoh of Egypt.

"A Rugrats Passover" was directed by Jim Duffy, Steve Socki, and Jeff McGrath from a script by Peter Gaffney, Paul Germain, Rachel Lipman, and Jonathan Greenberg. The episode was conceived in 1992, when Germain responded to a Nickelodeon request for a Rugrats Hanukkah special by creating a Passover episode instead. The episode scored a 3.1 Nielsen Rating, making it the highest-rated show in Nickelodeon's history. It was nominated for a Primetime Emmy Award, an Annie Award, and a CableACE Award.

The episode made Rugrats one of the first animated series to focus on a Jewish holiday; its success precipitated the creation of "A Rugrats Chanukah" in 1996. However, both episodes faced controversy when the Anti-Defamation League compared the artistic design of the older characters to antisemitic drawings from a 1930s Nazi newspaper. Despite this, in 2007, a novelization of the Passover episode was exhibited at the Sherwin Miller Museum of Jewish Art in Tulsa, Oklahoma.

== Plot ==
As the episode opens, Tommy and Angelica Pickles and their parents are all gathering to celebrate the Passover Seder at the home of Didi's parents, Boris and Minka Kropotkin. Stu and Angelica, who are Christians, both find Passover boring, and Angelica asks why she and her parents should be at the Seder at all, especially considering Boris and Minka aren't actually related to them. Following an argument with Minka about what type of wine glasses they should use (either the glasses that belonged to Minka's mother or the ones that belonged to Boris' father), Boris storms out of the room; the two families arrive and Didi tries comforting her mom, who believes Boris has run away.

Boris hasn't reappeared by the time Tommy's best friend, Chuckie Finster, and his dad, Chas, arrive to join the celebration. When the Seder begins, Angelica releases the babies due to Tommy leaving his screwdriver behind. The children set off to search for toys, eventually finding Boris in the attic. Boris explains that he felt bad about yelling at Minka, and had gone to look for her mother's wine glasses, but had become locked inside when the door closed behind him (it can't open from the inside). Angelica tests the door and inadvertently locks them all in again, thus beginning a running gag throughout the episode.

Angelica tells Boris that he's not really missing anything and admits that she thinks that Passover's a dumb holiday. Boris tries convincing her otherwise by telling her and the boys the story of the Exodus, hoping to improve their understanding of Passover. As he talks, Angelica imagines herself as the Pharaoh of Egypt, who commands the Hebrew slaves (imagined as the other Rugrats and numerous other babies) to throw their newborn sons into the Nile River. One Hebrew slave defies the order by putting her infant son, Moses (imagined as Tommy), into a basket and setting the basket afloat in the river. The basket and baby are discovered by Pharaoh Angelica, who shows Moses around her palace and kingdom, and decides to make him her partner.

As Boris explains that the Pharaoh was oblivious that Moses himself was actually a Hebrew, Chas enters the attic, looking for the kids, and becomes locked in with the rest of them. He sits down and listens as Boris continues: years later, Boris says, Moses stood up for an abused Hebrew slave (imagined as Chuckie) and was outed as a Hebrew. The episode then pictures Tommy as Moses fleeing to the desert, where he becomes a shepherd and forgets about Egypt and the Pharaoh, until the voice of God calls to him from a burning bush, telling him that he must free the Hebrews from slavery.

Moses confronts the Pharaoh and demands that she free the Hebrews. She refuses and calls her guards (one of which is voiced by Dana Hill) to drag Moses away; he curses her kingdom with terrible plagues until she relents and allows Moses to leave with the enslaved Hebrews. As Boris is explaining how the Pharaoh deceived the Hebrews and prevented them from leaving because she said "well I changed my mind". Angelica's parents, Drew and Charlotte, then arrive and become locked in the room with the others.

Boris resumes the story: the Pharaoh's treachery causes Moses to curse her once more, this time with a plague on the first-born children of Egypt. The Pharaoh, after realizing that she herself is a first-born child, bargains with Moses: he can leave if he calls off this final plague. Moses hesitates at first but complies and leads the Hebrews out of Egypt. The Pharaoh reneges on her promise after realizing that she set "all" of the Hebrews free like the slave who gets the Reptar cereal, the slave who gets the goat milk, and the slave who prepares her bath. She leads her remaining army to pursue them.

Minka, Didi, and Stu arrive in the attic to find the group enthralled by the end of Boris' story: Moses, cornered, calls down the power of God to part the Red Sea, which the Hebrews are approaching. They pass through the parted waters, which then crash back together behind them, engulfing the Pharaoh and her army. Underwater, Pharaoh blames Cynthia for this mess they are in as Cynthia is snatched up by a shark.

With the story over, the family gets up to finish the Seder only to see the wind blow the door shut, locking them all in. Boris decides to tell them another story. At first, Chas thinks it's about how the Hebrews wandered the desert for forty years before finally reaching the Promised Land. Boris actually explains that it's actually a story about how his aunt and uncle met at Passover Seder back in Russia.

== Production ==
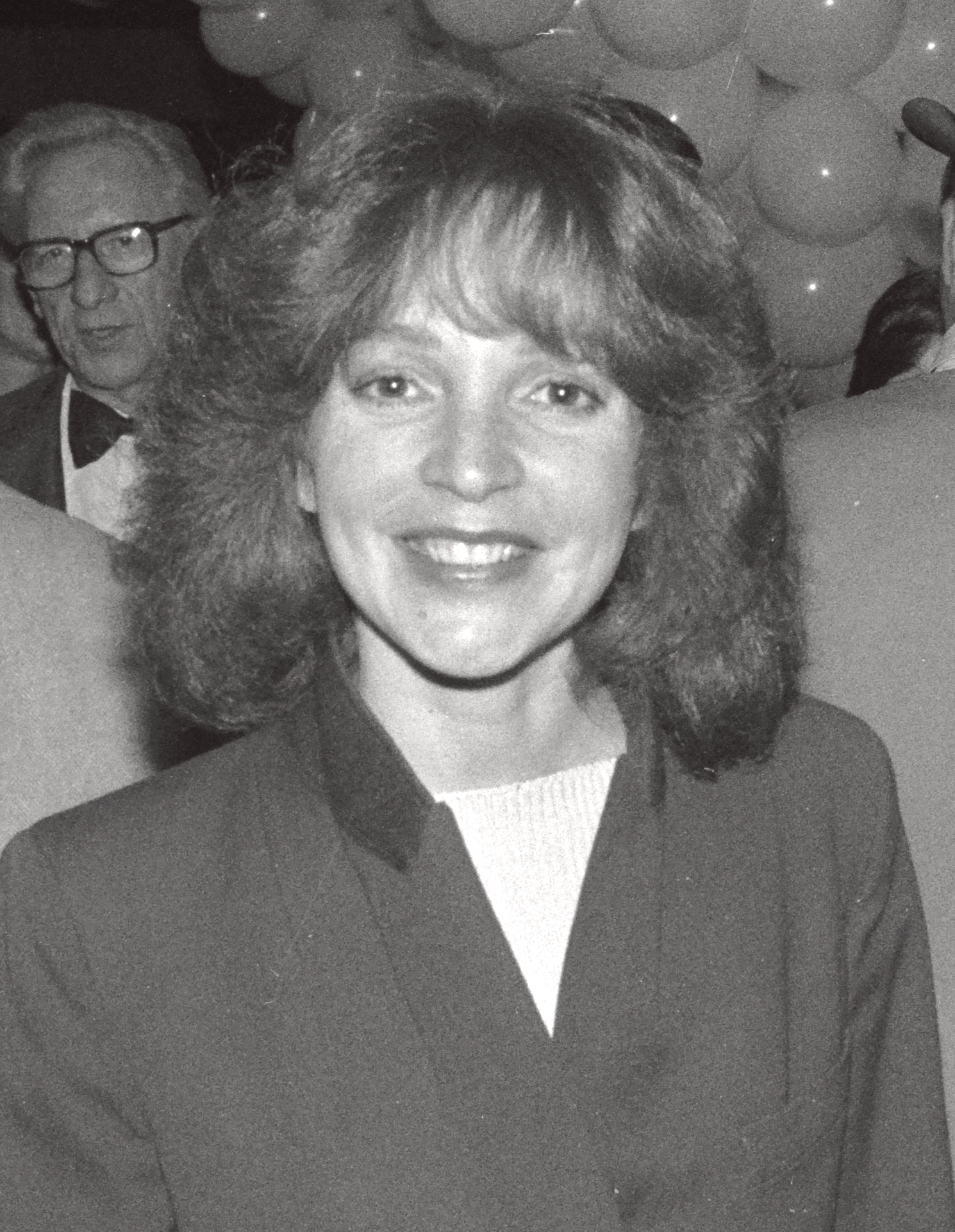
Melanie Chartoff voiced both Didi and Minka in the episode.

The episode's inception in 1992 followed a call by Nickelodeon to the Rugrats production staff, pitching the concept of a special episode concerning Hanukkah. The crew agreed instead that a Passover special would offer both "historical interest" and a "funny idea", so Paul Germain—founder of the series along with Arlene Klasky and Gábor Csupó—pitched the Passover idea instead.

Germain wrote the episode's teleplay along with regular Rugrats writers Peter Gaffney, Rachel Lipman, and Jonathan Greenberg; animators Jim Duffy, Steve Socki, and Jeff McGrath directed. While scripting the episode, now entitled "A Rugrats Passover", the writers were forced to audit many elements of the portrayal of plagues, particularly the third one, so it could still be accessible to children and not too frightening. Though regular episodes of the series comprised two separate 15-minute segments, "A Rugrats Passover" had a special 22-minute format, occupying the show's full network Rugrats slot. The show's voice actors each spent from fifteen minutes to four hours in recording sessions for the episode.

== Themes ==
"A Rugrats Passover" was unusual among contemporary animation in its attention to Jewish ritual and tradition. Its portrayal of a Seder dinner received press attention as a rare occurrence in children's programming. The episode was also unusual among animated series for discussing the characters' religious affiliations. It revealed Boris, Minka, and Didi's adherence to Judaism, and compared it with the relative non-participation of Stu and his side of the family. Chuckie and his father Chas, meanwhile, were portrayed as nonreligious yet inclusive and enthused to learn about the customs of the holiday.

As with other Rugrats episodes, "A Rugrats Passover" depicts "the innocence of a baby's perception of the world," emphasizing the young characters' intense, childlike reactions to their environment. Creator Klasky identified the episode's depiction of the Pickles family as "very loving, [and] basically functional" as strikingly different from the prevailing trends in contemporary television programming. Another episode element common to the series' broader themes is its treatment of Angelica's mother Charlotte, who throughout the episode is glued to her cell phone and engrossed in her business life, despite her professed desire to provide Angelica with an educational environment.

== Reception ==
=== Ratings and accolades ===
"A Rugrats Passover" was initially broadcast on Nickelodeon in the United States on April 13, 1995. Repeats of the episode began that Saturday at 7:30 p.m. The episode received a Nielsen Rating of 3.1, with a 4.8% share of American audiences, making it the sixth most-watched cable telecast that week. According to Catherine Mullally, then-Vice President and Executive Producer of Nickelodeon Video and Audio Works, the episode was the highest Nielsen-rated telecast in the network's history. However, in 1998, it was supplanted by another Rugrats special, the Thanksgiving episode "The Turkey Who Came to Dinner", which attracted 3.7 million viewers (9.4/28).

The episode was nominated for a Primetime Emmy Award for Outstanding Animated Program (for Programming Less Than One Hour), losing to The Simpsons episode "Lisa's Wedding". At the 23rd Annual Annie Awards, it was nominated for Best Individual Achievement for Writing in the Field of Animation, losing to "The Tick vs. Arthur’s Bank Account" from Fox Kids' animated series The Tick. In 1995, it was Rugrats' submission for a CableACE award, receiving a nomination but not winning.

=== Home video and merchandise ===
The episode was released in several formats, including DVD and VHS. It appears on the video release A Rugrats Passover alongside the episode "Toys in the Attic". The cassette was reissued, alongside newer Rugrats videos Grandpa's Favorite Stories and Return of Reptar, in early 1997. In 1998, publisher Simon Spotlight released a novelization of the episode, entitled Let My Babies Go! A Passover Story, written by Sarah Wilson and illustrated by Barry Goldberg. A LaserDisc release was planned, titled "A Rugrats Chanukah/A Rugrats Passover", but was cancelled. One copy of the disc is known to exist.

=== Critical response ===
"A Rugrats Passover" became one of the series' most popular episodes. John J. O'Connor of The New York Times wrote, "If not a first, it certainly is a rarity." Ted Cox of the Daily Herald called the episode "among the best holiday TV specials ever produced." Other reviews applauded the episode for its treatment of Judaism. Authors Michael Atkinson and Laurel Shifrin, in their book Flickipedia: Perfect Films for Every Occasion, Holiday, Mood, Ordeal, and Whim, praised the episode for celebrating "secular Jewishness in the wisest and most entertaining fashion [...] Grandpa Boris regales the kids with an epic, albeit abridged, Exodus story." Halley Blair of Forward Magazine called the episode "a comical primer for getting children ready for upcoming seders," and Danny Goldberg, in How the Left Lost Teen Spirit, noted that the episode's Jewish themes were "clearly expressed in the context of a mass appeal entertainment." Among many positive reviews in Jewish community publications, Gila Wertheimer of the Chicago Jewish Star said it "will entertain children of all ages – and their parents."

In 2006, however, Joel Keller of AOL's TV Squad noted that he "always hated" the episode, and resented that it was one of only two Passover-themed television episodes he could find via a Google search.

=== Anti-Defamation League controversy ===
"A Rugrats Passover," along with other Rugrats episodes featuring Boris and Minka, attracted controversy when the Anti-Defamation League (ADL) claimed that the two characters resembled anti-Semitic drawings that had appeared in a 1930s Nazi newspaper. Then-Nickelodeon president Albie Hecht, himself Jewish, stated he was dumbfounded by this criticism, which he deemed absurd. The controversy resurfaced in 1998, when the ADL criticized another appearance of Boris, this time reciting the Mourner's Kaddish in a Rugrats comic strip published in newspapers during the Jewish New Year. Unlike Hecht, Nickelodeon's then-president Herb Scannell agreed with the criticism and apologized, promising never to run the character or the strip again.

=== Legacy ===
"A Rugrats Passover" is Nickelodeon's first programming involving Passover; the network went on to broadcast other episodes concerning Jewish traditions, including "Harold's Bar Mitzvah", a 1997 episode of Hey Arnold! in which the character Harold Berman prepares for his Bar Mitzvah, although the episode itself wasn't about The Exodus. Rugrats in turn produced a second Jewish holiday episode, this time to meet the network executives' original Hanukkah special pitch. David N. Weiss (who had recently converted to Judaism) and J. David Stem wrote the script, and Raymie Muzquiz directed the episode. The special, entitled "A Rugrats Chanukah", was originally broadcast on December 4, 1996, and received a Nielsen rating of 7.9 in the Kids 2–11 demographic. Like "A Rugrats Passover", it was critically acclaimed and became one of the most popular episodes of the series.

In 2007, the Sherwin Miller Museum of Jewish Art in Tulsa, Oklahoma opened an exhibition of Biblical images in art and pop culture, including a poster for Let My Babies Go! A Passover Story, the picture book based on "A Rugrats Passover". Other items highlighted in the gallery included a promotional poster for The Simpsons episode "Simpsons Bible Stories" and a vintage Superman comic book entitled "The Red-Headed Beatle of 1000 B.C.", featuring the character Jimmy Olsen's time-traveling adventures in the Biblical age.

== See also ==
- Judaism in Rugrats
- All Grown Up!
- Rugrats Go Wild
