= Sheila Hollins, Baroness Hollins =

Professor of psychiatry

Emeritus Professor The Baroness Hollins
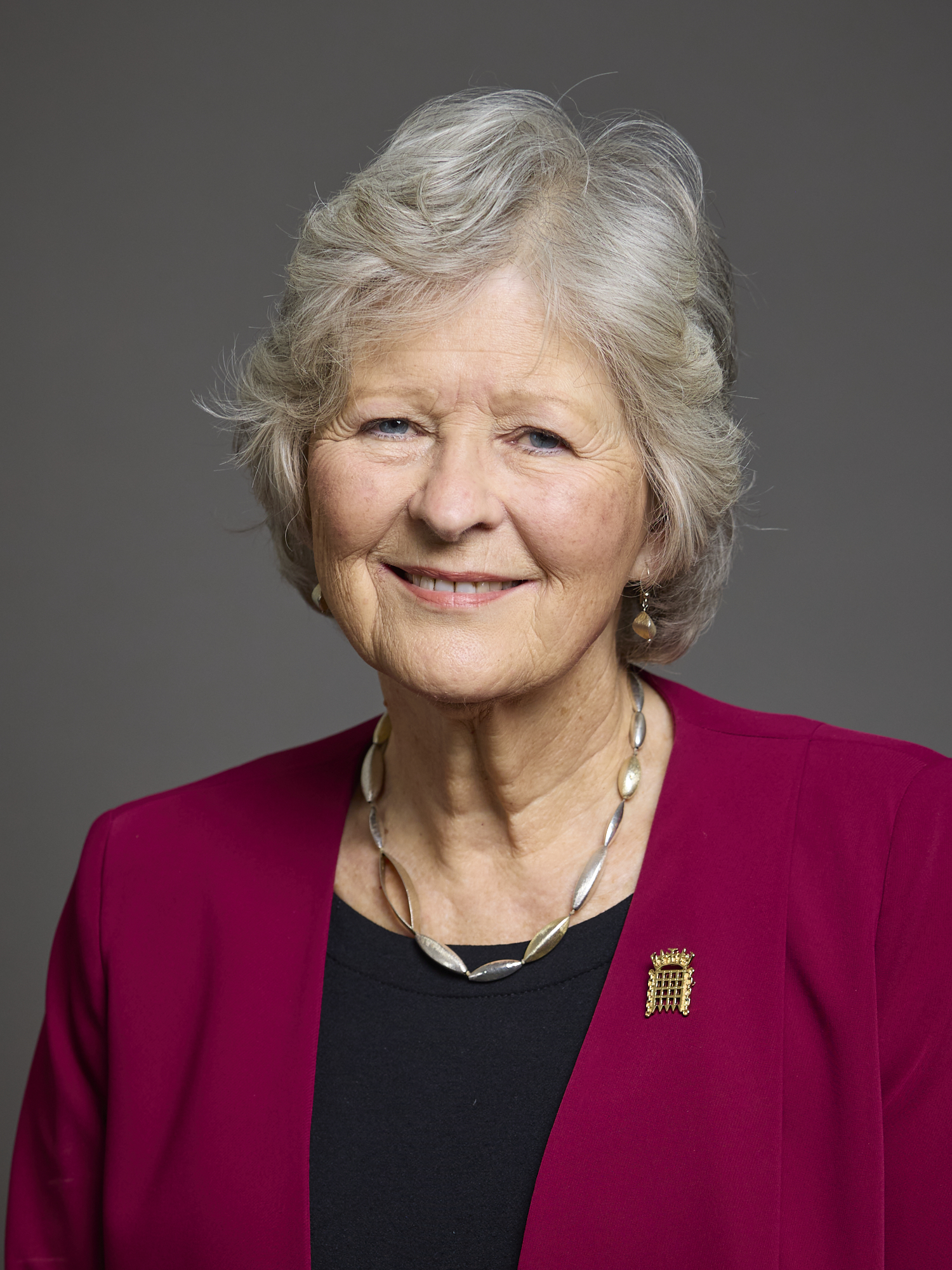
- Official portrait, 2024

Member of the House of Lords
- Lord Temporal
- Life peerage 15 November 2010

Personal details
- Born: 22 June 1946 (age 80)
- Spouse: Martin Hollins
- Children: Abigail Witchalls
- Occupation: Emeritus Professor of the psychiatry of learning disability at St George's, University of London

Sheila Clare Hollins, Baroness Hollins (born 22 June 1946), is Emeritus Professor of Psychiatry of Learning Disability at St George's, University of London, and was created a crossbench life peer in the House of Lords on 15 November 2010 taking the title Baroness Hollins, of Wimbledon in the London Borough of Merton and of Grenoside in the County of South Yorkshire.

Baroness Hollins founded the visual literacy charity Books Beyond Words in 1989 to produce word free books for people with learning disabilities. She is chair and series editor for Beyond Words.

Baroness Hollins has published extensively on the topic of learning disabilities.

She was President of the Royal College of Psychiatrists from 2005 to 2008, succeeded by Dinesh Bhugra. From 2012 to 2013 she was president of the British Medical Association and was on the BMA Board of Science from 2013 to 2016. In 2014 Pope Francis appointed her a member of the newly created Pontifical Commission for the Protection of Minors. The Baroness chaired the Scientific Advisory Board of the Centre for Child ProtectionCentre for Child Protectionat the Pontifical Gregorian University in Rome for 8 years and she was President of the Royal Medical Benevolent Fund from 2020 to 2024. Baroness Hollins was President of the Royal College of Occupational Therapists from 2018-2024 and she became President of the Catholic Union of Great Britain in November 2023.

Baroness Hollins successfully tabled an amendment to the Health and Care Act in 2012 which introduced parity for mental and physical health and mental and physical illness.

In 2011 she gave evidence to the Leveson Inquiry about the harassment and intrusion into family life caused by members of the media following her daughter’s serious injury in 2005.

On 17 March 2022, Baroness Hollins put forward an amendment to the Health and Care Bill in the House of Lords to pass The Oliver McGowan mandatory training into law. The Health and Care Act 2022 introduced a statutory requirement that regulated service providers must ensure their staff receive learning disability and autism training appropriate to their role.

In 2019 Baroness Hollins was appointed by the Secretary of State for Health and Social Care to chair the Oversight Panel to oversee Independent Care, Education and Treatment Reviews of people placed in Long Term Segregation. On 8 November 2023 Baroness Hollins published her final report "My heart breaks – solitary confinement in hospital has no therapeutic benefit for people with a learning disability and autistic people". The report highlights people with a learning disability and/or autistic people who experience enforced isolation in mental health and specialist learning disability hospitals.

== Personal life ==
Hollins is married to Martin Hollins. She is the mother of four children including Abigail Witchalls, who was stabbed and left paralysed in 2005, and has a son, Nigel. She is a Roman Catholic.

Professional and academic associations
| Preceded by Mike Shooter | President of the Royal College of Psychiatrists; 2005-2008 | Succeeded by Dinesh Bhugra |
| Preceded by Dame Parveen Kumar | President of the Royal Medical Benevolent Fund; 2020-2024 | Succeeded by Jane Dacre |
