= Stabbing of Abigail Witchalls =

2005 stabbing attack in Surrey, England

- Location: 51.277°N 0.378°W; Little Bookham, Surrey, England
- Date: 20 April 2005
- Target: Abigail Witchalls
- Attack type: Stabbing
- Weapon: Knife
- Injuries: 1 (Abigail Witchalls)
- Perpetrator: Richard Cazaly

The stabbing of Abigail Witchalls was a crime in England in 2005 that left the victim, a pregnant woman, paralysed.

== Abigail Witchalls ==
Born Abigail Hollins on 25 November 1978, the daughter of Dr. Martin Hollins and his wife, life peer Sheila Hollins, she came from a committed Roman Catholic family with ties to the Lay Community of St Benedict. She married Benoit Witchalls on 12 October 2002.

== Stabbing ==
On 20 April 2005, Witchalls, while out walking with her 21-month-old son Joseph in Surrey, was attacked by an unknown man, and was stabbed in the neck. She was pregnant at the time. She was found by a neighbour, and taken to hospital. She was paralysed and unable to speak, and remained in intensive care for several weeks, communicating with her family and police by blinking. Police arrested three people, but later released them. She was initially treated at St George's Hospital, Tooting, – where her mother Dr Sheila Hollins worked, and was working that day – then transferred to the Royal National Orthopaedic Hospital, Stanmore for rehabilitation.

On 28 April 2005, a 23-year-old garden centre worker, Richard Cazaly, who lived close to the scene of the attack, took an overdose. He had driven to Scotland two days earlier and died at the Edinburgh Royal Infirmary on 30 April of liver failure. In a suicide note to his girlfriend, Cazaly wrote: "To my dearest Nessa, I am so, so sorry! I guess there is 2 of me. I'm very scared but it'll all be over soon! And everyone will be better off. I don't remember what happened but I'm scared I did it. You deserve better. Your mum will look after you. Tell her I'm so sorry for all of this. All my love always & 4ever." The note does not specifically mention Abigail Witchalls. On 18 May 2005, Witchalls' husband, Benoit, was interviewed on BBC's Crimewatch programme, and said that he and his wife felt no anger towards the attacker.

Discussing his wife's future, he said, "People live wonderful lives paralysed from the neck down. Our expectations have had to change drastically in the last three weeks, but that's not to say that we're not still going to live peaceful lives, with a family." Three weeks later it was announced that her unborn baby was developing normally. Witchalls' second son, Dominic Adrian, was born five weeks early on 11 November 2005. The birth was a natural one, and it was announced that she was breastfeeding, and had regained some use of her right arm.

On 22 November 2005, the police said that if Cazaly had been arrested in time, he would have been charged with attempted murder, and that they considered the case solved, despite the victim's failure to pick him out in a photograph identity parade.

== Recovery ==
In July 2006, Witchalls and her family went on a pilgrimage to Lourdes, France to seek spiritual support. It was announced that a specially adapted bungalow was being built for her, and that she hoped eventually to return to teaching.

In April 2009, Witchalls dictated a chapter for a book about Lourdes. The Daily Telegraph, reproduced the chapter. Witchalls had regained her speech once taken off a ventilator in 2005.

Witchalls gave birth to a healthy daughter, Rebecca Grace, at St George's Hospital, Tooting, on 6 June 2010.
