= Jack Drescher =

American psychiatrist and psychoanalyst

- Born: 1951 (age 74–75)
- Education: Brooklyn College (BA); University of Michigan (MD)
- Occupations: Psychiatrist, psychoanalyst
- Scientific career
- Fields: Psychiatry, psychoanalysis
- Website: jackdreschermd.net

Jack Drescher (born 1951) is an American psychiatrist and psychoanalyst known for his work on sexual orientation and gender identity.

== Education and affiliations ==
Drescher earned a B.A. in biology from Brooklyn College in 1972 and a M.D. from University of Michigan Medical School in 1980. He completed an internship in psychiatry at St. Vincent's Hospital & Medical Center and a residency at SUNY Downstate Medical Center. Drescher trained in psychoanalysis at the William Alanson White Institute, where he is a training and supervising analyst. He is a faculty member and senior psychoanalytic consultant at the Columbia University Center for Psychoanalytic Training and Research, clinical professor of psychiatry at Columbia University College of Physicians and Surgeons and an adjunct professor at New York University postdoctoral program in psychotherapy and psychoanalysis.

Drescher is a Distinguished Life Fellow of the American Psychiatric Association. He is a member of the American College of Psychiatrists and the International Academy of Sex Research. He is a past president of the Group for the Advancement of Psychiatry and a past president of the New York County Psychiatric Society. He is emeritus editor of the Journal of Gay & Lesbian Mental Health.

== Ex-gays and conversion therapy ==
Drescher was an early professional critic of the ex-gay movement and conversion therapy, calling it "questionable in its efficacy" and citing potential harms of therapy to suppress or change sexual orientation. In addition to writing about the ethical concerns, Drescher has likened attempts to suggest there is a professional debate about this to creationism: "You create the impression to the public as if there was a debate in the profession, which there is not." Drescher was one those who spoke out after Robert Spitzer in 2003 published his findings that some gay people can alter their orientation. Spitzer in 2012 repudiated the 2003 study's conclusions.

== Gender identity ==
Drescher was a member of the American Psychiatric Association DSM-5 Workgroup on Sexual and Gender Identity Disorders. His subworkgroup was responsible for revising the DSM-IV-TR diagnosis of Gender Identity Disorder to the DSM-5 diagnosis of Gender Dysphoria. He was section editor of the chapter on Gender Dysphoria in the 2022 text revision of the DSM-5 or DSM-5-TR.

He was also a member of the World Health Organization Working Group on the Classification of Sexual Disorders and Sexual Health which revised the sex and gender diagnoses in WHO's International Classification of Diseases (ICD-11). That working group's recommendation was to rename the diagnoses "Gender Incongruence" and to move the GI diagnoses out of the mental disorders section of ICD into a new chapter called "Conditions Related to Sexual Health".

== Selected publications ==
- Homosexuality, gay and lesbian identities, and homosexual behavior. Jack Drescher, William Byne. In Sadock BJ, Sadock VA, Ruiz P (Eds), Kaplan and Sadock’s Comprehensive Textbook of Psychiatry, Tenth Edition. Wolters Kluwer, Philadelphia, PA, (2017), pp. 1982-2013.
- Gender identity, gender variance and gender dysphoria. Jack Drescher, William Byne. In Sadock BJ, Sadock VA, Ruiz P (Eds), Kaplan and Sadock’s Comprehensive Textbook of Psychiatry, Tenth Edition. Wolters Kluwer, Philadelphia, PA, (2017), pp. 2023–2039.
- Gender diagnoses. In Legato MJ (Ed), Principles of Gender-Specific Medicine: Gender in the Genomic Era, Third Edition. Academic Press (Elsevier), London, (2017), pp. 17-26.
- Trauma and psychoanalysis: Hierarchies of suffering. In: Petrucelli J, Schoen S (Eds.) The Unknowable, the Unspeakable, and the Unsprung: Psychoanalytic Perspectives on Truth, Scandal, Secrets and Lies. Routledge: New York and London, (2017), pp. 61–68.
- Revising the ICD-10 Mental and Behavioural Disorders classification of sexuality and gender identity based on current scientific evidence, best clinical practices, and human rights considerations. Reed GM, Drescher J, Krueger RB, Atalla E, Cochran SD, First MB, Cohen-Kettenis PT, et al. World Psychiatry, (2016), 15:205–221.
- The growing regulation of conversion therapy. Drescher J, Schwartz A, Casoy, F, McIntosh CA, Hurley, B, Ashely K, et al. Journal of Medical Regulation, (2016), 102(2):7-12.
- Gender incongruence of childhood in the ICD-11: Controversies, proposal, and rationale. Drescher J, Cohen-Kettenis PT, Reed GM. Lancet Psychiatry, (2016), 3:297-304.
- New Italian lesbian, gay and bisexual psychotherapy guidelines: A review. Lingiardi V, Nardelli N, Drescher J. International Review of Psychiatry, (2015), 27(5):405-415.
- Queer diagnoses revisited: The past and future of homosexuality and gender diagnoses in DSM and ICD. International Review of Psychiatry, (2015), 27(5):386-395.
- Can sexual orientation be changed? Journal of Gay & Lesbian Mental Health, (2015), 19(1):84-93.
- Ethical Issues in Treating LGBT Patients. In Sadler J, van Staden CW, Fulford, KWM (Eds) Oxford Handbook of Psychiatric Ethics. Oxford University Press: Oxford, 2015, pp. 180-192.
- Ethical issues raised by the treatment of gender variant prepubescent children. Drescher J, Pula J. Hastings Center Report, (2014), 44, Suppl 4:S17-22.
- Proposed declassification of disease categories related to sexual orientation in ICD-11: Rationale and evidence from the Working Group on Sexual Disorders and Sexual Health. Cochran SD, Drescher J, Kismodi E, Giami A, García-Moreno C, Reed, GM. Bulletin of the World Health Organization, (2014), 92:672–679.
- Are the kids all right? Avuncular reflections on the gayby boom. Journal of Gay & Lesbian Mental Health, (2014), 18(2):222-229.
- Treatment of Lesbian, Gay, Bisexual, and Transgender Patients. In Hales RE, Yudofsky SC, Roberts L (Eds) American Psychiatric Press Textbook of Psychiatry, Sixth Edition. American Psychiatric Press, Washington, DC, (2014), pp. 1293-1318.
- Controversies in gender diagnoses. LGBT Health (journal), (2014), 1(1):9-15.
- Treating Transgender Children and Adolescents. Drescher J. & Byne, W., editors (2013), New York: Routledge.
- The LGBT Casebook. Levounis, P., Drescher J. & Barber, M., editors (2012), Washington DC: American Psychiatric Publishing.
- Minding the body: Situating gender diagnoses in the ICD-11. Drescher J, Cohen-Kettenis PT, Winter S. International Review of Psychiatry, (2012), 24(6): 568–577.
- The removal of homosexuality from the DSM: Its impact on today’s marriage equality debate. Journal of Gay & Lesbian Mental Health, (2012), 16(2):124-135.
- Queer Diagnoses: Parallels and Contrasts in the History of Homosexuality, Gender Variance, and the Diagnostic and Statistical Manual (DSM). Archives of Sexual Behavior (2010), 39:427–460.
- Homosexuality, gay and lesbian identities, and homosexual behavior. Jack Drescher, William Byne. In Sadock BJ, Sadock VA, Ruiz P (Eds), Kaplan and Sadock’s Comprehensive Textbook of Psychiatry, Ninth Edition (2009). Lippincott Williams & Wilkins, Baltimore, MD, pp. 2060–2090.
- When Politics Distorts Science: What Mental Health Professionals Can Do. Journal of Gay and Lesbian Mental Health (2009), 13(3):21-226
- Childhood Gender Nonconformity and the Development of Adult Homosexuality. Mathy, R. & Drescher, J., editors. (2009), New York: Routledge.
- A History of Homosexuality and Organized Psychoanalysis. Journal of the American Academy of Psychoanalysis and Dynamic Psychiatry (2008), 36(3):443-460.
- From Bisexuality to Intersexuality: Rethinking Gender Categories. Contemporary Psychoanalysis (2007), 43(2):204-228.
- Transgender Subjectivities: A Clinician's Guide. Leli, U. & Drescher, J., editors. (2004), New York: Harrington Park Press.
- Addictions in the gay and lesbian community. Jeffrey R. Guss, Jack Drescher, editors. New York: Haworth Medical Press, c2000. ISBN 0-7890-1038-0
- British lesbian, gay, and bisexual psychologies: theory, research, and practice. Elizabeth Peel, Victoria Clarke, Jack Drescher, editors Binghamton, NY : Haworth Medical Press, c2007. ISBN 0-7890-3251-1
- Crystal meth and men who have sex with men: what mental health care professionals need to know. Milton L. Wainberg, Andrew J. Kolodny, Jack Drescher, editors. New York: Haworth Medical Press, c2006. ISBN 0-7890-3247-3
- Ex-Gay Research: Analyzing the Spitzer Study And Its Relation to Science, Religion, Politics, and Culture. Jack Drescher, Kenneth J. Zucker (Editors). Harrington Park Press ISBN 1-56023-557-8
- Gay and lesbian parenting. Deborah F. Glazer, Jack Drescher, editors. New York: Haworth Medical Press, c2001. ISBN 0-7890-1350-9
- A gay man's guide to prostate cancer. Gerald Perlman (Editor), Jack Drescher (Editor) Binghamton, NY: Haworth Medical Press, c2005. ISBN 1-56023-553-5
- Handbook of LGBT issues in community mental health. Ronald E. Hellman, Jack Drescher, Binghamton, NY: Haworth Medical Press, c2004. ISBN 0-7890-2309-1
- Mental health professions and homosexuality: international perspectives. Vittorio Lingiardi, Jack Drescher, editors. Binghamton, NY: Haworth Medical Press, c2003. ISBN 0-7890-2058-0
- Psychoanalytic therapy and the gay man. Jack Drescher. Hillsdale, NJ: Analytic Press, 1998. ISBN 0-88163-208-2
- Sexual and gender diagnoses of the Diagnostic and Statistical Manual (DSM): a reevaluation. Dan Karasic, Jack Drescher (Editor). New York: Haworth Press, c2005. ISBN 0-7890-3213-9
