= Dinesh Bhugra =

British psychiatrist

Dinesh Kumar Makhan Lal Bhugra CBE is a professor of mental health and diversity at the Institute of Psychiatry at King's College London. He is an honorary consultant psychiatrist at the South London and Maudsley NHS Foundation Trust and is former president of the Royal College of Psychiatrists. Bhugra was the president of the World Psychiatric Association (WPA) between 2014 and 2017 and the President of the British Medical Association in 2018–2019.

Bhugra became chair of the Mental Health Foundation in 2011, and was awarded his CBE in the 2012 New Year Honours for services to psychiatry following three years as the president of the Royal College of Psychiatrists

He is a well-known commentator on mental health issues. He has contributed to The Guardian, The Daily Telegraph, The Times (UK), the Financial Times, The Observer, The Huffington Post, the BBC News Magazine, The Times of India and The New York Times.

His research interests include topics across social and public health psychiatry: cross-cultural psychiatry, migrant mental health, professionalism in psychiatry, depression, psychosexual medicine, service provision and decision-making. He has become an important authority on these issues, having published over 180 papers in peer-reviewed journals, 100 editorials and invited papers, 90 book chapters and authored or edited 30 books.

== Honours and degrees ==
In addition to his CBE in the 2012 New Years Honours, Bhugra has received honours from the American Psychiatry Association, the American College of Psychiatrists, the Academy of Medical Sciences (Singapore), the British Association of Physicians of Indian Origin, the Hong Kong College of Psychiatrists and the International Medical Sciences Academy. He is on the Council of the Academy of Medical Educators and is a founding member of the Faculty of Medical Leadership and Management.

He has a PhD from the King's College London, an MPhil from Leicester University, an MSc (sociology) from South Bank University and an MA (social anthropology) from the University of London in addition to his MBBS from the Armed Forces Medical College at Poona University in India and the Licentiate in Medicine and Surgery from the Society of Apothecaries.

He is a fellow of the Royal College of Psychiatrists, the Royal Society of Medicine, the Royal College of Physicians, the Faculty of Public Health and the Royal College of Physicians of Edinburgh. On 12 November 2013, the Von Tauber Institute for Global Psychiatry at the Nassau University Medical Center at East Meadow, New York presented its annual Von Tauber Global Psychiatry Award to Bhugra, in recognition of his outstanding service and accomplishments in world psychiatry.

He is a former President of the British Medical Association.

== Academic work ==
He is the editor of the International Journal of Psychiatry, the International Review of Psychiatry and the International Journal of Culture and Mental Health and on the editorial board of 11 other journals including the British Journal of Psychiatry, the Indian Journal of Psychiatry and Global Mental Health. He is a prolific author/editor of over 30 books, 90 book chapters, 100 editorials and over 180 papers. These have included papers in The Lancet, British Medical Journal, British Journal of Psychiatry, American Journal of Psychiatry, Indian Journal of Psychiatry, Canadian Journal of Psychiatry and World Psychiatry.

He has been awarded research grants/position with the World Psychiatric Association, where he leads a 23-nation study regarding recruitment into psychiatry, the Medical Research Council, where he worked on a study assessing care of ethnic minorities and the Wellcome Trust, which funded research into the portrayal of mental illness in Hindi cinema through their history of medicine fellowships. He has presented the latter at the famous Gresham College.

== Education work ==
Bhugra sits on the Education Committee of the European Psychiatric Association and is currently leading an international research project covering recruitment of medical students into psychiatry across 23 countries funded by the World Psychiatric Association.

As vice-chair of the Academy of Medical Royal Colleges for Education from 2008 to 2011 he represented all UK doctors producing policy, strategies and reforms to improve medical education and training. This included reviewing current training programmes, including the Medical Education England Review of the Foundation Programme, medical professionalism, curricula and assessments. For the UK government, he co-chaired the Medical Programme Board alongside Dr Patricia Hamilton – the director for medical education at the Department of Health.

His published work includes many articles and books relating to medical and psychiatric training, with books including Management for Psychiatrists and Workplace-Based Assessments in Psychiatry . His books have received several commendations in recent years. His Textbook of Cultural Psychiatry won the 2012 Creative Scholarship Award from the Society for the Study of Psychiatry and Culture and was commended in the 2008 BMA Book Awards. His Mental Health of Refugees and Asylum Seekers book was highly commended in the 2011 BMA Awards.

As president (2008–2011) and dean (2003–2008) of the Royal College of Psychiatrists he led on education issues and introduced new curricula, new assessment schemes and made the MRCPsych examination accessible to psychiatry trainees across the globe.

== Personal life ==
Bhugra was born in Yamunanagar in India, where he won the National Science Talent Search Scholarship to attend medical school at the Armed Forces Medical College at Poona University. He studied at Mukand Lal National Higher Secondary School, Yamunanagar.

Bhugra is openly gay. He has been with his partner Mike for more than 30 years.

Professional and academic associations
Preceded by Sheila Hollins	President of the Royal College of Psychiatrists; 2008 to 2011	Succeeded by Dame Susan Bailey
