= A Rugrats Chanukah =

- Rugrats episode
- Promotional image featuring Grandpa Boris and the Rugrats lighting the Menorah.
- Episode no.: Season 4 Episode 1
- Directed by: Raymie Muzquiz
- Written by: Henry Gilroy; Steven Melching; Scott Murphy; Dan Hageman and Kevin Hageman; J. David Stem; David N. Weiss
- Production code: 999
- Original air date: December 4, 1996

Guest appearances
- Fyvush Finkel as Shlomo; Ron Leibman as Rabbi / Old Man; Alan Rachins as Lowell / Greek Bully / Donut Man; Alan Rosenberg as Mr. Dreidel / TV Announcer; Bruce Young Berman as Parade Crooner; Mt. Zion's Women Choir; Edie Lehmann - Choir Leader; Joan Beal; Susan Boyd; Linda Harmon; Luana Jackman; Susan McBride; Bobbi Page; Sally Stevens; Carmen Twillie

Episode chronology
← Previous "A Rugrats Passover"	Next → "Mother's Day"

"A Rugrats Chanukah" (titled onscreen as simply "Chanukah" and sometimes called the "Rugrats Chanukah Special") is the first episode of the fourth season of the American animated television series Rugrats (and the sixty-sixth episode overall). It first aired on Nickelodeon in the United States on December 4, 1996. The special tells the story of the Jewish holiday Chanukah through the eyes of the Rugrats, who imagine themselves as the main characters. Meanwhile, Grandpa Boris and his long-time rival, Shlomo, feud over who will play the lead in the local synagogue's Chanukah play. While many American children's television programs have Christmas specials, "A Rugrats Chanukah" is one of the first Chanukah specials of an American children's television series.

Raymie Muzquiz directed "A Rugrats Chanukah" from a script by J. David Stem and David N. Weiss. In 1992, Nickelodeon executives had pitched the idea of a Chanukah special to the production team, but the concept was revised and became the 1995 special "A Rugrats Passover". After production of the Passover episode wrapped, the crew returned to the Chanukah idea.

In its initial airing, "A Rugrats Chanukah" received a Nielsen rating of 7.9. Along with other episodes featuring Boris and his wife, the special attracted controversy when the Anti-Defamation League compared the character designs to antisemitic drawings from a 1930s Nazi newspaper.

== Plot ==
Abridged version of the episode published on Nicktoons' YouTube channel.

On Chanukah, Grandma Minka reads a book about the meaning of the holiday to the babies Tommy, Chuckie, Phil and Lil. The babies imagine that they are the story's characters; Judah (Tommy) is outraged by King "Antonica", who has taken over the Jewish kingdom and forced Greek culture on its inhabitants. Judah leads an army of Jewish "Maccababies" to war against Antonica's Seleucid Empire, emerging victorious. The story is left unfinished as Minka stops to help make latkes in the kitchen with her daughter Didi.

Meanwhile, Grandpa Boris is furious that Shlomo, a rival from his youth in Russia, is pictured in the local newspaper for playing the Greek king in the local synagogue's Chanukah play, where Boris is portraying Judah. The babies find out about Shlomo and form the impression that he truly is the Greek king, whom they dub the "Meanie of Chanukah". At the play that night, they attempt to storm on stage to defeat the "Meanie of Chanukah", but are stopped and taken into the synagogue's nursery. Angelica is in the nursery already and, vehement in her desire to watch a Christmas special that is airing that night, convinces the babies to help her break out and steal a television set from the custodian's office.

Boris and Shlomo begin fighting on stage during the play, interrupting the production and inciting an intermission. Backstage, Shlomo, and Boris argue once more, with Boris mentioning Shlomo's dedication to his business pursuits over familial values. Shlomo informs Boris that he and his late wife were unable to bear children, making Boris feel sympathy for his rival. Angelica sprints backstage, bumping into Shlomo and inadvertently destroying the television set, causing her to cry. Shlomo unsuccessfully tries to console her, but eventually lets Boris take over. Tommy hands Shlomo the Chanukah story book Minka read to the babies earlier; Boris convinces Shlomo to read it to the children. In the conclusion of the story, the Maccabees rededicate the Holy Temple, and discover that there is only enough oil to light the Temple's eternal flame for one day; miraculously, it remains lit for eight. Shlomo's reciting dissolves both the babies' assertion of him as the "Meanie of Chanukah" and his and Boris' rivalry.

== Production ==
Nickelodeon executives first pitched the idea of making a Chanukah special to the Rugrats production team in 1992. Paul Germain, the show's co-creator, responded with the concept of a Passover special instead, as he considered it to be a "funny idea" and of "historical interest". "A Rugrats Passover" was completed in 1995; the show was one of the first animated television series to produce a special for a Jewish holiday. After production wrapped on "A Rugrats Passover", the crew considered creating the Chanukah special that Nickelodeon had originally pitched. The episode was written by David Stem and David Weiss, and directed by Raymie Muzquiz. By the time Weiss came to write the teleplay, he had abandoned Christianity and converted to Judaism.

The special was featured on the VHS tape "A Rugrats Chanukah", which was released on October 7, 1997, by Nickelodeon and Paramount Home Video. On August 31, 2004, Paramount also released a DVD compilation titled Rugrats Holiday Celebration, which featured several holiday-themed episodes of Rugrats, including "A Rugrats Chanukah". On September 23, 2011, "A Rugrats Chanukah" was released on the Rugrats: Season 4 DVD by Amazon.com. On February 6, 2018, "A Rugrats Chanukah" was released on the Rugrats: Season 4 DVD by Paramount Home Media Distribution. Sarah Willson adapted the episode into the book, The Rugrats' Book of Chanukah, illustrated by Barry Goldberg and published by Simon & Schuster in 1997.

== Reception ==
=== Critical response ===
"The babies acting out their own version of the story is enough to entertain a child of any religious denomination, so learning the historical meaning behind latkes and dreidels is just an added bonus."
—TV Guide

"A Rugrats Chanukah" was originally broadcast on December 4, 1996, on Nickelodeon. It was repeated twice that same night, the episode received a Nielsen rating of 7.9 in the show's target demographic of children aged 2–11. On December 1, 2001, CBS broadcast the episode for the first time on its network, at 8:30 p.m. Eastern Time. Carrying a TV-Y parental rating, it followed the Rugrats Christmas special, "The Santa Experience". Nickelodeon has aired the episode throughout subsequent holiday seasons.

"A Rugrats Chanukah" became one of the most popular episodes of Rugrats. Delia O'Hera of the Chicago Sun-Times called it a "multigenerational tale". Judith Pearl, in her book The Chosen Image: Television's Portrayal of Jewish Themes and Characters, described the episode as a "fun [treatment] of Chanukah". Chuck Barney of Knight Ridder and the Tribune News Service considered the episode a "hilariously imaginative take on the Chanukah legend".

In a 1999 issue of TV Guide, "A Rugrats Chanukah" was listed at number 5 in their "10 Best Classic Family Holiday Specials". TV Guide later wrote that "Nickelodeon's Rugrats secured its place in television history" with the episode, opining that it could "entertain a child of any religious denomination". Ted Cox of the Daily Herald said that although the episode was not as good as the show's Passover special—which he considered "among the best holiday TV specials ever produced"—it was "still noteworthy". DVD Talk reviewer Francis Rizzo III wrote that the special "has a great historical opening". In Flickipedia: Perfect Films for Every Occasion, Holiday, Mood, Ordeal, and Whim, Michael Atkinson and Laurel Shifrin said that the special was "... a richer meal, even, for parents than for tykes".

=== Anti-Defamation League controversy ===
"A Rugrats Chanukah", along with other Rugrats episodes featuring Boris and his wife, Minka, attracted controversy when the Anti-Defamation League (ADL) charged that the two characters resembled antisemitic drawings that were featured in a 1930s Nazi newspaper. Nickelodeon's then-president, Albie Hecht (himself Jewish), professed bewilderment and called the accusation absurd. The controversy resurfaced in 1998 after the ADL made the same claims about Boris' appearance in a Rugrats comic strip that ran in newspapers during the Jewish New Year. The organization was also offended by the character's recitation of the Mourner's Kaddish in the strip. Unlike Hecht, Nickelodeon's new president, Herb Scannell, agreed with the criticism and apologized, promising never to run the character or the strip again.

== See also ==
- 1996 in American television
- Judaism in Rugrats
- "A Rugrats Passover"
- List of Rugrats episodes
