= Journal of Gay & Lesbian Mental Health =

- Discipline: Psychiatry
- Language: English
- Edited by: Mary E. Barber, Alan Schwartz

Publication details
- Former names: Journal of Gay & Lesbian Psychotherapy
- History: 1988-present
- Publisher: Routledge
- Frequency: Quarterly

Standard abbreviations
- ISO 4: J. Gay Lesbian Ment. Health

Indexing
- ISSN: 1935-9705 (print); 1935-9713 (web)
- LCCN: 2007214197
- OCLC no.: 83831862

The Journal of Gay & Lesbian Mental Health is a peer-reviewed medical journal published by Routledge. It is the official journal for AGLP, the Association of LGBTQ+ Psychiatrists. The editor-in-chief is Chris Mcintosh. Former editors include Philip Bialer, Mary E. Barber (Columbia College of Physicians and Surgeons), Alan Schwartz (William Alanson White Institute), and Jack Drescher. The journal was established in 1988 as the Journal of Gay & Lesbian Psychotherapy, before obtaining its current title in 2007. It covers LGBT mental health with a focus on clinical issues. The journal is abstracted and indexed in: PsycINFO, LGBT Life, SOCIndex, Academic Search Premier, Family Index Abstracts, Studies in Women & Gender Abstracts, and Gender Watch-Softline.
