= Let My Babies Go! =

Book by Sarah Willson

Let My Babies Go! A Passover Story
- Author: Sarah Wilson
- Illustrator: Barry Goldberg
- Language: English
- Series: Rugrats
- Genre: Children's literature
- Publisher: Simon Spotlight; Simon & Schuster
- Publication date: 1998
- Publication place: United States
- ISBN: 978-0-689-81979-7

Let My Babies Go! A Passover Story is a picture book and children's literature novelization of the Rugrats episode "A Rugrats Passover". The novel was written by Sarah Wilson and featured illustrations by Barry Goldberg. It was published by Simon Spotlight in 1998. The book follows the Rugrats—Tommy, Chuckie, Phil, his twin sister Lil, and Angelica—as they learn of the origin of Passover and imagine that they are characters featured in it. A poster based on the book was inducted into the Sherwin Miller Museum of Jewish Art in Tulsa, Oklahoma, in 2007.

== Plot summary ==
Let My Babies Go! features the Rugrats—Tommy, Chuckie, Phil, his twin sister Lil, and Angelica—as they are trapped in an attic with Tommy's grandfather Boris. Boris explains to them the story of Passover to pass the time; as he does so, the Rugrats imagine that they are the characters featured within the story. Tommy is portrayed as Moses, as he rebels against the Pharaoh of Egypt (Angelica). Through casting various plagues upon Egypt, Moses is able to free the Hebrews from slavery and they flee across the Red Sea.

== Legacy ==
In 2007, the Sherwin Miller Museum of Jewish Art in Tulsa, Oklahoma, unveiled a new exhibit which galleried biblical images in art and pop culture, including a poster for Let My Babies Go! Other items highlighted in the gallery included a promotional poster for The Simpsons episode "Simpsons Bible Stories" and a vintage Superman comic book entitled "The Red-Headed Beatle of 1000 B.C.", featuring the character of Jimmy Olsen traveling throughout biblical times.
