= International Review of Psychiatry =

- Discipline: Psychiatry, psychology
- Language: English
- Edited by: Dinesh Bhugra; Margaret Chisolm

Publication details
- History: 1989–present
- Publisher: Taylor & Francis on behalf of the Institute of Psychiatry
- Frequency: Bimonthly
- Impact factor: 2.240 (2016)

Standard abbreviations
- ISO 4: Int. Rev. Psychiatry

Indexing
- ISSN: 0954-0261 (print); 1369-1627 (web)
- OCLC no.: 226001786

Links
- Journal homepage; Online access; Online archive

The International Review of Psychiatry is a bimonthly peer-reviewed medical journal published by Taylor & Francis on behalf of the Institute of Psychiatry (King's College London). The editors-in-chief are Dinesh Bhugra (Institute of Psychiatry/Maudsley Hospital) and Margaret Chisolm (Johns Hopkins University). The journal was established in 1989.

== Abstracting and indexing ==
The journal is abstracted and indexed in:

- Applied Social Science Index and Abstracts
- BIOSIS Previews
- Current Contents/Social and Behavioural Sciences
- Embase/EMCare
- Index Medicus/MEDLINE/PubMed
- PsycINFO/Psychological Abstracts
- Scopus
- Social Sciences Citation Index
- Sociological Abstracts
- Studies on Women and Gender Abstracts

According to the Journal Citation Reports, the journal has a 2016 impact factor of 2.240.
