= Pitch (filmmaking) =

Brief presentation of an idea for film and/or television series

In filmmaking, a pitch is a concise verbal (and sometimes visual) presentation of an idea for a film or TV series generally made by a screenwriter or film director to a film producer or studio executive in the hope of attracting development finance to pay for the writing of a screenplay.

The expression is borrowed from "sales pitch". A pitch is used throughout different stages of production, such as casting and distribution, as well as to urge film producers to further fund a project. Filmmakers who devise a pitch tend to manufacture a production package, which is handed out to each potential investor during the pitch. The package contains the basic information for the filmmaker's project, such as a plot synopsis and budgeting values. Sometimes, filmmakers will produce an independent pitch trailer as a part of the package to help potential financiers better visualize the project and the filmmaker's vision.

Though pitches are usually made on the basis of a full script or teleplay, animated productions for both film and television are often pitched on the basis of storyboards alone. For example, the animated television show Phineas and Ferb was pitched from a storyboard. Co-founders of the project, Dan Povenmire and Jeff "Swampy" Marsh, needed to convince overseas executives for The Walt Disney Company to greenlight the series, so they drew a storyboard and recorded it as a reel. They then mixed it and dubbed it over with sound effects, voices, and narrative, then sent the recording to the executives, who accepted it.

Television pitches can also be devised by the network or company that produces the program. Certain networks are pitched the idea of including a character in a series in order to boost ratings. Such pitches have been used with "Oliver" in The Brady Bunch and "Luke" on Growing Pains. Networks also try to force their ideas on series' producers through their pitches, though their approach is business-oriented and their ideas are generally not favored by writers and viewers. In 1992, the crew of the animated series Rugrats was approached by Nickelodeon, which pitched the idea of a Rugrats Hanukkah special. Paul Germain, co-creator of the series, responded by suggesting a passover special, which he dubbed a "funny idea". After they closed production for that special, they began considering the Hanukkah special and eventually created it in 1996 as the episode "A Rugrats Chanukah".
