= David N. Weiss =

American screenwriter and film director

David N. Weiss is an American screenwriter and film director. He is the screenwriter of All Dogs Go to Heaven and Rock-a-Doodle and co-writer of The Rugrats Movie, Shrek 2, Clockstoppers, Jimmy Neutron: Boy Genius, Rugrats in Paris: The Movie, The Smurfs, its sequel, and Disenchanted with writing partner, J. David Stem. He has also written for television shows such as Mission Hill, Cybill, and Roundhouse.

== Early life ==
Weiss grew up in Ventura, California. Weiss was raised in a Reform Jewish household and converted to Christianity as a teenager. He reverted back to Judaism in adulthood after meeting observant Jews while in Ireland.

== Career ==
Weiss wrote and directed several award-winning shorts and wrote the screenplay for the MGM classic, All Dogs Go to Heaven. With his writing partner, J. David Stem, Weiss served as a head writer for Rugrats and wrote the holiday special A Rugrats Chanukah.

In 2005, Weiss was elected vice president of the Writers Guild of America, West. In 2009, after serving two terms as vice president, Weiss was elected secretary-treasurer of the Writers Guild of America, West.

Weiss has also written three books for children, including Kay Thompson's bestseller, Eloise in Hollywood (with Stem, for Simon & Schuster). He is a patron of the Insight Film Festival. He has taught at the Ma'aleh School of Television, Film and the Arts in Jerusalem, Israel.

== Filmography ==
=== Film ===
Year	Title	Credit	Notes
1989	All Dogs Go to Heaven	Screenplay by Story by	Story with Don Bluth, Ken Cromar, Gary Goldman, Larry Leker, Linda Miller, Monica Parker, John Pomeroy, Guy Schulman and David J. Steinberg
1991	Rock-A-Doodle	Screenplay by Story by	Story with Don Bluth, John Pomeroy, David J. Steinberg, T.J. Kuenster and Gary Goldman
1998	The Rugrats Movie	Written by	With J. David Stem
2000	Rugrats in Paris: The Movie	Written by	With J. David Stem, Jill Gorey, Barbara Herndon and Kate Boutilier
2001	Jimmy Neutron: Boy Genius	Screenplay by	With John A. Davis, Steve Oedekerk and J. David Stem
2002	Clockstoppers	Screenplay by Story by	With Rob Hedden and J. David Stem
2004	Shrek 2	Screenplay by	With Andrew Adamson, Joe Stillman and J. David Stem
2005	Are We There Yet?	Screenplay by	With Steven Gary Banks, Claudia Grazioso and J. David Stem
2007	Daddy Day Camp	Screenplay by	With Geoff Rodkey and J. David Stem
2011	The Smurfs	Screenplay by Story by	With J. David Stem, Jay Scherick and David Ronn
2013	The Smurfs 2	Screenplay by Story by	With J. David Stem, Jay Scherick, David Ronn and Karey Kirkpatrick
2022	Disenchanted	Story by	Story with J. David Stem and Richard LaGravenese
TBA	Monkey Quest	Directed by Screenplay by	With Naoto Ohshima and Joseph Chou

=== TV series ===
Year	Title	Notes
1990–1991	Carol & Company	Writer (3 episodes)
1992–1993	Roundhouse	Writer (24 episodes)
1996–1997	Rugrats	Writer (3 episodes); Co-producer (18 episodes)
1997–1998	Cybill	Writer (3 episodes)
1999–2000	Mission Hill	Writer (2 episodes); Co-producer (6 episodes)
