= List of Rugrats characters =

Characters from the Rugrats franchise

Rugrats includes a large array of characters: family, friends, extended relatives, townspeople, and fictional characters. This is a list of characters from the original 1990s Nickelodeon animated television series, its various movies, and the 2020s Rugrats Reboot.

== Main ==
- Thomas Malcolm "Tommy" Pickles (voiced by E. G. Daily and Tami Holbrook in the unaired pilot) is the older son of Stu and Didi Pickles (who is of the Jewish faith) and serves as the series' protagonist. Tommy is a 1-year-old, meaning that he was born on August 11, 1990, and in the episode "Stu-Maker's Elves", it's implied that he remembers the day of his birth. He is presented as a child, who lives with his parents and younger brother, Dil. Many episodes take place in the Pickles family home and are centered around him and his family. In the series premiere episode, "Tommy's First Birthday", he is a 1-year-old and seems to remain that age throughout the entirety of the show (despite hitting developmental milestones). Tommy is the youngest of the babies until the birth of his brother, Dylan, in The Rugrats Movie (1998). Tommy is bald, has only one tooth, and is most commonly seen wearing a light blue t-shirt that shows his stomach and diaper with no shoes. As an infant, Tommy is often seen crawling and walking somewhat unsteadily and pigeon-toed. He uses his diaper as a pocket, storing his screwdriver, among other things he finds. Tommy is a brave child with a strong sense of justice, always eager for an adventure and not afraid to stand up for what is right. His best friends are Chuckie and his dog Spike. In the episode "Mother's Day", it is indicated that Tommy was born premature and spent the first week or two of his life in an incubator, which explains why he is so brave and doesn't take life for granted.
- Charles Crandall Norbert "Chuckie" Finster, Jr. (voiced by Christine Cavanaugh from 1991 to 2002 and Nancy Cartwright from 2002–present) is the son of Charles "Chas" Finster, a widower and bureaucrat, and his late spouse, Melinda Finster, and is Tommy's best friend. Unlike Tommy, Chuckie is clumsy and timid; he rarely expresses any desire to go on one of the babies' adventures, instead listing all the reasons they should not go on one. Whenever Tommy and Dil's cousin Angelica try to bully them, Chuckie unquestionably accepts her treatment and gives in to any possible demands. Chuckie is 2 years old, making him the eldest of the babies, therefore he is the first of them to be toilet trained. This would mean that he was born in 1989, and like Tommy, according to the episode "Stu-Maker's Elves", it's implied that he also remembers the day of his birth. He has curly red hair, purple-framed glasses, buckteeth, and freckles and wears a red and blue shirt with a picture of Saturn on it. In addition, he wears lime green and yellow shorts, yellow socks, and red sneakers with untied laces. In Rugrats in Paris: The Movie, Chuckie adds a Japanese stepmother, Kira Watanabe—who later adopts him—and a stepsister, Kimi. He also says his first word to the grown-ups when he stops Coco LaBouche from marrying his father. His character design was loosely based on Mark Mothersbaugh, the lead composer for the series.
- Angelica Charlotte Pickles (voiced by Cheryl Chase) is the daughter of Tommy and Dil's 3-year-old bossy older (and only female) cousin, Drew and Charlotte's bratty daughter, Lou's greedy granddaughter and Stu and Didi's spoiled niece. Angelica serves as the series' villain, regularly threatening the babies physically, verbally, manually, or sometimes psychologically and lying to them for her own amusement. In her own home, Angelica remains an only child, who lives with her workaholic mom and busy working father, who shower her with toys and admiration. Without any parental guidance or boundaries, Angelica has largely been left to determine for herself what is right and wrong, with her idea of "right" normally being what she wants. She is materialistic, devious, and self-centered. Though she torments the babies, Angelica stands up for them against others and expresses a genuine desire to be friends with them. Angelica has blonde hair, with pigtails styled with purple bows, and wears a purple dress with a red long-sleeved shirt, blue tights, red socks, and purple sneakers. She is also 3 years old, meaning that she was born in 1988.
- Phillip Richard "Phil" DeVille and Lillian Marie "Lil" DeVille (both voiced by Kath Soucie) are the children of Howard and Betty DeVille. They live next door to Tommy and are Fraternal Twins, with Lil older than Phil by two minutes. Often named "Lil and Phil", they share many similarities, including the same hairstyle and love for dirt and eating bugs and earthworms. They argue with one another frequently, in which they call each other by their full name. The two have brown hair and wear matching outfits of teal jumpers with yellow ducks on them, and pink-striped undershirts. Phil's outfit has blue shorts and teal sneakers, while Lil has a dress and pink sneakers. Looking so much alike, they are often mistaken for one another by adults; the only notable facial difference between the two is that Phil's earlobes are attached while Lil's are not. They are both the same age as Tommy.
- Susanna Yvonne "Susie" Carmichael (voiced by Cree Summer, understudied by E. G. Daily in "The Last Babysitter" and "Angelica's Birthday") is the younger daughter of Randy and Dr. Lucy Carmichael, and Tommy's neighbor. Her family purchases a home on Tommy's street in "Meet the Carmichaels" and their mothers become close friends. Susie gets along well with the babies, despite the age difference, and considers them to be her friends. She does not often get along with Angelica, though she makes a conscious effort to be nice to her. Like her mother, Susie excels in many aspects of her life and has a kind and warm attitude, her only real character flaw being her competitiveness. She is African-American with black afro-textured hair, which is styled into three braids and decorated with red hairclips and ties, and wears a yellow and purple dress with purple leggings, white lace socks, and red slippers. While she was the same age as Angelica in the original series, she is 2 years old in the reboot, the same age as Chuckie, meaning that in the 2020s version, she was born in 2019.
- Kimiko "Kimi" Watanabe-Finster (voiced by Dionne Quan from 2000 to 2008 and Charlet Chung from 2021–present) is the child of Hiro Watanabe and Kira Watanabe and is Chuckie's stepsister. Her mother marries Chuckie's father Chas in Rugrats in Paris: The Movie and he later adopts her, assuming the role of her father. Kimi's boldness enables her to interact easily with the other babies, especially Tommy. She is protective of her older brother, while at the same time encouraging him to stand up for himself. She is Japanese-American and has black hair styled into three ponytails, and held together by red hair ties, with bangs. She wears a yellow dress with a purple cat on it, a pink t-shirt, and purple cowgirl boots. While she was 1½ in the original series, she is now 3 years old in the reboot, making her the same age as Angelica and therefore she was born in 2018. Kimi turned 2 in the original series final "Kimi Takes the Cake".
- Dylan Prescott "Dil" Pickles (voiced by Tara Strong, credited as "Charendoff" in the film version) is the younger son of Stu and Didi Pickles, and Tommy's younger brother. In the The Rugrats Movie, he was born in 1998 and remains a newborn for much of the series, meaning he rarely partakes in adventures along with the other babies and is often seen drooling, crying, or babbling. Because of his young age, most of the time Dill cannot understand the babies and the babies cannot understand him.
- Spike (voiced by Frank Welker, Michael Bell in a dream sequence in the episode "In the Dreamtime" and Bruce Willis in Rugrats Go Wild) is the Pickles' family dog. Though he appears in almost every episode of the series, he is not usually featured as a main part of episodes. Tommy claims him to be his best "animal" friend. The character is considered a main character in the series, appearing in almost three-quarters of all of the episodes, though he usually does not come along when the Rugrats venture to new locations. It is mentioned in "Spike Runs Away" that his breed is fictional "Siberian tiger Hound". As shown in The Rugrats Movie and Rugrats Go Wild, Spike is very protective of the babies, as he sees them as part of his family.

== Adults ==
- Stuart Louis "Stu" Pickles (voiced by Jack Riley as an adult in 1991–2008, E. G. Daily as a baby in "Sour Pickles", Tress MacNeille as a baby in "Fountain of Youth" and Tommy Dewey in 2021–present) is Tommy and Dill's easygoing father and brother of Drew. He is an absent-minded toy inventor who only wants to be a good provider for his family. He is married to Didi Pickles. It is implied in the All Grown Up special that Stu's birthday is on or around October 23, as his birthday falls on the cusp of Libra and Scorpio. In each Rugrats film, either Stu's actions or inventions help sets the story in motion, and by the story's end, he somehow manages to save the day (particularly, in the first and third films). He is Chas' best friend since childhood.
- Diane "Didi" Pickles (née Kropotkin) (voiced by Melanie Chartoff in 1991–2008 and Ashley Rae Spillers in 2021–present) is Tommy and Dil's mother. A former part-time schoolteacher, current child psychologist and married to Stu. It is revealed that she is coulrophobic, just like Chuckie Finster. Didi is also a Russian-Jewish American with two Russian-Jewish parents, and she may have been born in Russia. In the 2021 revival, Didi became a professional blogger and an artist. Arlene Klasky said that she based the character on herself.
- Grandpa Lou (voiced by David Doyle in 1991–1997; Joe Alaskey in 1997–2008 and Michael McKean in 2021–present) is Tommy, Dil, and Angelica's paternal grandfather and Stu and Drew's father. Called "Pop" by Stu, Drew, Didi, and Charlotte. Grandpa Lou lived with Stu's family for the majority of the series and often babysat the children until he occasionally dozed off. Originally named Stu Pickles, and Sr. in the unaired pilot "Tommy Pickles and The Great White Thing". Lou would often bring up stories of his youth and even brings up historical moments involving his late brother Sparky. In World War II, while training for the army, he crippled his right leg on his mattress and was discharged from the army, only to be drafted into the navy. In the revival series, Grandpa Lou is depicted as a hippie where he is shown with a ponytail, wearing tie-dye shirts, and often doing yoga. It's possible that in his youth that he was a Vietnam veteran. Grandpa Lou also had a weird obsession with the number 15, this could be because he was born in 1915.
- Andrew "Drew" Pickles (voiced by Michael Bell as an adult in 1991–2008, Pamela Adlon as a baby, and Timothy Simons in 2021–present) married to Charlotte, and are Angelica's busy working father and Stu's older brother. A well-paid investment banker (later accountant, then pharmaceutical representative in the revival), Drew does not always get along with his brother, and the two often bicker over petty problems. His catchphrase (when addressing Angelica) is "Princess" and is not afraid to put his foot down whenever Angelica gets into trouble; he's usually the one to punish her like not giving her desserts for a week, amongst other disciplinary actions.
- Charlotte Pickles (voiced by Tress MacNeille in 1991–2008 and Anna Chlumsky in 2021–present) is Angelica's workaholic mother, the CEO of her own company, and married to Drew. She tries to be a good mother but is usually sidetracked by business interests. She is often shown talking on her mobile phone to "Jonathan" (her co-worker), who was shown several times during early episodes of the series. She is also seen to punish her "princess" Angelica if she catches her causing trouble in episodes when Drew isn't present. In the revival series, Charlotte is a city councilwoman.
- Elizabeth "Betty" DeVille (voiced by Kath Soucie in 1991–2008 and Natalie Morales in 2021–present) is Phil and Lil's mother, a former wrestler, and Didi's best friend. Very athletic and feminist. Married to Howard, she helps operate the Java Lava Coffee House with Chas Finster. She is portrayed as a lesbian single mother in the revival series. Betty also owns a coffee house in the revival series, but now as sole proprietor of the renamed Betty's Beans. Morales stated "Anyone who watched the original show may have had an inkling Betty was a member of the LGBT Community".
- Howard "Howie" DeVille (voiced by Phil Proctor in 1991–2008 and Matthew Gray Gubler in 2021-present) is Phil and Lil's mild-mannered father who is unemployed. Howie is often overpowered by, and cringing towards his wife, Betty. Although he is no longer a part of the main cast in the revival, he has made a few appearance as a close friend of Betty's and the birth father of the twins. He is the quietest adult in the group.
- Charles Norbert "Chas" Finster, Sr. (voiced by Michael Bell in 1991–2008 and Tony Hale in 2021–present) is Chuckie's father, from whom he inherited his adenoidal whine. He is a bureaucrat and married Kira in the second Rugrats movie where he became Kimi's stepfather. Chas runs the Java Lava Coffee House with his wife, and Betty in later episodes. Stu is Chas' best friend since childhood. Chas played a minor role in the first Rugrats film and a supporting role in the third. He is a musician in the revival series.
- Kira Watanabe-Finster (voiced by Julia Kato in 2000–2008 and Hiromi Dames in 2022–present) is Kimi's Japanese mother and Chuckie's stepmother. Kira married Chas in Rugrats in Paris: The Movie. On All Grown Up!, she operates the Java Lava Coffee House with her husband and Betty. She somewhat plays the straight woman to the rest of the adults' wackiness, but she enjoys showcasing and trying new things, as opposed to everyone else.
- Dr. Lucille "Lucy" Carmichael (voiced by Cheryl Carter in 1991–1999; understudied by Lisa Dinkins in "Dummi Bear Dinner Disaster"; Hattie Winston in 1999–2008, and The Rugrats Movie; and Nicole Byer in 2021–present) is Susie's mother and Randy's wife. She is a Harvard-educated "wonder mom", and has a job as a doctor, having delivered Dil, and removed Susie's tonsils.
- Randall "Randy" Carmichael (voiced by Ron Glass in 1991–2008 and Omar Benson Miller in 2021–present) is married to Lucy Carmichael and is Susie's father. In the original series, Randy is a screenwriter for the famous cartoon Dummi Bears Show; in the revival series, his occupation is changed to a science teacher.
- Louise "Lulu" Jonston-Pickles (voiced by Debbie Reynolds) is a nurse at the local hospital, with whom Lou fell in love. She eventually marries Lou in Rugrats in Paris, thus becoming Drew and Stu's stepmother and Angelica, Tommy and Dill's step-grandmother.
- Sarah "Taffy" Maynston (voiced by Amanda Bynes) is Lulu's teenage grandniece making her the step-relative of the Pickles family when Lulu got engaged to Lou. She was hired as a regular babysitter for the babies. Taffy is the lead singer of a band, Taffy and the Saltwaters. She always calls the babies "Minis".

== Other recurring ==
=== Babies and children ===
- Alyssa Jasmine Carmichael (voiced by Kath Soucie in "The Last Babysitter" and Bettina Bush in most appearances) is the oldest daughter of the Carmichaels and Susie's older sister.
- Buster Franklin Carmichael (voiced by Kath Soucie in "The Last Babysitter"; Joey Wilcots in "Runaway Reptar" and Crystal Scales in "A Rugrats Kwanzaa") is one of Susie's older brothers. He appeared as a teen in the All Grown Up! episode "In the Family's Way", voiced by Bumper Robinson.
- Edwin Winston Cranstall Louis Xavier Quincy Carmichael, III (voiced by Pat Musick in "Tooth or Dare" and Cree Summer in most appearances) is one of Susie's older brothers. He appeared as a teen in the All Grown Up! episode "In the Family's Way", voiced by Ogie Banks.
- Harold Frumpkin (voiced by Pat Musick) is a child in Angelica and Susie's pre-school class.
- Savannah Violeta Shane (voiced by Shayna Fox) is the most popular girl in school, who Angelica Pickles is jealous of. She often competes with Angelica, feeling she'll never lose, but Savannah never actually wins. Angelica is always saying Savannah invites her to her parties, in the TVIP (Totally Very Important Person), which isn't true. She is also one of the students in Angelica and Susie's preschool class in Rugrats Pre-School Daze.
- Timmy McNulty (voiced by Tara Strong) is the oldest of the five McNulty boys.
- Todd and Ty McNulty (both voiced by Grey DeLisle) are the twins of the McNulty boys. Ty was voiced by E. G. Daily in the McNultys' debut episode "The 'Lympics".
- Terry McNulty (voiced by Grey DeLisle and understudied by E. G. Daily in "Fugitive Tommy") is another one of the McNulty boys.
- Teddy McNulty (voiced by Tara Strong) is the youngest of the McNulty boys.

=== Adults ===
- Mackie and Edie Pickles are the parents of Emmet Pickles and relatives of Stu, Drew, Tommy, and Angelica. When Drew went to change out of his dirty clothes, Angelica thought that they were her new parents.
- Beatrix "Trixie" McGee-Pickles is Tommy, Dill, and Angelica's deceased grandmother, Drew and Stu's mother; and Lou's first wife. Having died before the show's earliest episode, she appears only in Grandpa Lou's flashbacks in the episode "Grandpa's Date". Little is known about her, although at one point, it is mentioned that she worked on Estes Kefauver's campaign for the Democratic Presidential Nomination of 1956.
- Melinda Finster (voiced by Kim Cattrall) is Chuckie's birth mother. She loved flowers, and she died a few months after Chuckie's birth, long before the show began. She is only seen in flashbacks, although she is referenced several times in the series.
- Tia "Great Aunt 'T'" Adegoke (voiced by Irma P. Hall) and Uncle Charles Kojo (voiced by Bill Cobbs) are the great aunt and uncle of Susie and her siblings.
- Boris Kropotkin and Minka Kerpackter (voiced by Michael Bell and Melanie Chartoff in the original series; Henry Winkler and Swoosie Kurtz in the 2021 revival) are Didi's father and mother, and thus Tommy and Dill's maternal grandparents. Both are Jews who emigrated from an unnamed East European nation and retain thick accents and traditions from "The Old Country". Lou and Boris are fierce rivals.
- Benjamin "Ben" Kropotkin (voiced by Jeff Bennett) is Didi's younger brother and Elaine's only husband. In his first appearance, he is about to marry a woman named Elaine, (referring to the characters of the same names in The Graduate) who briefly disappears before the wedding because of cold feet. The married couple appears again to babysit the Rugrats as an experience for having their own children but unpleasantly discovers that raising children may not be so simple.
- Elaine Robinson Kropotkin (voiced by Tress MacNeille in "Let Them Eat Cake" and Meagen Fay in "Baby Maybe") is Ben's wife and Didi's sister-in-law. In her first appearance in "Let Them Eat Cake", she marries Ben. She appears also in "Baby Maybe".
- Miriam "Mim" Pickles (voiced by Andrea Martin) is known as the "money game queen" because she plays poker, and constantly irritates her younger cousin, Grandpa Lou. Her family calls her "Aunt Miriam" even though Stu, Drew, Tommy, and Dil are really her cousins and she always mispronounces Didi's name. It is implied her relationship with Lou as a child mirrors Tommy and Angelica's relationship. She later helps Lou move into a retirement home.
- Shirley Dalmond Finster (voiced by Miraim Margoyles) and Charles Mervyn "Marvin" Finster (voiced by Stacy Keach) are Chas' parents, and Chuckie and Kimi's grandparents.
- Colleen McNulty (voiced by Teresa Ganzel) is the McNulty boys' mother. She appears in "A Very McNulty Birthday" and "Wash Dry Story". Her husband Colin has not been seen.
- Conan McNulty (voiced by Michael Keenan) is the McNulty boys' paternal grandfather and Lou's rival since childhood.
- Larry and Steve (both voiced by Scott Menville) are two teenage boys who always seem to have different odd jobs, such as painters, movie theater attendants, and grocery store employees. They are named after two producers of some episodes. Larry later appeared in the episode "Angelica Orders Out" as a caterer for Zippy's Snappy Home Delivery, but his hair was dyed red, and he was voiced by Jeremy Sisto.
- Jonathan Kraskel (voiced by René Auberjonois in 1995; Dan Castellaneta in 1998–2008 and Antony Del Rio in 2021–present) is Charlotte's meek personal assistant, who she constantly yells at. He was originally portrayed with purple skin, but had fair skin in later appearances.
- Dr. Werner Lipschitz (voiced by Tony Jay) is a child psychologist whom Stu, Didi, and Chas commonly consult for parenting assistance.
- Miss Weemer (voiced by Vicki Lewis) is Angelica and Susie's teacher in pre-school.
- Macie Jonston is Lulu's sister and Taffy's grandmother who became the step-relative of the Pickles family when Lulu married Lou.
- Miranda "Anda" Smellson is Taffy's mother, Macie's daughter, and Lulu's niece.
- Freddie (voiced by Rodger Bumpass) is Betty's older brother and uncle of the twins who only appears in the "Brothers Are Monsters" episode. His behavior and dress sense are similar to his sister's, except he wears his sweater with the Male symbol on the front.

=== Pets ===
- Fifi is a purple poodle, who was originally a Parisian stray which Spike fell in love with in the second Rugrats movie and became his girlfriend.
- Spiffy and Pepper are respectively purple and brown puppies adopted by the Stu Pickles and Chas Finster households. The offspring of a union between Spike and Fifi. In US showings of "Mutts in a Name", the puppy is identified as "Pepper" as a result of a viewer poll.
- Fluffy is Angelica's cat whom Angelica loves dearly, but who always causes trouble for the others, particularly Spike. Some people don't notice it, but she looks just like Angelica.
- Melville is Chuckie's first pet, a pillbug that died in Chuckie's first episode. At that point, Chuckie was training Melville to perform circus tricks.

=== Television ===
- Cynthia is Angelica Pickles' favorite doll. Based on the American doll, Barbie.
- Reptar (voiced by Busta Rhymes in The Rugrats Movie and Fred Tatasciore in 2021–present) is a big green dinosaur reminiscent of Godzilla. Tommy and the other Rugrats love him. Reptar products such as cars, clothes, and candy are frequently seen on the show. Reptar was a main character in Rugrats in Paris and had his own theme park called Euro Reptarland. There was a giant Reptar robot in Euro Reptarland which the babies piloted and fought against Jean Claude. Reptar has had his own ice show, which Lou believes is "sheer brilliance". The babies interrupted it looking for a lizard which they believed was a "Baby Reptar".
- Robosnail is Reptar's archenemy. Robosnail is a mechanical snail with snapping pincers. He made a special guest appearance in Rugrats in Paris, controlled by Jean Claude. Robosnail and Reptar fought throughout Paris, and Robosnail wound up falling into the Seine.
- Dactar is a big Pterodactyl who fights Reptar on TV. He resembles Rodan from Godzilla, which is ironic since they are generally depicted as allies, despite their fighting in Ghidrah, the Three-Headed Monster and Godzilla vs. Mechagodzilla II.
- Thorg (voiced by Phil Proctor) is a giant gorilla and Reptar's enemy. In the episode "Toy Palace", Tommy and Chuckie activate a large robotic Thorg, who chases them through the store, repeating his catchphrase "Thorg hungry! Thorg won't eat!" He is made to resemble King Kong. He'd been sent back in time.
- Captain Blasto (voiced by Adam West) from his early seasons, is a spaceman who hosts his namesake show, a low-budget local children's program reminiscent of the Captain Video series of the 1950s. In "Super Hero Chuckie", Chuckie, Angelica, Stu, and Drew watch the show's production.
- The Dummi Bears are a cartoon watched by the babies, although it seldom interests them and Grandpa Lou, in particular, despises the program. The name is a play on Disney's Gummi Bears, while the show spoofs the Care Bears. Susie's father Randy Carmichael was a writer for the show, and in one episode, the babies are taken to a movie theater to see the Dummi Bears movie.
- Blocky and Oxwinkle (Blocky voiced by June Foray) are Stu and Drew's favorite cartoon characters as babies, a parody of Rocky and Bullwinkle. Blocky talks more than Oxwinkle.
- Yuri and Svetlana (Svetlana voiced by June Foray) are a pair of villains who try to trick and get rid of Blocky and Oxwinkle, calling them "Elk and Weasle". They are a parody of Boris and Natasha, and their nicknames for Blocky and Oxwinkle is a parody of "Moose and Squirrel". In an example of stunt casting, Foray, the original voice of Rocky as well as of Natasha, provided the voice of their Rugrats universe counterparts while Yuri is largely silent.
- Alan Quebec (voiced by Alex Trebek) hosted "Super Stumpers", the fictitious game show on which Didi Pickles appears in the episode "Game Show Didi".
- The Mega Hyper Heroes are the superheroes that the babies watch on TV. The babies imitated the characters by calling themselves the "Mega Diaper Babies". They only appeared in the episode "Mega Diaper Babies" and appear to be based on the Fantastic Four. When four teenagers join their rings together, they become the Mega Hyper Heroes where they work to save Earth and the universe from various villains who would do something like hog the world's oxygen supply, drain the oceans, or blow up the universe.
  - Changeling (voiced by Neil Ross) is the group's leader, capable of adopting animal forms.
  - Miss Invisible (voiced by Kath Soucie) is capable of invisibility.
  - Flaro (voiced by Gregg Berger) is capable of sudden ignition at will.
  - Bolt (voiced by Jim Turner) is capable of morphing into a tall, ultra-strong man.
- Metallitron (voiced by Gregg Berger) is the robotic enemy of the Mega Hyper Heroes.
- The Mole People are Reptar's archenemies.
- Goober the Gopher is a friendly, hug-loving character created by Lipschitz Industries as a friendly children's icon resembling Barney the Dinosaur. In one episode, the grownups got rid of the Reptar decor in the babies' room figuring it scared Dil, and replaced it with Goober the Gopher. This led the babies to get Reptar and Goober to fight for who should be the better mascot.

=== Real people ===
- Chick Hearn (voiced by himself) appeared in the episode "Touchdown Tommy" as the sports anchor of a football game.
- Pat Sajak (voiced by himself) appeared in the episode "Chuckie is Rich" as the host of a Publishers Clearing House-like a contest, where the $10 million grand prize was won by Chas Finster.

== The Rugrats Movie ==
- The Circus Monkeys are a monkey band that escaped during a circus' local train accident. In the end, they are reunited with their owners.
- The Banana Brothers (voiced by Abe Benrubi and Phil Proctor) are ringmasters of the Banana Brothers Monkey Circus and owners of the monkeys.
- Scar Snout is a large wolf eager to eat anyone who trespasses into his territory. He was inspired by a tyrannosaur and the worst predator in the woods. He scares both the babies and the monkeys. In the climax of the film, he tries to stalk the babies, intent on killing them, but is defeated by Spike, the Pickles' dog. The two fall down the bridge where the babies are standing, but only the Wolf is killed by the fall, making him the only character in a Rugrats movie to be killed.
- Ranger Frank (voiced by David Spade and Ranger Margaret (voiced by Whoopi Goldberg) are forest rangers who help the parents find the babies, and the first new characters to see the Reptar Wagon. Ranger Frank is cowardly and excitable, while Ranger Margaret is more calm and rational.
- Rex Pester (voiced by Tim Curry) is a news reporter who hampers the adults' efforts to find the babies as well as Spike. He mispronounced the babies' names as well as mistaking the Reptar Wagon for a horse.

== Rugrats in Paris ==
- Coco LaBouche (voiced by Susan Sarandon) runs the amusement park EuroReptar, a Japanese theme park in Paris. Her boss Mr. Yamaguchi is offering her the job of president of the company, but only if she learns to love children, to which she lies and says that she is engaged. This sets the climax for the film. The real reason she brought the Pickles and gang to France is so that Stu could fix Robo Reptar. She also plans to marry Chas by wooing him for the sake of promotion and kidnap the babies because of her fear of children. When her plans got discovered, her wedding gets called off and Mr. Yamaguchi fires her, much to her humiliation. Angelica steps on her wedding dress, causing it to rip to have her underwear shown in front of everyone, including some people with cameras.
- Jean-Claude (voiced by John Lithgow) is Coco's right-hand assistant. He is loyal to his boss and helps her with the kidnapping of the babies. He usually has the job of telling Kira what to do, and he is more sensible than Coco. Jean-Claude also pilots Robosnail and seems to have fears of dogs as Spike chases him away from the Notre Dame Cathedral.
- Mr. Yamaguchi (voiced by Mako) is the president of Yamaguchi Industries (the main sponsor of the Reptar franchise) and Coco's boss. He made a cameo appearance in The Rugrats Movie, where his face is in a newspaper article holding a toy design contest, which inspired Stu to make the Reptar Wagon. In Rugrats in Paris, Mr. Yamaguchi appeared in person and planned to step down as president and find a successor who cares for children (the main audience for the Reptar franchise). At first, Mr. Yamaguchi is fooled by Coco into believing that she loves children and that she's engaged to Chuckie's father Chas, which prompted him to pass over the promotion to Coco after the wedding. However, Yamaguchi is unaware of the fact that Coco actually despises children (including Chuckie) in general and that she only plans to marry Chas for the sake of promotion. In the end, Angelica and the babies interrupt the wedding and reveal Coco's plot, prompting an angry Yamaguchi to fire Coco immediately.

== Rugrats Go Wild ==
- Eliza Thornberry (voiced by Lacey Chabert)
- Darwin (voiced by Tom Kane)
- Donnie Thornberry (voiced by Flea of the Red Hot Chili Peppers)
- Debbie Thornberry (voiced by Danielle Harris)
- Nigel Thornberry (voiced by Tim Curry)
- Marianne Thornberry (voiced by Jodi Carlisle)
- Siri (voiced by Chrissie Hynde of The Pretenders) is a rare leopard whom the Thornberrys are searching for.

== See also ==
- All Grown Up! § Cast and characters for the cast of the continuation series
