= John Holmquist =

American animator

John Holmquist is an American animator, director, designer, and storyboard artist. He has worked on several episodes of Rugrats as a director and storyboard artist from the late 1990s to early 2000s. In 2003, he won a Daytime Emmy Award for Outstanding Children's Animated Program for his work on Rugrats. Holmquist has also acted as a director for some episodes of Family Guy.

== Career ==
=== For Klasky Csupo, Inc. ===
He has designed the main characters and appeared as a director for many episodes of the animated television series Rugrats from 1991 to 1998 and acts as a storyboard artist for other later episodes from 2001 to 2004 and the three theatrical films.

Here is a partial list of Rugrats episodes he has worked on:

==== As a director ====
- "Radio Daze"
- "Heatwave"
- "Faire Play"
- "The Art Fair"
- "Dust Bunnies"
- "Turtle Recall"
- "Angelica Orders Out"
- "Grandpa's Bad Bug"
- "Johnathan Babysits"
- "The Fugitive"
- "Uneasy Rider"
- "Babysitting Fluffy"
- "No Naps"
- "Chuckie's a Lefty"
- "Zoo Story"
- "Hand Me Downs"
- "The Jungle"
- "Pedal Pusher"
- "Silent Angelica"
- "Runaway Reptar"
- "Cooking with Susie"
- "A Dog's Life"
- "Thumbs Up"
- "Accidents Happen"
- "Bug Off"

==== As a storyboard artist / character designer ====
- "The First Cut"
- "Chuckie Grows"
- "Tommy's First Birthday"
- "Barbeque Story"
- "Waiter There's a Baby in My Soup"
- "At the Movies"
- "Reptar on Ice"
- "Baby Commercial"
- "Little Dude"
- "Lady Luck"
- "Real or Robots"
- "Special Delivery"
- "Ruthless Tommy"
- "Toy Palace"
- "Sand Ho!"
- "Grandpa's Teeth"
- "The Bank Trick"
- "The Santa Experience"
- "Let There Be Light"

In 1994–1999, Holmquist designed characters for Aaahh!!! Real Monsters.

=== Family Guy ===
Holmquist has also directed the following episodes:

- "Running Mates"
- "Airport '07"
- "Stewie Kills Lois"
- "Play it Again, Brian"
- "Ocean's Three and a Half"
- "We Love You, Conrad"
- "Hannah Banana"
- "Extra Large Medium"
- "Excellence in Broadcasting"
- "Leggo My Meg-O"
- "Yug Ylimaf"
- "Call Girl"
- "Finders Keepers"
- "Mom's the Word"
- "Brian the Closer"
- "Our Idiot Brian"
- "Pawtucket Pete"
- "Bri, Robot"
- "Start Me Up"
- "Christmas Is Coming"
- "Yacht Rocky"
- "La Famiglia Guy"
- "Bend or Blockbuster"
