= Family reunion (disambiguation) =

A family reunion takes place on a specified day each year for the purpose of keeping an extended family closer together.

Family Reunion may also refer to:

== Music ==
- Family Reunion (band), a country music band
- Chapter II: Family Reunion, the second album of Mo Thugs
- Family Reunion (album), a 1975 album by The O'Jays, or the title song
- "Family Reunion" (Saliva song), 2008
- "Family Reunion" (Blink-182 song), 1999
- "Family Reunion", a song by Corb Lund from Horse Soldier! Horse Soldier!
- "Family Reunion", a song by David Allan Coe from Longhaired Redneck
- "Family Reunion", a song by George Benson an Songs and Stories

== Other ==
- Family Re-Union, an annual family policy conference in the United States
- Family Reunion (1981 film), an American two-part drama television film starring Bette Davis
- Family Reunion (1988 film), a Canadian romantic comedy television film
- The Family Reunion (painting), an 1867 painting by Frédéric Bazille
- Family Reunion (TV series), a 2019 American television series released on Netflix
- Family Reunion, a 2022 Taiwanese television series released on SET Taiwan
- "Family Reunion" (Rugrats), an episode of the Nicktoons show Rugrats
- The Family Reunion, a 1939 play by T. S. Eliot
- Family reunification, immigration reason

== See also ==
- Family (disambiguation)
- Reunion (disambiguation)
