= Reunion Day =

Reunion Day can refer to:

- Act Zluky - a public holiday in Ukraine sometimes translated as "Reunion Day"
- Reunion Day (Denmark) - a public holiday in Denmark
- Reunion Day (film) - a 1962 British TV movie
- Class reunion - a meeting of former classmates

== See also ==
- Reunification Day - a public holiday in Vietnam
- German Unity Day - a public holiday in Germany marking reunification
- Réunion Island day gecko (Phelsuma borbonica) - a species of day gecko native to northern Réunion that is sometimes called the Réunion day gecko
- Reunion (disambiguation)
