= Little Dude =

Little Dude may refer to:

- "Little Dude" an episode of Adventure Time season 5
- "Little Dude" an episode of Rugrats
