= Reunion =

Reunion commonly refers to:

- Class reunion
- Family reunion

Reunion, Réunion, Re-union, Reunions or The Reunion may also refer to:

== Places ==
=== Populated places ===
- Réunion, a French overseas department and island in the Indian Ocean
- Reunion, Commerce City, Colorado, US
- Reunion, Florida, a resort neighborhood near Orlando, Florida, US
- Holy Empire of Reunion, a Brazilian micronation that claims the French island as its territory
- Reunion District, Dallas, US

=== Buildings ===
- Reunion Arena, an indoor arena in Dallas, Texas, US
- Reunion Tower, a building in Dallas, Texas, US

== Arts and entertainment ==
=== Literature ===
- Reunion (Uhlman novel), a 1971 German-language novel by Fred Uhlman
- Reunion (Foster novel), a 2001 science fiction novel by Alan Dean Foster
- Reunion (Cabot novel), a 2005 young-adult novel by Meg Cabot
- "Reunion" (short story), a 1962 short story by John Cheever
- Reunion (play), a play by David Mamet
- Reunion (Buffy comic), a 2002 comic book
- "Reunion", a storyline in the science fiction comedy webtoon series Live with Yourself!
- The Reunion (Animorphs), a book in the Animorphs science fiction series
- Force Heretic: Reunion, a novel by Sean Williams and Shane Dix
- Knights of the Old Republic: Reunion, a story arc in the Knights of the Old Republic series of comic books

=== Film ===
- Reunion (1932 film), a British drama
- Reunion (1936 film), a film by Norman Taurog
- Reunion (1980 film), a television film by Russ Mayberry
- Reunion (1989 film), a film based on the novella by Fred Uhlman
- Reunion, a 1977 film by Michael Talbott
- Reunion, a 1985 television film by Lee Grant
- Reunion, a 1986 Taiwanese film starring Terry Hu
- Reunion (2001 film) or American Reunion, a film by Leif Tilden and Mark Poppi
- Reunion, a 2009 film starring Derek Cecil
- Reunion (2012 film), a Japanese film by Ryoichi Kimizuka
- Reunion (2015 film), a Finnish film
- Reunion (2018 film), an Indian Bengali-language film
- Reunion (2020 film), a New Zealand horror film
- Reunion (2024 film), an American comedy
- The Reunion (1963 film), an Italian comedy
- The Reunion (2011 American film), an action film by Michael Pavone
- The Reunion (2011 Danish film), a comedy by Niels Nørløv
- The Reunion (2012 film), a Filipino comedy-drama romance film
- The Reunion (2013 film), a Swedish film

=== Games ===
- Réunion (card game), a 19th-century German card game similar to skat
- Reunion (video game), a space strategy game developed by Amnesty Design in 1994
- X3: Reunion, a computer game produced by Egosoft and released in 2005

=== Music ===
==== Albums ====
- Mel Tormé and the Marty Paich Dektette – Reunion (1988)
- Reunion: The Songs of Jimmy Webb, 1974 album by Glen Campbell
- Reunion (Black Sabbath album) (1998)
- Reunion (Art Ensemble of Chicago album) (2003)
- Reunion (Dune album), an unreleased album
- Reunion (Gary Burton album) (1989)
- Reunion (Odyssey the Band album), (1998)
- Reunion (The Rankin Family album) (2007)
- Reunion (Temptations album) (1982)
- Reunion (Country Joe and the Fish album) (1977)
- Reunion, a 2011 album by Viggo Mortensen
- The Reunion (Capone-N-Noreaga album) (2000)
- The Reunion (Rare Essence album) (2015)
- The Reunion (George Shearing and Stéphane Grappelli album)
- Reunion (Junk Yard Band album) (1996)
- Doomed for Live – Reunion 2002, a live album by Candlemass
- Reunion: A Decade of Solas, the 2006 reunion album by Solas
- Reunion, a 1978 reunion album by Peter, Paul and Mary
- Reunion, an album by Gary Benson (musician)
- The Reunion, a 1972 Chinese-American opera album by Lisa Lu and company
- Re:Union, an album by Lego Big Morl
- Reunions (album), by Jason Isbell (2020)

==== Songs ====
- "Reunion" (Korea Girl song) (1997)
- "Reunion" (M83 song) (2012)
- "Reunion" (ClariS song) (2013)
- "Reunion", a 2012 song by the xx from coexist
- "The Reunion", a 2011 song by Bad Meets Evil from Hell: The Sequel
- "Reunion", a 2005 song by Les Incompétents
- "Reunion", a 1995 song by Collective Soul from Collective Soul
- "Reunion", a 1986 song by Erasure from Wonderland
- "The Reunion", a 1980 song by The Blades
- "Reunion", a 1976 song by Bobby Goldsboro
- "A Reunion", a 1973 song by Gentle Giant from In a Glass House
- "Reunions", a 1971 song by Carly Simon from her eponymous album

==== Other uses in music ====
- Reunion (band), an ad-hoc group of studio musicians which had a hit with "Life Is a Rock (But the Radio Rolled Me)"
- Re-union (duo), a Dutch musical duo known for representing the Netherlands in the Eurovision Song Contest 2004
- Reunion Records, a Contemporary Christian music label

=== Radio ===
- The Reunion (radio series), a BBC Radio 4 current affairs programme

=== Television ===
==== Episodes ====
- "Re: Union" (Farscape episode), a 2000 season 3 number 8 episode 30 of Farscape
- "Reunion" (30 Rock)
- "Reunion" (Agents of S.H.I.E.L.D.: Slingshot)
- "Reunion" (Amphibia)
- "Reunion" (Angel)
- "Reunion" (Big Love)
- "Reunion" (Daredevil)
- "Reunion" (Gotham)
- "Reunion" (Harsh Realm)
- "Reunion" (Haven)
- "Reunion" (Law & Order: Criminal Intent)
- "Reunion" (Runaways)
- "Reunion" (Star Trek: The Next Generation)
- "Reunion" (Star Wars: The Bad Batch)
- "Reunion" (Stargate Atlantis)
- "The Reunion" (Baywatch)
- "The Reunion" (Curb Your Enthusiasm)
- "Reunion", an episode of The Legend of Korra
- "Reunion: The Remaining Time", an episode of Naruto anime series

==== Series ====
- Reunion (American TV series), a 2005 American drama series
- Reunion (British TV series), a 2025 British television series
- The Reunion (TV series), a Singaporean series
- Dynasty: The Reunion, a 1991 miniseries
- Reunion with James Brolin, a 1990 reality series
- Reunions (Philippine TV series), 2005

==== Other uses in television ====
- "Reunion" (advertisement), a 2013 YouTube/television advertisement by Google India for Google Search
- The Dukes of Hazzard: Reunion!, a 1997 made-for-television film
- Reunion (Playhouse 90), an American television play

=== Sculpture ===
- Reunion (Gummer), a 1992 public sculpture by Don Gummer
- Reconciliation (Josefina de Vasconcellos sculpture) or Reunion

== Other uses ==
- Reunion (genealogy software)
- Reunion.com or MyLife

== See also ==
- Class Reunion (disambiguation)
- Family reunion (disambiguation)
- La Reunion (disambiguation)
- Adoption reunion registry
- Union (disambiguation)
- Re (disambiguation)
