= La Reunion =

La Reunion (English: The Meeting): La Réunion (French) or La Reunión (Spanish), may refer to:

- La Réunion, an island in the Indian Ocean east of Madagascar, that is an overseas department of France
- La Réunion (Dallas), a communal settlement near present-day Dallas, Texas
- La Réunion, Lot-et-Garonne, a town in the Lot-et-Garonne department of France
- La Reunión, a village in Huiramba (municipality), Mexico
- La Reunión (album), a 2007 album by reggaeton duo Yaga & Mackie
- La Reunion, an imprint of the American publisher Deep Vellum

== See also ==
- Reunion (disambiguation)
