= Reptar on Ice =

- Rugrats segment
- Title card
- Episode no.: Season 2 Episode 10a
- Directed by: Howard E. Baker
- Written by: Peter Gaffney
- Production code: 023A
- Original air date: November 15, 1992

Guest appearance
- John Schuck as Reptar

Episode chronology
← Previous "Beach Blanket Babies"	Next → "Family Feud"

"Reptar on Ice" is the first segment of the 10th episode of the second season of the animated television series Rugrats and the first segment of the 23rd episode overall. The episode was written by Peter Gaffney and directed by Howard E. Baker. The episode originally aired on the television network Nickelodeon on November 15, 1992. "Reptar on Ice" followed the infant main characters, Tommy, Chuckie, Phil and Lil going to an ice show with their parents that follows the love story of the babies' favorite monster, Reptar. There, the babies attempt to return a lizard to the actor, assuming it is his child.

"Reptar on Ice" continued Rugrats' employment of the character Reptar, a satirical parody of Godzilla. The episode included several other cultural references; the basic theme lampoons the commercialization of children's media products and its plethora of merchandise tie-ins. The ice show the children see is referent to real-life ice shows, such as "Disney on Ice," and its plot centers on a Beauty and the Beast-style love story.

The episode was released on the DVD and VHS compilation "Decade in Diapers," which included the "favorite episodes" of Rugrats in their respected category as voted on by fans on Nick.com, and was celebratory of the show's tenth anniversary. "Reptar on Ice" in particular was categorized as the "Favorite Reptar-Rageous Episode." Gord Lacey of TVShowsOnDVD described it as one of his favorite episodes from the compilation, tied with "Vacation Special." It was adapted into an audio story, which was featured prominently on the CD and cassette tape "In Search of the Mighty Reptar".

== Plot ==
Half-length promotional version of the episode.

The babies discover a tiny lizard in Tommy Pickles' backyard that they are convinced is the offspring of Reptar, a fictitious green dinosaur and main character of many action movies of which the Rugrats are fond. After learning about the extinction of the dinosaurs, Tommy decides to return the lizard to Reptar just as his family has purchased tickets for a musical ice show based on the character. After Tommy's parents and grandfather have fallen asleep, the babies sneak into the ice rink and present the lizard to Leo, the actor portraying Reptar, who coincidentally happens to possess a phobia of lizards. Stu Pickles, Tommy's father, sees the Rugrats and must retrieve them from the ice rink.

== Production ==
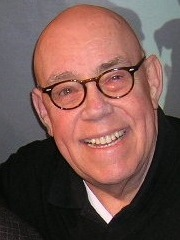
John Schuck guest starred in the episode.

"Reptar on Ice" was written by Peter Gaffney and directed by Howard E. Baker. It is the first segment of the tenth episode of season two of Rugrats, which was created by Arlene Klasky and Gabor Csupo, along with Paul Germain, founders of the self-titled company Klasky-Csupo. "Reptar on Ice" was originally broadcast on Nickelodeon on November 15, 1992. John Schuck guest starred as Reptar. In the episode, Reptar is played by a man named Leo, who was used during season one's "Reptar's Revenge" dressed as Reptar for a state fair.

== Themes ==
Reptar had been used since season 1, episode 3a, "At the Movies," as a satirical parody of the fictional Japanese monster, Godzilla. Despite being a green dinosaur, he still embodies the character, and though he is portrayed comically, his name is referent to the way a child would pronounce "Velociraptor," later made famous for its appearance in Jurassic Park. Reptar is used to demonstrate and subsequently lampoon the ever-growing domination of Japanese culture into children's society.

"Reptar on Ice" continues this satirical tradition, heavily displaying the over commercialization where media is dragged on into several merchandising tie-ins. Angelica is insistent on only eating Reptar brand cereal, which Stu states has "no actual food in it." The ice show the babies attend mocks several different real life ice shows, including "Disney on Ice" and "Barney on Ice." Another reference in the episode is the subsequent joke about Beauty and the Beast in the romantic plot of the entire "Reptar on Ice" performance.

== Reception and home media ==
"Reptar on Ice" was originally broadcast on the television network Nickelodeon on November 15, 1992. The 1997 VHS tape "Return of Reptar" was the first home video release with this episode. Four years later in 2001, the episode is featured on a VHS and DVD compilation for the show's tenth anniversary entitled Decade in Diapers. It included ten episodes that were voted by fans on Nick.com as their favorites in specific categories - "Reptar on Ice" was listed as the favorite "Reptar-Rageous Episode." The Decades in Diapers video had originally been released as a VHS in 2001, and though Paramount Studios intended to concurrently put it as a DVD as well, they "opted to wait a year". On June 2, 2009, "Reptar on Ice" was released on the Rugrats: The Best of Season 2 DVD by Amazon.com. On May 9, 2014, "Reptar on Ice" was released on the Rugrats: Season 2 DVD by Amazon.com. On May 2, 2017, "Reptar on Ice" was released on the Rugrats: Season 2 DVD by Paramount Home Media Distribution.

Gord Lacey of TVShowsOnDVD named the episode one of his favorites on the compilation, tying with the episode "Vacation Special," which followed the families going to Las Vegas to relax. "Reptar on Ice" was adapted onto a CD entitled In Search of the Mighty Reptar. It features a story-time set of two "adventures" the babies have; the second story features another Reptar story, entitled "Journey to the Center of the Basement," where they venture to their basement in order to "rescue" their "Reptar, Jr." toy. The CD was as well made for cassette tapes, both being released on July 20, 1999. In Search of the Mighty Reptar was a part of Nickelodeon's "Rugrats Go Reptar!" event that published several different other merchandise types for Rugrats, including direct-to-video releases and magazines.

== See also ==
- List of Rugrats episodes
- Figure skating
