= Class Reunion (disambiguation) =

A class reunion is a meeting of former classmates, typically organized at or near their former school by one of the class on or around a milestone anniversary of their graduation.

Class Reunion may also refer to:

- Class Reunion (novel), a 1928 novel by Franz Werfel
- Class Reunion (TV series), an Irish television show
- "Class Reunion (That Used to Be Us)", a 2005 single by Lonestar
- Class Reunion, a 1979 novel by Rona Jaffe
- National Lampoon's Class Reunion or Class Reunion, a 1982 black comedy film written by John Hughes and directed by Michael Miller

== Ses also ==
- High School Reunion (disambiguation)
- School Reunion (Doctor Who), a 2006 TV episode
