= Family Reunion (band) =

Country music band

Family Reunion is the world's first "virtual" country music band. It is composed of six anonymous American musicians and composers living in Virginia, Tennessee, Texas, and California. A majority of the songs were composed by Brian Rock (BMI) and Chris Spradling (BMI) who first worked together in Roanoke, Virginia. The duo also had submissions with American Idol.

== Background ==
In 2010, Family Reunion released the single Blue Collar King. The members live in different parts of the US.

Family Reunion is a country band formed by six professional musicians and songwriters with collective experience in session work, film sound production, and touring. The members established the group following a meeting at a family event.

In 2010, Family Reunion were awarded platinum and gold “Auddys” from the music review site Uplaya.com. In 2011, their singles “A Hard Man (Is Good To Find)” and “Yes” reached the top 40 charts of the European ECMA. In 2012, their debut CD, Family Album, was released. The album received a short review in The Dallas Morning News (rated "B"). Later that year, Family Reunion was nominated for 3 ICoMA Awards (Song of the Year, Album of the Year and Best Country Band.) In June 2012, they were presented with the award for the Independent Country Music Association (ICoMA) Album of the Year.

== Discography ==
=== Singles ===
- Blue Collar King (2010)
- A Hard Man (Is Good to Find) (2010)
- Yes (2011)

=== Albums ===
- Family Album (2011)

Tracks:

- Blue Collar King
- A Hard Man (Is Good to Find)
- Judy My Dear
- Beautiful Judas
- Yes
- Hey Broken Hearted
- Dulcita
- Delores
- Peas Porridge Cold

== Awards ==
- 2012 ICMA Country Album of the Year

== Nominations ==
- 2012 ICMA Song of the Year: Yes
- 2012 ICMA Country Album of the Year: Family Album
- 2012 ICMA Best Country Band: Family Reunion

== Other accolades ==
- Platinum Auddy issued by music analysis site UPlaya for Blue Collar King
- God Auddy issued by music analysis site UPlaya for A Hard Man (Is Good to Find)
- ECMA top 30 song “A Hard Man (Is Good To Find)” in Italy and Norway (January 28th, 2011)
- ECMA top 40 song “Yes” in Italy (April 22, 2011)
