= Reunion with James Brolin =

Reunion was a syndicated American reality television series that ran from 1990 to 1991.

In the series, people were reunited in various situations, from long-lost friends and loves to missing children and parents. Also featured were humorous reunions between celebrities, sports figures and other personalities. The shows forte was reuniting people who were adopted with their biological parents.

The show was hosted by Michael Gold, Alanna Davis and James Brolin.
