= At the Movies (Rugrats) =

- Rugrats episode
- Episode no.: Season 1 Episode 3a
- Directed by: Dan Thompson
- Written by: Craig Bartlett; Paul Germain
- Production code: 003A
- Original air date: August 25, 1991

Episode chronology
← Previous "Waiter, There's a Baby in My Soup"	Next → "Slumber Party"

"At the Movies" is the first segment of the third episode of the animated television series Rugrats. It originally aired on the television network Nickelodeon on August 25, 1991, during the series' first season. In the episode, The Rugrats go to a movie theatre to see The Dummi Bears and the Land Without Smiles, but Tommy is infatuated with seeing a monster movie, Reptar!. He and the babies sneak out of the theater room to catch a showing of Reptar! while leaving a wake of accidental mayhem and destruction as they do.

"At the Movies" was written by Craig Bartlett and series co-creator Paul Germain and directed by Dan Thompson. The episode introduced the characters of the Dummi Bears and Reptar. The Dummi Bears were inspired by non-violent children's characters such as the Care Bears and Disney's Adventures of the Gummi Bears, whereas Reptar was heavily inspired by the Japanese monster Godzilla and satirized the ever-growing domination of Japanese culture in children's society. The character appeared in countless media tie-ins for the series, including a cereal brand, t-shirts, and video games, and would be reused in several other episodes of the series throughout its run.

Author Jan Susina gave a generally positive review of "At the Movies" in the book, The Japanification of Children's Popular Culture: From Godzilla to Miyazaki. In 1997, it became available on the VHS Rugrats: Return of Reptar, which was nominated for the Video Software Dealers Association's Home Entertainment Award in the "Outstanding Marketing Campaign for a Major Direct-to-Video Release" category in 2000.

== Plot ==
Tommy wants to see Reptar, but his parents take him to see The Dummi Bears and the Land Without Smiles at Westside Octoplex. They decide it would be perfect as Tommy's first movie and also invite their friends so they can all see the movie together.

At the movie theater, Tommy tells his friends about Reptar. This causes them to want to see the movie about Reptar instead. As the film starts, they walk out of the Dummi Bears movie (which Grandpa Lou derisively refers to as The Land Without Brains) and try to find Reptar.

While searching, they walk into a theater featuring a romantic film. As they watch a couple kissing on the big screen, their silhouettes block some of the screen as a man shouts at them, "Hey! Down in front!" An usher comes in as the Rugrats hide around the seats to avoid being caught, inadvertently interrupting a couple having a date in the process. They leave with Lil stating that she doesn't like kissing movies because "Nothing ever happens."

They then wander to the concessions stand. There the babies find popcorn, orange and grape sodas, lids, napkins, cups, candy bars, ketchup, mustard, and straws (the two teenage employees in charge, Larry and Steve, don't notice the babies because they're arguing over comic books). Tommy checks the popcorn booth for Reptar, while Phil and Lil take interest in the soda dispensers, pushing the buttons and spilling the soft drinks on the counters and floors until eventually they get stuck continuously pouring soda. Meanwhile, Chuckie, after sampling some candy, notices some stairs leading up while Phil and Lil start playing with the ketchup and mustard dispensers by the hot dog sections. Phil & Lil play with straws and spill all the straws. After Chuckie points out the stairs, Tommy concludes they'll find Reptar upstairs. As soon as the babies leave, the two teenagers notice the massive mess and scream.

They climb up into the projection booths, perceiving the film projectors as "spaghetti merry-go-rounds". They check each movie until they find the right one and are awed by the movie. Lou goes to the concession stand to get some snacks. As Phil tries to get a look because the others are crowding the window, Phil falls onto one of the film projectors and starts riding it around. Soon the rest of the babies start riding them. Then they grab the films and run around with them, tangling them up together as the films begin to unravel and break.

Seeing the damage they've done, the babies quickly rush back downstairs as the projectionist notices the incredible mess and tries to save the film unsuccessfully. Grandpa Lou finds them after getting some snacks from the concession stand (he comments on the mess the babies caused, telling Larry and Steve how in his time they knew how to keep a workplace clean). Grandpa Lou takes them back with him to the Dummi Bears movie, which catches in the projector and melts The Land Without Smiles at the climax, leaving most of the audience groaning and yelling. The babies smile at each other at this, while Grandpa Lou eats some popcorn.

The Westside Octoplex theater was closed due to disasters as the patrons leave for not receiving a refund, the pictures going black when they were getting to important scenes, and complaining about the taste of the popcorn (due to the mess the babies have made in the concession stand and destroyed the film projectors), and Stu is angry at the fact that The Land Without Smiles went out at the climax. Didi tells him that they will have to wait until The Land Without Smiles comes out on video. But at least they think that Tommy can go through a whole movie without any fuss. Because they didn't see the ending, Didi and Stu decide to go out to see the movie again next week, but at a different theater. As Grandpa Lou eats a candy bar in the back seat, Tommy takes notice of a flashing Reptar billboard as they drive by.

== Production ==
"At the Movies" was written by Craig Bartlett and Paul Germain—creator of Rugrats along with Arlene Klasky and Gábor Csupó—and directed by Dan Thompson. Germain additionally served as animation director, a role he played for all early episodes of the series. Recording sessions for the episode, located in Hollywood, California, for each actor individually took one day to complete, taking anywhere from fifteen minutes to four hours depending on the scene or role.

The episode marked the first appearance of the character Reptar. Reptar was modeled visually to resemble a Tyrannosaurus rex, but his mannerisms and actions were meant to parody that of the fictional monster, Godzilla, who first appeared in the 1954 film Godzilla, released in Japan as Gojira. Though he is portrayed comically, his name was based on a child's mispronunciation of Velociraptor, a ferocious dinosaur made iconic for its appearance in the Steven Spielberg film Jurassic Park. As noted by W. J. T. Mitchell in his book The Last Dinosaur Book, children generally begin fascination with dinosaurs between ages four and seven, while at other times during preschool and elementary school. This demographic was the general age of Rugrats' viewers and likely the reason behind Reptar's species.

"At the Movies" became available on the VHS release entitled Rugrats: Return of Reptar in 1997. The release included several other Reptar-themed episodes, including "Reptar 2010" and "Reptar on Ice". It was released both as part of a special promotional deal between Paramount Home Entertainment and Oral-B and as a re-promotion of Rugrats videos during the holiday season. On June 2, 2009, "At the Movies" was released on the Rugrats: Season 1 DVD by Amazon.com. On May 2, 2017, "At the Movies" was released on the Rugrats: Season 1 DVD by Paramount Home Media Distribution.

== Cultural impact and references ==
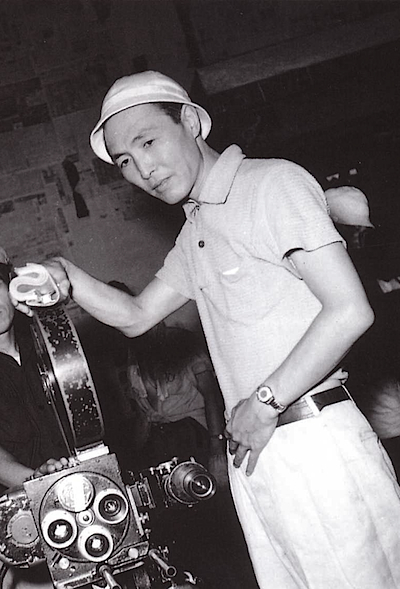
Reptar! is a parody of Ishirō Honda's (pictured) 1954 film Godzilla.

"At the Movies" introduced characters such as Reptar and the Dummi Bears—each of whom would become recurring characters throughout the series—and marked the first time in the series that the Rugrats had seen a movie. Reptar, in particular, would appear in several episodes throughout the series in different manifestations. During different episodes, he has appeared as a toyline, a focal point in a marketing campaign, cereal brands, and a character in a television series. In The Rugrats Movie, released in 1998, Reptar appears as a mechanical wagon built by Stu, voiced by rapper Busta Rhymes. In its sequel, Rugrats in Paris: The Movie, released in 2000, the central setting is located at a vast Reptar theme park in France called "EuroReptarland", similar to Disneyland Paris, which features a stage production with a robotic Reptar created by Stu.

Reptar himself became an actual merchandising piece and became the basis of several Rugrats promotional works. Several videos, books, toylines, and clothing have been marketed by Nickelodeon, serving as both a high-profit margin and a parody of the character's fictional success in the series. Bed sheets, lamps, and a cereal brand have all become available in stores and feature Reptar. A Rugrats video game entitled Rugrats: Search for Reptar followed Tommy looking for missing pieces of a Reptar puzzle. The game was widely successful and became a part of PlayStation's "Greatest Hits" label in 1999.

The Dummi Bears are parodies of the Care Bears franchise, and the film they are featured in, The Land Without Smiles, is a parody of the feature-length 1985 film The Care Bears Movie based on the franchise, while the title of the film is a reference to the Care Bears' first TV special from 1983, The Care Bears in the Land Without Feelings. The Dummi Bears' name is a reference to the TV series Disney's Adventures of the Gummi Bears. One scene in The Land Without Smiles details the Dummi Bears firing valentines from the clouds for all the sad, bullied, lonely, and teased children in the world references a similar scene from The Care Bears Movie.

== Reception ==
"At the Movies" was originally broadcast on the television network Nickelodeon on August 25, 1991. It was paired with the episode "Slumber Party". In 2000, Rugrats: Return of Reptar, in which the episode was featured, was nominated for the Video Software Dealers Association's Home Entertainment Award for "Outstanding Marketing Campaign for a Major Direct-to-Video Release. In 2001, Nickelodeon allowed viewers to vote for their favorite Rugrats episode on Nick.com as part of the series' 10th anniversary. When the poll results were announced, "At the Movies" ranked at number 39.

The episode received a generally positive response. In the book The Japanification of Children's Popular Culture: From Godzilla to Miyazaki, Jan Susina opined that it was "appropriate" to introduce Reptar in the episode via a television commercial, as "Throughout the series, Reptar's power and popularity increases, so that by Rugrats in Paris a Euro-Reptarland exists." Susina also noted that his existence in the series was "one of the more unexpected" treatments of Japanese culture in "contemporary American children's culture".
