= High School Reunion =

High School Reunion may refer to:

- "High School Reunion" (Yes, Dear episode)
- Romy and Michele's High School Reunion
- High School Reunion (TV series)
- Class reunion
