= TVShowsOnDVD.com =

Website dedicated to discussing DVD releases

- Website type: News
- Owner: CBS Interactive
- Launched: November 1, 2001; 24 years ago
- Current status: Defunct as of 25 May 2018

TVShowsOnDVD.com was a website dedicated to cataloging, campaigning for, and reporting news about Region 1 television series releases on DVD and region A Blu-ray. The site's slogan asked: "Is YOUR Favorite Show On DVD?".

From February 2007 until its closing, the site was affiliated with TV Guide. In March 2013, TVGuide.com was acquired by CBS Interactive, transferring control of TVShowsOnDVD.com to the new owners.

On May 25, 2018, the website was shut down, and news updates were moved to social media. The team is currently trying to publish their articles in a pay-per-view subscription-based service via Substack, much to dismay of the original audience.

== Description ==
The site began on November 1, 2001, and was expanded to accept votes from registered members for over 10,000 television shows throughout TV history. The site contained information on over 8,000 TV-DVD releases—including full season, best of, and individual episode releases. The site also posted thousands of news articles relating to upcoming releases, reviews of TV-DVDs that were currently on the market, and sometimes a list of alterations (such as use of syndicated episode versions and music replacement) to various TV-DVDs.

Users could create accounts to vote for which TV shows they would like to have seen on DVD and compile lists of the sets they owned and wanted. In early November 2005, the site received over 75,000 visitors a day and had official links with many major studios. The site also maintained an RSS feed, a blog, a presence on Twitter and a Facebook fan page. At their Facebook fan page they also maintain a "What's The Hold-up? FAQ", describing known reasons why particular shows are not currently receiving DVD releases.

== Home Theater Forum ==
The site was very closely linked to Home Theater Forum. The founder of TVShowsOnDVD.com, Gord Lacey, and the site's news director, David Lambert, were both regularly posting members at the "HTF" and were registered there prior to the creation of the site they worked at. The HTF's "TV on DVD and Blu-ray: Shows and TV Movies" section remained the official message board of TVShowsOnDVD.com.

On February 15, 2007, Gord Lacey announced that the site had been acquired by TV Guide.
