= List of Rugrats episodes =

Rugrats is an American animated television series created by Arlene Klasky, Gábor Csupó and Paul Germain and produced by the former two's company, Klasky Csupo, for Nickelodeon. The series focuses on a group of toddlers, most prominently Tommy Pickles, Chuckie Finster and twins Phil and Lil DeVille, whose day-to-day experiences become much greater adventures in their imaginations.

The series premiered on August 11, 1991, as one of Nickelodeon's original three animated series known as "Nicktoons". It initially ran for 65 episodes before production was halted, but its popularity through reruns led to the production of new episodes beginning in 1996. Rugrats ultimately ran for 172 episodes across nine seasons, with its final episode airing on August 1, 2004. Its popularity also led to three theatrical films and the sequel series All Grown Up!.

Rugrats became one of Nickelodeon's longest-running animated series and was the network's top-rated series from 1995 to 2001. It received more than 20 awards, including four Daytime Emmy Awards and six Kids' Choice Awards, as well as a star on the Hollywood Walk of Fame. A reboot of the series, executive-produced by the original creative team of Klasky, Csupó and Germain, premiered on Paramount+ in 2021.

The series as well as the three feature films have all been released in their entirety on DVD and digital purchase.

== Series overview ==
Season	Segments	Episodes	Originally released	
Season	Segments	Episodes	First released	Last released
Pilot			August 7, 2001 (VHS/DVD)	
1	25	13	August 11, 1991	December 22, 1991
2	51	26	September 13, 1992	May 23, 1993
3	51	26	September 26, 1993	April 13, 1995
4	28	15	December 4, 1996	November 22, 1997
5	25	14	May 29, 1998	November 10, 1998
6	64	36	January 18, 1999	July 20, 2001
7	37	15	January 15, 2001	December 11, 2001
8	22	13	February 9, 2002	April 10, 2004
9	24	14	September 21, 2002	August 1, 2004
Tales from the Crib	—N/a	2	November 13, 2005	November 5, 2006

== Episodes ==
=== Pilot (1990) ===
Title	Directed by	Written by	Original release date
"Tommy Pickles and the Great White Thing"	Peter Chung	Ben Herndon & Paul Germain	August 7, 2001 (VHS) September 24, 2002 (DVD) (Note: The pilot episode never aired on television, but was later released on the Decade in Diapers VHS and DVD.)
After seeing his grandpa go to the bathroom so many times, Tommy Pickles wants to find out what a "great white thing" (toilet) is, creating a mess when he investigates. Note: Although the episode was released in 2001, it was produced in 1990.

=== Season 1 (1991) ===
No. overall	No. in season	Title (Note: Alternate titles for episodes from the first three seasons are sourced from archived Nickelodeon and YTV episode guides.)	Directed by	Written by	Original release date	Prod. code
1	1	"Tommy's First Birthday"	Howard E. Baker	Paul Germain & Craig Bartlett	August 11, 1991	001
Stu and Didi strive to make Tommy's first birthday a memorable one. They do, but under the wrong circumstances. Meanwhile, Tommy wants to eat dog food so he can be just like Spike, eventually selling the other Rugrats on the idea.
2	2	"Barbecue Story" (Note: Originally called "Bar-B–Q Story") "BAR-B-Q"	Norton Virgien	Steve Viksten & Joe Ansolabehere	August 18, 1991	002
2	2	"Waiter, There's a Baby in My Soup" "Baby in My Soup"	Norton Virgien	Craig Bartlett & Paul Germain	August 18, 1991	002
Tommy has received his most favorite toy in the whole wide world – a ball. Angelica, who is always looking to spoil the babies' fun, takes the ball and throws it into the next yard, resulting in the babies risking life and limb to look for it. Stu and Didi end up taking Tommy to an important dinner at Chez Ennui with Mr. Mucklehoney (president of Mucklehoney Industries, a toy company), since Tiffany the babysitter (via telephone) and Grandpa have other plans (the babysitter's OTHER goldfish died and Grandpa was going bowling with a friend of his, Louise). Tommy, however, has plans of his own.
3	3	"At the Movies"	Dan Thompson	Craig Bartlett & Paul Germain	August 25, 1991	003
3	3	"Slumber Party"	Dan Thompson	Jeffrey Townsend	August 25, 1991	003
Tommy wants to see Reptar, but his parents take him and the other Rugrats, to the Westside Octoplex to see The Land Without Smiles, starring the Dummi Bears, instead. The Rugrats leave the Dummi Bears to go look for Reptar (showing at the same theater), leaving a path of destruction behind them. Angelica stays over with Tommy, but her desire for an open window leaves Tommy feeling ill and hallucinating, which eventually leads to his vomiting on her.
4	4	"Baby Commercial" (Note: Originally called "Baby Commercial—Take 1")	Howard E. Baker	Steve Viksten & Joe Ansolabehere	September 8, 1991	004
4	4	"Little Dude"	Howard E. Baker	M.S. Freeman	September 8, 1991	004
Phil and Lil make a brief appearance in a diaper commercial, and they tell Tommy about it, as well as the mayhem they cause in the process. Didi takes Tommy to her workplace, a local high school, for use as a visual aid in Home Economics. Three of her students ask to watch Tommy while Didi's on her lunch break, but when they accidentally lose him, he starts wandering around the campus, causing trouble as he does.
5	5	"Beauty Contest" (Note: Originally called "Little Miss Lovely")	Norton Virgien	Story by : Arlene Klasky; Teleplay by : Everett Peck	September 15, 1991	005
5	5	"Baseball" (Note: Originally called "Tommy at Bat")	Norton Virgien	M.S. Freeman	September 15, 1991	005
Having the desire for the Kingfisher 9000 (a top-of-the-line sports boat), Stu and Grandpa enter Tommy into a beauty contest by placing him in girl's clothes and a wig, naming him "Tonya". Their main competitor is Angelica, who complicates the competition. Using tickets Grandpa won in a radio contest, Stu and Grandpa take Tommy to the Grizzlies' baseball game, where they play the Boston Bombers. Tommy, however, is more interested in catching his balloon than the ball game. As the episode progresses, Tommy's balloon hunt eventually helps make a spectacular catch for Grizzlies player Bucky Majors.
6	6	"Ruthless Tommy"	Dan Thompson	Ron Birnbach	September 22, 1991	006
6	6	"Moose Country"	Dan Thompson	Jeffrey Townsend	September 22, 1991	006
Being mistaken for the son of millionaire Ronald Thump, Tommy is kidnapped by some thugs, Bob and Mike. The thieves soon find that kidnapping Tommy is more trouble than they thought it would be. After hearing Grandpa's mythical story about a moose, the babies go look for one in the backyard.
7	7	"Grandpa's Teeth"	Howard E. Baker	Ben Herndon & Margot Pipkin	October 6, 1991	007
7	7	"Momma Trauma"	Howard E. Baker	Steve Viksten & Joe Ansolabehere	October 6, 1991	007
At a picnic, Grandpa is warned to keep his dentures in his mouth. However, he removes them regardless, and Spike steals his teeth while he is busy with the food. Tommy and Chuckie try to get the teeth back because the war veterans are having a concert at the picnic, and Grandpa needs his teeth to play the trumpet properly. When Tommy draws on the walls, Didi insists on taking him to a therapist. While there, he sneaks away and goes for an adventure around the office building, while Stu ends up being psychoanalyzed.
8	8	"Real or Robots?" "Real or Robots"	Norton Virgien	Steve Viksten & Joe Ansolabehere	October 13, 1991	008
8	8	"Special Delivery"	Norton Virgien	Patric Verrone & Maiya Williams	October 13, 1991	008
After seeing a Frankenstein-type horror flick, Tommy and Chuckie want to see whether Stu is a human or a robot. Stu, however, has a recurring sleepwalking dream, in which he is the host of a cooking show. Tommy and Chuckie accidentally wakes him up after using a wrench on his belly button and Didi calls him out for not going to see a psychiatrist in dealing with his sleepwalking issues. Stu orders a doll from his competitor Eggbert Toys, called "Tina Trousers", and Didi tells Tommy the doll is his baby sister arriving in the mail. Believing this, Tommy sneaks out with the mailman to the post office, causing trouble as he does.
9	9	"Candy Bar Creep Show" "Candy Bar Creepshow"	Howard E. Baker	Tom Abrams & David Howard	October 27, 1991	009
9	9	"Monster in the Garage"	Dan Thompson	Peter Gaffney	October 27, 1991	009
The Pickles set up a haunted house for the neighborhood children on Halloween. As treats, they pass out "Reptar Bars", which contain "chocolate, and nuts, and caramel, and green stuff". The Rugrats go to the haunted house to search for them, eventually scaring Angelica and Grandpa as well. A mouse is loose in the Pickles' garage and house, knocking things off of the shelves, and Stu places the blame on Spike. The Rugrats set out to prove Spike's innocence; after hearing Boris' story about a hero fighting off the "dibbick" monster with his "klobbermeister", the Rugrats go into the garage in search of this "monster".
10	10	"Weaning Tommy"	Howard E. Baker	Ann Hamilton	November 10, 1991	010
10	10	"Incident in Aisle Seven" (Note: Originally called "They're Round, They're Mean, They Turn Milk Green") "Incident at Aisle 7"	Dan Thompson	Lou Greenstein & Larry Loebell	November 10, 1991	010
On advice from Dr. Homer, Tommy's dentist, Stu, and Didi take his bottles away from him and try to coax him into drinking from a sippy cup. He isn't happy about it and wants his bottle. Even Grandpa agrees and this leads to an argument between them when he attempts to keep Tommy on the bottle. Stu and Didi later agree to return him to the bottle after Grandpa convinces them to see how unhappy he really is with the sippy cup. Grandpa takes Tommy to the supermarket where Tommy makes a huge mess while looking for the new Reptar cereal.
11	11	"Touchdown Tommy" "Touch-Down Tommy"	Norton Virgien	Tom Abrams & David Howard	November 24, 1991	011
11	11	"The Trial"	Norton Virgien	Paul Germain	November 24, 1991	011
While Didi and Betty go shopping, Stu and the guys babysit the Rugrats while watching the "Ultra Bowl XXXVII" on TV. Later, Grandpa gives Tommy a bottle of chocolate milk; Angelica, who normally thinks that she is too old for baby bottles, fights Tommy over it, which sends the Rugrats into their own "football" game over the bottle. Someone broke "Mr. Fluffles," Tommy's clown lamp, and Angelica wants to find out who the lamp in evil, so the Rugrats hold a mock trial. The trial ends up revealing that Angelica was the one who broke the lamp, and she ends up in the high chair as a punishment when Didi picks up Angelica.
12	12	"Fluffy vs. Spike"	Dan Thompson	Steve Viksten & Joe Ansolabehere	December 8, 1991	012
12	12	"Reptar's Revenge"	Dan Thompson	Peter Gaffney	December 8, 1991	012
Angelica brings Fluffy, her pet cat, to Tommy's house. Fluffy ends up making a mess of things, but Angelica blames Fluffy's crimes on Spike, so the Rugrats attempt to prove him innocent. The Rugrats go looking for Reptar at the Sleazola Bros. fair. This Reptar, however, is a cereal addict named Leo.
13	13	"Graham Canyon"	Craig Bartlett	Craig Bartlett	December 22, 1991	013
13	13	"Stu-Maker's Elves"	Craig Bartlett	Steve Viksten & Joe Ansolabehere	December 22, 1991	013
The Pickles experience car trouble en route to the Grand Canyon/Grand Canyon National Park in Arizona. Eddie and Ace, a couple of crooked auto mechanics working at "Twin Cactus Auto Repair", try to make a simple, cheap thing more expensive, but Angelica and Tommy inadvertently stop them from further damage while playing in a "canyon" of tires. Stu has received an order from Mucklehoney Industries for 15,000 "Patty Pants" dolls. However, he is having trouble with the machine, but Tommy and Chuckie accidentally fix it while fetching the "Zippo-Glider", which Chuckie has accidentally tossed into the basement.

=== Season 2 (1992–93) ===
No. overall	No. in season	Title	Directed by	Written by	Original release date	Prod. code	U.S. households (in millions)
14	1	"Chuckie vs. the Potty" (Note: Originally called "Chuckie Versus the Potty")	Norton Virgien	Joe Ansolabehere	September 13, 1992	015	N/A
14	1	"Together at Last"	Steven Dean Moore	Jonathan Greenberg	September 13, 1992	015	N/A
Chuckie has a difficult decision to make: spend the rest of his life in diapers, or learn to use the potty. A nightmare has his friends forcing him on the toilet, which inspires him to use the potty for the first time. When Phil and Lil have a huge fight, Betty decides to separate them for a while and takes Lil to play with Tommy and Chuckie. Lil soon misses her brother and the three babies decide to head next door, not realizing Phil is doing the same thing.
15	2	"Toy Palace"	Dan Thompson	Peter Gaffney	September 20, 1992	014	N/A
15	2	"Sand Ho!" (Note: Originally called "Yo-Ho-Ho and a Bottle o' Milk")	Howard E. Baker & Jim Duffy	Peter Gaffney	September 20, 1992	014	N/A
After wandering away from their fathers, Tommy and Chuckie unwittingly end up playing around in a closed toy store, which they never want to leave. However, they become terrified of an electronic gorilla toy named Thorg who wants eat and try to get a giant Reptar toy to help them. Intrigued by Grandpa's pirate story, the Rugrats play "pirates" themselves.
16	3	"The Big House"	Jim Duffy	Paul Germain	September 27, 1992	016	N/A
16	3	"The Shot"	Dan Thompson	Joe Ansolabehere	September 27, 1992	016	N/A
While Didi is running some errands, she leaves Tommy at a maximum-security daycare center. Desperate for freedom, Tommy contemplates escaping with help from the other babies there. Tommy is due to get a booster shot but soon worries about the shot after hearing Chuckie's horror story about his, but in the end it is not as bad as he thought it was.
17	4	"Showdown at Teeter Totter Gulch"	Steven Dean Moore	Glenn Eichler	October 4, 1992	017	N/A
17	4	"Mirrorland"	Norton Virgien	Michael Ferris	October 4, 1992	017	N/A
Tommy and Chuckie match wits with Prudence, a.k.a. "The Junk Food Kid", the local playground bully at a Wild-West-themed playground. Chuckie and Tommy decide to go through a mirror to see "Mirrorland" where "everything is the same, only different", with Didi and Grandpa's examination of various antiques making them believe they really did cross over.
18	5	"Angelica's in Love"	Jim Duffy	Paul Germain	October 11, 1992	018	N/A
18	5	"Ice Cream Mountain" "Maximum Golf"	Dan Thompson	Chip Johannessen	October 11, 1992	018	N/A
Angelica falls in love with Dean, a biker-type kid who is described as "a 4-year-old's dream on a 5-year-old's bike". However, her heart is broken when he pledges his love to someone else: his mother. Stu and Drew intend to take the Rugrats out for ice cream, but when they pass "Fun Land", a miniature golf course, they decide to stop to play a round of golf. While there, the Rugrats try to reach "Ice Cream Mountain", a gargantuan sundae (not knowing it is made of plastic).
19	6	"Regarding Stuie"	Norton Virgien	Guy Maxtone-Graham	October 18, 1992	019	N/A
19	6	"Garage Sale"	Steven Dean Moore	Steve Viksten	October 18, 1992	019	N/A
Stu falls off the roof while attempting to install his new "Quack-O-Matic" weather vane. Suffering from a strange amnesia, Stu reverts to his childhood (as "Stuie") and becomes friends with the Rugrats. The babies have fun with Stuie for a while, but Tommy soon starts to miss his father which leads to him returning to his original self. To make room for some new stuff (including Stu's new stereo), the Pickles sell their unwanted goods at their garage sale. However, thanks to the babies, they end up unintentionally selling everything in the house.
20	7	"Let There Be Light"	Dan Thompson	Pam Wick	October 25, 1992	020	N/A
20	7	"The Bank Trick"	Jim Duffy	Earl Klasky & Gary Gurner	October 25, 1992	020	N/A
While working on the anti-gravity playpen (his latest invention), Stu blacks out the neighborhood. Being afraid of the dark and wondering where the light is hiding, the Rugrats look for the light in the most logical place: the fridge. After ruining Grandpa's chess game (being played by mail), Didi takes Tommy and Chuckie on her errands. While at the bank, Tommy and Chuckie wander around, looking for the "M&M machine" (the automated teller machine (ATM)), while inadvertently foiling a bank robbery by two crooks posing as bank examiners.
21	8	"Family Reunion"	Steven Dean Moore	Peter Gaffney	November 1, 1992	021	N/A
21	8	"Grandpa's Date"	Norton Virgien	Steve Viksten & Joe Ansolabehere	November 1, 1992	021	N/A
The Pickles family reunion is held in Iowa, hosted by Hugh Pickles and his wife, Dotti. While there, Angelica tells Tommy and the other babies that reunions are swap meets for babies, with the babies being swapped to different parents. Grandpa's fun night with Tommy and Chuckie is interrupted when, after 40 years, his long-lost girlfriend named Morgana pays a visit to him. Lou, not wanting Morgana to know that he is a grandfather, rushes Tommy and Chuckie to bed early. Naturally, the boys try to figure out why and end up causing trouble with Stu's mechanical couch. When Morgana finds out about the babies, she is delighted to know that Lou is a grandfather.
22	9	"No Bones About It"	Dan Thompson	David Benavente & Michael J. Benavente	November 8, 1992	022	N/A
22	9	"Beach Blanket Babies" "On the Beach"	Jim Duffy	Mark Trafficante & James Grant Goldin	November 8, 1992	022	N/A
Grandpa takes the Rugrats to the natural history museum. Later, the Rugrats dismantle a dinosaur while looking for a bone for Spike. Meanwhile, Grandpa locks horns with the strict security chief Sally Payson, while rushing around the museum looking for the Rugrats. The Pickles and the Finsters go to the beach. Chuckie has a personal mission, which is to set free the "Sea Moneys" (Sea Monkeys) that his dad gave him.
23	10	"Reptar on Ice"	Howard E. Baker	Peter Gaffney	November 15, 1992	023	N/A
23	10	"Family Feud"	Norton Virgien	Michael Ferris	November 15, 1992	023	N/A
After finding a lizard, which the Rugrats think is "Reptar's baby", they try to present it to him at "Reptar on Ice", an "Ice Capades"-type show. The problem is that the actor playing Reptar is afraid of lizards—and is not too fond of children, either. After a game of charades between the Pickles and the DeVilles ends up causing a huge argument, the families abruptly end their friendship and wage war, upsetting the babies. While Chas is stuck in the middle, having to return everything the neighbors borrowed from each other as well as listen to their constant bickering, Tommy is upset as he is not allowed to play with Phil and Lil anymore.
24	11	"Superhero Chuckie"	Dan Thompson	Douglas Petrie	November 22, 1992	024	N/A
24	11	"The Dog Broomer"	Jim Duffy	Gary Glasberg	November 22, 1992	024	N/A
Chuckie thinks that he is really a superhero after seeing a taping of "Captain Blasto" (voiced by Adam West). The babies try to protect Spike from the "dog broomer" (a dog groomer).
25	12	"Aunt Miriam"	Howard E. Baker	Peter Gaffney	November 29, 1992	025	N/A
25	12	"The Inside Story"	Norton Virgien	Holly Huckins	November 29, 1992	025	N/A
Aunt Miriam (Andrea Martin) is mistaken for an evil alien by Tommy and Chuckie when she comes to visit. After Chuckie swallows a watermelon seed, the babies are forced to shrink down with a laser beam and enter his body to retrieve it after Angelica tells them it will grow inside his stomach and explode. However, it turns out that the entire journey was a dream, and that the babies never shrunk down.
26	13	"The Santa Experience"	Charles Swenson	Joe Ansolabehere, Peter Gaffney, Paul Germain & Jonathan Greenberg	December 6, 1992	027	N/A
After a traumatic Santa visit in the mall, the babies' parents rent a cabin in the mountains in which to spend Christmas. Meanwhile, Chuckie is scared of Santa and wants to stop him from coming, while Angelica tries to right a wrong involving Phil and Lil's toys and presents.
27	14	"A Visit from Lipschitz"	Jim Duffy	Jonathan Greenberg	December 13, 1992	026	N/A
27	14	"What the Big People Do"	Dan Thompson	Patricia Marx	December 13, 1992	026	N/A
Dr. Lipschitz (Tony Jay), the famous child psychologist whose advice Didi always follows, visits the Pickles but is not prepared for an encounter with the babies. Tommy and Chuckie imagine their lives as adults, but realize later that it's better to be young.
28	15	"Visitors from Outer Space"	Dan Thompson & Raymie Muzquiz	Paul Germain	December 20, 1992	028	N/A
28	15	"The Case of the Missing Rugrat"	Howard E. Baker	Peter Gaffney	December 20, 1992	028	N/A
Tommy dreams that he and the other Rugrats are captured by aliens that resemble his parents, pet dog and his grandfather. Angelica steals a planet-atomizing remote from Stuvon (Stu as an alien) and escapes with help from a talking fish. Meanwhile, the babies wander into the ship's control room and play with the controls, thinking that they are toys. Grandpa uses his skills from working as a detective in the 1930's to look for Tommy after he winds up at the mansion home of two eccentric sisters.
29	16	"Chuckie Loses His Glasses"	Norton Virgien	Rachel Lipman	December 27, 1992	029	N/A
29	16	"Chuckie Gets Skunked"	Jim Duffy & Pete Michels	Peter Gaffney	December 27, 1992	029	N/A
Chuckie's eyeglasses disappear during a game of hide-and-seek, and he has trouble finding his friends without them. A skunk sprays Chuckie, and both the grown-ups and babies try to do something about the terrible smell.
30	17	"Rebel Without a Teddy Bear"	Dan Thompson	Jonathan Greenberg	January 3, 1993	030	N/A
30	17	"Angelica the Magnificent"	Igor Kovalyov	Michael Ferris	January 3, 1993	030	N/A
When Tommy's favorite stuffed lion gets filthy, Didi confiscates it for a cleaning. Tommy is greatly upset by this, thinking he will never see the stuffed animal again, and Angelica helps Tommy "go bad" to get what he wants. Angelica experiments with magic and Lil goes missing in the process. This leads to the belief that Angelica made Lil disappear.
31	18	"Meet the Carmichaels"	Jim Duffy & Rick Bugental	Steve Viksten & Joe Ansolabehere	January 10, 1993	031	N/A
31	18	"The Box"	Norton Virgien & Jeff McGrath	Michael Ferris	January 10, 1993	031	N/A
New neighbors move in across the street from the Pickles, where Tommy helps the youngest member of the family, Susie (Cree Summer), find her new room. Stu buys a self-assembly theme-park toy for Tommy but finds it too complicated to build. Meanwhile, the babies quickly find something even more fun: the box that the toy came in.
32	19	"Down the Drain"	Dan Thompson	Joe Ansolabehere	January 17, 1993	032	N/A
32	19	"Let Them Eat Cake"	Steven Dean Moore	Steve Viksten	January 17, 1993	032	N/A
Tommy and Chuckie are afraid of being sucked down the drain, so they clog it in various ways to avoid having to take a bath. The gang attends Didi's brother's wedding, where Tommy and Chuckie seek cake.
33	20	"The Seven Voyages of Cynthia"	Norton Virgien	Craig Bartlett	April 11, 1993	033	1.69
33	20	"My Friend Barney"	Jim Duffy & Steve Socki	Peter Gaffney & Paul Germain	April 11, 1993	033	1.69
Tommy and Chuckie accidentally lose Angelica's favorite doll, Cynthia, while Stu and Drew wash Drew's boat. While Angelica holds a funeral for Cynthia, Spike manages to find the doll. Chuckie has an imaginary friend named Barney.
34	21	"Feeding Hubert"	Dan Thompson	Jeffrey Townsend	April 18, 1993	034	1.62
34	21	"Spike the Wonder Dog"	Igor Kovalyov	Steve Viksten	April 18, 1993	034	1.62
The babies mistake a garbage truck for a monster that eats trash. After watching a TV show about a superhero dog named "Oodles the Talking Poodle" the babies wish Spike can talk, and be a superhero as well. They get their wish when Angelica fools them with her toy executive telephone into thinking Spike can talk – instead being a scheme created by her to obtain the cookie jar. But in the end, Spike becomes the hero the babies always wished him up to be.
35	22	"The Slide"	Norton Virgien	Joe Ansolabehere	April 25, 1993	035	1.86
35	22	"The Big Flush"	Jim Duffy	Lisa Latham	April 25, 1993	035	1.86
Chuckie is afraid to go down the playground slide after accidentally getting on a giant slide at a pizza place. After Angelica intimidates him, the babies consult Susie, and she trains Chuckie to be "the bestest slider in the whole wide park". The babies mistake a swimming pool for a giant potty, and set out to try to find the flusher. Meanwhile, Stu is struggling to overcome his fear of diving.
36	23	"King Ten Pin"	Dan Thompson	Doria Biddle	May 2, 1993	036	1.52
36	23	"Runaway Angelica"	Steven Dean Moore	Steve Viksten	May 2, 1993	036	1.52
Grandpa competes in a bowling tournament, where Tommy and the others inadvertently help Grandpa win by exposing his bowling rival (Tom Bosley) as a cheater. Angelica runs away from home and hides in the Pickles' backyard after being sent to her room for ruining her father's office. She later realizes her mistake when it starts raining and she has to live in Spike's doghouse, and thinks her father is happy that she ran away when in reality he is not.
37	24	"Game Show Didi"	Jim Duffy	Andy Houts	May 9, 1993	037	1.61
37	24	"Toys in the Attic"	Norton Virgien	John O'Brien	May 9, 1993	037	1.61
Didi appears on a TV game show. Guest stars: Alex Trebek and Charles Nelson Reilly Tommy and Angelica are left to stay with Boris and Minka for the weekend, where they discover toys (and some family history) in their attic.
38	25	"Driving Miss Angelica"	Dan Thompson & Raymie Muzquiz	Jonathan Greenberg	May 16, 1993	038	1.54
38	25	"Susie vs. Angelica"	Igor Kovalyov	Joe Ansolabehere	May 16, 1993	038	1.54
After Angelica saves Chuckie's life from nearly being hit by a gang of big-wheelers, she takes advantage of the debt he owes to her by making him become her personal slave. Until she gets a taste of her own medicine at the end. When Susie attempts to defend the babies from Angelica, the two compete to see who is the best.
39	26	"Tooth or Dare"	Norton Virgien	Paul Germain & Jonathan Greenberg	May 23, 1993	039	1.70
39	26	"Party Animals"	Jim Duffy	Holly Huckins	May 23, 1993	039	1.70
Angelica schemes to pull out and steal Chuckie's teeth to get money from the tooth fairy. The grown-ups throw a costume party, and the babies think that everybody's costumes are real, including Didi's cousin Bucky who's dressed as a baby, after they rub a magic lamp.

=== Season 3 (1993–95) ===
This is the final season of which Sherry Gunther was executive in charge of production.

No. overall	No. in season	Title	Directed by	Written by	Original release date	Prod. code	Viewers (millions)
40	1	"Dummi Bear Dinner Disaster"	Jim Duffy	Rachel Lipman	September 26, 1993	040	2.03 (HH) (Note: (HH) indicates the amount of households an episode was viewed in when it premiered.)
40	1	"Twins' Pique"	Norton Virgien	Paul Germain	September 26, 1993	040	2.03 (HH)
When the grown-ups hear that Randy Carmichael is having the creator of Dummi Bears over for dinner, the grown-ups invite themselves. While the adults are keen to impress, the babies scheme to ruin it as Susie fears she might have to move. Phil and Lil are tired of being mistaken for each other and yearn to be different, so they decide to change their personalities. While Phil decides to model himself like Chuckie, Lil chooses Angelica as her mentor.
41	2	"Chuckie's First Haircut"	Howard E. Baker	Written by: Peter Gaffney & Jonathan Greenberg; Idea by: R.E. Daniels	October 3, 1993	041	1.85 (HH)
41	2	"Cool Hand Angelica"	Jim Duffy	Peter Gaffney	October 3, 1993	041	1.85 (HH)
With Chuckie's hair getting longer and longer, Chas decides to get him a haircut. With Chuckie too scared to sit under the scissors, the babies and grown-ups use different methods to try and show him there's nothing to worry about. When Susie tells the babies about her time at an upcoming day camp, Angelica boasts she'd have no problem there. Eager to prove her wrong, Susie arranges for Angelica to join her.
42	3	"Tricycle Thief" "The Tricycle Thief"	Norton Virgien	Glenn Eichler	October 10, 1993	042	N/A
42	3	"Rhinoceritis"	Jim Duffy	Doria Biddle	October 10, 1993	042	N/A
When Susie's brand-new tricycle goes missing, she and the babies suspect Angelica is responsible and put her on trial. Angelica, after watching an episode of "Binks McGill – Preteen Brain Surgeon", tells Chuckie that he is turning into a rhinoceros when she pretends to be a doctor; meanwhile, Drew helps Stu with his taxes.
43	4	"Grandpa Moves Out"	Howard E. Baker	Jonathan Greenberg	October 17, 1993	043	2.07 (HH)
43	4	"The Legend of Satchmo" "Legend of Satchmo"	Jim Duffy	Matt Uitz	October 17, 1993	043	2.07 (HH)
Grandpa moves into a retirement home after feeling unappreciated by Stu and Didi. During a visit to there, Tommy and Angelica cause trouble trying to get Grandpa back. The babies go camping in the backyard, and things turn bad at night when they fear that a "Satchmo" will capture them.
44	5	"Circus Angelicus"	Norton Virgien & Jeff McGrath	Larry Doyle	October 24, 1993	044	1.59 (HH)
44	5	"The Stork"	Jim Duffy	Deborah Raznick & Daniel Benton	October 24, 1993	044	1.59 (HH)
Angelica and the babies stage a "circus" of their own after they are forced to leave a real one due to Chuckie's fear of clowns. Tommy thinks that he is getting a new baby brother, and tries to protect it.
45	6	"The Baby Vanishes"	Howard E. Baker	Rachel Lipman	November 7, 1993	045	1.87 (HH)
45	6	"Farewell, My Friend"	Jim Duffy	Samuel S. Williams	November 7, 1993	045	1.87 (HH)
Angelica uses vanishing cream to try to steal desserts while Drew tries to deal with Angelica's misbehavior, along with the other adults who pretend not to notice her. When Chuckie's glasses break during an adventure, he decides to stop going on them causing a rift between him and Tommy.
46	7	"When Wishes Come True"	Norton Virgien	Written by: Joe Ansolabehere; Idea by: Samuel S. Williams	November 14, 1993	046	1.87 (HH)
46	7	"Angelica Breaks a Leg" "Angelica Breaks Her Leg"	Jim Duffy	Written by: Steve Viksten; Idea by: Lisa Latham	November 14, 1993	046	1.87 (HH)
The babies think that Angelica has turned into stone after a bad wish. In actuality, it is a statue of Angelica – Drew's anniversary gift to Charlotte. While staying at Stu and Didi's for a week, Angelica fakes a broken leg to get more attention. She has a great time using a buzzer (which Stu set up) to get attention at all times, stressing out her aunt and uncle in the process. However, when Stu and Didi discover Angelica never had a broken leg and the doctor had mixed up her x-ray with that of a football player, they are relieved. Yet she gets a taste of her own medicine when Drew forces her to help him take care of Charlotte, who had actually broken her leg during their rafting trip in the woods.
47	8	"The Last Babysitter"	Howard E. Baker	Peter Gaffney	November 21, 1993	047	N/A
47	8	"Sour Pickles"	Jim Duffy	Scott Schneid & Tony Michelman	November 21, 1993	047	N/A
Susie's older sister, Alisa, babysits for her younger siblings and Tommy, but things go awry when a "monster" appears. Grandpa recalls a turning point in the childhood of Stu and Drew when Angelica gets a kaleidoscope.
48	9	"Reptar 2010"	Norton Virgien	Paul Germain & Peter Gaffney	November 28, 1993	048	N/A
48	9	"Stu Gets a Job"	Jim Duffy	Michael Kramer	November 28, 1993	048	N/A
When watching a Reptar movie, the tape breaks. As Grandpa tries to get it working, the babies supply their own ending. The episode title of "Reptar 2010" is the same title as the last level in Rugrats: Search for Reptar. After Stu fails to make a perfect toy, he gets a job and is unavailable to spend time with Tommy. Tommy tries to prevent his dad from going to work, and Stu believes that what Tommy is doing is actually what Drew is doing.
49	10	"Give & Take" "Give and Take"	Howard E. Baker	Rachel Lipman	December 12, 1993	049	N/A
49	10	"The Gold Rush"	Jim Duffy	Doria Biddle	December 12, 1993	049	N/A
Tommy plays with an inflatable clown that Stu made for him, but accidentally gives it to Chuckie, who has a great time with it. Only when Angelica points out his fear of clowns does Chuckie realize his mistake. When the babies find a nickel on the playground, Angelica sees a golden opportunity to get rich and puts the babies to work searching for more (throwing away other "junk" like $100 bills and jeweled rings in the process).
50	11	"Home Movies" "Home Movie"	Norton Virgien	Written by: Joe Ansolabehere; Idea by: Norton Virgien	December 26, 1993	050	N/A
50	11	"The Mysterious Mr. Friend"	Jim Duffy	Michael Ferris	December 26, 1993	050	N/A
After being bored by Stu's home movies, the babies make "films" about their lives. The home movies are drawn up by the writers' children in this episode. Stu designs a new toy called Mr. Friend and gives the first one made to Tommy. Although Stu believes he loves it, Tommy is actually scared of the toy (thanks to its strange design and voice) and works with his friends to get rid of it.
51	12	"Cuffed!" "Cuffed"	Jim Duffy	Steve Viksten	January 2, 1994	051	1.95 (HH)
51	12	"The Blizzard"	Howard E. Baker	Samuel S. Williams	January 2, 1994	051	1.95 (HH)
Angelica accidentally handcuffs herself to Chuckie with a gift that is being sent to charity, and things get worse when she loses the key. A snowstorm comes to the neighborhood, and the babies imagine they are sledding to the North Pole.
52	13	"Princess Angelica"	Jim Duffy	Rachel Lipman	January 9, 1994	053	N/A
52	13	"The Odd Couple"	Howard E. Baker	Jonathan Greenberg	January 9, 1994	053	N/A
Angelica thinks that she is royalty when she overhears her parents, and schemes to go to her "castle". Tommy stays at Chuckie's house for the long weekend, and both of them learn that "you don't really know someone until you live with them".
53	14	"Destination: Moon" "Destination Moon"	Norton Virgien	Michael Ferris	January 16, 1994	052	N/A
53	14	"Angelica's Birthday"	Jim Duffy	Andy Houts	January 16, 1994	052	N/A
The babies pretend that Grandpa's new trailer is a spaceship, and go to the "moon" to find Chuckie's toy rocket. On the day of her birthday party, Angelica wants to be a baby to avoid the responsibilities that come with getting older.
54	15	"Naked Tommy"	Norton Virgien	Larry Doyle	January 23, 1994	054	N/A
54	15	"Tommy and the Secret Club"	Jim Duffy	Barbara Slade	January 23, 1994	054	N/A
Tommy wants to shed his clothes to be like his dog, Spike, so he tries out naturism. The other Rugrats join in, with the exception of Chuckie; Stu attempts to keep Tommy's clothes on. Angelica forces the babies to compete to see who gets to be in her club.
55	16	"Under Chuckie's Bed"	Howard E. Baker & Steve Socki	Joe Ansolabehere	February 6, 1994	055	1.88 (HH)
55	16	"Chuckie is Rich"	Jim Duffy	Peter Gaffney	February 6, 1994	055	1.88 (HH)
Chuckie thinks that there are monsters living underneath his new "big boy" bed, but Tommy ventures under it to prove otherwise. Chas wins ten million dollars from a sweepstakes and lets wealth go to his head. Guest star: Pat Sajak as himself
56	17	"Mommy's Little Assets"	Norton Virgien	Doria Biddle	February 20, 1994	056	N/A
56	17	"Chuckie's Wonderful Life"	Jim Duffy	Written by: Paul Germain & Jonathan Greenberg; Idea by: Samuel S. Williams	February 20, 1994	056	N/A
Charlotte is forced to take Angelica and Tommy to work with her, where they nearly ruin an important business deal. After Chas's favorite CD vanishes and Chuckie feels responsible, Angelica convinces him the world would be better off without him. As he is running away, he runs into an angel who shows him how things would be worse for his friends without him.
57	18	"In the Dreamtime" "In the Dream Time"	Howard E. Baker & Steve Socki	Peter Gaffney	February 27, 1994	057	2.01 (HH)
57	18	"The Unfair Pair"	Jim Duffy	Rachel Lipman	February 27, 1994	057	2.01 (HH)
Chuckie has a very hard time distinguishing dreams from reality. Angelica worries Phil and Lil about which one is "their parents' favorite".
58	19	"Chuckie's Red Hair"	Jeff McGrath	Jonathan Greenburg	March 6, 1994	058	N/A
58	19	"Spike Runs Away"	Jim Duffy	Peter Gaffney	March 6, 1994	058	N/A
Chuckie is tired of standing out because of his red hair, so he uses Grandpa's hair dye. He soon finds that not being noticed is not as good as he thinks. Spike runs away from home and does not return, which leaves Tommy unhappy. Stu and Didi are also upset and decide to try and find a replacement pet, but nothing works.
59	20	"The Alien"	Steve Socki	Written by: Jonathan Greenburg; Idea by: Bruce Henkin	March 20, 1994	059	2.01 (HH)
59	20	"Mr. Clean"	Jim Duffy	Written by: Rachel Lipman; Idea by: Jonathan Blum	March 20, 1994	059	2.01 (HH)
Angelica convinces Tommy, Phil and Lil that Chuckie is an alien. Chuckie becomes a neat freak after his father tells him about germs.
60	21	"Angelica's Worst Nightmare"	Jeff McGrath	Steve Viksten	October 8, 1994	060	1.71 (HH)
60	21	"The Mega Diaper Babies"	Jim Duffy	Joe Ansolabehere	October 8, 1994	060	1.71 (HH)
Charlotte announces that she may be pregnant, which frightens Angelica to the point of her having a nightmare about being rejected by her parents and her new baby sibling threatening her. The babies pretend to be superheroes to get back the action figures of their favorite TV heroes from Angelica.
61	22	"New Kid in Town"	Steve Socki	Rachel Lipman	October 15, 1994	061	N/A
61	22	"Pickles vs. Pickles"	Jim Duffy	Paul Germain & Jonathan Greenberg	October 15, 1994	061	N/A
Tired of being picked on by Angelica, the babies meet a boy named Josh, who turns out to be even worse. After Drew punishes Angelica, he worries when she tells him he will regret it. He then has a nightmare in which Angelica hires a lawyer and sues him.
62	23	"Kid TV"	Jeff McGrath	Written by: Michael Ferris; Idea by: Matt Vitz	October 22, 1994	063	1.78 (HH)
62	23	"The Sky is Falling"	Jim Duffy	Peter Gaffney	October 22, 1994	063	1.78 (HH)
The babies create their own TV shows after Stu breaks the TV set. Angelica tells the babies that it is the "end of the world", but then believes it herself.
63	24	"I Remember Melville"	Steve Socki	Barbera Slade	November 5, 1994	064	N/A
63	24	"No More Cookies"	Jim Duffy	Jonathan Greenberg	November 5, 1994	064	N/A
Chuckie's pet pill bug dies, and he has trouble dealing with the loss. Angelica swears off cookies after she suffers a stomachache but, after several failed attempts to get more, she reminisces about her first experiences with them.
64	25	"Cradle Attraction"	Jeff McGrath & Steve Socki	Peter Gaffney, Paul Germain, Jonathan Greenberg & Rachel Lipman	November 12, 1994	065	1.79 (HH)
64	25	"Moving Away" "Angelica's Moving Away"	Jim Duffy	Peter Gaffney, Paul Germain, Jonathan Greenberg & Rachel Lipman	November 12, 1994	065	1.79 (HH)
Chuckie falls for a new girl named Megan who tries to get his attention by bullying him. Angelica's announcement that she may be moving delights the babies – until they recall how they first met.
65	26	"A Rugrats Passover" "Rugrats Passover"	Jeff McGrath, Jim Duffy & Steve Socki	Peter Gaffney, Paul Germain, Jonathan Greenberg & Rachel Lipman	April 13, 1995	062	3.1
While attending a Passover seder at Didi's parents' house, Boris and the children (and later, most of the adults), get locked in the attic because the door does not open from the inside. To pass the time, Boris tells the children the story of why Jews celebrate Passover, and how Moses saved his people from slavery. This is the last episode that Sherry Gunther executive produced.

=== Season 4 (1996–97) ===
After Sherry Gunther left Klasky-Csupo, Terry Thoren takes over as executive in charge of production in 1996.

No. overall	No. in season	Title	Directed by	Written by	Original release date	Prod. code	U.S. households (in millions)
66	1	"A Rugrats Chanukah" "Rugrats Chanukah"	Raymie Muzquiz	J. David Stem & David N. Weiss	December 4, 1996	999	3.08
The Rugrats celebrate Chanukah. Boris is scheduled to perform alongside his childhood rival in a play based on the holiday's origin story; Angelica tries to find a TV to watch a Christmas special, and Stu tries to make it to the synagogue.
67	2	"Mother's Day" "Rugrats Mother's Day"	Norton Virgien & Toni Vian	Jon Cooksey, Ali Marie Matheson, J. David Stem & David Weiss	May 6, 1997	998	2.91
The Rugrats celebrate Mother's Day, and Chuckie wonders about his late mother.
68	3	"Spike's Babies"	Rick Bugental	Story by : David Maples; Teleplay by : Mark Palmer	August 23, 1997	066	2.61
68	3	"Chicken Pops"	Jim Duffy	David Maples	August 23, 1997	066	2.61
Spike looks after some stray kittens while Stu prepares for a barbecue. Chuckie catches the chicken pox, which spreads to the other Rugrats, and they worry about turning into chickens.
69	4	"Radio Daze"	John Holmquist	Jon Cooksey & Ali Marie Matheson	August 30, 1997	067	2.52
69	4	"Psycho Angelica"	Celia Kendrick	Jon Cooksey & Ali Marie Matheson	August 30, 1997	067	2.52
Grandpa and the children listen to an old detective radio show from Grandpa Lou's childhood in the 1920's of the prohibition, and the babies imagine that they're living it. Angelica pretends to be a psychic to get goodies from the babies. Note: This episode was dedicated to writer Andy Houts
70	5	"America's Wackiest Home Movies"	Rick Bugental	Vinny Montello & Steve Ochs	September 6, 1997	068	2.38
70	5	"The 'Lympics"	Jim Duffy	David Maples	September 6, 1997	068	2.38
Stu and Drew compete against each other for a TV show prize by filming their children. Angelica meets Timmy McNulty, and makes the babies compete against his younger brothers in an Olympics-style event.
71	6	"The Carwash"	Celia Kendrick	Vinny Montello & Steve Ochs	September 13, 1997	069	2.74
71	6	"Heat Wave"	John Holmquist	David Maples	September 13, 1997	069	2.74
Stu takes the babies to the car wash after a little accident. Things get out of control, however, when Angelica takes over the car. A new friend helps the babies to search for water on a hot day, while Grandpa supervises the workers repairing the pipes.
72	7	"Faire Play"	John Holmquist	Vinny Montello & Steve Ochs	September 20, 1997	071	2.92
72	7	"The Smell of Success"	Celia Kendrick	Jon Cooksey & Ali Marie Matheson	September 20, 1997	071	2.92
The gang attends a medieval festival, where they deal with a robotic dragon controlled by Stu. Chuckie takes part in an experiment to improve his nasal congestion.
73	8	"Dust Bunnies"	John Holmquist	Kat Likkel	September 27, 1997	077	3.16
73	8	"Educating Angelica"	Celia Kendrick	Story by : Tom Szollosi & David Maples; Teleplay by : Tom Szollosi	September 27, 1997	077	3.16
The babies develop a fear of "dust bunnies" when the grown-ups clean the house. Angelica goes to preschool, and must learn to share after a bad moment. Having trouble doing so, she eventually decides to bring Tommy along with her.
74	9	"Angelica's Last Stand"	Rick Bugental	Vinny Montello & Steve Ochs	October 4, 1997	070	2.38
74	9	"Clan of the Duck""	Jim Duffy	Jon Cooksey & Ali Marie Matheson	October 4, 1997	070	2.38
The babies help Angelica with her lemonade stand, but they want some of Angelica's dimes, which she wants to keep all to herself. When Lil tells the boys that dresses are only for girls, Chuckie and Phil decide to wear dresses to see what it is like.
75	10	"Potty Training Spike"	Celia Kendrick	Story by : Jon Cooksey & Ali Marie Matheson; Teleplay by : David Maples	October 11, 1997	073	2.72
75	10	"The Art Fair"	John Holmquist	Vinny Montello & Steve Ochs	October 11, 1997	073	2.72
After being scolded for his own bad habits, Chuckie tries to potty-train Spike. Angelica creates a painting and thinks that she is a gifted artist, but the babies attempt to improve her creation when she is not in the room. They cause a mess when Angelica returns, but the grown-ups consider this a work of art and enter it into an art contest.
76	11	"Send in the Clouds"	Jim Duffy	Vinny Montello & Steve Ochs	October 18, 1997	074	2.69
76	11	"In the Naval"	Rick Bugental	Story by : Vinny Montello & Steve Ochs; Teleplay by : Kat Likkel	October 18, 1997	074	2.69
The babies mistake fog for being in the sky and try to keep anyone from going outside. While on a fishing trip, Angelica loses her doll, Cynthia, and Tommy and Chuckie try to get her back while pretending to be "Wavy Seals".
77	12	"The Mattress"	Celia Kendrick	Story by : Tom Carrico; Teleplay by : Tom Carrico & David Maples	November 1, 1997	075	3.03
77	12	"Looking for Jack"	Jim Duffy	Rick Gitelson	November 1, 1997	075	3.03
Grandpa has problems sleeping, so the others try to replace his mattress with a better one. Charlotte's van breaks down en route to a Dummi Bears concert, and Angelica is mistaken for the daughter of an Italian restaurant owner when she goes to ask for help.
78	13	"Ransom of Cynthia"	Rick Bugental	Monica Piper	November 8, 1997	078	2.86
78	13	"Turtle Recall"	John Holmquist	Story by : Jon Cooksey & Ali Marie Matheson; Teleplay by : Brian Swenlin & David Maples	November 8, 1997	078	2.86
To get the babies' candy, as well as a new and better Cynthia doll, Angelica fakes a ransom and makes the babies think Cynthia was stolen. Believing this, the Rugrats attempt to get Cynthia back. When the Rugrats figure out the ruse, Angelica's doll is found by Spike and she barfs from eating the babies' candy. While visiting the mall with Chas and Stu, the babies try to reunite a turtle with its father.
79	14	"Angelica Orders Out"	John Holmquist	Story by : Rick Gitelson & David Maples; Teleplay by : David Maples	November 15, 1997	079	3.13
79	14	"Let it Snow"	Jim Duffy	Vinny Montello & Steve Ochs	November 15, 1997	079	3.13
Angelica orders food from a deli—and then phones all of the other grown-ups—using Stu's voice-changer invention, which makes her sound exactly like Charlotte. When the Pickles take their family Christmas photo in August, the babies think that Santa Claus forgot about them.
80	15	"Angelica Nose Best"	Jim Duffy	Vinny Montello & Steve Ochs	November 22, 1997	080	2.97
80	15	"The Pirate Light" "Pirate Light"	Rick Bugental	Written by: Rick Gitelson; Idea by: Mariel Hope Cooksey	November 22, 1997	080	2.97
A mosquito bite causes Angelica to be honest, alluding to the story of Pinocchio. The babies think the furnace repairman (voiced by Andrew Dice Clay) is a pirate and tries to find Stu's "treasure" before him.

=== Season 5 (1998) ===
No. overall	No. in season	Title	Directed by	Written by	Original release date	Prod. code	Viewers (millions)
81	1	"Vacation" "Rugrats Vacation"	Toni Vian	Jon Cooksey & Ali Marie Matheson	May 29, 1998 (Note: The episode was released on the A Rugrats Vacation VHS on July 8, 1997.)	997	3.62 2.45 (HH)
The Rugrats go on a vacation to Las Vegas in an RV, where they cause their usual mayhem. Meanwhile, Tommy searches for "kitties" (white tigers).
82	2	"Babysitting Fluffy"	John Holmquist	Barbara Herndon & Jill Gorey	August 15, 1998	089	2.28 (HH)
82	2	"Sleep Trouble"	Anthony Bell	Story by : Bill Crounse & Don Pequignot; Teleplay by : Barbara Herndon & Jill Gorey	August 15, 1998	089	2.28 (HH)
When Angelica and her parents go away for the weekend, Chas and Chuckie look after Angelica's cat while she is away and underestimate the difficulty of doing so. Tommy and Chuckie fear "the Sandman" after a story while Chas is out at a party. Stu and Didi try to get them to fall asleep, but fall asleep themselves. Tommy and Chuckie then try to catch the Sandman, but end up catching Chas.
83	3	"The First Cut"	Rick Bugental	Story by : David Maples, Jon Cooksey, Ali Marie Matheson & Kate Boutilier; Teleplay by : Kate Boutilier	August 16, 1998	086	2.30 (HH)
83	3	"Chuckie Grows"	Jim Duffy	Story by : Rick Gitelson; Teleplay by : Rick Gitelson & Barbara Slade	August 16, 1998	086	2.30 (HH)
When Tommy saves a baby bird from a runner, he falls into a thorn bush and gets a cut, which frightens him. The babies think that Chuckie has gotten bigger when his shirt shrinks in the wash.
84	4	"The Wild Wild West"	Jim Duffy	Jon Hanish	August 17, 1998	088	2.74 (HH)
84	4	"Angelica for a Day"	Rick Bugental	Story by : Rick Gitelson, Daniel Goodman, Joshua Goodman, Jeffrey Goodman & Kenny Goodman; Teleplay by : Rick Gitelson	August 17, 1998	088	2.74 (HH)
The babies take part in a Western spoof to reclaim ice cream coupons from Angelica. Tommy dreams that Chuckie and Angelica switch personalities—Angelica is more timid while Chuckie turns mean and bratty.
85	5	"The Word of the Day"	Anthony Bell	Vinny Montello & Steve Ochs	August 18, 1998	083	2.85 (HH)
85	5	"Jonathan Babysits"	John Holmquist	Rick Gitelson	August 18, 1998	083	2.85 (HH)
Angelica learns a curse word from the host of her favorite children's show, Miss Carol's Happy House. Not knowing what it means or how negatively her parents will react, she begins to use it in her vocabulary. Jonathan looks after the babies while searching for ways to blackmail Charlotte.
86	6	"Grandpa's Bad Bug" "Grandpas' Bad Bug"	John Holmquist	Vinny Montello & Steve Ochs	August 19, 1998	081	2.95 (HH)
86	6	"Lady Luck"	Rick Bugental	Kat Likkel	August 19, 1998	081	2.95 (HH)
The babies fear there is a "bad bug" in Grandpa's bed and attempt to get it out. Grandpa takes the babies to a bingo game at the senior citizens' center. Note: This episode marked the final performance for David Doyle as Grandpa Lou and was dedicated in his memory. Joe Alaskey would succeed Doyle in this role for the remainder of the show's original run.
87	7	"Crime and Punishment"	Rick Bugental	David Maples	August 20, 1998	082	2.62 (HH)
87	7	"Baby Maybe"	Jim Duffy	Story by : Vinny Montello & Steve Ochs; Teleplay by : Monica Piper	August 20, 1998	082	2.62 (HH)
Angelica tells the babies that the police officers arrest bad people while Chas is dating a police officer. Chuckie accidentally breaks Chas' glasses and fears that he will be arrested. Didi's brother and sister-in-law consider having a baby, and to prove it, they babysit the babies while Stu, Didi, and the other grown-ups leave for an opera. The chore, however, becomes harder than the sitters hoped it would be.
88	8	"He Saw, She Saw"	Rick Bugental	David Maples	August 21, 1998	084	N/A
88	8	"Piggy's Pizza Palace"	Jim Duffy	Story by : Vinny Montello & Steve Ochs; Teleplay by : Melody Fox	August 21, 1998	084	N/A
Chuckie's latest crush has an over-protective brother. The gang goes to a pizzeria that resembles Chuck E. Cheese's and tries to get Angelica's tickets back from a pig that "stole" them. Meanwhile, Stu and Drew attempt to beat one another's high score at a Reptar pinball game.
89	9	"Fugitive Tommy"	John Holmquist	Vinny Montello & Steve Ochs	August 22, 1998	085	N/A
89	9	"Visiting Aunt Miriam"	Anthony Bell	Rick Gitelson	August 22, 1998	085	N/A
Tommy is mistaken for another troublemaking baby with a big tooth, but he attempts to prove his innocence. When Grandpa Lou takes the babies to Aunt Miriam's to play cards, the babies are convinced that she and her friends plan to eat Chuckie and attempt to protect him.
90	10	"Uneasy Rider"	John Holmquist	Story by : Ali Marie Matheson, Jon Cooksey & Monica Piper; Teleplay by : Monica Piper	August 29, 1998	087	N/A
90	10	"Where's Grandpa?"	Anthony Bell	Vinny Montello & Steve Ochs	August 29, 1998	087	N/A
Chuckie is nervous about riding his new two-wheeled bicycle. Stu and Didi accidentally leave Grandpa behind on a road trip, and Tommy and Chuckie try to give Grandpa a chance to catch up.
91	11	"Hiccups"	Rick Bugental	Bill Braunstein	September 12, 1998	076	2.29 (HH)
91	11	"Autumn Leaves"	Jim Duffy	Rick Gitelson	September 12, 1998	076	2.29 (HH)
Tommy gets hiccups, and the babies' attempts to scare him do not cure him. A change of season makes the babies think that the trees are ill, so they apply whatever remedies they think of to them.
92	12	"Journey to the Center of the Basement"	Rick Bugental	Vinny Montello & Steve Ochs	September 19, 1998	090	2.22 (HH)
92	12	"A Very McNulty Birthday"	Jim Duffy	Story by : David Maples & Kate Boutilier; Teleplay by : Kate Boutilier; Additional Material by : Rick Gitelson, Vinny Montello & Steve Ochs	September 19, 1998	090	2.22 (HH)
The babies go down to the basement to retrieve Chuckie's robotic Reptar toy. The babies attend Timmy McNulty's birthday party, where girls are left out due to cooties.
93	13	"The Family Tree" "Rugrats Family Tree"	Jim Duffy	Story by : Rick Gitelson, Jill Gorey, Barbara Herndon, Vinny Montello, Steve Ochs & Monica Piper; Teleplay by : Rick Gitelson, Vinny Montello & Steve Ochs	September 21, 1998	091	3.11 (HH)
While Didi and Stu go on an anniversary vacation, Tommy and Angelica stay at Chuckie's house, where Chuckie learns about his ancestors. Meanwhile, Didi starts to feel seasick, and the cause is eventually revealed to be pregnancy.
94	14	"The Turkey Who Came to Dinner" "Rugrats Thanksgiving"	Rick Bugental & Jim Duffy	Story by : Lane Raichert, J. David Stem & David N. Weiss; Teleplay by : Mark Palmer; Additional Material by : David Maples	November 10, 1998 (Note: The episode was released on the A Rugrats Thanksgiving VHS on October 21, 1997.)	072	5.16 3.45 (HH)
The babies try to defend a live turkey that Grandpa wins from being Thanksgiving dinner; Stu and Drew try to watch football, Didi and the ladies try to find food for dinner; and Angelica wants to hold a parade.

=== Season 6 (1999–2001) ===
In the United States, episodes 127 to 130 were held over from this season and ended up airing during Season 7.

Rugrats season 6 episodes
No. overall	No. in season	Title	Directed by	Written by	Original release date	Prod. code	Viewers (millions)
95	1	"Chuckie's Duckling"	Rick Bugental	Barbara Herndon & Jill Gorey	January 18, 1999	092	7.96 4.77 (HH)
95	1	"A Dog's Life"	John Holmquist	Melody Fox	January 18, 1999	092	7.96 4.77 (HH)
Chuckie takes in a duck that fled from a construction site, but caring for the new pet soon becomes difficult. Spike attempts to protect Dil from imminent danger, but he gets in trouble with Stu and Didi.
96	2	"Chuckerfly"	Jim Duffy	Story by : Kate Boutilier, Jon Cooksey & Ali Marie Matheson; Teleplay by : Kate Boutilier	January 23, 1999	093	2.75(HH)
96	2	"Angelica's Twin"	Jeff Scott	Rick Gitelson	January 23, 1999	093	2.75(HH)
Chuckie wants to be cute again, so he goes through his own metamorphosis. Angelica pretends she has a twin sister named Balina to get extra goodies.
97	3	"Hand Me Downs"	John Holmquist	Rick Gitelson	January 30, 1999	100	2.47 (HH)
97	3	"Angelica's Ballet"	Rick Bugental	Story by : James Peters, Barbara Herndon & Jill Gorey; Teleplay by : Kate Boutilier	January 30, 1999	100	2.47 (HH)
Angelica tells Tommy that he will disappear after Dil gets his old toys. Angelica puts on a ballet (with the help of the Rugrats) in an attempt to impress Susie.
98	4	"Raising Dil"	Rick Bugental	Kate Boutilier	February 6, 1999	094	2.76 (HH)
98	4	"No Naps"	John Holmquist	Story by : Jordana Arkin & Rick Gitelson; Teleplay by : Rick Gitelson	February 6, 1999	094	2.76 (HH)
Tommy and the babies try to educate Dil, who they believe is not as smart as they are. The babies try to avoid naptime to get a toy from Angelica.
99	5	"Man of the House"	Jim Duffy	Story by : Vinny Montello, Steve Ochs, Barbara Herndon & Jill Gorey; Teleplay by : Barbara Herndon & Jill Gorey	February 13, 1999	095	2.07 (HH)
99	5	"A Whole New Stu"	Jeff Scott	Story by : Rick Gitelson; Teleplay by : Monica Piper	February 13, 1999	095	2.07 (HH)
Tommy tries to run the household while Stu is out of town on a business trip. Stu undergoes a makeover at a health spa after suffering from so much stress.
100	6	"Submarine"	Rick Bugental	Story by : Rick Gitelson, Jon Cooksey & Ali Marie Matheson; Teleplay by : Jon Cooksey & Ali Marie Matheson	February 20, 1999	096	2.69 (HH)
100	6	"Chuckie's a Lefty"	John Holmquist	Story by : Jon Cooksey, Ali Marie Matheson, Barbara Herndon & Jill Gorey; Teleplay by : Kate Boutilier	February 20, 1999	096	2.69 (HH)
While Stu shops for a used car, Tommy, Chuckie and Dil imagine the test automobile is a submarine. Chuckie learns he is left-handed, and Angelica makes him feel like a freak.
101	7	"Baking Dil"	Jim Duffy	Story by : Barbara Herndon & Jill Gorey; Teleplay by : Ben Siegler	February 27, 1999	097	3.73 2.46 (HH)
101	7	"Hair!"	Jeff Scott	Story by : Jon Cooksey, Ali Marie Matheson, Barbara Herndon & Jill Gorey; Teleplay by : Monica Piper	February 27, 1999	097	3.73 2.46 (HH)
Dil gets lost at the bakery, where a cake is being picked up for Didi's birthday. Tommy is under the false impression that not growing hair will keep him young forever.
102	8	"Pedal Pusher"	John Holmquist	Story by : Rick Gitelson; Teleplay by : Roger Reitzel	March 6, 1999	104	3.05 (HH)
102	8	"Music"	Rick Bugental	Rick Gitelson	March 6, 1999	104	3.05 (HH)
Chuckie gets a new toy car that wins him popularity from other children at the park. The babies try to teach Dil about music and they sing their favorite tunes.
103	9	"Opposites Attract"	Jeff Scott	Story by : Rick Gitelson; Teleplay by : Monica Piper	March 13, 1999	101	4.33 2.62 (HH)
103	9	"The Art Museum"	Jim Duffy	Anne Baker	March 13, 1999	101	4.33 2.62 (HH)
The babies Tommy and Chuckie meet other babies who are just like each of them at the park but more extreme, a masculine girl and a sensitive boy. The babies see themselves in various works of art at the museum.
104	10	"The Jungle"	John Holmquist	Story by : Monica Piper, Barbara Herndon & Jill Gorey; Teleplay by : Roger Reitzel	March 20, 1999	102	N/A
104	10	"The Old Country"	Rick Bugental	Monica Piper	March 20, 1999	102	N/A
The babies visit a flower shop where they think Dil is infected with "jungle beaver", a mispronunciation of jungle fever. The babies visit Boris and Minka in the country and fear that a stampede of elephants are threatening to break down the cabin and stomp on them.
105	11	"Ghost Story"	Jeff Scott	Story by : James Peters, Barbara Herndon & Jill Gorey; Teleplay by : Barbara Herndon & Jill Gorey	March 27, 1999	103	5.52 3.36 (HH)
105	11	"Chuckie's Complaint"	Jim Duffy	Story by : Barbara Herndon & Jill Gorey; Teleplay by : Kate Boutilier	March 27, 1999	103	5.52 3.36 (HH)
The babies get involved in a ghost story with characters from Aaahh!!! Real Monsters. Chuckie becomes afraid after Angelica sends Reptar an angry letter, which she partially wrote and signed Chuckie's name on it.
106	12	"Chuckie's Bachelor Pad"	Barry Vodos	Barbara Herndon & Jill Gorey	April 10, 1999	105	2.24 (HH)
106	12	"Junior Prom"	Jeff Scott	Story by : Jon Cooksey, Ali Marie Matheson, Barbara Herndon & Jill Gorey; Teleplay by : Kate Boutilier	April 10, 1999	105	2.24 (HH)
Chuckie, after seeing boxes in his room, moves into the granny flat in his backyard while his room is being remodeled. After Susie shows an old yearbook photo of her parents at prom, the babies hold their own prom.
107	13	"What's Your Line?"	Barry Vodos	Barbara Herndon & Jill Gorey	April 17, 1999	107	2.27 (HH)
107	13	"Two by Two"	Jim Duffy	Story by : Barbara Herndon, Jill Gorey & Stephanie McClain; Teleplay by : Kate Boutilier	April 17, 1999	107	2.27 (HH)
Chuckie looks at some careers, including an ice cream man and a librarian. After hearing the story of Noah's Ark, The babies try to build an ark after fearing a huge flood.
108	14	"Wrestling Grandpa"	Jeff Scott	Barbara Herndon & Jill Gorey	May 1, 1999	109	N/A
108	14	"Chuckie Collects"	Rick Bugental	Story by : Rick Gitelson, Barbara Herndon & Jill Gorey; Teleplay by : Melody Fox	May 1, 1999	109	N/A
Grandpa Lou competes in a wrestling match. Chuckie starts a new rock collection that the Rugrats try to improve for him.
109	15	"Zoo Story"	John Holmquist	Story by : Randi Gitelson; Teleplay by : Rick Gitelson	August 7, 1999	098	N/A
109	15	"I Do"	Rick Bugental	Barbara Herndon & Jill Gorey	August 7, 1999	098	N/A
The babies go to the zoo, get trapped inside the pen, and end up accidentally freeing the animals when attempting to leave. Angelica forces Chuckie and Lil to get married after attending a wedding. They afterwards pretend Dil is their baby.
110	16	"Silent Angelica"	John Holmquist	Story by : Scott Gray & Ben Siegler; Teleplay by : Ben Siegler	August 7, 1999	106	2.27 (HH)
110	16	"Tie My Shoes"	Rick Bugental	Story by : Jon Cooksey, Ali Marie Matheson, Barbara Herndon, Jill Gorey & Scott Gray; Teleplay by : Scott Gray	August 7, 1999	106	2.27 (HH)
Angelica tries to remain quiet to receive toys from her parents. Angelica ties Chuckie's shoes, and Chuckie gets the credit.
111	17	"No Place Like Home"	Becky Bristow	Barbara Herndon & Jill Gorey	October 2, 1999	122	2.22 (HH)
Susie imagines she is in a world similar to The Wizard of Oz while she is under anesthesia while her tonsils are removed.
112	18	"Share and Share a Spike"	Rick Bugental	Written by : Monica Piper; Idea by : Jake Piper	October 2, 1999	112	3.66 2.42 (HH)
112	18	"Tommy for Mayor"	Jim Duffy	Story by : Barbara Herndon, Jill Gorey & Rick Gitelson; Teleplay by : Rick Gitelson	October 2, 1999	112	3.66 2.42 (HH)
Dil and Tommy must share Spike. The babies hold their own election between Tommy and Phil.
113	19	"Brothers are Monsters"	Jeff Scott	Barbara Herndon & Jill Gorey	October 9, 1999	113	N/A
113	19	"Cooking with Susie"	John Holmquist	Jon Cooksey & Ali Matheson	October 9, 1999	113	N/A
Tommy thinks he is turning into a monster after getting covered in dog hair. Susie gets a toy oven, but she cooks horribly; meanwhile, Stu tries out doorstoppers.
114	20	"Officer Chuckie"	Jim Duffy	Scott Gray	October 16, 1999	114	N/A
114	20	"Auctioning Grandpa"	Rick Bugental	Scott Gray	October 16, 1999	114	N/A
Chuckie studies street safety from a police officer. The babies think Grandpa will be sold.
115	21	"Planting Dil"	Rick Bugental	Story by : Barbara Herndon, Jill Gorey & Bob Daily; Teleplay by : Bob Daily	October 16, 1999	116	N/A
115	21	"Joke's on You"	Jim Duffy	Story by : Barbara Herndon, Jill Gorey & Bob Daily; Teleplay by : David Regal	October 23, 1999	116	N/A
Didi is planting dill plants, which the babies think is baby Dil and attempt to keep the plants from growing. Angelica tries to frame Dil for various pranks she played on the babies.
116	22	"Partners in Crime"	Jeff Scott	Monica Piper	November 6, 1999	115	N/A
116	22	"Thumbs Up"	John Holmquist	Adam Beechen	November 13, 1999	115	N/A
Angelica makes Dil her "partner in crime" after watching a crime film. Tommy tries to stop the other babies from thumb-sucking, fearing that they will stay babies forever if they continue to do so.
117	23	"Big Showdown"	Steve Ressel	Story by : Barbara Herndon, Jill Gorey & Peter Egan; Teleplay by : Scott Gray	November 20, 1999	117	N/A
117	23	"Doctor Susie"	Jeff Scott	Scott Gray	December 4, 1999	117	N/A
Didi completely re-models Tommy and Dil's room, against their will. Susie learns how to fix broken toys, but Angelica becomes jealous of the attention Susie gets.
118	24	"Runaway Reptar"	John Holmquist & Jim Duffy	Written by: Ali Marie Matheson & Jon Cooksey; Idea by: Scott Gray	November 27, 1999 (Note: The episode was released on the Runaway Reptar VHS on August 3, 1999.)	110–111 (995)	2.17 (HH)
119	25	"Runaway Reptar"	John Holmquist & Jim Duffy	Written by: Ali Marie Matheson & Jon Cooksey; Idea by: Scott Gray	November 27, 1999	110–111 (995)	2.17 (HH)
The babies pretend they get sucked into an evil Robot Reptar movie, in which they must find Reptar and stop Angelica's evil Reptar.
120	26	"Accidents Happen"	John Holmquist & Dave Fontana	Monica Piper	December 18, 1999	118	N/A
120	26	"Pee Wee Scouts"	Rick Bugental	Story by : Barbara Herndon & Jill Gorey; Teleplay by : John Fitzpatrick	January 8, 2000	118	N/A
Chuckie accidentally wets the bed during a dream, so Chas puts him in "training pants". That night, the babies try to keep Chuckie from falling asleep so that he will not forget about waking up to go to the bathroom. After seeing Stu's old home movie of his scout days, The babies form a scout troop.
121	27	"Chuckie's New Shirt"	Jeff Scott	Story by : Barbara Herndon, Jill Gorey & Stephanie McClain; Teleplay by : Bob Daily	January 22, 2000	119	N/A
121	27	"Cavebabies"	Steve Ressel	Rick Gitelson	January 29, 2000	119	3.64 2.53 (HH)
Chuckie destroys his shirt and, since he cannot find a perfect replacement, he fears for his identity. The babies try to get to the cookie jar for Angelica in a prehistoric era.
122	28	"Be My Valentine"	Carol Millican & Mark Risley	Written by : Barbara Herndon, Jill Gorey & Eleah Horwitz; Story by : Barbara Herndon & Jill Gorey	February 14, 2000 (Note: This episode was first released on the I Think I Like You VHS on January 11, 2000.)	123	4.00 2.49 (HH)
Chuckie tries to give a Valentine card to his dad.
123	29	"Discover America"	Sylvia Keulen	Story by : Barbara Herndon, Jill Gorey, Adam Beechen & Kate Boutilier; Teleplay by : Kate Boutilier	October 9, 2000	124	3.56
The babies go on an imaginary tour of America when Angelica and Susie cause some damage at a picnic.
124	30	"Acorn Nuts & Diapey Butts Part 1: Diaper Change" "Prequel Part 1"	Louie del Carmen	Jill Gorey & Barbara Herndon	November 7, 2000	125	N/A
125	31	"Acorn Nuts & Diapey Butts Part 2: Fall Stinks" "Prequel Part 2"	Chris Hermans	Story by : Jill Gorey & Barbara Herndon; Teleplay by : Scott Gray	November 8, 2000	126	N/A
126	32	"Acorn Nuts & Diapey Butts Part 3: Don't Poop on My Parade" "Prequel Part 3"	Jim Duffy	Story by : Jill Gorey & Barbara Herndon; Teleplay by : Peter Egan	November 9, 2000	127	N/A
127	33	"The Magic Baby"	Jim Duffy	Story by : Barbara Herndon & Jill Gorey; Teleplay by : Scott Gray	May 4, 2001 (Note: The segment "Dil We Meet Again" was first released on the Make Room For Dil VHS on October 5, 1999.)	099	1.43 (HH)
127	33	"Dil We Meet Again"	Jeff Scott	Barbara Herndon & Jill Gorey	May 4, 2001	099	1.43 (HH)
In an attempt to get Tommy's toy pony, Angelica trades the babies "magic beans", which Dil eats. The babies think that Dil has turned into a watermelon. In reality, however, Didi took Dil inside to clean him and change his diaper.
128	34	"All's Well That Pretends Well"	Rick Bugental	Story by : Barbara Herndon, Jill Gorey & Scott Gray; Teleplay by : Scott Gray	July 6, 2001	108	N/A
128	34	"Big Babies"	Jeff Scott	Ben Siegler	July 6, 2001	108	N/A
Angelica is starting to show symptoms of a cold, but wants to attend a Dummy Bears' show. To keep from being unable to go, she tries to convince the grown-ups that the babies are sick instead of her. The babies perform an initiation ceremony for Dil so he can join a club. Meanwhile, the gentlemen make a bet to imitate their babies.
129	35	"Incredible Shrinking Babies"	Sylvia Keulen	Story by : Barbara Herndon, Jill Gorey & Peter Egan; Teleplay by : Peter Egan	July 13, 2001	120	N/A
129	35	"Miss Manners"	Carol Millican	Story by : Barbara Herndon & Jill Gorey; Teleplay by : Alice Miller	July 13, 2001	120	N/A
The babies dream that they are smaller than they already are, and that Dil is a giant. They try to get him to take his nap, which proves difficult. After graduating from charm school, Angelica teaches the babies manners in order to attend a business dinner for Charlotte's boss.
130	36	"A Dose of Dil"	Carol Millican	Eleah Horwitz	July 20, 2001	121	N/A
130	36	"Famous Babies"	Cathy Malkasian	Keythe Farley & Brian Flemming	July 20, 2001	121	N/A
Dil gets a booster shot and is crying nonstop, which takes the attention away from the babies, so they copy off Angelica's technique of pretending to be sick or hurt. The babies want to be famous, so they start a rock band.

=== Season 7 (2001) ===
During season 7, Rugrats made a change with a different format that consisted of three segments per episode. Additionally, all half-hour stories from this point on had two ad breaks instead of one.

Rugrats season 7 episodes
No. overall	No. in season	Title	Directed by	Written by	Original release date	Prod. code	Viewers (millions)
131	1	"Finsterella"	Jeff Scott	Jill Gorey & Barbara Herndon	January 15, 2001	131	5.63 3.48(HH)
Chuckie thinks that his life parallels that of Cinderella after hearing of the story and Angelica drawing the parallels. When he hears about a party that all the babies seem to know about (and Kimi having a new outfit for the occasion), Chuckie becomes sad thinking he was not invited, having a dream in which he is Finsterella, Angelica and Kimi are his "evil step-ed sisters", Tommy is his fairy bob brother, and Phil and Lil are Hansel and Gretel. The party turns out to be an adoption party, in which Chas and Kira adopt each other's babies as their own- they just forgot to tell Chuckie.
132	2	"Angelicon"	Jeff Scott	Eleah Horwitz	January 19, 2001	128	4.49 2.64 (HH)
132	2	"Dil's Binkie"	Jeff Scott	David Regal	January 19, 2001	128	4.49 2.64 (HH)
132	2	"Big Brother Chuckie"	Dave Fontana	David Regal	January 19, 2001	128	4.49 2.64 (HH)
Angelica is a giant from the eyes of the babies in their new treehouse. Dil's pacifier gets tossed all over town. Chuckie, realizing that he is Kimi's big brother, tries to protect her from danger.
133	3	"Sister Act"	Rick Bugental	David Rosenberg	January 26, 2001	130	3.83 2.48 (HH)
133	3	"Spike's Nightscare"	Chris Hermans	David Rosenberg	January 26, 2001	130	3.83 2.48 (HH)
133	3	"Cuddle Bunny"	Chris Hermans	Sarah Jane Cunningham & Suzie Villandry	January 26, 2001	130	3.83 2.48 (HH)
Angelica becomes lonely and jealous after watching all the babies play with their respective siblings (Tommy/Dil, Phil/Lil, Chuckie/Kimi.) When demanding her parents give her a baby sibling does not work, she enlists some of the babies to become her siblings for the day. Spike has a nightmare. Kimi falls for a piñata at a party and doesn't want the guests to break it.
134	4	"Changes for Chuckie"	Chris Hermans	Sarah Jane Cunningham & Suzie Villandry	February 2, 2001	134	4.13 2.60 (HH)
134	4	"The Magic Show"	Bob Fuentes III	David Regal	February 2, 2001	134	4.13 2.60 (HH)
134	4	"A Lulu of a Time"	Bob Fuentes III	David Rosenberg	February 2, 2001	134	4.13 2.60 (HH)
Chuckie goes through adjustments with his new step-mom, Kira. Kira ends up taking WaWa, Chuckie's prized teddy bear (made by his mother) to clean him up and fix him, which upsets Chuckie greatly. Kira apologizes to Chuckie for all of the changes and returns WaWa to him, who fell into the hands of Dil and returned to its worn out look. The babies visit a magic show. The babies see the retirement home with Lulu and cause predictable havoc.
135	5	"Dayscare"	Anthony Bell	Story by : Sarah Jane Cunningham, Suzie Villandry & Scott Gray; Teleplay by : Scott Gray	February 9, 2001	133	4.02 2.35 (HH)
135	5	"The Great Unknown"	Louie del Carmen	David Regal	February 9, 2001	133	4.02 2.35 (HH)
135	5	"Wash-Dry Story"	Dave Fontana	David Regal	February 9, 2001	133	4.02 2.35 (HH)
Chuckie and Kimi go to daycare. Tommy finds something weird on the stairs. In this musical episode, the babies and Jonathan go to the laundromat to take care of some laundry. Angelica, who is staying home with her mother, accidentally loses Cynthia in the laundry basket. The doll ends up falling into the hands of the youngest McNulty child, who falls in love with her. The babies then fight the brothers for Cynthia and the right to play at the laundromat.
136	6	"Cat Got Your Tongue?"	Dave Fontana	Story by : Sarah Jane Cunningham & Suzie Villandry	February 16, 2001	135	2.12 (HH)
136	6	"The War Room"	Jeff Scott	Joan Considine Johnson	February 16, 2001	135	2.12 (HH)
136	6	"Attention Please"	Jeff Scott	Joan Considine Johnson	February 16, 2001	135	2.12 (HH)
Howard loses his voice, and the babies think Fluffy stole his tongue. Tommy tries to find Dil's bottle in a reception office. Kimi gets more attention than Chuckie, making him jealous.
137	7	"And the Winner Is..."	Anthony Bell	Joan Considine Johnson	March 9, 2001	136	N/A
137	7	"Dil's Bathtime"	Louie del Carmen & Jim Duffy	David Rosenberg	March 9, 2001	136	N/A
137	7	"Bigger Than Life"	Jim Duffy	David Rosenberg	March 9, 2001	136	N/A
Angelica and Susie compete in a talent contest, as do Grandpa and Lulu. A clapping meter helps decide the winner based on the crowd's applause. Angelica sabotages Susie's performance by stealing her dancing shoes, causing the girl to slip and fall around the stage. The audience loves her performance, and Susie ends up winning. Dil takes a bath with Tommy and fears the worst. The babies have "big" adventures.
138	8	"My Fair Babies"	Jeff Scott	Scott Gray	March 30, 2001	138	3.60 2.40 (HH)
138	8	"The Way Things Work"	Dave Fontana	David Regal	March 30, 2001	138	3.60 2.40 (HH)
138	8	"Home Sweet Home"	Dave Fontana	Story by : Scott Malchus; Teleplay by : John E. Fitzpatrick	March 30, 2001	138	3.60 2.40 (HH)
The babies attend a "lunch party" and must act formal. Tommy shows Dil how things work, such as the fridge and the toilet. Chuckie believes Kimi is going to be mailed back to Japan, so he tries to stop her from leaving.
139	9	"Day of the Potty"	Bob Fuentes III	David Regal	April 6, 2001	137	N/A
139	9	"Tell-Tale Cell Phone"	Chris Hermans	Sarah Jane Cunningham & Suzie Villandry	April 6, 2001	137	N/A
139	9	"The Time of Their Lives"	Chris Hermans	Joan Considine Johnson	April 6, 2001	137	N/A
Chuckie breaks his home's toilet, and the Rugrats take a trip to the appliance store with Chas and Kira to get a new one. Angelica believes she broke Charlotte's phone and hides it. But not before causing chaos by accidentally calling the police and listing herself as "extreme emergency." She ends up tearfully giving Charlotte the "broken" phone, to which Charlotte assures her its not broken, as the antenna on it breaks all the time. Angelica gets a watch.
140	10	"Dil Saver"	Louie del Carmen	Alice Miller	April 13, 2001	129	N/A
140	10	"Cooking with Phil & Lil"	Bob Fuentes III	Sarah Jane Cunningham & Suzie Villandry	April 13, 2001	129	N/A
140	10	"Piece of Cake"	Bob Fuentes III	Sarah Jane Cunningham & Suzie Villandry	April 13, 2001	129	N/A
Stu makes a Dil screen-saver, and Angelica tricks the babies into thinking that Dil is trapped in the computer. Phil and Lil make a pie their style. Angelica has a dream where she is powerful after eating cake.
141	11	"Bad Shoes"	Bob Fuentes III	David Regal	April 20, 2001	132	N/A
141	11	"The World According to Dil and Spike"	Dave Fontana	Sarah Jane Cunningham & Suzie Villandry	April 20, 2001	132	N/A
141	11	"Falling Stars"	Louie del Carmen	David Rosenberg	April 20, 2001	132	N/A
Stu has to wear uncomfortable shoes. Dil and Spike's perspectives on the world are shown. The babies wish on shooting stars and fear they are falling down.
142	12	"Adventure Squad"	Chris Hermans	Story by : Joan Considine Johnson; Teleplay by : Elin Hampton	April 27, 2001	139	1.75 (HH)
142	12	"The Way More Things Work"	Jeff Scott	David Regal	April 27, 2001	139	1.75 (HH)
142	12	"Talk of the Town"	Jeff Scott	Story by : Scott Gray; Teleplay by : David Rosenberg	April 27, 2001	139	1.75 (HH)
The Rugrats play a game of adventure squad. A follow-up from "The Way Things Work," Tommy explains more things to Dil. Angelica hosts a talk show.
143	13	"All Growed Up"	Louie del Carmen & Jim Duffy	Kate Boutilier & Eryk Casemiro	July 21, 2001	141–142 (993)	11.91 5.89 (HH)
144	14	"All Growed Up"	Louie del Carmen & Jim Duffy	Kate Boutilier & Eryk Casemiro	July 21, 2001	141–142 (993)	11.91 5.89 (HH)
The Rugrats are now ten years older, and in school, where they attend a concert.
145	15	"A Rugrats Kwanzaa"	Anthony Bell	Lisa D. Hall, Jill Gorey & Barbara Herndon	December 11, 2001 (Note: The episode was released on the Rugrats Kwanzaa VHS on September 25, 2001.)	140	2.31 (HH)
Susie's great-aunt T visits and teaches Susie and the babies about Kwanzaa.

=== Season 8 (2002–04) ===
The original two-segment format for Rugrats was brought back in season 8. However, the half-hour episodes retain having two commercial breaks.

Rugrats season 8 episodes
No. overall	No. in season	Title	Directed by	Written by	Original release date	Prod. code	Viewers (millions)
146	1	"Pre-School Daze"	Carol Millican	John E. Fitzpatrick, Jill Gorey & Barbara Herndon	April 10, 2004	143	1.69 (2–11) (Note: (2–11) denotes the amount of children aged 2 through 11 who watched the episode when it premiered.)
Angelica, Susie and Harold go to preschool.
147	2	"Curse of the Werewuff"	Joseph Scott	Peter Egan	October 28, 2002 (Note: The episode was released on the Rugrats Halloween VHS on August 27, 2002.)	144	N/A
Angelica tells the babies they will become their costumes at Halloween's end, and the only way to keep that from happening is to give her their candy.
148	3	"Bow Wow Wedding Vows"	Dean Criswell	Scott Gray	March 25, 2002 (Note: The episode was released on the Rugrats Easter VHS on February 5, 2002.)	145	4.34 2.62 (HH)
Tommy fears Spike has no more time for him on Easter. Meanwhile, Kira and Chas celebrate their first Easter.
149	4	"Quiet Please"	Anthony Bell	Rick Gitelson	February 9, 2002	146	2.34 (HH)
149	4	"Early Retirement"	Ron Noble	Scott Gray	February 9, 2002	146	2.34 (HH)
Chuckie loses his first library card and Chas deals with a book fine. Angelica asks the babies to be quiet and "retire" so she can try to watch her favorite show in peace. However, the babies' attempts at doing things retired people do still result in disrupting the show.
150	5	"The Doctor is In"	Anthony Bell	Scott Howard Leva	February 9, 2002	147	3.99 2.66 (HH)
150	5	"The Big Sneeze"	Ron Noble	Mary Williams-Villano	February 9, 2002	147	3.99 2.66 (HH)
Angelica pretends to be a doctor on the radio after hearing Didi and Betty listen to a doctor on the radio who helps people with their problems. Chuckie thinks he is allergic to Kimi because he sneezes frequently, both when interacting with her and whenever she passes by him. The Rugrats believe this, so they try several ways to get him not to sneeze when he is close to her. When nothing seems to work as planned, the Rugrats believe that he genuinely is allergic to her. The actual cause, however, is revealed later: Kimi was having a dandelion in her pocket.
151	6	"The Fun Way Day"	Dave Fontana	Barbara Schwartz	February 23, 2002	148	3.87 2.46 (HH)
151	6	"The Age of Aquarium"	Chris Hermans	Written by : David Rosenberg & Scott Gray; Story by : Scott Gray	February 23, 2002	148	3.87 2.46 (HH)
Kira and Chas hire a guy to help boost Java Lava's popularity, but this unknowingly leads to a game of Hide and Seek. The babies visit a boat-shaped aquarium and think the boat is sinking.
152	7	"Daddy's Little Helpers"	Broni Likomanov	Written by : Barbara Schwartz; Story by : Monica Piper & Scott Gray	March 9, 2002	149	2.38 (HH)
152	7	"Hello Dilly"	Michael Mullen	Monica Piper	March 9, 2002	149	2.38 (HH)
The babies help their fathers. The babies believe that Dil has turned into a doll. Note: This episode parodies the musical Hello, Dolly!
153	8	"Cynthia Comes Alive"	Carol Millican	Barbara Schwartz	April 6, 2002	150	2.36 (HH)
153	8	"Trading Phil"	Jeff Scott	Noah Taft	April 6, 2002	150	2.36 (HH)
The babies mistake a teenager for a real-life version of Angelica's doll while it is being repaired. Angelica trades Phil so a group of older children can play with him.
154	9	"Murmur on the Ornery Express"	Chris Hermans	Written by : David Regal; Story by : David Rosenberg & David Regal	November 11, 2003 (Note: The episode was released on the Rugrats Mysteries VHS/DVD on January 28, 2003.)	151	1.98 (2–11)
Strange things happen during a train ride to "Little Biendeltown", where Chuckie and Angelica's dolls vanish, as well as Minka's necklace. The Rugrats believe that there is a bandit on the train, so they try to catch him.
155	10	"Back to School"	Michael Mullen	Rick Gitelson	September 13, 2003	152	N/A
155	10	"Sweet Dreams"	Dave Fontana	Written by : Nan Friedman & Ronda Spinak; Story by : Nan Friedman, Ronda Spinak, Scott Gray & Monica Piper	September 13, 2003	152	N/A
Didi enrolls in college. Chuckie does not have a dream as the other Rugrats do.
156	11	"A Step at a Time"	Broni Likomanov	Mark Palmer; Based on an idea by: Alex Dilts & Sam Williams	September 27, 2003	153	1.78 (2–11)
156	11	"Angelica's Assistant"	Jeff Scott	Written by : Scott Gray; Story by : Rick Gitelson, Scott Gray & Monica Piper	September 27, 2003	153	1.78 (2–11)
Stu thinks Dil is walking after the babies manipulate him. Harold visits Angelica's house and Angelica must maintain calmness.
157	12	"A Tale of Two Puppies"	Michael Mullen	Rick Gitelson	June 1, 2002	154	2.55 (HH)
157	12	"Okey-Dokey Jones and the Ring of the Sunbeams"	Carol Millican	Rick Gitelson, Scott Gray, Alice Miller & Monica Piper	June 1, 2002	154	2.55 (HH)
The adults try to find buyers for Spike's two last puppies. The babies seek Lil's ring in a pet store. Note: This episode is based on the first scene of The Rugrats Movie, which parodies the Indiana Jones series of films.
158	13	"Happy Taffy"	Dave Fontana	Scott Gray	September 21, 2002	155	2.39 (HH)
158	13	"Imagine That"	Chris Hermans	Story by : Mark Palmer, Nan Friedman & Ronda Spinak; Teleplay by : Nan Friedman & Ronda Spinak	November 16, 2002	155	2.28 (HH)
Stu and Didi hire a new babysitter for the Rugrats. Guest star: Amanda Bynes as Taffy Angelica pretends to be a spy in her game, "The Cynthia Team".

=== Season 9 (2002–04) ===
Rugrats season 9 episodes
No. overall	No. in season	Title	Directed by	Written by	Original release date	Prod. code	Viewers (millions)
159	1	"Club Fred"	Jeff Scott	Story by : Rick Gitelson, Scott Gray, & Monica Piper; Teleplay by : David Regal	September 6, 2003	156	2.00 (2–11)
The babies and their parents go on a vacation at a pirate-themed family resort, with predictably disastrous results as the babies search for a treasure and Angelica starts to use credit cards.
160	2	"The Perfect Twins"	Carol Millican	Story by : Rick Gitelson, Scott Gray, & Monica Piper; Teleplay by : Monica Piper	November 30, 2002	157	N/A
Betty's British cousins come to visit and their babies are nothing like Phil and Lil.
161	3	"Babies in Toyland"	Broni Likomanov	Story by : Mark Palmer, Monica Piper, Rick Gitelson, & Eryk Casemiro; Teleplay by : Eryk Casemiro	December 9, 2002 (Note: The episode was released on the Rugrats Christmas VHS and Nick Jr. Holiday DVD on September 24, 2002.)	158–159 (991)	N/A
162	4	"Babies in Toyland"	Broni Likomanov	Story by : Mark Palmer, Monica Piper, Rick Gitelson, & Eryk Casemiro; Teleplay by : Eryk Casemiro	December 9, 2002	158–159 (991)	N/A
The babies visit Stu's holiday village, where Angelica forces Santa (voiced by James Belushi) to quit, and the adults get stranded in Stu's Western cabin. Kira and Chas celebrate their first Christmas together. Paul Reubens voices Hermie the Elf.
163	5	"Clown Around"	Michael Mullen	Rick Gitelson	January 30, 2003	160	N/A
163	5	"The Baby Rewards"	Michael Mullen	Steve Ochs	January 30, 2003	160	N/A
The babies go to the circus. The babies have an awards show, and the awards go to all of the others (Stu, Fluffy, and almost Angelica).
164	6	"Diapies & Dragons"	Chris Hermans	Scott Gray	October 5, 2002 (Note: Each of the segments from this episode premiered at different times.)	161	2.33 (HH)
164	6	"Baby Power"	Jeff Scott	Noah Taft	October 5, 2002	161	N/A
The babies go to a video arcade. The babies fear Dil is stronger than they are.
165	7	"Bug Off"	Dave Fontana & John Holmquist	Scott Gray	September 21, 2002	162	2.39 (HH)
165	7	"The Crawl Space"	Carol Millican	Story by : Rick Gitelson; Teleplay by : Jeff Wynne	March 8, 2003	162	2.57 (HH)
The babies fear a mascot. The babies move into a crawl space.
166	8	"Starstruck"	Jeff Scott	Noah Taft	March 8, 2003	163	2.57 (HH)
166	8	"Who's Taffy?"	Chris Hermans	Peter Egan	September 28, 2002	163	2.48 (HH)
Kimi gets cast in a movie. Angelica and Taffy switch places.
167	9	"They Came from the Backyard"	Broni Likomanov	Peter Hunziker	June 10, 2004	164	N/A
167	9	"Lil's Phil of Trash"	Jim Duffy	Vera Duffy	October 5, 2002	164	2.33 (HH)
The babies fear an alien invasion. Phil picks up trash. Guest stars: Drake Bell as Dusty and Marcia Wallace as Ms. Rapple
168	10	"Mutt's in a Name"	Michael Mullen	Jeff Wynne	November 22, 2002	165	2.33 (HH)
168	10	"Hurricane Alice"	Carol Millican	Robb Lanum	August 1, 2004	165	N/A
Chas thinks of a name for a puppy. Phil and Lil think that Hurricane Alice and a visiting girl named Alice are one and the same.
169	11	"Bestest of Show"	Chris Hermans	Story by : Scott Gray; Teleplay by : Shari Hearn	November 16, 2002	166	2.28 (HH)
169	11	"Hold the Pickles"	Jeff Scott	Cynthia Riddle	September 28, 2002	166	2.48 (HH)
Tommy, Angelica, and Susie compete in a pet show. Tommy misunderstands Taffy when he hears her say she does not want pickles on her burger, thinking that she is referring to Dil when she says "I don't like dill pickles". The babies cover Dil in various things trying to make Taffy like him.
170	12	"Baby Sale"	Carol Millican	Story by : Rick Gitelson & Scott Gray; Teleplay by : Rick Gitelson	September 20, 2003	167	2.17 (HH)
170	12	"Steve"	Broni Likomanov	Tom Mason & Dan Danko	September 20, 2003	167	2.17 (HH)
Didi, Kira, and Betty go to a toddler clothing sale, where the babies think they will be sold. The babies make a snow-baby but get upset when it melts with the snow.
171	13	"The Braveliest Baby"	Jim Duffy	Scott Gray	October 11, 2003	168	N/A
171	13	"Gimme an 'A'"	Michael Mullen	Mark Valenti	October 11, 2003	168	N/A
Tommy loses his courage, which his friends attempt to recover. The babies try to find an A for Didi.
172	14	"Fountain of Youth"	Jeff Scott	Story by : Rick Gitelson & Jeff Wynne; Teleplay by : Rick Gitelson	June 10, 2004	169	N/A
172	14	"Kimi Takes the Cake"	Chris Hermans	Peter Hunziker	October 5, 2002	169	N/A
The children go to a cabin that has special memories for Drew, Stu, and Chas, and the babies fear that the fountain in the center of the lake at the lodge will rejuvenate the adults. During Kimi's birthday, the babies search for a birthday cake in a scary house where Taffy performs.

== Rugrats: Tales from the Crib (2005–06) ==
These are direct-to-DVD movies that are part of the Rugrats series.

No.	Title	Directed by	Written by	Original release date	Prod. code
S1	"Snow White"	Ron Noble, Michael Dædalus Kenny, & Andrei Svislotski	Jill Gorey & Barbara Herndon	September 27, 2005 (VHS/DVD); November 13, 2005 (TV)	989
Taffy tells the kids the tale of Snow White as the Wicked Queen (Angelica) plots to get rid of Snow White (Susie), who lives with the Seven Babies who work in their diaper factory.
S2	"Three Jacks and a Beanstalk"	Ron Noble, Michael Dædalus Kenny, Zhenia Delioussine, & Andrei Svislotski	Jill Gorey & Barbara Herndon	September 5, 2006 (DVD) (Note: A trailer for this movie (released on other Nickelodeon/Nick Jr. DVD's throughout 2006) also includes the DVD release date, which can be found on YouTube.); November 5, 2006 (TV) (Note: Newspaper listings had this movie listed as an untitled Rugrats special.)	888
Three Jacks and a Beanstalk is the Rugrats spin on a classic fairytale, combining Jack Sprat with Jack and Jill – and creating their own version of Jack and the Beanstalk in the process. The babies get some magical beans that grows into a giant beanstalk leading to a huge castle in the sky. There, a fairy (Susie) offers them a key to the castle if they get three things for the castle's occupant, Angelica, a giantess. Guest star: Mo'Nique as Aunt Moo

== Films ==
Title	Directed by	Written by	Release date
The Rugrats Movie	Igor Kovalyov & Norton Virgien	David N. Weiss & J. David Stem	November 20, 1998
Rugrats in Paris: The Movie	Stig Bergqvist & Paul Demeyer	J. David Stem, David N. Weiss, Jill Gorey, Barbara Herndon & Kate Boutilier	November 17, 2000
Rugrats Go Wild	Norton Virgien & John Eng	Kate Boutilier	June 13, 2003
