= The Grim Adventures of Billy & Mandy (video game) =

2006 fighting video game

- North American Wii cover art
- Developers: High Voltage Software; Full Fat (Game Boy Advance)
- Publisher: Midway
- Producer: Tim Shymkus
- Designer: Sean Riley
- Programmer: Mike Henry
- Artist: Rick Blanco
- Composers: Gregory Hinde; Drew Neumann
- Platforms: GameCube, PlayStation 2, Game Boy Advance, Wii
- Release: GameCube, PlayStation 2: NA: September 25, 2006; Game Boy Advance; NA: October 31, 2006; Wii; NA: November 17, 2006; AU: March 15, 2007; EU: March 16, 2007
- Genre: Fighting
- Modes: Single-player, multiplayer

The Grim Adventures of Billy & Mandy is a fighting video game published by Midway based on the Cartoon Network animated television series of the same name. It pits characters from the series against one another in 3D arena battles using various attacks, items, and environmental hazards to eliminate opponents and be the last one standing. The game was developed by High Voltage Software and released in North America on September 25, 2006, for the GameCube and PlayStation 2, and on November 17, 2006, for the Wii as a launch title. The Wii version was the only port to be distributed internationally, releasing in Europe and Australia the following March. A companion game for the Game Boy Advance, featuring sidescrolling beat 'em up gameplay, was developed by Full Fat and released on October 31, 2006.

The game received mixed reception upon release, with critics praising its presentation, faithfulness to the source material, and multiplayer, but criticizing its shallow gameplay and lack of content.

== Gameplay ==
The Grim Adventures of Billy & Mandy is a 3D arena-based fighting game, similar to other games in the same style such as Power Stone. In the game, up to four players battle in a three dimensional arena and perform light and heavy style attacks in an attempt to deplete their opponents' health and knock them out. Each of the eight levels contains elements that can affect the battle, such as enemies that will attack the players or traps that can be triggered. Most levels include multiple sub-arenas and will transition from one to the next after a short amount of time has passed, such as rising lava in an Underworld cavern forcing players to ride a giant snake to escape. Players can pick up and wield different weapons that appear, such as a halberd or a club, to do additional damage. Treasure chests will spawn that contain items, including weapons, healing items, and Mojo Balls that fill the player's Mojo Meter, which can be filled up to two levels at a time. When the Mojo Meter fills to the first level, the player can expend it to perform a Mojo Smackdown, where the character attacks an opponent with a barrage of attacks that will knock them out if it connects; if the opponent's meter is also filled, they can perform a Mojo Counterattack to interrupt the Smackdown and deplete both characters' meters. When the Mojo Meter is filled to the second level, a Mojo Meltdown can be performed, instantly knocking out all opponents. Players have a limited number of lives in each battle, losing one each time their health is depleted; when a player runs out of both lives and health, they are temporarily stunned, at which point an opponent can attack them and trigger a quick time event sequence called a "final elimination", which will eliminate them from the battle if successfully completed. If the final elimination sequence is failed, the player will escape and resume battling, though they remain vulnerable to other final elimination attempts.

Several gameplay modes are available. In Story Mode, players must complete five battles against a series of computer-controlled opponents, followed by a boss battle with the brain-eating meteor from the episode "Little Rock of Horrors". Story Mode supports both single player and cooperative two-player play. Vs. Mode allows up to four players to battle against one another, with the option to play different types of matches and customize the game's rules. Some battle types include "Bask-Eye-Ball", in which players must place an eyeball into a goal; "Crush the Horde" a battle against several waves of computer-controlled enemies; and "Skull Keeper", a Keep Away-based mode in which players attempt to hold Thromnambular's Skull for as long as possible. Mission Mode features 45 missions to complete, in which players must achieve specific objectives using predetermined characters in set scenarios. Additional characters, stages, costumes, and rule sets can be unlocked by completing missions, finishing Story Mode with each character, and fulfilling other objectives. An "Extras" menu features character profiles, information on unlocked rules and items, a gallery of unlockable concept art, and trailers for other Cartoon Network products and Warner Bros. Pictures films.

The Wii version of the game incorporates some motion controls using the Wii Remote and Nunchuk: players can perform heavy attacks by swinging the Wii Remote, as well as using its infrared pointer to point at a series of onscreen targets to execute final eliminations. Traditional controls are also supported via the GameCube controller.

=== Characters ===
The console game features 15 fully playable characters, along with five bonus "horde characters", in-game enemies given a limited playable moveset who are not usable in certain modes. Only Billy, Mandy, Grim, and Irwin are initially available; all other characters must be unlocked through gameplay.

- Billy
- Boogey
- Dracula
- Eris
- Fred Fredburger
- General Skarr
- Grim
- Hoss Delgado
- Irwin
- Jack O'Lantern
- Lord Pain
- Mandy
- Mogar
- Mutant Chicken (Note: Horde character.)
- Nergal
- Nergal Jr.
- Nergling
- Olaf the Viking
- Pumpkin
- Scary Clown

=== Game Boy Advance version ===
The Game Boy Advance version follows the same plot as the console version, but is instead a sidescrolling beat 'em up with platforming elements. Players control Billy, Mandy, and Grim as they traverse 2D stages, fight enemies, and jump over obstacles. Enemies will appear at predetermined points in stages and attack the player, all of which must be defeated to continue progressing through the stage. Defeating enemies will increase the player's Mojo Meter; when filled, the player can enter a temporary powered-up state, in which their character will be rendered invincible and able to instantly defeat any enemy they touch. Like the console version, weapons will sometimes appear which can be used to more easily defeat enemies.

The main Story Mode features a brief campaign for each character, each consisting of a handful of short stages before concluding with a boss fight: Billy battles General Skarr in Endsville, Mandy pursues Jack in the pumpkin patch, and Grim confronts Nergal in the Underworld. Only Billy's story is initially available, while Mandy and Grim must be unlocked; players must complete all three stories to see the game's ending. A mission mode is also available with several unique scenarios for players to complete. Each time the player completes a story or mission for the first time, they will earn a Mojo Ball, which are used to unlock the other story campaigns and missions. Collecting all 54 Mojo Balls unlocks a concept art gallery.

== Plot ==
Someone breaks into Grim's trunk and releases his Mojo Balls, orbs of dark magic that infect anyone who touches them with supernatural rage, causing everyone in Endsville to senselessly fight each other. Following a suspicious trail of feathers, Billy, Mandy, Grim, and Irwin travel to various locations from the series to simultaneously recover the Mojo Balls and look for clues as to who released them, defeating others infected by mojo rage along the way.

After being led back to Billy's house, the group recovers the last of the mojo from the brain-eating meteor that crashes in his backyard. The others then discover that Billy was the one who opened Grim's trunk hoping to free "Moe and Joe"; a curse Grim had put on the trunk as a failsafe measure had caused Billy to begin sprouting chicken feathers, which he had been leaving a trail of so he would not get lost. Everyone is infuriated at Billy, and Mandy breaks the fourth wall to express hope that the game includes a mode where they can all beat him up. The player is then able to control Mandy and attack Billy for the duration of the game's credits sequence.

== Development and release ==
On February 15, 2005, Midway announced a licensing deal with Cartoon Network to develop games based on three of their properties. Games to be developed under this deal included The Grim Adventures of Billy & Mandy, Ed, Edd n Eddy: The Mis-Edventures, and a Dexter's Laboratory game which was later cancelled during development. The voice cast of the TV series reprise their respective roles for the game with the exception of Jack O'Lantern, who is voiced by Maurice LaMarche in place of his original actor Wayne Knight. "Weird Al" Yankovic, who previously portrayed the Squidhat in the series, voices the in-game announcer. The game's soundtrack was composed by Gregory Hinde and Drew Neumann, the composers for the animated series, and includes two songs originally written for episodes of the show: "Darkness" by SPF 1000 ("Battle of the Bands") and "Brains!" by Voltaire ("Little Rock of Horrors").

The GameCube and PlayStation 2 versions were released in September 2006, followed by the Game Boy Advance version in October and the Wii version in November as a launch title for the system. The Wii version would be the only one released outside of the United States, releasing in Europe and Australia in March 2007. A Microsoft Windows version was initially planned, but was cancelled during development for unknown reasons. The PlayStation 2 version came packaged with a bonus DVD containing the season one episode "Little Rock of Horrors" and behind-the-scenes footage featuring series creator Maxwell Atoms and actors Greg Eagles, Richard Steven Horvitz, and Grey DeLisle.

== Reception ==
Reception

Aggregate score
Aggregator	Score			
Aggregator	GBA	GameCube	PS2	Wii
Metacritic	N/A	69/100	65/100	61/100

Review scores
Publication	Score			
Publication	GBA	GameCube	PS2	Wii
Eurogamer	N/A	N/A	N/A	4/10
GameSpot	N/A	6.6/10	6.6/10	6.6/10
GameZone	N/A	N/A	N/A	6.9/10
IGN	5/10	7.2/10	7.2/10	6.8/10
NGamer	N/A	N/A	N/A	44%
Nintendo Power	N/A	6.5/10	N/A	N/A
Nintendo World Report	N/A	6.5/10	N/A	6.5/10
Official U.S. PlayStation Magazine	N/A	N/A	3/10	N/A

The game received "mixed or average reviews" on all platforms according to the review aggregation website Metacritic. GameSpot's Greg Mueller said that while the game is fun for the "first few hours" and has "Fast-paced gameplay", the game action "gets old quickly" and has a very short story mode. IGN's Mark Bozon highlighted the presentation and appeal of the GameCube and PS2 versions. Bozon later called the Wii version "a solid game with minimal Wii advantages and a few technical limitations."
