= C. H. Greenblatt =

American animator (born 1972)

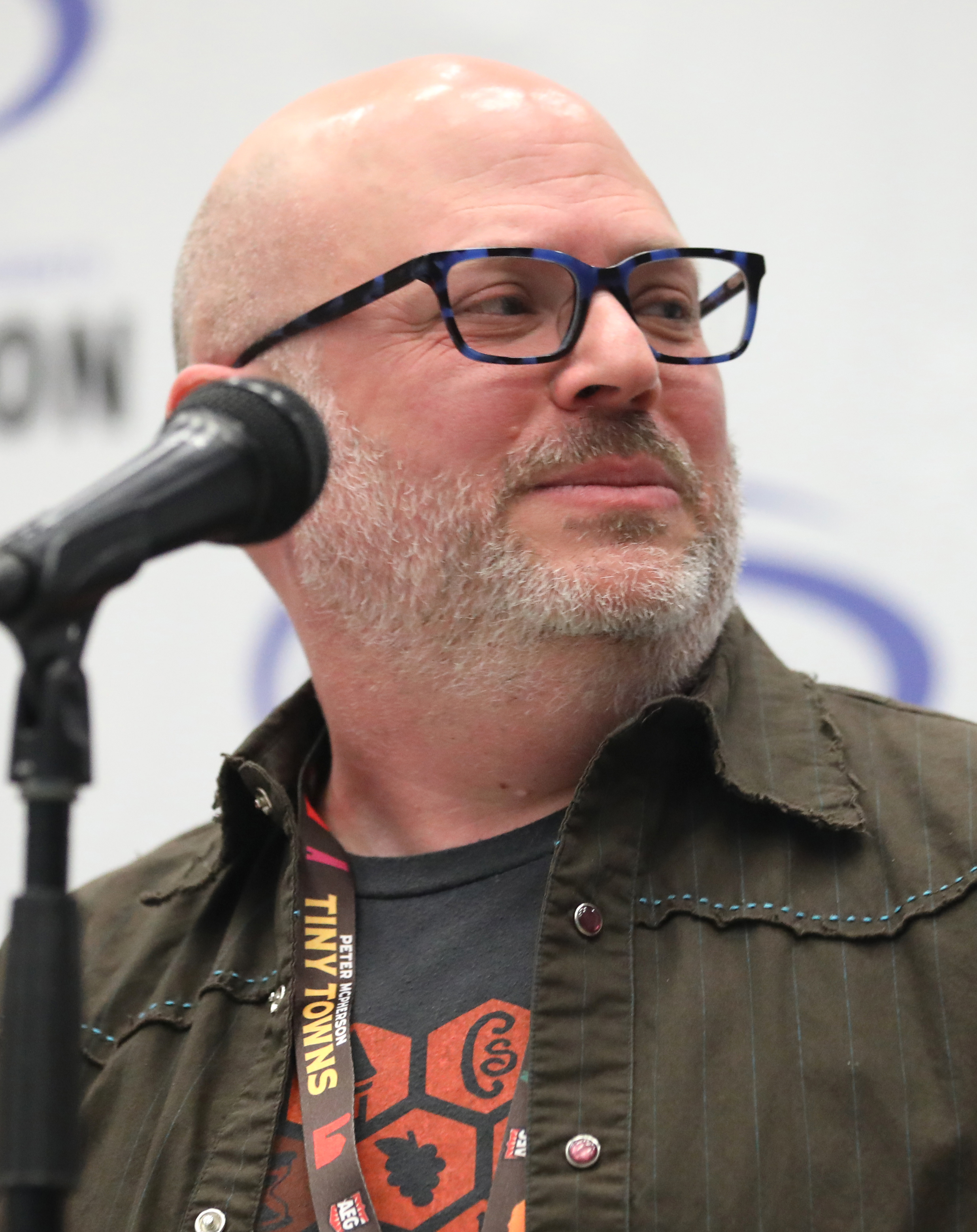
- Greenblatt at the 2024 WonderCon
- Born: Carl Harvey Greenblatt; 1972 (age 53–54); Houston, Texas, U.S.
- Education: University of Texas at Austin
- Occupations: Animator; Television writer Voice actor
- Writing career
- Years active: 1992–present
- Notable works: Chowder; SpongeBob SquarePants; The Grim Adventures of Billy & Mandy; Evil Con Carne; Harvey Beaks; Jellystone!
- Website: chgreenblatt.tumblr.com

Carl Harvey Greenblatt (born 1972), known professionally as C.H. Greenblatt, is an American animator, television writer and voice actor. He is the creator of Cartoon Network's Chowder, Nickelodeon's Harvey Beaks, and creator, developer, and executive producer of Jellystone!, an American animated series produced by Warner Bros. Animation for HBO Max based on Hanna-Barbera characters. He has also worked on Nickelodeon's SpongeBob SquarePants, Cartoon Network's The Grim Adventures of Billy & Mandy and Evil Con Carne, and Fish Hooks for Disney. His influences are reported to include the Coen Brothers, Terry Gilliam, Jim Henson, Tex Avery, Chuck Jones, Bob Clampett, Matt Groening, Stephen Hillenburg and Akira Toriyama.

== Early life ==
Greenblatt grew up in Plano, Texas. As a child, Greenblatt was a fan of cartoons and made several comics, including a comic called Zibbler. In high school, he took a commercial program that taught technical art and graphic design. He attended the University of Texas at Austin, where he majored in advertising. He worked as a cartoonist at the school's newspaper alongside Korey Coleman.

== Career ==
While studying advertising, Greenblatt sent comic strips to syndicates as well as Ad Age magazine. After graduating, Greenblatt worked as an art director on several television commercials, including Chef Boyardee's Chef Jr. campaign. He saw an ad from Nickelodeon on Animation Magazine and sent his portfolio to them. He later received a response and became a character designer. In 1998, he landed a position as an additional storyboard artist for SpongeBob SquarePants, before becoming a full-on writer and storyboard artist. From season 2 and 3 of SpongeBob he teamed up with Aaron Springer and later in season 3 he teamed up with Kaz. After finishing up on SpongeBob in 2005, Greenblatt became a storyboard artist on The Grim Adventures of Billy & Mandy right after it and sister series were both split into their own shows after being together from 2001 to 2003 in Grim & Evil.

In 2007, Greenblatt began Chowder, an animated show that he created and executive produced for Cartoon Network. Greenblatt collaborated with Maxwell Atoms on his new Billy & Mandy spin-off Halloween special called Underfist, in which he reprised his role as Fred Fredburger. He announced on his blog that Nickelodeon has given the go-ahead for an 11-minute pilot for a new show created by him entitled Bad Seeds (later renamed Harvey Beaks).

He announced in September 2013 that the show has since been picked up for 26 11-minute episodes, with production commencing at the beginning of 2014. He has also directed the Deadman shorts for DC Nation.

On April 5, 2018, Greenblatt announced that he had now been employed by Warner Bros. Animation, adding that he has been developing "something fun" for the studio but could not yet disclose anything else about it. On October 29, 2019, the project was officially unveiled under the title of Jellystone!, described as a crossover of several Hanna-Barbera characters living in the titular town "where they can't help but make trouble for one another".

Greenblatt also plays Fish Taco, one of three main characters in an animated YouTube series titled Mexiguin since 2018. He helps mentor show creator, Joe Kozdra, in animation and creative writing alongside his voice-acting contributions.

On January 29, 2021, a new Greenblatt project was registered for Disney Television Animation under the title Unnamed Pet Resort Project. In June 2026, Greenblatt revealed that the project ended up not moving forward at Disney.

In May 2026, Greenblatt revealed that in 2024, he had been asked by Cartoon Network to pitch a reboot of Chowder, titled Chowder: First Course, aimed at a younger audience, and would have involved the titular character, Panini, and Gorgonzola as students in culinary school. Unfortunately, the planned series was not greenlit, due to Cartoon Network not having enough money to afford it.

In June 2026, DC Studios announced that Greenblatt was developing "Krypto" an animated series based on Krypto the Superdog with Warner Bros Animation.

== Legacy ==
Scott Thill of Cartoon Brew praised Greenblatt as one of the most influential comedy writers with innovative comedic elements. Cartoon Brew also said Greenblatt "has logged a decade-and-a-half across studios and shows". James Poniewozik of Time credited Greenblatt as defining SpongeBob's comedic style. Greenblatt was a storyboard artist and one of the writers of the SpongeBob episode "Band Geeks", considered by many to be the best episode of the entire series. SpongeBob writer Kaz recalled writing with Greenblatt to be a fun experience and said that he was full of "weird energy".

== Filmography ==
=== Television ===
Year	Title	Role	Notes
1999–2005, 2025	SpongeBob SquarePants	Carl ("Selling Out")	assistant storyboard artist, writer, storyboard artist, storyboard director
2003	Whatever Happened to... Robot Jones?	N/A	writer, storyboard artist ("Safety Patrol" & "Popularity")
2003	Free for All	N/A	storyboard artist
2003–04	Evil Con Carne	N/A	story, storyboard artist
2004–07	The Grim Adventures of Billy & Mandy	Fred Fredburger, additional voices	story, storyboard artist
2005	The X's	N/A	storyboard artist ("Photo Ops")
2007–10	Chowder	Kimchi, Kiwi, Adult Chowder, Himself, additional voices	creator, character designer, prop designer, executive producer, story writer, songwriter, storyboard artist
2010–14	Fish Hooks	Chino	director, story, writer, storyboard artist
2012	Deadman shorts	N/A	writer, storyboard artist, director, producer, character designer, color stylist, and prop designer
2015–17	Harvey Beaks	Technobear (Pilot), Dade, Jeremy, additional voices	creator, character designer, main title designer, prop designer, executive producer, staff writer, writer, storyboard artist, voice director, director
2019; 2026	Big City Greens	Dentist, Mole, Marmot	voice actor ("Reckoning Ball", "Chicken Coup")
2021	Unnamed Pet Resort Project	N/A	creator
2021–25	Jellystone!	Boo-Boo Bear, Doggie Daddy, Peter Potamus, Benny the Ball, Yahooey, Drooper, Grape Ape, Fred Fredburger	developer, writer, character designer, director, executive producer
TBA	Untitled animated Krypto series	TBA	Developer, writer, character designer, executive producer

=== Film ===
Year	Title	Role	Notes
2007	Billy & Mandy's Big Boogey Adventure	Fred Fredburger, Pirate #4	Storyboard artist
2007	The Grim Adventures of the Kids Next Door	Fred Fredburger	N/A
2008	Underfist	Fred Fredburger	N/A
2008	Hellboy II: The Golden Army	N/A	Special thanks
2015	The SpongeBob Movie: Sponge Out of Water	N/A	Storyboard punch-up
2016	PINK: The Lighter Shade of Red	N/A	Special thanks

=== Video games ===
Year	Title	Voice role
2006	The Grim Adventures of Billy & Mandy	Fred Fredburger
2009	Cartoon Network Universe: FusionFall	Fred Fredburger, Kimchi
2011	Cartoon Network: Punch Time Explosion	Fred Fredburger

=== Internet ===
Year	Title	Role	Notes
2016	Cartoons VS Cancer	Himself	Podcast
2016	RebelTaxi; Pizza Party Podcast	Himself	Podcast
2016	Nickelodeon Animation Podcast	Himself	Podcast
2018–present	Mexiguin	Fish Taco	Voice
