= Underfist: Halloween Bash =

2008 television program directed by Shaun Cashman

- Genre: Comedy horror; Action-adventure; Slapstick
- Created by: Maxwell Atoms
- Based on: Grim & Evil by Maxwell Atoms
- Story by: Maxwell Atoms
- Directed by: Shaun Cashman
- Voices of: Diedrich Bader; Vanessa Marshall; Maxwell Atoms; C. H. Greenblatt; Armin Shimerman; Grey DeLisle; Richard Steven Horvitz; Greg Eagles; Dave Wittenberg; Rachael MacFarlane; Phil LaMarr; Greg Ellis; Dan Gilvezan; Jess Harnell; Martin Jarvis
- Theme music composer: Drew Neumann
- Ending theme: "Underfist"
- Composer: Drew Neumann
- Country of origin: United States
- Original language: English

Production
- Executive producer: Maxwell Atoms
- Editor: Illya Owens
- Running time: 61 minutes
- Production company: Cartoon Network Studios

Original release
- Network: Cartoon Network
- Release: October 12, 2008

Related
- The Grim Adventures of Billy & Mandy; Evil Con Carne; Grim & Evil

Underfist: Halloween Bash (otherwise known as Underfist) is an American animated spin-off special of The Grim Adventures of Billy & Mandy. It originally aired on Cartoon Network on October 12, 2008. The special was going to be the setup for a new series spin-off of Grim & Evil, but Maxwell Atoms's contract with Cartoon Network expired before he moved to Disney Channel for the TV series Fish Hooks, and the special was ultimately the finale of the Grim & Evil franchise.

== Plot ==
On Halloween night, Irwin, Billy, Mandy, and Grim are trick-or-treating. Billy is a witch, Mandy and Grim are the Spanish Inquisition who burn witches and vampires, and Irwin is Dracula, king of the vampires. Billy, Mandy, and Grim decide to go home after having no success with Dracula, who rudely hands them pennies. Irwin realizes that his life is passing him by. A girl, Mindy (secretly turned into a witch by an evil marshmallow bunny named Mr. Bun Bun), fools Irwin into opening an underworld portal, releasing an army of evil candy warriors who start terrorizing the neighborhood. Irwin gets attacked and contacts Hoss Delgado, who helps him with the battle. The warriors take down Hoss with soda-candy guns, which if Hoss gets sticky, he gets a rash. When they kill Skarr's winning purple pansies, he comes out of his garage with a robot, joining the battle. Soon it's an all out war, with no mercy, no rules, no nothing. Mindy again tricks Irwin, but this time, pretending she is being kidnapped by Mr. Bun Bun, taking her into the Underworld.

When the candy level gets too high, Hoss clicks his car unlock system, and a giant saw car drills out of the ground. They escape and start to plot their attack to the Underworld.

Soon they find a portal to the Underworld in the rain, which Hoss and Irwin jump in first, but the portal turns off, because Mindy destroyed the diamond powering it. The candy warriors try to sacrifice Hoss by pushing him into hot cocoa, but they want to leave Irwin alive. This is because he has the powers of a mummy, being half mummy from his mother, which they need to keep the balance of the Underworld in place, and to become stronger warriors to eat the trick-or-treaters.

Mindy creates a potion which turns all the warriors into monsters, and all she needs now is Irwin's powers to create the candy warriors ultimate monster form. But Irwin refuses. Soon Jeff the Spider, Fred Fredburger, and Skarr find out a way how to get to the Underworld by using Hoss's car to drill into the Underworld, and they rescue Irwin and Hoss.

But the army of candy monsters hasn't given up yet. They head to the city and attack. Irwin and Hoss get into an argument, leading into a battle, turning on each other. While the battle is going on, the monsters suck up Irwin's power and transform into one giant candy monster. Jeff and Fred try to escape, but they fail. Soon Hoss and Irwin see the monster and start to fight it, beating it. Irwin discovers that Hoss is scared of monsters, because he was haunted as a kid. In a rare moment of emotion, Hoss apologizes to Irwin for how he treated him and realizes there are good monsters out there. Mindy also realizes what she did was wrong and apologizes as well.

Just then, Mr. Bun Bun and Skarr (who is secretly working for him) appear, and Mr. Bun Bun admits that he was the one who turned Mindy into a witch using a Witch Worm and used her to get to Irwin so he could use his powers to open up portals to the Underworld. He also reveals that he cut off Fred's tusks, made Billy scared of spiders, and haunted Hoss's childhood. Just as Bun Bun is about to kill Mindy and Underfist, Skarr betrays Bun Bun and kicks him into hot cocoa, melting the marshmallow bunny.

Grim, Billy, and Mandy (who became president) award Underfist for saving Halloween, but then they hear something outside and investigate. It is revealed that an army of squid warriors have found their way to the surface, which the team prepare to fight.

== Characters and cast ==
- Vanessa Marshall – Irwin
- Armin Shimerman – Skarr, Candy Skeleton, Rat
- Maxwell Atoms – Jeff the Spider
- Diedrich Bader – Hoss Delgado
- C. H. Greenblatt – Fred Fredburger
- Dave Wittenberg – Mr. Bun Bun
- Rachael MacFarlane – Mindy
- Grey DeLisle – Mandy, Aunt Sis
- Greg Eagles – Grim, Sperg, Candy Bar, Pumpkin
- Richard Steven Horvitz – Billy, Harold
- Phil LaMarr – Dracula, Bougersnatch
- Martin Jarvis – Nergal

== Production ==
Maxwell Atoms started production on Underfist shortly after he finished with The Grim Adventures of Billy & Mandy. The special was finished several months before it aired, but as it was a Halloween special, it was delayed until October. Cartoon Network did not pay for a permanent crew for a single film, so much of the work was done freelance or by Atoms himself. The film also used a different overseas animation crew at Digital eMation.

The special did not become a series due to the fact that Stuart Snyder, Cartoon Network's president at the time, chose to focus on new ideas, which included live-action. This move resulted in long-time creators for the network such as Atoms, Mr. Warburton and Craig McCracken leaving the network. Atoms later claimed on his personal Tumblr in 2021 that his decision to leave the network was not voluntary, as the special resulted in his firing by Michael Ouweleen for "ruining Cartoon Network's brand" with his gross out humor.

== Reception ==
Underfist tied for first in ratings for the week it was aired and was nominated for Best Animated Television Production for Children in the 36th Annie Awards. The special won character designer Andy Suriano the Primetime Emmy Award for Outstanding Individual Achievement in Animation at the 61st Primetime Emmy Awards in 2009. Jacob Paschal of Toon Zone gave the film a negative review, saying "Overall, Underfist is your typical annual Halloween film fluff designed to fill the airwaves and get younger folk hyped on something other than candy. Maybe you'll find that enough".
