= List of Grim & Evil characters =

Billy, Mandy, and Grim, the main characters of the series.

The American animated television series Grim & Evil was created by Maxwell Atoms for Cartoon Network. It consists of two segments which were eventually spun off into their own series: The Grim Adventures of Billy & Mandy and Evil Con Carne.

The Grim Adventures of Billy & Mandy follows two children: a dimwitted yet well-meaning boy named Billy (voiced by Richard Steven Horvitz) and a brilliant yet sinister girl named Mandy (voiced by Grey DeLisle). After winning a limbo game to save Billy's pet hamster, the two gain the Grim Reaper (voiced by Greg Eagles) as their best friend for eternity and come across many supernatural or otherworldly characters and locations throughout the series.

Its sister show, Evil Con Carne, follows the brain of a playboy who wants to rule the world with his general, Skarr, and his lover, Major Doctor Ghastly. Since Hector Con Carne is attached to a bear named Boskov, Hector wants to find the rest of his body parts and take over the world.

== Introduced in The Grim Adventures of Billy & Mandy ==
=== Main ===
In 2021, Maxwell Atoms, who has Asperger syndrome himself, confirmed that Billy, Mandy and the Grim Reaper are on the autistic spectrum. He likens Billy to "the fun and joyous inner-world where [Atoms likes] to spend [his] time" in contrast to Mandy, Mandy to "the cold, rational way [he] learned to view the world in order to survive", and Grim as "the moral mediator between the two."

==== Billy ====
Billy
- First appearance: "Meet the Reaper"
- Last appearance: Underfist: Halloween Bash
- Voiced by: Richard Steven Horvitz

In-universe information
- Full name: William
- Nickname: Billy
- Gender: Male
- Occupation: Student at Endsville Elementary School
- Family: Gladys (mother), Harold (father), Aunt Sis (aunt), Nergal (uncle), Nergal Jr. (cousin), Jeff the Spider (adopted son), Mandy (future wife)
- Nationality: American

William "Billy" is a human boy with a profound intellectual disability, having been outperformed by a shovel and two candy bracelets on an IQ test, though he acts like a smart-aleck. Mandy is Billy's best friend, though she treats him more like a servant than a friend. It has been hinted several times that Billy may have underlying feelings for Mandy that he does not fully realize. Billy is far kinder to Grim than Mandy is; while he almost always goes against Grim's advice and uses him as a plaything, he appears to genuinely like him and often tells Grim that he is his "best friend".

Due to Billy's foolish desires, which he orders Grim to bring about, he is often the cause of Grim and Mandy's mishaps. Although good-natured, he has occasional fits of stubbornness and rage, which shows insanity that even Mandy seems to fear. Billy is also scared of clowns and spiders, resulting from a childhood incident where Bun-Bun snuck into his room and tormented him with spiders.

==== Mandy ====
Mandy
- First appearance: "Meet the Reaper"
- Last appearance: Underfist: Halloween Bash
- Voiced by: Grey DeLisle

In-universe information
- Full name: Amanda
- Nickname: Mandy
- Gender: Female
- Occupation: Student at Endsville Elementary; President of the United States
- Relatives: Phil (father), Claire (mother), Billy (future husband), Gladys (future mother-in-law), Harold (future father-in-law), Aunt Sis (future aunt-in-law), Nergal (future uncle-in-law), Nergal Jr. (future cousin-in-law), Jeff the Spider (future adopted son)
- Nationality: American

Amanda "Mandy" is a human girl with a sinister, manipulative nature despite her appearance. Mandy has been known to domineer everybody around her without fear, and the few things that she likes include junk food, television, and all things dark and melancholy. She also possesses a strong lust for power as revealed in an episode providing insight to the future of the town of Endsville, in which Mandy has enslaved all of its citizens and evolved herself into a large caterpillar-like creature. In Underfist: Halloween Bash, after the Underworld invades Earth, Mandy seizes power as the new President of the United States, with Grim and Billy serving as her weapons experts, the trio rewarding Underfist for saving the world.

Throughout the series, Mandy rarely smiles, and her facial expression remains perpetually disgruntled. Mandy smiling is shown to be the end of the world; in the episode "My Fair Mandy", all of reality is distorted, resulting in the series swapping premises with that of The Powerpuff Girls, another Cartoon Network animated series.

==== The Grim Reaper ====
The Grim Reaper
- First appearance: "Meet the Reaper"
- Last appearance: Underfist: Halloween Bash
- Voiced by: Greg Eagles

In-universe information
- Full name: Evergrimskull Death
- Nicknames: Grim, Grimey, Grimuel, Mr. Grim, Mr. Reaper, Bonehead, Loser, Bag of Bones, G-Man, Grimmy (when younger)
- Species: Skeleton, psychopomp
- Gender: Male
- Title(s): The Grim Reaper; The Master of Life and Death
- Occupation: The Reaper of Souls
- Relatives: Miriam (mother), Earl (father), Kali (great aunt), Granny Grim (grandmother)
- Nationality: Jamaican

Evergrimskull "Grim" Death a.k.a. the Grim Reaper is the personification of death appearing as a skeleton wearing a black, hooded cloak and armed with a scythe, who serves as a psychopomp between the realms of the living and the deceased. Grim was born around 137,000 years ago at the time of the Stone Age and speaks with a Jamaican accent. The continuity of how Grim gained his status and powers varies between episode. In the television film Wrath of the Spider Queen, Grim was elected to his position as the Grim Reaper while in middle school; in "A Grim Prophecy", it is shown that he has been the Grim Reaper since childhood. His long scythe is the source of nearly all his supernatural abilities, and possesses many magical capabilities and qualities; although he is still capable of using some incredibly powerful magic spells without it, these instances are quite rare.

After losing a limbo contest to Billy and Mandy after they cheated, Grim is fated to be their "best friend" forever. A contract legally binds him to them, such that if he were to ever break his friendship with them prematurely, he would be forced to spend eternity in a jail in the underworld as a result of violating his contract. Despite this however, he has often tried various ways to get out of this servitude. Though Billy is friendly towards him, Mandy treats him dominantly, and this angers and irritates him to the point where he constantly fantasizes about killing both of them. However, there have been instances that show that he does indeed care for them. His adaptation to daily life also leads him to neglect his duties as a Master of the Underworld and, eventually, not even care about who uses his scythe.

=== Supporting ===
==== Irwin Dracula ====
Irwin Dracula
- First appearance: "Get Out of My Head!"
- Last appearance: Underfist: Halloween Bash
- Voiced by: Vanessa Marshall

In-universe information
- Species: Dhampir-Mummy (Human-Vampire-Mummy hybrid)
- Gender: Male
- Occupation: Student at Endsville Elementary
- Relatives: King Dracula (paternal vampire grandfather); Tanya (paternal grandmother); Pharaoh Poppin Lockin (maternal mummy grandfather); Richard Dracula (dhampir father); Judy (mummy mother); Melvin (older brother)
- Nationality: American

Irwin, later Irwin Dracula, is a nerdy boy and a close friend of Billy's. Unlike Mandy and Billy, who show no signs of fear for the frightening, supernatural and magical beings and settings around them when using Grim's magic to venture into the underworld, Irwin has displayed more signs of cowardice in such situations and seems to be more easily terrified than his friends when he accompanies them on such trips. Irwin's mother and maternal grandfather are mummies, while his paternal grandfather is Dracula.

In rare instances Irwin is shown to have an evil, darker and power-hungry side to his personality. In the episode "Heartburn", Mandy discovers everyone's true heart through the use of Grim's special camera, but is greatly shocked when she discovers that one side of Irwin's heart looks like hers in a creepy way. Irwin explains that he was born evil, but had a change of heart when his father showed him the meaning of respect, friendship, and love.

==== Billy's family ====
- Harold (voiced by Richard Steven Horvitz) is Billy's equally dimwitted and idiotic father and Gladys' husband. Harold resembles his son in appearance and personality, sometimes displaying even more stupidity than Billy himself. Harold's employment is unknown and varies between episodes. Despite his low IQ, Harold was accepted in Harvard and is a former Navy Seal.
- Gladys (voiced by Jennifer Hale) is Billy's mother and Harold's wife. She is a loving, tolerant, and patient, yet mentally unstable woman. This is brought on by having to deal with her family, and Grim as a guest. She has a severe facial tic, which usually appears when Billy is misbehaving, when her authority is challenged, or whenever Grim is present, and has also developed nervous breakdowns. Despite so, Gladys cares deeply for Billy and Harold, although when Harold gets fired for doing something so stupid or whenever Billy is really disobeying her or acting up, she does have large outbursts of rage.
- Milkshakes (voiced by Grey DeLisle) is Billy's cat. In spite of his lack of significance in the series, on a couple of occasions he has played a key role; his body has been overtaken supernaturally on two occasions in the past; once by a bookworm to help Billy in school and on the other instance by an enraged, vindictive Mandy, whose body had been possessed by a clowning Billy earlier in the episode.
- Nergal (voiced by David Warner (2001–2002); Martin Jarvis (2003–2008)) is a British accented, black-skinned supernatural devil with green eyes who is the god of war and wears a business suit. He is loosely based on the Mesopotamian deity of the same name. Nergal is able to shapeshift and sprout tentacles from his back that can electrocute others or turn them into beings resembling himself. What Nergal desires most is having friends, once stating that it is quite lonely in the center of the world
- Aunt Sis (voiced by Grey DeLisle) is Harold's sister and Billy's paternal aunt. She was a spinster who had experienced four-and-a-half-minutes of love in her "pathetic, lonely life" before finally finding her match in the equally lonely demon Nergal.
- Nergal Jr. "Junior" (voiced by Debi Derryberry) is the son of Nergal and Billy's aunt Sis, and Gladys and Harold's nephew. Like his father, he has the power to shapeshift and most of the time he appears in the form of a child. It is revealed in the episode "Son of Nergal" that his true form resembles a black octopus-like creature. Like his father, Nergal Jr. is lonely and terrorizes others out of desperation.

==== Mandy's family ====
- Phillip "Phil" (voiced by Dee Bradley Baker) is Mandy's father and Claire's husband. In "Keeper of the Reaper", he states that when Mandy was born, wolves came and tried to take her as their own, but he sometimes wonders if they were right to stop them.
- Claire (voiced by Vanessa Marshall) is Mandy's mother and Phil's wife. She, like her husband, is also terrified of her daughter.
- Saliva (voiced by Jess Harnell, later Richard Horvitz) is Mandy's dog.

==== Irwin's family ====
- Richard "Dick" Dracula (voiced by Phil LaMarr) is Irwin's father. He is a middle-aged Dhampir (half-human and half-vampire), but is never referred to as a vampire and does not appear to possess any vampiric powers. He is married to a mummy named Judy, who is Irwin's mother and due to her being a mummy makes Irwin half-mummy, one quarter human and one quarter vampire. Irwin's father insists that their unusual pairing leaves "a lot of questions that don't need to be answered".
- Judith "Judy" Lockin' Dracula is Irwin's mummy mother and wife of human/vampire Richard Dracula. Since Judy is undead, she lives in the basement (resembling an Egyptian tomb).
- Tanya "Grand-mama" Dracula (voiced by Phil LaMarr) is Dick's mother, Judy's mother-in-law and Irwin's paternal grandmother. Despite her angry demeanor, she seems to care for Irwin, but will sometimes embarrass him. In "Dracula Must Die!", it is revealed that when she was young, Tanya was a very lovely young woman who could really kick-butt with karate and that she married Dracula because he was a great dancer despite him being a vampire.
- Lord Dracula (voiced by Phil LaMarr) is a legendary vampire, Irwin's paternal grandfather, and Grim's childhood hero. When he danced for Tanya she instantly fell in love with him, but he ran away from her when she beat him up, thinking he was a bat. He frequently refers to himself in the third person. Dracula's appearance and mannerisms are patterned after the blaxploitation films of the early 70's, most notably Blacula, as well as Fred G. Sanford of Sanford & Son.
- Melvin Dracula, Irwin’s older brother

==== School members ====
- Mindy (voiced by Rachael MacFarlane) is the queen bee of the school attended by all of the child characters featured in the program (and is always shown in her school clothes regardless of being outside of school). Mindy shares a rivalry with Mandy, whom she looks down upon and considers to be unattractive and inferior in comparison with her. Being very self-important, Mindy snubs her peers and has a powerful competitive edge.
- Sperg (voiced by Greg Eagles) is a bully who picks on Billy, Irwin, Pud'n, and other kids to no end. He is a husky boy whose preferred method of terrorizing other kids is by administering his lethal wedgies. Despite his physical strength, he is frightened of Mandy because of her toughness and cynical attitude. Sperg has dreams of moving to New York City and having a career on Broadway when he grows up.
- Pud'n (voiced by Jane Carr) is a weak, sensitive, and easily frightened boy who is a classmate of Billy, Mandy, and Irwin. Pud'n is often the victim or instigator of some traumatic event. Supposedly, he has no parents, but was raised by wolves. However, he lives in a house and is a next-door neighbor and a good friend of Billy. Pud'n loves dolls, bunnies and flowers.
- Ms. Eleanor Butterbean (voiced by Renee Raudman) is Billy and Mandy's uncaring teacher. She often takes naps in class on her desk and detests her job as a teacher. While she is mean to everyone, in a few episodes, she is slightly more sensitive, as one time she changes Billy's F to an A, causing the universe to turn inside out.
- Principal Goodvibes (voiced by Chris Cox) is the principal of Billy and Mandy's school. His name was legally changed to Goodvibes, and he makes sure that his students feel good to the point of absurdity. He appears to be on good terms with Mandy, being one of the few authority figures who she does not directly disrespect.

==== Underworld and supernatural ====
- Eris (voiced by Rachael MacFarlane) based on the Greek deity of the same name, is the personification of strife. She delights in causing all kinds of chaos and does a multitude of destructive things. She possesses the powerful Apple of Discord, a golden apple which can transform into any shape to perpetuate chaos. Her accent and behavior are prone to sudden shifts, from a stereotypical valley girl to a refined British woman.
- Jeff the Spider (voiced by Maxwell Atoms) is a giant anthropomorphic spider who hatched from an egg, which Billy raised without knowing what it would hatch into. As a result, Jeff believes Billy to be his father. Unfailingly friendly, caring, and kind, Jeff wants more than anything to gain Billy's fatherly love despite Billy's arachnophobia-based fear and hatred for him.
- Sir Raven (voiced by Julian Stone) is an anthropomorphic raven who appears in five episodes, reading the events of said episodes from a story book. He has a habit of randomly yelling partway through his sentences, and admits to not having much concern form anything, saying that the characters other than Billy bore him.
- The Boogeyman (voiced by Fred Willard) is the dead king of boogey men, an old arch-enemy of Grim's since junior high school and a former bully. Boogey is Grim's rival in scaring people but usually fails in doing so. Being constantly frustrated by his inability to scare modern-day children. Mandy suggests a challenge of a scaring contest, which Boogey promptly loses, and is banished to the Pit of Terror/Nightmare Realm.
- Judge Roy Spleen (voiced by Phil LaMarr) is the judge of the Underworld Court. His name is a pun on judge Roy Bean.
- Fred Fredburger (voiced by C. H. Greenblatt) is a creature with green fur, an elephant-like face, stubby horns, and a pointed tail. He is depicted as being generally idiotic, infantile, and harmless; he dwells on subjects such as facts about himself and spelling his own name aloud. Aside from this, Fred has been shown to harbor an adoration of frozen yogurt and especially nachos, and wound up overtaking the future as a powerful overlord. In "Billy & Mandy's Underfist: Halloween Bash", it was shown that Fred has become good friends with Jeff the Spider.
- Velma Green the Spider Queen (voiced by Kari Wahlgren) is a half-human half-spider creature who is the queen of the spiders as seen in "Billy & Mandy: Wrath of the Spider Queen". When her family had moved from the Spider Planet, Velma went to the same Underworld high school as Grim when they were teenagers and used to be friends with him. The school held a competition to see who could become the personification of death, and Grim won; however, Velma believes he cheated. This caused her to become vindictive and evil, and she sought to eat Grim's head as revenge while being betrothed to Jeff the Spider. She eventually discovers from Grim's memories that he wanted to ensure that Velma would win the competition, but due to his confrontation with Boogie, everyone voted for Grim instead. Realizing her mistake, she reconciles with Grim.

=== Recurring ===
==== General Skarr ====
General Skarr
- First appearance: "Evil Con Carne"
- Last appearance: Underfist: Halloween Bash
- Voiced by: Armin Shimerman

In-universe information
- Full name: Reginald Peter Skarr
- Gender: Male
- Title(s): General Skarr; Emperor Skarr
- Occupation: General of Evil Con Carne; General of Underfist
- Nationality: British

General Reginald Peter Skarr, or simply General Skarr, first appeared in the series Evil Con Carne, where he was Hector Con Carne's paramilitary commander. He heavily despises Hector's rule and wants to become ruler himself in many attempts.

After Evil Con Carne was canceled, Skarr became a recurring character in The Grim Adventures of Billy & Mandy as a neighbor who wants to go his own ways. He is usually a cold-hearted, hateful, and harsh man, with big interests in power and world domination. He speaks in a British accent, and is blind in his left eye, giving Billy the assumption that he is a pirate. Having retired due to Evil Con Carne being bought out by an entertainment corporation, he moves into Billy and Mandy's neighborhood and is constantly struggling with the temptation to return to evil.

==== Hoss Delgado ====
Hoss Delgado (voiced by Diedrich Bader) is a spectral exterminator; a hunter of paranormal creatures. He possesses one real hand and a mechanical one, the latter of which can seemingly produce any tool he desires, most commonly a metal fist or a chainsaw-launching crossbow. Delgado is known to make incredibly odd and usually completely irrelevant metaphors, often when talking to someone who is either cowardly or stupid. Similarly, he uses exclamatory phrases which are different, but recognizable from their original form.

==== Toadblatt's School ====
- Nigel Planter (voiced by Jake Thomas), a spoof of Harry Potter, is a young wizard from Weaselthorpe House at Toadblatt's School of Sorcery. He is often overconfident and holds a deluded self-image, often taking credit for things he did not do. In the episode "Nigel Planter and the Order of the Peanuts", it is revealed that Planter is the heir of a peanut company and was not meant to become a wizard.
- Dean Toadblatt (voiced primarily by John Vernon, Ronnie Schell in "Nigel Planter and the Order of the Peanuts" following Vernon's death) is the headmaster of Toadblatt's School of Sorcery, and a spoof of Albus Dumbledore. Toadblatt is a large, humanoid toad wearing a purple wizard's robe. He hates Nigel Planter with a passion, and goes to various lengths to remove him from his school.
- Lord Moldybutt (voiced by John Kassir) is a spoof of Harry Potter villain Lord Voldemort. He is first mentioned in "The Chamber Pot of Secrets", where is believed to be out to kill Nigel Planter. In the episode "Nigel Planter and the Order of the Peanuts", it is revealed that Moldybutt is a real estate attorney who intends to help Planter inherit the peanut company owned by his late parents. When Planter was young, Moldybutt gave him an L-shaped pen mark on his forehead, which Planter believed to be a scar. As a running gag, something breaks whenever his name is mentioned by other people and even by Moldybutt himself.
- Squidhat (voiced by "Weird Al" Yankovic) is a squid used by Toadblatt to allocate his new students to the school's various houses, in homage to the Sorting Hat from Harry Potter.

=== Minor ===
==== Lord Pain ====
Lord Pain (voiced by Henry Gibson) is the ruler of a realm known as the Plane of Eternal Suffering. His head is covered by a spiked helmet, obscuring his eyes; and he wields a large mace and shield. He swears eternal and single-minded loyalty to his chosen master, tattooing their image on his body along with anything else he feels particularly passionate about.

==== Cerberus ====
Cerberus (voiced by Jess Harnell, Greg Eagles and Danny Mann) is Grim's pet demon dog from the Underworld, with two heads of a doberman and one of a poodle. He however has no control of him whatsoever, which often terrifies him. But as Billy and Mandy love their pets, Grim loves him.

==== Mr. Snuggles ====
Mr. Snuggles (voiced by Richard Steven Horvitz) is Billy's elderly pet hamster. Grim intended to kill Snuggles, but was thwarted by Billy and Mandy, leading to his servitude to them.

==== Jack O'Lantern ====
Jack O'Lantern (voiced by Wayne Knight in the series; Maurice LaMarche in the video game) is the main antagonist of "Billy & Mandy's Jacked Up Halloween". A prankster from the medieval era, the people of Endsville grew tired of his pranks and framed him for a crime, for which he was executed. When Grim came to reap his soul, he managed to steal Grim's scythe, demanding immortality in exchange for it. Grim was forced to agree, but decapitated Jack in retribution as he hated being tricked, forcing him to replace it with a pumpkin and leading to his ostracization by society, only being able to come out during Halloween night where he can blend in perfectly. Since then, Jack and Grim held a powerful grudge towards each other.

==== Thromnambular ====
Thromnambular (voiced by Dwight Schultz) is a talking skull who is imprisoned on Earth and must grant nine wishes to be freed. He debuts in "Wishbones", where Billy and Mandy find him in Grim's robe. After Billy makes his wish, Thromnambular is found by various people that he grants wishes for until Grim uses his last wish to make it so that Billy and Mandy never finding Thromnambular, erasing the preceding events from existence and crushing Thromnambular's chance at freedom.

==== Wiggly Jiggly Jed ====
Wiggly Jiggly Jed (voiced by Pat Fraley) is a humanoid dog that Grim created for Billy. Although they are best friends, their relationship breaks when Billy refuses to let him sleep in his bed and tells him to sleep outside in a doghouse. Craving for a bed, Jed uses the powers of Grim's trunk to build a giant machine to capture the beds of all people, also planning to make a fortune with them. Billy ultimately kills Jed with a dish of primordial ooze that he got from Grim.

==== Trykie ====
Trykie is a tricycle possessed by a malevolent force that appears in "Tricycle of Terror". Billy got it from a mysterious boy from a supernatural porta-potty, who warns him to always love it. It is capable of repairing damages to itself. The haunted bike attacks Irwin, Pud'n, and Sperg after they antagonize it and Billy. After realizing that Trykie is evil, Billy reluctantly allows Mandy to destroy it.

==== Master Control ====
Master Control is a supercomputer who appears in "The House of No Tomorrow". He operates the House of Tomorrow attraction and claims to know everything, though he is eventually proven wrong. Originally benevolent, he became violent after a young Harold annoyed him with many questions and ordered all robots to attack people. This led the House of Tomorrow being closed down, leaving a tour guide named Tom trapped inside. Many years later, Master Control was reactivated by the main characters and again turned violent when Billy makes him angry.

== Introduced in Evil Con Carne ==
=== Main ===
==== Hector Con Carne ====
Hector Con Carne is a billionaire playboy with aspirations of world domination. His body was destroyed in a bomb trap set by Cod Commando, which also destroyed his mansion. Hector's brain and stomach survived and were preserved in a jar filled with antiseptic for his safety. Hector is very irritable towards his failed attempts to rule the world.

==== Major Dr. Ghastly ====
Major Dr. Ghastly
- First appearance: "Evil Con Carne"
- Last appearance: "Company Halt"
- Voiced by: Grey DeLisle

In-universe information
- Alias: Major Doctor
- Gender: Female
- Occupation: Mad scientist
- Relatives: Destructicus Con Carne (future son)
- Nationality: American

Major Doctor Andedonia J. Ghastly is the lover and mad scientist of Evil Con Carne. She used to be the second assistant to Professor Death Ray Eyes and decided to apply for Hector Con Carne. She instantly fell in love with Hector for seven years. Ghastly is the most optimistic of the crew since she would rather let her love towards Hector bloom instead of helping Hector achieve his goal of world domination.

==== Boskov ====
Boskov
- First appearance: "Evil Con Carne"
- Last appearance: "Beware of the Undertoad"
- Voiced by: Jesse Corti (2000); Frank Welker (2001–04, 2007)

In-universe information
- Alias: Good-For-Nothing Waste Of Fat
- Species: Bear
- Gender: Male
- Occupation: Circus bear

Boskov is a bear who was owned by Vlad, the ringmaster of a Russian circus. He was picked by Major Doctor Ghastly to carry both Hector Con Carne's brain and stomach. Even though Hector's brain controls most of Boskov, he wants to eat honey and resist Hector's commands. Boskov usually gets picked on by Hector.

==== Stomach ====
Stomach
- First appearance: "Evil Con Carne"
- Last appearance: "Beware of the Undertoad"
- Voiced by: Armin Shimerman

In-universe information
- Aliases: Hector's Stomach, Tummy
- Gender: Male
- Nationality: Mexican

Stomach is the stomach of Hector Con Carne. He is very gassy and only talks when food is discussed. In the segment "Gutless", Stomach was sick and Hector left him behind so he can invade Buckingham Palace. The invasion did not work since Hector decided to help Stomach instead.

=== Recurring ===
- Cod Commando (speaking voice by Maxwell Atoms, Robert Picardo and singing voice in "The Pie Who Loved Me") is a cod fish who works for SPORK and is Hector Con Carne's arch-nemesis, and is directly responsible for reducing him to a brain and stomach. He only speaks through "blah blah blah" and can be translated from different people such as Ghastly and Ensign Slaughter.
- Estroy (voiced by Maurice LaMarche) is Hector Con Carne's rival into dominating the world. Estroy uses more hostile ways to take over the world compared to Hector and wears a metal mask to hide his face.
- Destructicus Con Carne (voiced by Rino Romano) is the future son of Hector Con Carne and Major Doctor Ghastly and opposes his father's plans. He first appears in "The Time Hole Incident" as both a baby and an adult, warning Hector and his allies about the dangers of time travel.
- Enrique Jr. (voiced by Frank Welker, Dee Bradley Baker (Ultimate Evil only)) is Hector Con Carne's pet chihuahua and is Ghastly's favorite pet. In "Emotional Skarr", Ghastly and Hector built a robot based on Enrique Jr. to take over the world for Skarr, but accidentally self-destructs.
- Abraham Lincoln (voiced by Peter Renaday) is the former president of the United States of America and a member of the League of Nations. He also commands S.P.O.R.K. for helping him stop Hector Con Carne's evil schemes.

=== Minor ===
- Professor Death Ray Eyes (voiced by Maxwell Atoms) used to have Ghastly as his second assistant before she decided to work for Hector, as a drawing in "'Tiptoe Through the Tulips'". He made his only appearance in "League of Destruction", where he and the other villains argued who should lead the League, which ultimately dissolved the faction.

== Introduced in Underfist ==
- Bun Bun (voiced by David Wittenberg) is a marshmallow rabbit and the main antagonist of the Halloween special Underfist: Halloween Bash. In the film, he leads a candy army to take over the Surface with the help of Mindy.
