= Greg Eagles =

American actor

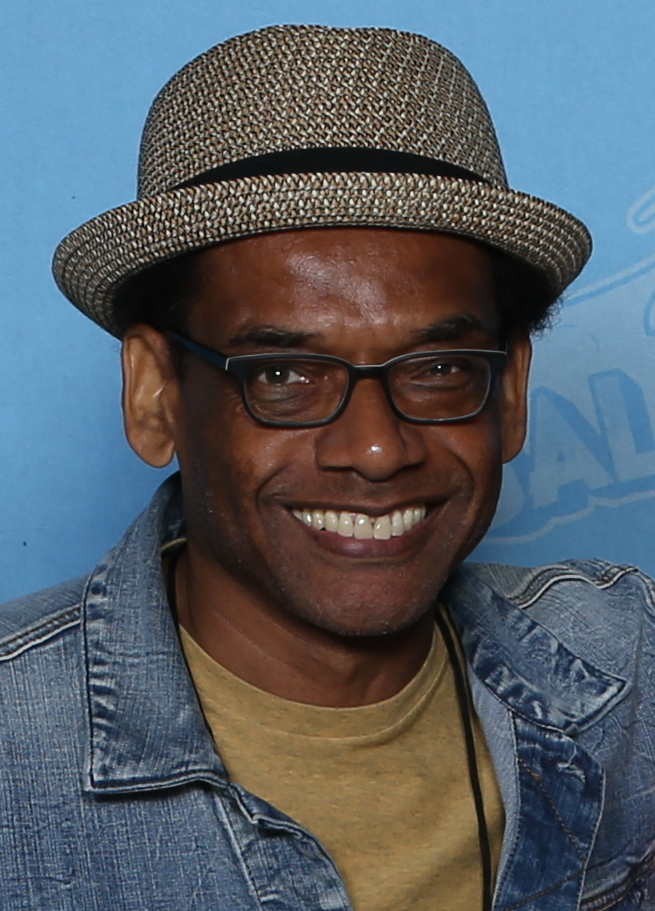
- Eagles at the 2020 GalaxyCon Richmond
- Born: Milwaukee, Wisconsin, U.S.
- Occupation: Actor
- Years active: 1993–present

Greg Eagles is an American actor. He voiced the Grim Reaper in Cartoon Network's Grim & Evil and its spin-off The Grim Adventures of Billy & Mandy, Captain Bob and Sketch Pad on HBO's Canadian-American children's television series Crashbox, Brother 6 and Rokutaro in Afro Samurai, Blind Mud Puddle Johnson in Cartoon Network’s Cow and Chicken, Aku Aku in the Crash Bandicoot video game franchise since 2007, and several characters in the Metal Gear Solid games.

== Early life ==
Eagles grew up in Milwaukee, Wisconsin. As a child, he was a fan of the Looney Tunes, especially veteran voice actor Mel Blanc and often did impressions.

== Career ==
Eagles began his acting career in 1993, when he made his professional acting debut in the television film Blindsided, where he played a detective. His other live acting credits include How to Live with Your Parents, L.A Heat, NYPD Blue, Pair of Kings, Sister, Sister, Snowfall, Teeth and Blood, The Burning Zone, The Hepburn Effect and The Riches.

He also works extensively as a voice actor, he has provided numerous characters voices in various animated films, anime, television shows and video games. In 1998, Eagles voiced companion character Sulik in Fallout 2. He voiced Blind Mud Puddle Johnson in Cartoon Network's animated series Cow and Chicken. In 2001, Eagles voiced the Grim Reaper in Cartoon Network's animated series Grim & Evil and its spin-off series, The Grim Adventures of Billy & Mandy. He has also reprised that role in the video game of the same name, the other Cartoon Network video games FusionFall and Punch Time Explosion, and in The Grim Adventures of the KND, the crossover episode with fellow Cartoon Network series Codename: Kids Next Door. In anime, he voiced O'Connor in 8 Man After, Brother 6 and Rokutaro in Afro Samurai and Afro Samurai: Resurrection and Zommari Rureaux, Gantenbainne Mosqueda in Bleach. He also voiced Brother 6 and Rokutaro in the Afro Samurai video game.

Since 2007, he has been the voice of Aku Aku in the Crash Bandicoot video game franchise, beginning with Crash of the Titans. He has since reprised the role in Crash: Mind over Mutant, Crash Bandicoot N. Sane Trilogy, Crash Team Racing Nitro-Fueled and Crash Bandicoot 4: It's About Time. Additionally, he also provided the voices of Jax Briggs and Baraka in Mortal Kombat X, and Gray Fox, Donald Anderson, and various other characters in the Metal Gear Solid franchise.

Eagles also created and starred in Teapot, an animated pilot about a boy who wishes to be a rapping superstar that aired as part of Random! Cartoons. The pilot was storyboarded and art directed by Dahveed Kolodny Nagy (creator of Supa Pirate Booty Hunt) as well as Alex Almaguer, who worked as a writer and storyboard artist on Billy & Mandy, and directed by Robert Alvarez. He is planning to turn the pilot into a full TV-series when it gets picked up, even making an online opening sequence and full theme song. The cartoon short also had a Kickstarter and a now-lost Indiegogo campaign for a video game adaptation, Teapot Rap it Up!, but the project failed to reach its $2,500 goal.

== Filmography ==
=== Film ===
Year	Title	Role	Notes
2002	Globehunters: An Around the World in Eighty Days Adventure	Old Lion, Tiger	Voice
2007	Garfield Gets Real	Eli	Voice
2008	Garfield's Fun Fest	Eli	Voice
2009	Garfield's Pet Force	Eli	Voice
2012	Foodfight!	Hairless Hamster Henchman	Voice
2012	Batman: The Dark Knight Returns	Mackie, Ben Derrick	Voice; direct-to-video
2015	Teeth and Blood	Vampire Priest	

=== Television ===
Year	Title	Role	Notes
1993	Blindsided	Detective #1	Television film
1994	Sister, Sister	Customer	Episode: "Joey's Choice"
1995	ABC Weekend Special	Sly Boy	Episode: "Jirimpimbira: An African Folk Tale"
1996, 2010	The Bold and the Beautiful	Waiter, Kevin	3 episodes
1996	What a Cartoon!	Fix (voice)	Episode: "Buy One, Get One Free"
1996	The Real Adventures of Jonny Quest	Karl (voice)	Episode: "Manhattan Maneater"
1996	The Burning Zone	Zairian	Episode: "Blood Covenant"
1997	NYPD Blue	Wright Jamison	Episode: "Shady Dealings"
1998	Dexter's Laboratory	Various voices	2 episodes
1998	Invasion America	Phil Stark (voice)	13 episodes
1998	Oh Yeah! Cartoons	Stinger (voice)	Episode: "The Feelers"
1998–1999	Cow and Chicken	Blind Mud Puddle Johnson, various voices	2 episodes
1999	Todd McFarlane's Spawn	Charles (voice)	2 episodes
1999	The Wild Thornberrys	Giraffe, Wildebeest (voice)	Episode: "Stick Your Neck Out"
1999	The Powerpuff Girls	Sandman (voice)	Episode: "You Snooze, You Lose"
1999	Batman Beyond	Max's Dad, Jokerz Member (voice)	2 episodes
1999	Crashbox	Various voices	
2000	Lobo	Lobo (voice)	Web series; 6 episodes
2000	Johnny Bravo	Norm, Player #3 (voice)	Episode: "Air Bravo"
2001	The Zeta Project	Old Man (voice)	Episode: "The Accomplice"
2001–2002	Grim & Evil	Grim (voice)	Main cast
2003–2007	The Grim Adventures of Billy & Mandy	Grim (voice)	Main cast
2004	Megas XLR	Cal, Guy #1 (voice)	Episode: "DMV: Department of Megas Violations"
2007	Afro Samurai	Rokutaro (voice)	
2007	Billy & Mandy's Big Boogey Adventure	Grim (voice)	Television film
2007	Wrath of the Spider Queen	Grim, Sperg (voice)	Television film
2007	Random! Cartoons	Teapot (voice)	Episode: "Teapot"; also creator
2007	The Grim Adventures of the KND	Grim (voice)	Television film
2007–2008	Bleach	Zommari Rureaux, Gantenbainne Mosqueda (voice)	
2008	The Riches	Mark	Episode: "Field of Dreams"
2008	Underfist: Halloween Bash	Grim, Candy Bar (voice)	Television film
2009	Afro Samurai: Resurrection	Rokutaro (voice)	Television film
2010–2012	Pair of Kings	Tarantula Witch Doctor	4 episodes
2013	How to Live with Your Parents (For the Rest of Your Life)	Long-Haired Dude	Episode: "Pilot"
2015	The Hepburn Effect	Bo Dollar	Short film; also director and producer
2016	Bunnicula	Rusty Bones (voice)	Episode: "Garlicked"
2017	Snowfall	Husky	Episode: "Baby Teeth"
2025	Jellystone!	Grim (voice)	Episode: "Crisis on Infinite Mirths"

=== Video games ===
Year	Title	Role	Notes
1997	Interstate '76	Taurus	
1998	Fallout 2	Sulik	
1998	Metal Gear Solid	Gray Fox, Donald Anderson	
1999	Interstate '82	Taurus	
1999	Revenant	Ogrok Mort, Yhagoro, Townsmen	
2000	Star Trek: Klingon Academy	Torlek	
2000	Star Trek: New Worlds	Additional voices	
2001	Metal Gear Solid 2: Sons of Liberty	Peter Stillman	
2001	Star Trek: Armada II	Additional voices	
2002	Dexter's Laboratory: Mandark's Lab?	Action Hank	
2002	Soldier of Fortune II: Double Helix	William 'Butch' Abrams	
2002	Dead to Rights	Preacherman Jones, Rafshoon Diggs	
2002	Eternal Darkness	Michael Edwards, Chattur'gha	
2002	Icewind Dale II	Additional voices	
2002	Star Trek: Starfleet Command III	Commander Jureth	
2003	Hunter: The Reckoning – Wayward	Joshua	
2003	Hunter: The Reckoning – Redeemer	Additional voices	
2004	Metal Gear Solid: The Twin Snakes	Donald Anderson	
2004	EverQuest II	Additional voices	
2004	True Crime: New York City	Additional voices	
2005	Killer7	Garcian Smith	
2005	Quake 4	Morris	
2006	The Grim Adventures of Billy & Mandy	Grim	
2006	Marvel: Ultimate Alliance	Luke Cage	
2006	The Sopranos: Road to Respect	Additional voices	
2006	Superman Returns	Citizens of Metropolis	
2007	The Shield	Marques Hendryx	
2007	Crash of the Titans	Aku Aku	
2007	Unreal Tournament 3	Malcolm	
2008	Crash: Mind over Mutant	Aku Aku	
2008	Madagascar: Escape 2 Africa	Moto Moto	
2008	007: Quantum of Solace	Steven Obanno	
2008	Mercenaries 2: World in Flames	Blanco	
2009	FusionFall	Grim	
2009	Afro Samurai	Rokutaro	
2011	Cartoon Network: Punch Time Explosion	Grim	
2013	Grand Theft Auto V	Additional voices	
2015	Mortal Kombat X	Jax Briggs, Baraka	
2016	XCOM 2	US Soldier	
2016	Mafia III	Additional voices	
2016	Skylanders: Imaginators	Aku Aku	
2017	Crash Bandicoot N. Sane Trilogy	Aku Aku	
2019	Crash Team Racing Nitro-Fueled	Aku Aku	
2020	Crash Bandicoot 4: It's About Time	Aku Aku	

=== Theme park attractions ===
Year	Title	Role
1999-2018	The Eighth Voyage of Sinbad	Narrator
