= The Grim Adventures of Billy & Mandy =

American animated television series

- Also known as: Grim & Evil (2001-2003), Billy & Mandy
- Genre: Supernatural; Science fiction comedy; Comedy horror; Black comedy; Slapstick; Surreal humor
- Created by: Maxwell Atoms
- Voices of: Grey DeLisle; Richard Steven Horvitz; Greg Eagles; Vanessa Marshall
- Theme music composer: Gregory Hinde; Drew Neumann
- Composers: Gregory Hinde; Drew Neumann; Guy Moon (2001–2002)
- Country of origin: United States
- Original language: English
- No. of seasons: 6
- No. of episodes: 78 (160 segments) (list of episodes)

Production
- Executive producers: Maxwell Atoms; Brian A. Miller (S2–6)
- Producers: Vincent Davis (S1); Louis J. Cuck (S4–6)
- Running time: 6 minutes (pilot); 7–11 minutes (segments); 22 minutes (specials)
- Production company: Cartoon Network Studios (Note: Pilot produced by Hanna-Barbera.)

Original release
- Network: Cartoon Network
- Release: August 24, 2001 – November 9, 2007

Related
- Underfist: Halloween Bash (2008)

The Grim Adventures of Billy & Mandy (Note: Also shortened to simply Billy & Mandy) is an American animated comedy horror television series created by Maxwell Atoms for Cartoon Network. Set in the fictional town of Endsville, the series follows the titular two children named Billy and Mandy who, after winning a limbo game to save Billy's pet hamster, gain the mighty Grim Reaper as their "best friend forever". Grim, who is reluctant to serve the two children, has access to supernatural items, spells, and other abilities that often lead Billy and Mandy to interact with otherworldly environments, characters, or situations.

Billy & Mandy began on August 24, 2001, as Grim & Evil, in which it and Evil Con Carne aired together. In 2003 Grim & Evil was renamed as The Grim Adventures of Billy & Mandy and both show were split-up into 2 main shows since 2004, and ended its run on November 9, 2007. There were also three television movies produced, including Billy & Mandy's Big Boogey Adventure, along with a special episode, Underfist: Halloween Bash.

During its run, the series won one Emmy Award and one Annie Award, with nominations for one Daytime Emmy Award, three Golden Reel Awards, and two other Annie Awards. Billy & Mandy has also been made into a video game as well as various licensed merchandise.

== Premise ==
=== The Grim Adventures of Billy & Mandy ===
The series' main characters. From left to right: Billy, Mandy, and Grim.

The Grim Adventures of Billy & Mandy takes place in the fictional town of Endsville and is known for its grimmer and unhinged surreal atmosphere. The series centers around the exploits of Billy (Richard Steven Horvitz), a dimwitted yet happy-go-lucky boy; his friend Mandy (Grey DeLisle), a deadpan, cynical, and cold-hearted girl; and their best-friend-by-obligation Grim (Greg Eagles), a begrudging Jamaican-accented Reaper who is reluctant to serve the two children. After Billy and Mandy cheated at a limbo match against Grim to save Billy's pet hamster (in retaliation for putting the limbo rod too low for them to go under), he is enslaved in an unwanted permanent friendship with the children. Grim is miserable in the first days of his servitude, at times taking pleasure at the fantasy of killing them. However, he gradually adapts to the new life and even grows to care for Billy and Mandy, if only somewhat. Despite this, he desires to break free from his servitude.

Billy and Mandy use Grim's supernatural abilities and powers to venture into supernatural locations or environments, such as the Underworld, or the Netherworld, inhabited by an assortment of grotesque monstrous beasts. The duo also use Grim's enormously strong supernatural abilities or ties with a number of beastly characters to achieve goals or desires for themselves, often with twisted results. Famed fictional monsters including Dracula, the Wolfman and the bogeyman are also comically depicted in the series.

Supporting characters include Irwin (Vanessa Marshall), Billy's nerdy best friend who has a crush on Mandy; Harold (Richard Steven Horvitz), Billy's initially apathetic father who shares his son's stupidity in later episodes; Gladys (Jennifer Hale), Billy's loving yet mentally unstable mother; Mindy (Rachael MacFarlane), the snobby, stuck-up, and spoiled queen bee of Billy and Mandy's school; Sperg (Greg Eagles), the local bully who has a sensitive side; Hoss Delgado (Diedrich Bader), an overly-intense "spectral exterminator" who hunts supernatural creatures; Nergal (David Warner/Martin Jarvis), a friendship-seeking demon who later marries Billy's aunt and bears a son, Nergal Jr. (Debi Derryberry); General Skarr (Armin Shimerman), Billy's ill-tempered next door neighbor who originated in the Evil Con Carne animated series; Eris (Rachael MacFarlane) the Goddess of Chaos who causes trouble for her own amusement; and Jeff (Maxwell Atoms), a giant spider constantly trying to win the approval of the arachnophobic Billy, whom he sees as his father.

The series lacks continuity for the most part, as many episodes end with characters killed, exiled, or stuck in a situation. Characters sometimes display awareness of some events from previous episodes, but there are no clear character arcs or coherent plot lines tying the show together.

=== Evil Con Carne ===
Once upon a time, there was a jillionaire playboy who was blown up in a tremendous explosion. His brain survived... (Stomach, too!) ...and was attached to the body of a stupid circus bear. I am that brain. My name is Hector Con Carne, and I will one day rule the world! (Maniacal laughter)

— Hector Con Carne's brain (and stomach), in the opening title sequence

Hector Con Carne (voiced by Phil LaMarr), a wealthy crime lord and evil genius bent on world domination and the League of Nations, was caught in an explosion instigated by his nemesis, Cod Commando (Maxwell Atoms), a soldier for the Secret Paramilitary Organized Response Kommand (S.P.O.R.K.). The explosion scattered most of his body across the world. He was rescued by his assistant, mad scientist Major Dr. Ghastly (Grey DeLisle), who placed his only two surviving organs, his brain and stomach, into a pair of containment units. These were later installed into Boskov (Frank Welker), a bear from a Russian circus, giving Hector's brain partial control over Boskov's own will.

Hector, Ghastly, and his military leader, General Skarr (Armin Shimerman), then created a secret laboratory on an island with a bunny-shaped mountain known as "Bunny Island" (a parody of Ernst Stavro Blofeld's lair in the James Bond movies). Gathering an army, Con Carne resumed his quest for world domination and made a new goal: to find his missing body parts. The group's schemes typically end in failure, often due to the behavior and conflicts within the group: Skarr is tired of being directed by Hector and wishes to overthrow him; Ghastly cares more about her unrequited love for her boss than world domination; Hector himself is narcissistic, megalomaniacal and generally abusive towards his henchmen; and Boskov often gets distracted by his natural bear instincts, which frequently impedes or delays Hector’s global domination schemes.

== Voice cast ==
=== Main cast ===
- Richard Steven Horvitz as William / Billy, Harold (Billy's father), and Saliva (Mandy's pet dog)
- Grey DeLisle as Amanda / Mandy, Aunt Sis (Billy's aunt), Milkshakes (Billy's pet cat), and Major Dr. Ghastly
- Greg Eagles as Grim and Sperg

=== Recurring cast ===
- Vanessa Marshall as Irwin Dracula and Claire (Mandy's mother)
- Jennifer Hale as Gladys (Billy's mother)
- Jane Carr as Pud'n
- Rachael MacFarlane as Mindy and Eris
- Phil LaMarr as Lord Dracula; Tanya "Grand-mama" Dracula, Judge Roy Spleen, and Hector Con Carne
- Frank Welker as Boskov
- Dee Bradley Baker as Phillip (Mandy's father)
- Armin Shimerman as General Skarr, and Hector Con Carne's Stomach
- Maurice LaMarche as Estroy
- Diedrich Bader as Hoss Delgado
- Maxwell Atoms as Cod Commando, and Jeff the Spider
- David Warner as Nergal Sr. (2001–2002)
- Martin Jarvis as Nergal Sr. (2003–2008)
- Debi Derryberry as Nergal Jr.
- Peter Renaday as Abraham Lincoln
- Rino Romano as Destructicus Con Carne
- Chris Cox as Principal Goodvibes
- Renee Raudman as Ms. Butterbean
- Fred Willard as Boogeyman
- C. H. Greenblatt as Fred Fredburger

== Episodes ==
Season	Episodes	Series	Originally released	
Season	Episodes	Series	First released	Last released
1	13	Grim & Evil (episodes 1–8 except "Battle of the Bands"); The Grim Adventures of Billy & Mandy ("Battle of the Bands" and episodes 9–13)	August 24, 2001	August 1, 2003
2	13	The Grim Adventures of Billy & Mandy	July 18, 2003	October 22, 2004
3	13	The Grim Adventures of Billy & Mandy	October 1, 2004	June 17, 2005
4	13	The Grim Adventures of Billy & Mandy	June 24, 2005	October 21, 2005
5	13	The Grim Adventures of Billy & Mandy	January 6, 2006	August 9, 2006
6	13	The Grim Adventures of Billy & Mandy	October 6, 2006	November 9, 2007

== Production ==
The genesis of Billy & Mandy occurred in 1995, when Maxwell Atoms, then a junior at the University of the Arts in Philadelphia, made a two-minute short film for his thesis project. Titled Billy and Mandy in: The Trepanation of the Skull and You, the film focuses on Mandy explaining trepanning to Billy in an advertising manner before he agrees to do it and is subsequently rendered unconscious. It was not shown publicly until 2016 at the first TromAnimation Film Festival. After the screening, Atoms uploaded the film to his YouTube channel, albeit in a deteriorating state after years of storage.

While working on the first season of Cow and Chicken, Atoms was approached by Hanna-Barbera executives for ideas for new short films. Among the ideas he presented to Hanna-Barbera was "Milkman", centering on an anthropomorphic, superhero milk carton who saves the missing children depicted on his back. Though the idea was rejected, executives were interested in Billy and Mandy, two characters that were to be featured in the project. Atoms was prompted to devise a series centering on the two children. Feeling that the characters Billy and Mandy would not be enough to carry a show, he began devising a third character to round out the main cast. He was always fascinated by the idea of a little girl befriending the Devil or the Grim Reaper, but eventually settled on the latter, as Cartoon Network did not approve of depictions of the devil after Cow and Chicken. Atoms pitched the Billy & Mandy concept to Cartoon Network and Nickelodeon, to which Cartoon Network approved the production of a short film 6 months later (which would become the short/pilot "Meet the Reaper").

The show was put into full production after the result of a viewer poll event by way of telephone and the Internet called Cartoon Network's Big Pick which was held from June 16 to August 25, 2000. The three final choices were The Grim Adventures of Billy & Mandy, Whatever Happened to... Robot Jones?, and Longhair and Doubledome. Out of the three, Billy & Mandy attained the most votes with 57%; Robot Jones came in second place at 23% while Longhair and Doubledome received 20% of the vote.

Originally part of Grim & Evil, Billy & Mandy served as the main show. In each episode, an Evil Con Carne short was put between two Grim shorts. An original Evil Con Carne short was produced in 2000 after Meet the Reaper, but Cartoon Network wanted to combine the series, to have a "B cartoon" as a middle segment. The series premiered on August 24, 2001, during the Cartoon Cartoon Fridays Big Pick Weekend.

Another 13 half-hour episode order was produced for Grim & Evil but they never aired in US. On June 13, 2003, the network separated the two segments and gave each their own half-hour program. The split came as a result of Cartoon Network wanting to move away from three 7-minute segments and focus on two 11-minute segments instead. After both series aired their respective new seasons, the network gave Atoms a decision to continue one series and drop the other from production. Atoms opted to continue Billy & Mandy and accepted the network's decision, as he considered running both shows stressful. Atoms ultimately went with Billy & Mandy, and the final season of Evil Con Carne subsequently aired in 2004. He embraced the network's decision to drop one of the two series, as he considered being in charge of producing both shows difficult.

Evil Con Carne characters occasionally appear on The Grim Adventures of Billy & Mandy. General Skarr was introduced as a recurring character in season 2, where he became Billy's new next-door neighbor. Another episode shows Ghastly, Hector, Boskov, and Stomach restarting their evil organization and convincing Skarr to rejoin them.

Atoms, who had been diagnosed with Asperger syndrome in adulthood, stated that the series' three main characters harken to the autism spectrum. He compared Mandy to "the cold, rational way [he] learned to view the world in order to survive", Billy to "the fun and joyous inner-world where [he] likes to spend [his] time" and Grim as "the moral mediator between the two."

On March 20, 2022, Craig McCracken revealed that years ago Cartoon Network had plans for a spinoff series titled Cheeseburger featuring Fred Fredburger and Cheese from Foster's Home for Imaginary Friends, but the idea never gained traction.

Grim, Billy, and Mandy appeared in the Jellystone! special Crisis on Infinite Mirths, with Eagles, Horvitz and DeLisle all reprising their roles.

=== Censorship ===
During its Grim & Evil run, "The Smell of Vengeance" was subject to censorship in the wake of the September 11 attacks. The episode's plot involves Hector and his army using a weapon that produces foul-smelling odors on New York City, sending its citizens into a frenzy. "There are the twin towers, and you see tiny, little people hopping off the roof of the towers into the water", said Linda Simensky, then senior vice president of animation for Cartoon Network. "I mean, two weeks ago, you wouldn't have thought about it. What were the chances of anyone jumping out of the World Trade Center?" In response, Atoms reworked the episode, so it took place in rural Kansas instead; despite these changes, the episode was temporarily suspended from broadcast rotation.

== Reception ==
Common Sense Media gave the show a 3/5 star rating and stated that it has "goofy punchlines and obscure cultural references" and recommends the viewer age be at least 9 years old. Entertainment Weekly ranked The Grim Adventures of Billy & Mandy number nine on its list of "10 Best Cartoon Network Shows" in 2012.

=== Awards and nominations ===
The series has won one Annie Award and two Emmy Awards and has been nominated nine times for various awards.

Year	Award	Category	Nominee(s)	Result
2002	Golden Reel Awards	Best Sound Editing in Television Animation	Glenn Oyabe, Jesse Aruda, and Rob Desales (for "The Smell of Vengeance: Pt. 1 & 2/Fiend Is Like Friend Without the "R")	Nominated
2003	Golden Reel Awards	Best Sound Editing in Television Animation – Music	Glenn Oyabe (for "Little Rock of Horrors"/"The Pie Who Loved Me"/"Dream a Little Dream")	Nominated
2005	Golden Reel Awards	Best Sound Editing in Television Animation	Glenn Oyabe, Jesse Aruda, Erik Sequeira, and Cecil Broughton (for "Super Zero/Sickly Sweet")	Nominated
2005	Annie Awards	Directing in an Animated Television Production	Brian Sheesley (for "Nursery Crimes")	Nominated
2005	Annie Awards	Directing in an Animated Television Production	Shaun Cashman and Phil Cummings (for "Attack of the Clowns")	Won
2006	Annie Awards	Directing in an Animated Television Production	Shaun Cashman (for "Hill Billy")	Nominated
2006	Emmy Awards	Outstanding Individual Achievement in Animation	Michael Diederich (for Puddle Jumping)	Won
2007	Emmy Awards	Outstanding Individual Achievement in Animation	Phil Rynda (for Billy & Mandy's Big Boogey Adventure)	Won
2007	Daytime Emmy Awards	Broadband-Children's	The Grim Adventures of Billy & Mandy	Nominated

== Media ==
=== TV movies ===
Three television films were produced:

- Billy & Mandy's Big Boogey Adventure (2007) sees Grim stripped of his powers by the underworld, and Billy, Mandy, Grim, and Irwin must race the Boogey Man and his crew of monster pirates to capture a powerful artefact capable of making whoever wields it into the scariest being alive.
- Billy & Mandy: Wrath of the Spider Queen (2007) When Grim's past comes back to haunt him, Billy and Mandy must join forces with their greatest enemies Jeff the Spider and Mindy respectively, to save the day from evil spiders trying to take over the whole world – and to do that, Billy must conquer his fear of spiders.
- Underfist: Halloween Bash (2008) focuses on Irwin, Jeff, Hoss, Skarr, and Fred inadvertently coming together to defeat an invasion of chocolate bar monsters, led by an evil marshmallow bunny, on Halloween night.

=== Music ===
The score composers for the series are Gregory Hinde, Drew Neumann, and Guy Moon. In addition, two songs were made for the show by Aurelio Voltaire, the episode "Little Rock of Horrors", which parodies the musical Little Shop of Horrors, features a song titled "Brains!" and, in Billy & Mandy's Big Boogey Adventure, the song "Land of the Dead" is played in the opening credits. Both songs are a part of the album Spooky Songs For Creepy Kids. The episode "Battle of the Bands" also featured the song "Darkness" by gothic industrial rock band SPF-1000. The end credits music of "Billy & Mandy Save Christmas" is the song "Round and Round" by glam metal band Ratt.

=== Video games ===
Midway Games published two video games based on the series in 2006, each featuring the same plot but different gameplay. The first, a 3D fighting game, was developed by High Voltage Studios and released in North America on September 25, 2006, for the PlayStation 2 and GameCube, and on November 19, 2006, for the Wii as a launch title. The second, a sidescrolling beat 'em up, was developed by Full Fat and released on October 31, 2006, for the Game Boy Advance. Characters from the series have also appeared in Cartoon Network crossover video games, such as FusionFall and Cartoon Network: Punch Time Explosion.

== Home media ==
On January 1, 2021, The Grim Adventures of Billy & Mandy was added to HBO Max in United States.

The Grim Adventures of Billy & Mandy home media releases
Title	Release date	Episodes
Nine Creepy Cartoon Capers	August 10, 2004 ( (United States) )	"Billy & Mandy's Jacked-Up Halloween"
Nine Creepy Cartoon Capers	November 22, 2007 ( (Australia) )	"Billy & Mandy's Jacked-Up Halloween"
Yuletide Follies	October 5, 2004 ( (United States) )	"Son of Nergal"
Ed, Edd n Eddy: Edifying Ed-ventures	May 10, 2005 ( (United States) )	"Nursery Crimes"
Ed, Edd n Eddy: Edifying Ed-ventures	May 15, 2006 ( (United Kingdom) )	"Nursery Crimes"
Grossest Halloween Ever	August 9, 2005 ( (United States) )	"Night of the Living Grim"
Codename: Kids Next Door: Sooper Hugest Missions: File Two	August 23, 2005 ( (United States) )	"Crushed"
Christmas Rocks	October 4, 2005 ( (United States) )	"Battle of the Bands"
Sweet Sweet Fear	September 12, 2006 ( (United States) )	"The Bubble With Billy"
Cartoon Network Fridays	September 19, 2006 ( (United States) )	"Herbicidal Maniac"
Christmas #3	October 3, 2006 ( (United States) )	"Billy & Mandy Save Christmas"
Billy & Mandy's Big Boogey Adventure	April 3, 2007 ( (United States) )	1. Billy & Mandy's Big Boogey Adventure; 2. "Bully Boogie"
Billy & Mandy's Big Boogey Adventure	December 4, 2007 ( (Australia) )	1. Billy & Mandy's Big Boogey Adventure; 2. "Bully Boogie"
Season 1	September 18, 2007 ( (United States) )	1. "Meet the Reaper" / "Evil Con Carne" / "Skeletons in the Water Closet"; 2. "Opposite Day" / "Emotional Skarr" / "Look Alive!"; 3. "Mortal Dilemma" / "Evil Goes Wild" / "Get Out of My Head!"; 4. "The Smell of Vengeance" / "Fiend Is Like Friend Without the 'R'"; 5. "Recipe for Disaster"; 6. "A Dumb Wish"; 7. "Grim vs. Mom" / "Tastes Like Chicken"; 8. "Grim or Gregory?" / "Something Stupid This Way Comes"; 9. "A Grim Surprise" / "Beasts & Barbarians"; 10. "Hoss Delgado: Spectral Exterminator" / "Evil on Trial" / "To Eris Human"; 11. "Billy's Growth Spurt" / "Billy & the Bully"; 12. "Big Trouble in Billy's Basement" / "Tickle Me Mandy"; 13. "Little Rock of Horrors" / "Dream a Little Dream"; 14. "It's Hokey Mon!" / "Tween Wolf"; 15. "Grim in Love" / "Love is "Evol" Spelled Backwards"; 16. "Mandy, the Merciless" / "The Really Odd Couple"; 17. "Brown Evil"; 18. "Educating Grim" / "Toadblatt's School of Sorcery"; 19. "Creating Chaos"; 20. "Who Killed Who?"; 21. "Crushed" / "Night of the Living Grim"; 22. "Battle of the Bands"
Collection 2	February 10, 2010 ( (Australia) )	1. "Go-Kart 3000!" / "Smarten Up!"; 2. "The Grim Show"; 3. "Son of Nergal"; 4. "The Crawling Niceness" / "Chicken Ball Z"; 5. "Grim for a Day" / "Sister Grim" / "The Halls of Time"; 6. "Billy & Mandy's Jacked-Up Halloween"; 7. "Spider's Little Daddy" / "Tricycle of Terror"; 8. "Dumb Luck" / "No Body Loves Grim"; 9. "Li'l Porkchop" / "Skarred for Life"; 10. "House of Pain" / "A Grim Prophecy" / "Mandy Bites Dog"; 11. "Nursery Crimes" / "My Peeps"; 12. "Nigel Planter and the Chamber Pot of Secrets" / "Circus of Fear"; 13. "Bully Boogie" / "Here Thar Be Dwarves!"; 14. "Which Came First?" / "Substitute Teacher"; 15. "Super Zero" / "Sickly Sweet"; 16. "Bearded Billy" / "The Nerve"
Hall of Fame #3	June 23, 2015 ( (United States) )	1. "Meet the Reaper" / "Skeletons in the Water Closet"; 2. "Opposite Day" / "Look Alive!"; 3. "Mortal Dilemma" / "Get Out of My Head!"; 4. "Fiend Is Like Friend Without the 'R'"; 5. "Recipe for Disaster"; 6. "A Dumb Wish"; 7. "Grim vs. Mom" / "Tastes Like Chicken"; 8. "Grim or Gregory?" / "Something Stupid This Way Comes"; 9. "A Grim Surprise" / "Beasts & Barbarians"; 10. "Hoss Delgado: Spectral Exterminator" / "To Eris Human"; 11. "Billy's Growth Spurt" / "Billy & the Bully"; 12. "Big Trouble in Billy's Basement" / "Tickle Me Mandy"; 13. "Little Rock of Horrors" / "Dream a Little Dream"; 14. "Crushed"; 15. "Battle of the Bands"
