= Cartoon Network: Punch Time Explosion =

2011 crossover fighting video game

- North American cover for the Nintendo 3DS version
- Developer: Papaya Studio
- Publishers: NA: Crave Games; PAL: Deep Silver; PAL: OG International (XL)
- Composer: Billy Martin
- Platforms: Nintendo 3DS, PlayStation 3, Wii, Xbox 360
- Release: Nintendo 3DS: NA: 2 June 2011; EU: 20 April 2012; AU: 2012; PlayStation 3, Wii, Xbox 360: NA: 15 November 2011; AU: 17 May 2012; EU: 18 May 2012
- Genre: Fighting
- Modes: Single-player, multiplayer

Cartoon Network: Punch Time Explosion is a 2011 crossover fighting video game developed by Papaya Studio and published by Crave Games, for the Nintendo 3DS. It features characters from various Cartoon Network programs battling against one another. The game was released in June 2011 in North America and in April 2012 in Europe. An upgraded port, Cartoon Network: Punch Time Explosion XL, was released for the Wii, PlayStation 3 and Xbox 360 less than a year later.

== Gameplay ==
Ben Tennyson fighting enemies in the Chowder universe, as seen in the first level of the game's story mode.

Cartoon Network: Punch Time Explosion is a platform fighter, with up to four players moving and battling on a 2D plane and trying to knock their opponents out of the arena. Each playable character has a unique set of moves they can use to attack their opponents, performed by pressing a direction in combination with one of the attack buttons. When players strike one another, glowing cubes will fall out of them; collecting these cubes will gradually fill the player's special meter. When full, the player can use their character's "Punch Time Explosion", a powerful attack that can deal heavy damage to multiple opponents. For example, Ben Tennyson turns into Ultimate Humungosaur and launches missiles all over the stage. Players can also use various items that appear randomly on the stage to attack their opponents, including an item that summons one of 19 assist characters (22 in the XL version) to aid the player. In the XL version, playable characters can team up with certain assist characters and do Synergy attacks. For example, Chowder eats a plate of Madame Foster's cookies and becomes morbidly obese as the latter rolls him around the stage. Players can choose between 21 different stages for battles (26 in the XL version). Many stages shift between multiple phases as the battle continues, and players may use stage elements in order to take out other players. For example, in the Dexter's Laboratory stage, players can pull two different levers, with one activating a conveyor belt and the other firing a deadly laser.

=== Playable characters ===
Players can choose from 18 playable characters drawn from 11 Cartoon Network programs. An additional 8 characters were added to the XL version for a total of 26.

- Aku (Note: XL-exclusive.) (Samurai Jack)
- Ben Tennyson (Ben 10)
- Billy & Mandy (The Grim Adventures of Billy & Mandy)
- Blossom (The Powerpuff Girls)
- Bubbles (The Powerpuff Girls)
- Buttercup (The Powerpuff Girls)
- Captain K'nuckles (The Marvelous Misadventures of Flapjack)
- Captain Planet (Captain Planet and the Planeteers)
- Chowder & Kimchi (Chowder)
- Dexter (Dexter's Laboratory)
- Father (Codename: Kids Next Door)
- Flapjack (The Marvelous Misadventures of Flapjack)
- Grim (The Grim Adventures of Billy & Mandy)
- Him (The Powerpuff Girls)
- Hoss Delgado (The Grim Adventures of Billy & Mandy)
- Johnny Bravo (Johnny Bravo)
- Kevin Levin (Ben 10)
- Mac & Bloo (Foster's Home for Imaginary Friends)
- Mojo Jojo (The Powerpuff Girls)
- Monkey (Dexter's Laboratory)
- Numbuh One (Codename: Kids Next Door)
- Samurai Jack (Samurai Jack)
- The Scotsman (Samurai Jack)
- Toiletnator (Codename: Kids Next Door)
- Vilgax (Ben 10)
- Young Ben Tennyson (Ben 10)

== Plot ==
An unseen announcer, implied to be Space Ghost, prepares to watch some television on his day off as he tunes into Cartoon Network. However, he discovers that an unknown force is causing chaos in the respective universes of some of its programs, with villains traversing between them and many heroes becoming corrupted. The announcer watches the events unfold, beginning with Ben Tennyson traveling to the Chowder universe in pursuit of Vilgax. Ben restores a corrupted Chowder, but Vilgax escapes as the Chowder universe is engulfed in static. Chowder and Ben are then pulled into the latter's origin program, where they oppose a corrupted Buttercup. She too is restored and, after travelling across the dimension, it begins to fade as well. However, Dexter arrives in a dimension-traveling capsule and rescues the trio. The allied heroes then use the capsule to travel to the network's programs one by one, defeating the displaced villains while restoring the corrupted heroes and recruiting them to their cause before their respective dimensions are terminated.

Having gathered a large team of heroes, the capsule prepares to make one more warp to save the network, but it is destroyed as the heroes are intercepted by the mastermind behind the events, the announcer's recently-purchased remote control, which has since gained sentience. The device prepares to eliminate the heroes, but they inadvertently summon Captain Planet, who rescues them. The heroes then defeat the remote control and it reverts back to its inanimate state, which Dexter uses to restore the balance between the network and send him and the other heroes back to their origin programs. Though relieved everything is back to normal, the announcer laments about no longer having a remote, forcing him to change the channel independently.

== Home console version ==
On 3 October 2011, Papaya Studio announced a home console version of the game, titled Cartoon Network: Punch Time Explosion XL, which was released for the Wii, PlayStation 3 and Xbox 360. XL adds eight new playable characters to the roster, four of whom were assist characters in the 3DS version. The port also adds seven new assist characters, five new stages, and additional gameplay modes. An in-game shop allows players to purchase new playable characters, stages, alternate costumes and clips from the various Cartoon Network shows represented in the game. Alterations were made to the game's story mode to accommodate the new character additions. XL also revised parts of the game's voice acting, with some characters who were not voiced by their original actors on the 3DS version getting new voice clips by their actors from their respective series.

The European release of the game was delayed until nearly a year after the North American release. The game was released on 18 May 2012, in the UK; on 14 June 2012, in France; and on 22 August 2012, in Italy and Spain via the PlayStation Store.

== Reception ==
Reception

Aggregate score
Aggregator	Score
Metacritic	(3DS) 58/100

Review scores
Publication	Score
Game Informer	4.75/10
GamePro	7/10
GameSpot	5.5/10 (XL) 5.5/10
GamesRadar+	(XL) 2.5/5
IGN	4.5/10 (XL) 5/10
Nintendo Life	6/10
Nintendo Power	7/10
Nintendo World Report	7.5/10 (XL) 8.5/10
Official Nintendo Magazine	5.6/10
Pocket Gamer	2.5/5

Cartoon Network: Punch Time Explosion received mixed reviews. Jack DeVries of IGN gave the game a rating of 4.5 and said "the fun comes in very small doses", and felt that "the levels, though aesthetically varied, are basic and boring", negatively comparing its gameplay to that of the Super Smash Bros. series. The game was also criticized for not using many then recent Cartoon Network characters such as those from Adventure Time and Regular Show and using characters from series that have ended prior to the game's release, with Ben 10: Ultimate Alien being the only ongoing series at the time of release, as well as not using other popular former Cartoon Network characters like Courage the Cowardly Dog, Cow and Chicken and Ed, Edd n Eddy.

The XL version of the game was slightly better received. IGN's Jack DeVries gave the XL version a rating of 5.0, saying that "Having so many characters in one game is cool, but the story is the laziest way to do it".

== See also ==
- MultiVersus, a 2024 platform fighter also featuring Cartoon Network characters
