= Evil Con Carne =

American animated television series

- Genre: Science fiction comedy; Black comedy; Surreal humor; Slapstick
- Created by: Maxwell Atoms
- Story by: Maxwell Atoms; Gord Zajac; Alex Almaguer; Vincent Davis; C. H. Greenblatt
- Voices of: Phil LaMarr; Grey DeLisle; Armin Shimerman; Frank Welker
- Composers: Gregory Hinde; Drew Neumann
- Country of origin: United States
- Original language: English
- No. of seasons: 2
- No. of episodes: 13 (Note: Includes 32 segments)

Production
- Executive producers: Maxwell Atoms; Brian A. Miller
- Producer: Vincent Davis
- Running time: 7–11 minutes
- Production company: Cartoon Network Studios

Original release
- Network: Cartoon Network
- Release: August 24, 2001 – October 22, 2004

Related
- Grim & Evil; The Grim Adventures of Billy & Mandy

Evil Con Carne is an American animated television series created by Maxwell Atoms for Cartoon Network. The series centers on wealthy crime lord Hector Con Carne, who is reduced to his brain and stomach following an assassination attempt and subsequently implanted onto Boskov, a bear from a Russian circus. Aided by his assistant, mad scientist Major Dr. Ghastly, and military leader General Skarr, Hector now oversees criminal organization Evil Con Carne, continuing his quest for world domination.

Evil Con Carne began on August 24, 2001, as a segment on Grim & Evil, in which it and The Grim Adventures of Billy & Mandy aired together. The series aired separately beginning July 11, 2003, and ended its run on October 22, 2004. 13 episodes consisting of 32 segments were produced.

Following the series' end, its characters would frequently make cameo appearances in Billy & Mandy, with General Skarr becoming a recurring character. A crossover episode with Billy & Mandy, titled "Company Halt", aired on March 16, 2007.

== Premise ==
Once upon a time, there was a jillionaire playboy who was blown up in a tremendous explosion. His brain survived... (Stomach, too!) ...and was attached to the body of a stupid circus bear. I am that brain. My name is Hector Con Carne, and I will one day rule the world! (Maniacal laughter)

— Hector Con Carne's brain (and stomach), in the opening title sequence

Hector Con Carne (voiced by Phil LaMarr), a wealthy crime lord and evil genius bent on world domination and the League of Nations, was caught in an explosion instigated by his nemesis, Cod Commando (Maxwell Atoms), a soldier for the Secret Paramilitary Organized Response Kommand (S.P.O.R.K.). The explosion scattered most of his body across the world. He was rescued by his assistant, mad scientist Major Dr. Ghastly (Grey DeLisle), who placed his only two surviving organs, his brain and stomach, into a pair of containment units. These were later installed into Boskov (Frank Welker), a bear from a Russian circus, giving Hector's brain partial control over Boskov's own will.

Hector, Ghastly, and his military leader, General Skarr (Armin Shimerman), then created a secret laboratory on an island with a bunny-shaped mountain known as "Bunny Island" (a parody of Ernst Stavro Blofeld's lair in the James Bond movies). Gathering an army, Con Carne resumed his quest for world domination and made a new goal: to find his missing body parts. The group's schemes typically end in failure, often due to the behavior and conflicts within the group: Skarr is tired of being directed by Hector and wishes to overthrow him; Ghastly cares more about her unrequited love for her boss than world domination; Hector himself is narcissistic, megalomaniacal and generally abusive towards his henchmen; and Boskov often gets distracted by his natural bear instincts, which frequently impedes or delays Hector’s global domination schemes.

== Voice cast ==
=== Main ===
- Phil LaMarr as Hector Con Carne
- Grey DeLisle as Major Dr. Ghastly
- Armin Shimerman as General Skarr and Hector's stomach
- Frank Welker as Boskov

=== Recurring voices ===
- Maxwell Atoms as Cod Commando
- Maurice LaMarche as Estroy
- Peter Renaday as Abraham Lincoln
- Rino Romano as Destructicus Con Carne

== Production ==
A viewer's poll to decide a new Cartoon Network animated series, titled Big Pick, was held on the Internet from June 16 to August 25, 2000. The three choices for short films to become animated series were The Grim Adventures of Billy & Mandy, Whatever Happened to... Robot Jones?, and Longhair and Doubledome. After the event, the Meet the Reaper short film won with 57% of the vote. While Whatever Happened to... Robot Jones? became an animated series in 2002, Longhair and Doubledome appeared at another Big Pick event, but lost once again. Another original short/pilot titled Evil Con Carne had been produced in 2000, shortly after the Billy & Mandy short. The two ideas were ultimately combined into a single show, as Cartoon Network desired a show that had a "middle cartoon" as an in-between segment (a format found in the Dial M for Monkey and The Justice Friends shorts in Dexter's Laboratory, and the I Am Weasel segments on Cow and Chicken).

The resulting show, Grim & Evil, premiered on August 24, 2001, and was put on hiatus on October 18, 2002. In 2003, 13 more half-hour episodes of Grim & Evil were made, but aired when Cartoon Network separated the two series, and The Grim Adventures of Billy & Mandy and Evil Con Carne earned their own full-length series later that year. After production wrapped on both series' new seasons, the network gave Maxwell Atoms a decision to choose one show to continue, while the other would be dropped from production. Atoms ultimately went with Billy & Mandy, and the final season of Evil Con Carne subsequently aired in 2004. He embraced the network's decision to drop one of the two series, as he considered being in charge of producing both shows difficult.

After Evil Con Carne was cancelled, its characters appeared in minor roles in The Grim Adventures of Billy & Mandy, and General Skarr became a recurring character. According to Tom Warburton, characters from Evil Con Carne were originally set to appear in the television special "The Grim Adventures of the KND". Hector, General Skarr, and Dr. Ghastly briefly appear in the end credits as character costumes for Lazlo, Raj, and Clam in a Camp Lazlo crossover titled "Evil Camp Carne".

=== Censorship ===
During its Grim & Evil run, "The Smell of Vengeance" was subject to censorship in the wake of the September 11 attacks. The episode's plot involves Hector and his army using a weapon that produces foul-smelling odors on New York City, sending its citizens into a frenzy. "There are the twin towers, and you see tiny, little people hopping off the roof of the towers into the water", said Linda Simensky, then senior vice president of animation for Cartoon Network. "I mean, two weeks ago, you wouldn't have thought about it. What were the chances of anyone jumping out of the World Trade Center?" In response, Atoms reworked the episode, so it took place in rural Kansas instead; despite these changes, the episode was temporarily suspended from broadcast rotation.

== Episodes ==
Note: Most of the episodes did not air in production code order.

Episodes are listed in accordance with their order on the Amazon Prime streaming service.

Season	Episodes	Series	Originally released	
Season	Episodes	Series	First released	Last released
1	9	Grim & Evil (episodes 1–6 except "Max Courage!" and "Ultimate Evil"); Evil Con Carne ("Max Courage!", "Ultimate Evil", and episodes 7–9)	August 24, 2001	October 22, 2004
2	4	Evil Con Carne	October 1, 2004	October 22, 2004

=== Season 1 (2001–04) ===
The first six episodes of this season were originally aired as segments on Grim & Evil in the U.S., with the exception of "Max Courage!" and "Ultimate Evil" which aired on the standalone Evil Con Carne. The latter three episodes were part of the standalone Evil Con Carne in the U.S., but instead aired as part of Grim & Evil in the United Kingdom.

No.	Title	Directed by	Written by	Storyboard by	Original release date	Prod. code
1a	"Evil Con Carne"	Maxwell Atoms	Maxwell Atoms	TBA	August 24, 2001	TBA
Hector Con Carne orders his staff mad scientist, Major Doctor Ghastly, to build him a new body after Boskov the Bear messes up Con Carne's latest plan for world domination by heading for food instead of battle.
1b	"Emotional Skarr"	Brian Hogan	Maxwell Atoms	Bob Camp & Joe Orrantia	August 31, 2001	TBA
Major Doctor Ghastly makes her latest world-domination device, but General Skarr, Hector's Chief of Staff, uses the giant robot dog (modeled after Con Carne's tiny little chihuahua, Enrique Jr.) to attempt to kill Boskov and Hector instead of trying to take over the world with it.
1c	"Evil Goes Wild"	Dave Brain	Gord Zajac	Greg Miller	September 7, 2001	TBA
Boskov is captured by park rangers and put in the zoo, where (true to form) Hector mobilizes the other captive bears to take over the world.
2a	"Evil on Trial"	Robert Alvarez & John McIntyre	Story by : Gord Zajac	David Mucci Fassett	August 9, 2002	TBA
General Skarr turns Hector in to the FBI when he finds out that Con Carne is "the World's 23rd Most Wanted" criminal with a large cash bounty on his head. When it turns out no lawyer on earth will defend Hector, he finds himself in court defended by Major Doctor Ghastly – and prosecuted by the Cod Commando.
2b–2c	"The Smell of Vengeance" (Note: "The Smell of Vengeance" is a 14-minute episode aired in two parts.)	Dave Brain	Maxwell Atoms	Greg Miller Maxwell Atoms	December 14, 2001	TBA
Doctor Ghastly's latest version of a world-domination device is The Almighty Stink Ray, with which Hector threatens to stink up the entire world unless he is given a huge ransom and small piece of land in Montana. Cod Commando, the only soldier without a nose, is sent to destroy the Almighty Stink Ray.
3a	"Bring Me the Face of Hector Con Carne"	Dave Brain	Story by : Gord Zajac	Matt Sullivan	July 19, 2002	TBA
Dr. Ghastly discovers that Hector's face may still be intact and sends out a search party to get it. This episode also reveals how Dr. Ghastly and Hector met, as well as how Hector was defeated by Cod Commando in the first place.
3b–3c	"Devolver" (Note: "Devolver" is a 14-minute episode aired in two parts.)	Brian Hogan	Maxwell Atoms	Mike Stern Bob Camp	October 5, 2001	TBA
General Skarr accidentally walks through Doctor Ghastly's devolving ray and begins to revert to his primitive forms, including a giant ape and starts to terrorize the Con Carne base.
4a	"Everyone Loves Uncle Bob"	John McIntyre & Brian Hogan	Story by : Gord Zajac	Trevor Wall	August 2, 2002	TBA
Hector takes over a Mister Rogers-type children's show in an attempt to rule the world by first winning over the children.
4b–4c	"Tiptoe Through the Tulips" (Note: "Tiptoe Through the Tulips" is a 14-minute episode aired in two parts.)	Brian Hogan Dave Brain	Vincent Davis	Bob Camp	October 12, 2001	TBA
Boskov goes into hibernation on the very day Hector has set for the invasion of the world. Con Carne gets away from the hibernating Boskov by breaking the container that houses him on the bear's head, then finds himself stuck in a pickle jar for the next six months, waiting for Boskov to come out of his winter sleep.
5a	"Max Courage!"	Robert Alvarez & John McIntyre	Gord Zajac	Alex Almaguer	August 15, 2003	TBA
Major Doctor Ghastly captures an old friend and forces him to help her build a destructive machine.
5b	"The Time Hole Incident"	Dave Brain	Story by : Gord Zajac	Nora Johnson	October 4, 2002	TBA
Major Doctor Ghastly invents the Temporal Confabulationater Izationizer Unit – a time machine that works so well that Ghastly, Hector, and Skarr end up meeting their future selves and Destructicus Con Carne, son of Ghastly and Hector, as both an infant and an adult.
5c	"Christmas Con Carne"	Robert Alvarez & John McIntyre	Story by : Gord Zajac	Alex Almaguer	October 11, 2002	TBA
Rupert the Green-Nosed Reindeer saves Christmas when Hector Con Carne tries to ruin it.
6a	"Search & Estroy"	Dave Brain	Story by : Gord Zajac	Alex Almaguer	July 26, 2002	TBA
Skarr is evesdropping on Hector and Dr. Ghastly about their new secret weapon—a disintegration gun. To their dismay Estroy comes up with a better version of the gun. He also surprises them by inviting them to dinner. Hector accepts as a way to steal some of his ideas. Hector and Ghastly arrive at Estroy's neighboring island while Skarr slips around the back. Of course he falls while scaling the wall and lands in a pond of electric eels. At dinner, Estroy tries to recruit Dr. Ghastly. In the meantime, Skarr has gotten into the building and he reaches the secret plans. Estroy reveals that his intentions were to make Dr. Ghastly his new assistant. She is reluctant to the idea and they leave in a huff. Back at home, Skarr reveals the plans to them and they immediately begin construction.
6b	"The Pie Who Loved Me"	John McIntyre	Story by : Gord Zajac	Alex Almaguer	October 18, 2002	TBA
This is a mini musical. At first, Hector is singing about some of the things he adores. This leads into why he should take over the world (classical). This goes into Dr. Ghastly singing about her scientific work, leading into her baking pies for science (pop). The pies are sent to all the people who are singing about the temptation of pies in the sky. Skarr breaks in with a solo about hitting people with pies. Even Boskov gets a solo (rock opera). Meanwhile, the organization that is here to stop Evil is out of commission from too much pie; as are all the citizens. This leads back into Hector rejoicing in song about his success with the pie scheme until Cod Commando infiltrates the "pie in the sky" with a patriotic tune. In the end, no one could fight any one any more because they have had "too much pie".
6c	"Ultimate Evil"	Shaun Cashman	Story by : Maxwell Atoms & Alex Almaguer	Alex Almaguer	October 22, 2004	TBA
Tired of consistently failing at his attempts to rule the world, Hector orders General Skarr to make Boskov into a vicious monster. Boskov in his new form manages to take down Cod Commando and the entire army of SPORK on his own, but when General Skarr pushes Boskov too far, Boskov starts attacking Hector and Skarr for mistreating him. Only Ghastly is able to stop Boskov. Cameo appearance(s): The Powerpuff Girls
7a	"Gutless!"	Juli Hashiguchi	Story by : Gord Zajac	David Mucci Fassett	July 11, 2003	TBA
While planning to invade Buckingham Palace in Great Britain, Hector's stomach falls ill and makes him lose confidence in the plan.
7b	"Day of the Dreadbot"	Juli Hashiguchi	Story by : Gord Zajac	Brian Kindregan	July 11, 2003	TBA
Hector gets fed up with his army and replaces it with robots, which overthrow the Evil Con Carne island.
7c	"League of Destruction"	Patty Shinagawa	Story by : Gord Zajac	Alex Almaguer	July 11, 2003	TBA
Hector believes that all of the evil geniuses in the world are keeping each other from conquering the Earth, so he unites them all to come up with an ultimate plan. All of the evil geniuses end up arguing, instead.
8a	"Son of Evil"	Juli Hashiguchi	Story by : Gord Zajac	David Mucci Fassett	July 18, 2003	TBA
Destructicus Con Carne, the son of Hector and Major Doctor Ghastly, comes back from the future to help his parents. Hector is disappointed in his son when he finds out Destructicus is a crime fighting super hero.
8b	"The Right to Bear Arms"	Randy Myers	Story by : Gord Zajac	Michael Diederich	July 18, 2003	TBA
Major Doctor Ghastly invents a new machine called the Cerebro-Ransmuter 2000, which is meant to transfer Hector from Boskov's head to General Skarr's. An error causes the two to switch arms, instead.
8c	"The Trouble with Skarrina"	Robert Alvarez & John McIntyre	Story by : Gord Zajac	Matt Sullivan	July 18, 2003	TBA
Evil Con Carne's enemy, Estroy, builds a robotic woman for General Skarr in revenge after he and Ghastly ruined his chrome polisher. Skarr does not realize it is a trap and ignores all of the warnings he is given.
9a	"Go Spork"	Robert Alvarez & John McIntyre	Story by : Gord Zajac	Trevor Wall	August 1, 2003	TBA
A response team called SPORK tries to stop Hector from brainwashing the world with a telemarketing scheme.
9b	"Boskov's Day Out"	Juli Hashiguchi	Story by : Gord Zajac	Alex Almaguer	August 1, 2003	
Major Doctor Ghastly takes Boskov for a walk in the park while Vlad, Boskov's old trainer, tries to get Boskov back.
9c	"Cod vs. Hector"	John McIntyre & Randy Myers	Story by : Gord Zajac	Alex Almaguer	August 1, 2003	TBA
Hector, Boskov, and Cod Commando realize they have got to work together to survive on a deserted island.

=== Season 2 (2004) ===
No. overall	No. in season	Title	Directed by	Story by	Storyboard by	Original release date	Prod. code
10a	1a	"No No Nanook"	Juli Hashiguchi & Phil Cummings	Michael Diederich	Michael Diederich	October 1, 2004	TBA
Hector tries to freeze the Earth, but accidentally disrupts the planet's gravity in the process.
10b	1b	"Teenage Idol"	Juli Hashiguchi & Robert F. Hughes	Maxwell Atoms	Maxwell Atoms & Octavio E. Rodriguez	October 1, 2004	TBA
Hector requires the aid of a legendary living stone idol to rule the world. However, the idol is immature and only agrees to help Hector if he can date Major Doctor Ghastly.
11a	2a	"The Mother of All Evils"	Juli Hashiguchi & Robert F. Hughes	Maxwell Atoms & Alex Almaguer	Alex Almaguer	October 8, 2004	TBA
Hector is nervous because his blind mother visits him and does not know that he is only a brain and a stomach.
11b	2b	"The HCCBDD"	Shaun Cashman & Phil Cummings	Maxwell Atoms & Brett Varon	Brett Varon	October 8, 2004	TBA
Hector is depressed that he has not been able to take over the world yet, and feels he is missing something. Then Major Doctor Ghastly creates the HCCBDD, which she intends to show Hector the following day. Even though he does not know what it is, Estroy tries to steal the HCCBDD, only to figure out it is Hector's surprise birthday party.
12a	3a	"Gridlocked and Loaded"	Juli Hashiguchi & Steve Socki	C. H. Greenblatt	C. H. Greenblatt	October 15, 2004	TBA
Evil Con Carne plans to steal gold from a ship, but ends up getting stuck in traffic for hours.
12b	3b	"Fool's Paradise"	Phil Cummings & Juli Hashiguchi	C. H. Greenblatt	Mary Hanley & Maxwell Atoms	October 15, 2004	TBA
Evil Con Carne goes on vacation, where Hector has a good time, Major Doctor Ghastly is bothered by Estroy, and General Skarr has a bad time.
13a	4a	"Jealousy, Jealous Do"	Robert F. Hughes & Juli Hashiguchi	C. H. Greenblatt & Maxwell Atoms	Mike Bell & Maxwell Atoms	October 22, 2004	TBA
Hector gets a new secretary who turns out to be a Swedish spy that Major Doctor Ghastly is jealous of. The secretary flirts with Boskov, not knowing that only Hector knows the plans she is trying to obtain.
13b	4b	"Hector, King of the Britons"	Brian Sheesley	Maxwell Atoms, Vincent Waller, Grey DeLisle, Phil LaMarr, Armin Shimerman, Rosalind Ayres, & Greg Ellis	Vincent Waller	October 22, 2004	TBA
Hector wants to rule Britain, so he goes to Great Britain to find Excalibur, but the Lady of the Lake may not give it to him even after he does things to prove himself worthy.

=== Crossover episode (2007) ===
Title	Directed by	Story by	Storyboard by	Original release date
"Company Halt"	Kris Sherwood	Maxwell Atoms & Alex Almaguer	Alex Almaguer	March 30, 2007
As General Skarr is once again annoyed by Billy, Hector Con Carne and Major Dr. Ghastly arrive in his house with the intention of luring him back to the recently relaunched Evil Con Carne world domination organization. Although initially refusing to rejoin, Skarr later accepts with the condition that Billy and the other neighbors be destroyed. After weeks of living together and preparations, Evil Con Carne's ultimate weapon is revealed to be an army of tanks that shoot giant rubber bands. In the end, their all-out attack over the neighborhood is foiled when Billy tricks Hector into shooting Skarr's garden and they get into a fight, causing Hector to get crushed by the giant thumb on one of the tanks. Note: This episode aired as a segment of The Grim Adventures of Billy & Mandy.

== Home media ==
Five episodes are included as bonus features in the Season 1 DVD set for The Grim Adventures of Billy & Mandy. On August 16, 2018, the entire series was added to the iTunes Store under a single volume.

American releases
Product	Season(s)	Episodes	Format	Release date
The Grim Adventures of Billy & Mandy: Season 1	1–2	5 (1–3, 6, 10)	DVD	September 18, 2007
Evil Con Carne: The Complete Series	1–2	13	Digital purchase	August 16, 2018

== See also ==
- The Grim Adventures of Billy & Mandy
- Grim & Evil
