= Grim & Evil =

American animated television series

- Genre: Animated comedy
- Created by: Maxwell Atoms
- Voices of: Grey DeLisle; Greg Eagles; Richard Horvitz; Phil LaMarr; Armin Shimerman; Frank Welker
- Theme music composer: Gregory Hinde; Drew Neumann
- Ending theme: "Grim & Evil", performed by Jennifer Hale
- Composers: Gregory Hinde; Drew Neumann; Guy Moon
- Country of origin: United States
- Original language: English
- No. of seasons: 2
- No. of episodes: 27 (77 segments)

Production
- Executive producer: Maxwell Atoms
- Producer: Vincent Davis
- Running time: 22 minutes
- Production company: Cartoon Network Studios

Original release
- Network: Cartoon Network
- Release: August 24, 2001 – October 22, 2004

Related
- The Cartoon Cartoon Show; The Grim Adventures of Billy & Mandy; Evil Con Carne

Grim & Evil is an American animated television series created by Maxwell Atoms for Cartoon Network. It consists of two segments which were eventually spun off into their own series, The Grim Adventures of Billy & Mandy and Evil Con Carne.

The Grim Adventures of Billy & Mandy deals with two children named Billy and Mandy, who bet that the Grim Reaper would lose to them at his own game of limbo in an effort to save Billy's pet hamster. Billy and Mandy win the bet, and Grim becomes their "best friend forever" as part of their deal. Evil Con Carne follows Hector Con Carne, a wealthy crime lord playboy whose body is destroyed in a tremendous explosion. His only surviving organs are his brain and stomach, which have been placed in jars and attached to a circus bear named Boskov.

The show premiered on August 24, 2001, and ended its first 13-episode run on October 18, 2002. However, there was also another batch of 13 episodes made for the show, but Cartoon Network split both shows separately in 2003. The second (and final) season of this era was aired in the UK in October 2003, followed by a 27th episode in the US as a combo special on October 22, 2004.

== Premise ==
The Grim Adventures of Billy & Mandy is a series about two neighborhood schoolchildren: moronic yet enthusiastic Billy (voiced by Richard Horvitz) and emotionless yet intelligent Mandy (Grey DeLisle), who force the Grim Reaper (Greg Eagles) to be their best friend forever after defeating the Messenger of Death in a game of Limbo. This is often the main segment, as two The Grim Adventures of Billy & Mandy episodes are typically wrapped around an episode of Evil Con Carne (or, on rare episodes, vice versa).

Evil Con Carne is a series about Hector Carne (Phil LaMarr), an aspiring Mexican dictator obsessed with taking over the world, whose disembodied brain is transplanted onto the head of slow-witted Russian circus bear Boskov (Frank Welker). He is assisted by kind-hearted mad scientist Major Dr. Ghastly (Grey DeLisle) and cold-hearted paramilitary leader General Skarr (Armin Shimerman). This is usually the backup to The Grim Adventures of Billy & Mandy as Evil Con Carne is put between two Billy & Mandy cartoons. On occasion, the format is reversed, with two Evil cartoons sandwiching one Grim cartoon.

== Production ==
=== Conception and viewer poll ===
The series' existence is largely the result of a viewer poll. An Internet and call-in event called the Big Pick was held from June 16 to August 25, 2000. The three final choices were The Grim Adventures of Billy & Mandy, Whatever Happened to... Robot Jones?, Longhair and Doubledome. Out of the three, Grim & Evil won the poll with 57% of the vote and became its own series. Whatever Happened to... Robot Jones? would later be made into a full series; Longhair and Doubledome would reappear with another pilot episode in another Big Pick-style show in 2002, only to fall short once again.

Maxwell Atoms created a student film titled "Billy and Mandy in 'Trepanation of the Skull and You'" in 1995. Atoms reused ideas from his student film to create the animated short "Meet the Reaper" for Cartoon Network. Along with Billy & Mandy, Atoms produced another short, Evil Con Carne, that would later be combined with the former as one show, under the title Grim & Evil. The decision came as Cartoon Network wanted the show to have a "middle cartoon" to air in between the Billy & Mandy segments (similar to the Dial M for Monkey and The Justice Friends shorts in Dexter's Laboratory, and the I Am Weasel segments on Cow and Chicken). Sometimes the format was reversed, with a single Grim segment in between two Evil shorts. Both sides of the show were influenced by cartoons Atoms watched in the 1980s; Grim took inspiration from classic comedies from Hanna-Barbera and Warner Bros., while Evil was a spoof of the era's action cartoons such as G.I. Joe and Transformers.

=== Broadcast and spin-offs ===
Though initially announced by Betty Cohen in February 2001 for an October premiere, the first season instead premiered on Cartoon Network on August 24, 2001, to kick off the "Cartoon Cartoon Fridays Big Pick Weekend". A second season consisting of 13 episodes was announced in March 2002.

In 2003, the network separated Grim & Evil into their own full-length series, The Grim Adventures of Billy & Mandy and Evil Con Carne, despite the 2003 episodes having originally been made for Grim & Evil. In 2004, Evil Con Carne was given another season with a new animation style, but Maxwell Atoms chose to end the series, as he believed running two shows was stressful and that Billy & Mandy had more creative potential. On October 22, 2004, Cartoon Network aired the half-hour Billy & Mandy/Evil Con Carne combo: "Five-O-Clock Shadows" and "Ultimate Evil", with it being the final half-hour Grim & Evil episode. While the two segments weren't exactly produced for Grim and Evil, they aired on the same night, leading to fan rumors that it makes up Episode 27.

Evil Con Carne's General Skarr became a recurring character on Billy and Mandy beginning in the second season, including as a main character in the TV film Underfist, with other Evil Con Carne characters making occasional cameo appearances. On March 16, 2007, Cartoon Network aired the 11-minute Billy & Mandy/Evil Con Carne crossover episode titled "Company Halt".

Grim & Evil, in its original form, has only been rarely seen on TV since 2003, with most reruns being in the separate Billy & Mandy and Evil Con Carne formats. The Grim & Evil theme song was occasionally seen on The Cartoon Cartoon Show from 2005 to 2008. In October 2023, Adult Swim's Checkered Past aired the series in its original format, despite listings referring to the show as Billy & Mandy.

== Episodes ==
| Season | Segments | Episodes | Originally released | |
| Season | Segments | Episodes | First released | Last released |
|---|---|---|---|---|
| 1 | 39 | 13 | August 24, 2001 | October 18, 2002 |
| 2 | 38 | 13 | June 13, 2003 | October 22, 2004 |

The first season originally aired from 2001 to 2002 and consists of 13 episodes, with the first half of 6 episodes airing in 2001 and the remaining 7 airing in 2002 after a hiatus. Another batch of 13 episodes produced for the series aired from 2003 to 2004, but were separated into the standalone Billy & Mandy and Evil Con Carne series in the U.S. In the UK & Canada, these episodes aired as part of Grim & Evil.

=== Season 1 (2001–02) ===
| No. | Title | Directed by | Written by | Storyboard by | Original release date | Prod. code |
|---|---|---|---|---|---|---|
| 1a | "Meet the Reaper" | Maxwell Atoms | Maxwell Atoms | Maxwell Atoms | June 9, 2000 (Cartoon Cartoon Fridays) (Note: The pilot aired on Cartoon Cartoon Summer as part of Cartoon Cartoon Fridays.); August 24, 2001 | TBA |
| 1b | "Evil Con Carne" | Maxwell Atoms | Maxwell Atoms | TBA | August 24, 2001 | TBA |
| 1c | "Skeletons in the Water Closet" | Dave Brain | Greg Miller | Greg Miller | August 24, 2001 | TBA |
| 2a | "Opposite Day" | Dave Brain | Maxwell Atoms | Mike Stern | August 31, 2001 | TBA |
| 2b | "Emotional Skarr" | Brian Hogan | Maxwell Atoms | Bob Camp & Joe Orrantia | August 31, 2001 | TBA |
| 2c | "Look Alive!" | Brian Hogan | Maxwell Atoms | Paul McEvoy | August 31, 2001 | TBA |
| 3a | "Mortal Dilemma" | Brian Hogan | Amy Rogers | Michael Diederich | September 7, 2001 | TBA |
| 3b | "Evil Goes Wild" | Dave Brain | Gord Zajac | Greg Miller | September 7, 2001 | TBA |
| 3c | "Get Out of My Head!" | Dave Brain | Maxwell Atoms | Maxwell Atoms | September 7, 2001 | TBA |
| 4a | "The Smell of Vengeance" | Dave Brain | Maxwell Atoms | Greg Miller | December 14, 2001 | TBA |
| 4c | "The Smell of Vengeance" | Brian Hogan | Maxwell Atoms | Maxwell Atoms | December 14, 2001 | TBA |
| 4b | "Fiend Is Like Friend Without the 'R'" | Brian Hogan | Craig Lewis | Paul McEvoy | December 14, 2001 | TBA |
| 5a | "Devolver" | Brian Hogan | Maxwell Atoms | Mike Stern | October 5, 2001 | TBA |
| 5c | "Devolver" | Brian Hogan | Maxwell Atoms | Bob Camp | October 5, 2001 | TBA |
| 5b | "Recipe for Disaster" | Dave Brain | Maxwell Atoms | Michael Diederich | October 5, 2001 | TBA |
| 6a | "Tiptoe Through the Tulips" | Brian Hogan | Vincent Davis | Bob Camp | October 12, 2001 | TBA |
| 6c | "Tiptoe Through the Tulips" | Dave Brain | Vincent Davis | Bob Camp | October 12, 2001 | TBA |
| 6b | "A Dumb Wish" | Brian Hogan | Paul McEvoy | Paul McEvoy | October 12, 2001 | TBA |
| 7a | "Grim vs. Mom" | Brian Hogan | Story by : Gord Zajac | Alex Almaguer | July 19, 2002 | TBA |
| 7b | "Bring Me the Face of Hector Con Carne" | Dave Brain | Story by : Gord Zajac | Matt Sullivan | July 19, 2002 | TBA |
| 7c | "Tastes Like Chicken" | Brian Hogan & John McIntyre | Story by : Gord Zajac | Michael Diederich | July 19, 2002 | TBA |
| 8a | "Grim or Gregory?" | Brian Hogan | Story by : Gord Zajac | Shellie Kvilvang | July 26, 2002 | TBA |
| 8b | "Search & Estroy" | Dave Brain | Story by : Gord Zajac | Alex Almaguer | July 26, 2002 | TBA |
| 8c | "Something Stupid This Way Comes" | Robert Alvarez & John McIntyre | Story by : Craig Lewis | Maxwell Atoms | July 26, 2002 | TBA |
| 9a | "A Grim Surprise" | Robert Alvarez & John McIntyre | Story by : Rob DeSales | John McIntyre | August 2, 2002 | TBA |
| 9b | "Everyone Loves Uncle Bob" | John McIntyre & Brian Hogan | Story by : Gord Zajac | Trevor Wall | August 2, 2002 | TBA |
| 9c | "Beasts & Barbarians" | Dave Brain | Story by : Gord Zajac | Michael Diederich | August 2, 2002 | TBA |
| 10a | "Hoss Delgado: Spectral Exterminator" | Brian Hogan | Story by : Gord Zajac | Brian Kindregan | August 9, 2002 | TBA |
| 10b | "Evil on Trial" | Robert Alvarez & John McIntyre | Story by : Gord Zajac | David Mucci Fassett | August 9, 2002 | TBA |
| 10c | "To Eris Human" | Dave Brain | Story by : Gord Zajac | Chris Savino | August 9, 2002 | TBA |
| 11a | "Billy's Growth Spurt" | Brian Hogan | Story by : Gord Zajac | Michael Diederich | October 4, 2002 | TBA |
| 11b | "The Time Hole Incident" | Dave Brain | Story by : Gord Zajac | Nora Johnson | October 4, 2002 | TBA |
| 11c | "Billy & the Bully" | Robert Alvarez & John McIntyre | Story by : Gord Zajac | Brett Varon | October 4, 2002 | TBA |
| 12a | "Big Trouble in Billy's Basement" | Robert Alvarez & John McIntyre | Story by : Gord Zajac | Christopher McCulloch (Jackson Publick) | October 11, 2002 | TBA |
| 12b | "Christmas Con Carne" | Robert Alvarez & John McIntyre | Story by : Gord Zajac | Alex Almaguer | October 11, 2002 | TBA |
| 12c | "Tickle Me Mandy" | Brian Hogan | Story by : Gord Zajac | David Mucci Fassett | October 11, 2002 | TBA |
| 13a | "Little Rock of Horrors" | Robert Alvarez | Story by : Gord Zajac | Maxwell Atoms | October 18, 2002 | TBA |
| 13b | "The Pie Who Loved Me" | John McIntyre | Story by : Gord Zajac | Alex Almaguer | October 18, 2002 | TBA |
| 13c | "Dream a Little Dream" | Dave Brain | Story by : Gord Zajac | Michael Diederich | October 18, 2002 | TBA |

=== Season 2 (2003–04) ===
Fourteen episodes premiered on Cartoon Network in the United States in 2003 and 2004 when The Grim Adventures of Billy & Mandy and Evil Con Carne were split into standalone shows, but they had been originally made for Grim & Evil. They were aired as part of Grim & Evil outside of the U.S., including on Cartoon Network UK and Ireland, Canada's Teletoon Detour, and France's Boing. Episodes 21, 25, and 26 do not contain any Evil Con Carne segments. The season, in its Grim & Evil format, was eventually released in October 2017 on Cartoon Network on Demand. This season is often incorrectly listed as "Season 3".

| No. overall | No. in season | Title | Directed by | Story by | Storyboard by | Original air date (U.S.) | U.K. air date | Prod. code |
|---|---|---|---|---|---|---|---|---|
| 14a | 1a | "It's Hokey Mon!" | Robert Alvarez & John McIntyre | Gord Zajac | Michael Diederich | June 13, 2003 | October 20, 2003 | TBA |
| 14b | 1b | "Boskov's Day Out" | Juli Hashiguchi | Gord Zajac | Alex Almaguer | August 1, 2003 | October 20, 2003 | TBA |
| 14c | 1c | "Tween Wolf" | Patty Shinagawa | Gord Zajac | David Mucci Fassett | July 4, 2003 | October 20, 2003 | TBA |
| 15a | 2a | "Grim in Love" | Robert Alvarez & John McIntyre | Gord Zajac | Brett Varon | July 11, 2003 | October 21, 2003 | TBA |
| 15b | 2b | "The Trouble with Skarrina" | Robert Alvarez & John McIntyre | Gord Zajac | Matt Sullivan | July 18, 2003 | October 21, 2003 | TBA |
| 15c | 2c | "Love is "Evol" Spelled Backwards" | Juli Hashiguchi | Craig Lewis | Paul McEvoy | July 11, 2003 | October 21, 2003 | TBA |
| 16a | 3a | "Mandy, the Merciless" | Patty Shinagawa | Gord Zajac | Alex Almaguer | June 27, 2003 | October 22, 2003 | TBA |
| 16a | 3a | "Mandy, the Merciless" | Patty Shinagawa | Gord Zajac | Alex Almaguer | October 2, 2023 (Adult Swim's Checkered Past) | October 22, 2003 | TBA |
| 16b | 3b | "Go Spork" | Robert Alvarez & John McIntyre | Gord Zajac | Trevor Wall | August 1, 2003 | October 22, 2003 | TBA |
| 16b | 3b | "Go Spork" | Robert Alvarez & John McIntyre | Gord Zajac | Trevor Wall | October 2, 2023 (Adult Swim's Checkered Past) | October 22, 2003 | TBA |
| 16c | 3c | "The Really Odd Couple" | John McIntyre & Randy Myers | Gord Zajac | David Mucci Fassett | June 27, 2003 | October 22, 2003 | TBA |
| 16c | 3c | "The Really Odd Couple" | John McIntyre & Randy Myers | Gord Zajac | David Mucci Fassett | October 2, 2023 (Adult Swim's Checkered Past) | October 22, 2003 | TBA |
| 17a | 4a | "Brown Evil" | Robert Alvarez | Gord Zajac | Paul McEvoy | June 20, 2003 | October 23, 2003 | TBA |
| 17c | 4c | "Brown Evil" | Patty Shinagawa | Gord Zajac | Paul McEvoy | June 20, 2003 | October 23, 2003 | TBA |
| 17b | 4b | "League of Destruction" | Patty Shinagawa | Gord Zajac | Alex Almaguer | July 11, 2003 | October 23, 2003 | TBA |
| 18a | 5a | "Go-Kart 3000!" | John McIntyre & Randy Myers | Gord Zajac | Michael Diederich | July 25, 2003 | October 24, 2003 | TBA |
| 18b | 5b | "Day of the Dreadbot" | Juli Hashiguchi | Gord Zajac | Brian Kindregan | July 11, 2003 | October 24, 2003 | TBA |
| 18c | 5c | "Smarten Up!" | Robert Alvarez & John McIntyre | Gord Zajac | David Feiss | July 18, 2003 | October 24, 2003 | TBA |
| 19a | 6a | "Educating Grim" | Juli Hashiguchi | Rachael MacFarlane | Brett Varon | June 13, 2003 | October 25, 2003 | TBA |
| 19b | 6b | "Gutless!" | Juli Hashiguchi | Gord Zajac | David Mucci Fassett | July 11, 2003 | October 25, 2003 | TBA |
| 19c | 6c | "Toadblatt's School of Sorcery" | Robert Alvarez | Ben Spergel | Michael Diederich & Maxwell Atoms | June 13, 2003 | October 25, 2003 | TBA |
| 20a | 7a | "Creating Chaos" | Patty Shinagawa | Gord Zajac | Brett Varon | June 27, 2003 | October 26, 2003 | TBA |
| 20b | 7b | "Max Courage!" | Robert Alvarez & John McIntyre | Written by: Gord Zajac | Alex Almaguer | August 15, 2003 | October 26, 2003 | TBA |
| 20c | 7c | "The Grim Show" | Robert Alvarez & John McIntyre | Craig Lewis | Trevor Wall | July 18, 2003 | October 26, 2003 | TBA |
| 21a | 8a | "Who Killed Who?" | Patty Shinagawa, John McIntyre, & Randy Myers | Gord Zajac | Paul McEvoy | July 4, 2003 | October 27, 2003 | TBA |
| 21b | 8b | "Son of Nergal" | Robert Alvarez | Gord Zajac | Paul McEvoy | July 25, 2003 | October 27, 2003 | TBA |
| 22a | 9a | "Crushed" | Robert Alvarez & John McIntyre | Gord Zajac | Brett Varon | July 11, 2003 | October 28, 2003 | TBA |
| 22b | 9b | "Son of Evil" | Juli Hashiguchi | Gord Zajac | David Mucci Fassett | July 18, 2003 | October 28, 2003 | TBA |
| 22c | 9c | "Night of the Living Grim" | Juli Hashiguchi | Gord Zajac | Spencer Laudiero | June 20, 2003 | October 28, 2003 | TBA |
| 23a | 10a | "Terror of the Black Knight" | Juli Hashiguchi | Craig Lewis | Alex Almaguer | August 1, 2003 | October 29, 2003 | TBA |
| 23b | 10b | "The Right to Bear Arms" | Randy Myers | Gord Zajac | Michael Diederich | July 18, 2003 | October 29, 2003 | TBA |
| 23c | 10c | "Battle of the Bands" | Robert Alvarez | Craig Lewis | Brett Varon | August 1, 2003 | October 29, 2003 | TBA |
| 24a | 11a | "The Crawling Niceness" | Robert Alvarez & John McIntyre | Maxwell Atoms | Maxwell Atoms | July 18, 2003 | October 30, 2003 | TBA |
| 24b | 11b | "Cod vs. Hector" | John McIntyre & Randy Myers | Gord Zajac | Alex Almaguer | August 1, 2003 | October 30, 2003 | TBA |
| 24c | 11c | "Chicken Ball Z" | Juli Hashiguchi | Ben Spergel | Matt Sullivan | August 15, 2003 | October 30, 2003 | TBA |
| 25a | 12a | "Grim for a Day" | Robert Alvarez | Craig Lewis | Paul McEvoy | August 15, 2003 | October 31, 2003 | TBA |
| 25b | 12b | "Sister Grim" | John McIntyre & Juli Hashiguchi | Gord Zajac | Brett Varon | July 25, 2003 | October 31, 2003 | TBA |
| 25c | 12c | "The Halls of Time" | John McIntyre & Randy Myers | Gord Zajac | Michael Diederich | August 1, 2003 | October 31, 2003 | TBA |
| 26 | Special | "Billy & Mandy's Jacked-Up Halloween" | Juli Hashiguchi & Robert Alvarez | Maxwell Atoms, Brett Varon, & Paul McEvoy | Brett Varon & Maxwell Atoms | October 1, 2003 | November 1, 2003 | TBA |
| 27a | 13a | "Five O' Clock Shadows" | Juli Hashiguchi | Brett Varon | Brett Varon | October 22, 2004 | October 31, 2004 | TBA |
| 27b | 13b | "Ultimate Evil" | Shaun Cashman | Maxwell Atoms & Alex Almaguer | Alex Almaguer | October 22, 2004 | October 31, 2004 | TBA |

=== Crossover episode (2007) ===
| Title | Directed by | Story by | Storyboard by | Original release date |
|---|---|---|---|---|
| "Company Halt" | Kris Sherwood | Maxwell Atoms & Alex Almaguer | Alex Almaguer | March 16, 2007 |
As General Skarr is once again annoyed by Billy, Hector Con Carne and Major Dr. Ghastly arrive in his house with the intention of luring him back to the recently relaunched Evil Con Carne world domination organization. Although initially refusing to rejoin, Skarr later accepts with the condition that Billy and the other neighbors be destroyed. After weeks of living together and preparations, Evil Con Carne's ultimate weapon is revealed to be an army of tanks that shoot giant rubber bands. In the end, their all-out attack over the neighborhood is foiled when Billy tricks Hector into shooting Skarr's garden and they get into a fight, causing Hector to get crushed by the giant thumb on one of the tanks. Note: This episode aired as a segment of The Grim Adventures of Billy & Mandy.

== Home media ==
On October 20, 2017, all 26 episodes produced were released on Cartoon Network on Demand, including 13 other episodes made up of segments that aired as separate series, but put together in their original Grim & Evil format (two Billy & Mandy segments surrounding one Evil Con Carne, except for three episodes where it is entirely Billy & Mandy).

== In other media ==
Grim, Billy, and Mandy made appearances in the Teen Titans Go! "Warner Bros. 100th Anniversary" special, and in the episode "Favorite Animated Show Nominee".

Grim, Boskov, Hector Con Carne, Billy, and Mandy appear in the Jellystone! crossover special Crisis on Infinite Mirths, with Greg Eagles reprising his role as Grim.

== Home media ==
Grim & Evil home media releases
| Title | Season(s) | Episode count | Region 1 release date | Episodes include |
|---|---|---|---|---|
| The Grim Adventures of Billy & Mandy: Season 1 | 1–2 | 13 | September 18, 2007 | "Meet the Reaper" – "The Smell of Vengeance: Part 2" • "Recipe for Disaster" • "A Dumb Wish" • "Grim vs. Mom" • "Tastes Like Chicken" • "Grim or Gregory?" • "Something Stupid This Way Comes" • "A Grim Surprise" • "Beasts & Barbarians" – "Billy's Growth Spurt" • "Billy & the Bully" • "Big Trouble in Billy's Basement" • "Tickle Me Mandy" • "Little Rock of Horrors" • "Dream a Little Dream" |
| The Grim Adventures of Billy & Mandy: Season 1 | 1–2 | 13 | June 23, 2015 (Disc 1 in Hall of Fame #3) | Entire first season (Grim episodes only, excluding Evil episodes) |

Other releases including The Grim Adventures of Billy & Mandy season one/Grim & Evil episodes:

- "Billy & Mandy's Jacked-Up Halloween" – Cartoon Network Halloween: 9 Creepy Cartoon Capers (August 10, 2004)
- "Son of Nergal" – Cartoon Network Christmas: Yuletide Follies (October 5, 2004)
- "Night of the Living Grim" – Cartoon Network Halloween 2: Grossest Halloween Ever (August 9, 2005)
- "Crushed!" – Codename: Kids Next Door: Sooper Hugest Missions: File Two (August 23, 2005)
- "Battle of the Bands" – Cartoon Network Christmas 2: Christmas Rocks (October 4, 2005)

The entire series of Grim & Evil was officially available on Cartoon Network on Demand from October 2017 until 2019.
