= Gregory Hinde =

American composer

- Genre: television music
- Works: The Grim Adventures of Billy & Mandy; Evil Con Carne

Gregory Hinde is an American composer. He has written music for animated television series such as The Grim Adventures of Billy & Mandy, Evil Con Carne and worked on the final season of The Wild Thornberrys. Gregory studied traditional performance, composition and arrangement at the Birmingham School of Music in England (now UCE Birmingham Conservatoire), and the London School of Creative Studies.
