= Maxwell Atoms =

American animator and voice actor

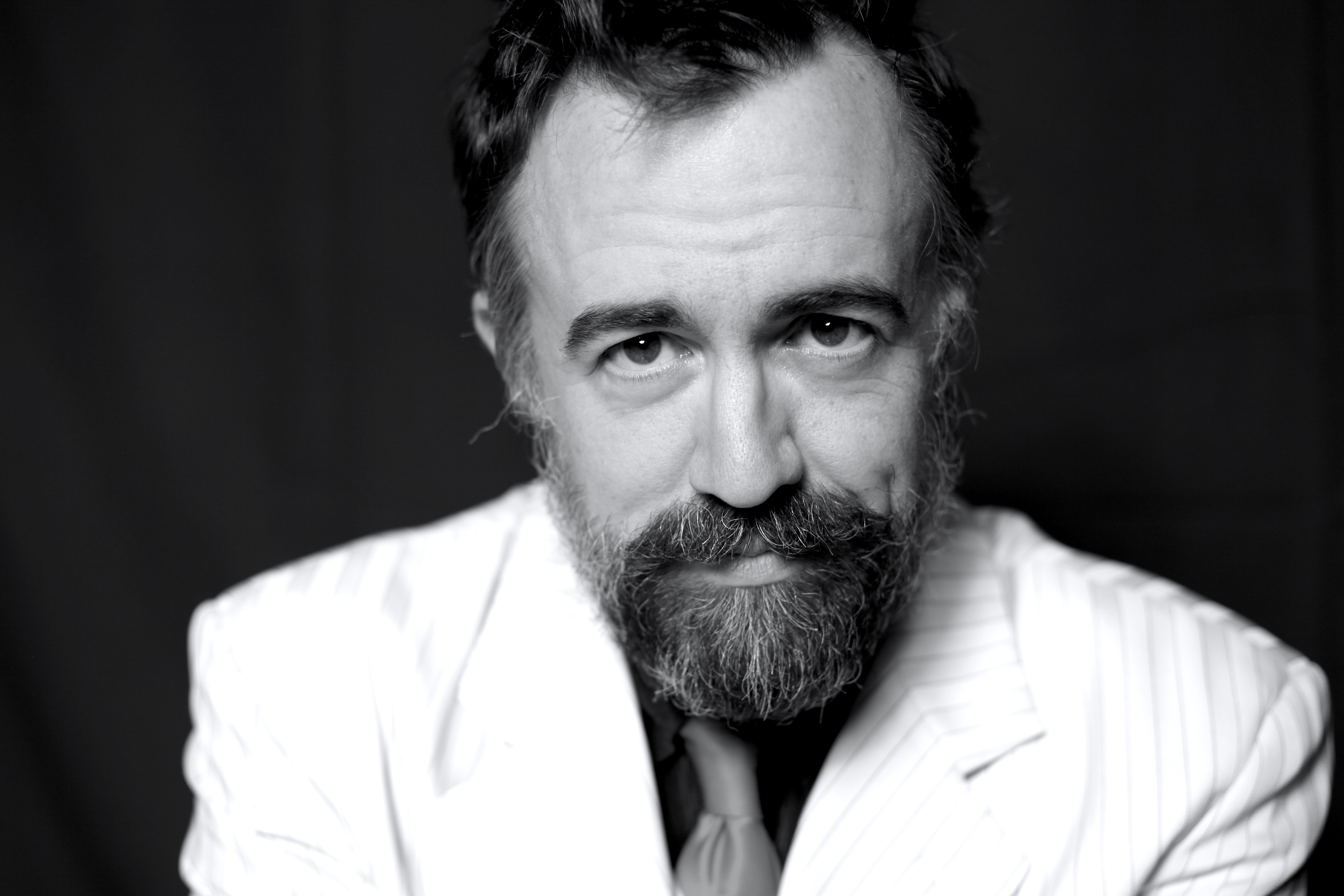
- Atoms in Los Angeles in 2017
- Born: Adam Maxwell Burton
- Occupations: Animator, screenwriter, storyboard artist, director, producer, voice actor
- Years active: 1995–present
- Known for: Grim & Evil; The Grim Adventures of Billy & Mandy; Evil Con Carne; Underfist; Bunnicula; Fish Hooks; Jellystone!

Adam Maxwell Burton, known professionally as Maxwell Atoms, is an American animator, screenwriter, storyboard artist and voice actor. He is the creator of the Cartoon Network series Grim & Evil and its subsequent spin-offs, The Grim Adventures of Billy & Mandy and Evil Con Carne.

== Career ==
Atoms is the creator of Cartoon Network's animated television series The Grim Adventures of Billy & Mandy, Evil Con Carne, and developed a Billy & Mandy spin-off Halloween special called Underfist: Halloween Bash. Atoms attended the University of the Arts in Philadelphia. Before he started working on his own series, Atoms was an intern at Film Roman, a freelance artist at Warner Bros., had a brief stint at WildBrain, and had also worked on The Twisted Tales of Felix the Cat. Atoms got a job at Hanna-Barbera and as a story and storyboard artist on Cow and Chicken and I Am Weasel. Atoms also performed the voice of Jeff the Spider and Piff on The Grim Adventures of Billy & Mandy, and voiced Cod Commando on Evil Con Carne. He also voiced several additional characters in the TV movie Billy & Mandy's Big Boogey Adventure.

Atoms is good friends with fellow animator Mr. Warburton, creator of Codename: Kids Next Door and C. H. Greenblatt, the creator of Chowder and Harvey Beaks and developer and executive producer of Jellystone!. He and Warburton have made multiple references to each other's shows and a half-hour crossover special, The Grim Adventures of the Kids Next Door. As for C. H., he voiced the character Fred Fredburger in several episodes of Billy & Mandy, alongside a brief cameo of Chowder in Underfist. Atoms was also an executive producer and voice actor of the Disney show Fish Hooks with Noah Z. Jones.

In 2012, Atoms begun developing a new project entitled Dead Meat, "an awesome black comedy/buddy action/puppet gore web series", which was still in production by January 2020 and had a successful Kickstarter campaign by November 15, 2013. In an interview in 2013, Atoms stated that the series would be posted somewhere on the internet once it is finished. In early 2014, Atoms stated that he hopes to get the series released in 2015. This fell through and, in early 2020, Atoms announced that the project is shelved indefinitely and all backers will be refunded due to expensive costs and contractual issues. (Note: Also see his posts on March 10, 2020, March 17, 2020, and June 15, 2020 for further confirmation of the project ending, along with the original post on Kickstarter.) In 2016, he began working on a new series called Bunnicula.

In 2019, he provided several additional voices for the adult animated web series Hazbin Hotel, as he met creator Vivienne Medrano during work on Dead Meat. In 2023, he served as a storyboard supervisor on The Patrick Star Show.

== Personal life ==
Atoms lives in Los Angeles. He has Asperger syndrome.

== Filmography ==
=== Television ===
Year	Title	Role	Notes
1996	The Twisted Tales of Felix the Cat	N/A	Character designer
1998–1999	Cow and Chicken	N/A	Props; Story; Storyboard artist
1998–1999	I Am Weasel	N/A	Props; Story; Storyboard artist
2000	Poochini	N/A	Storyboard artist Title card designer
2001–2003	Grim & Evil	Cod Commando; Jeff the Spider	Creator; Director; Writer and Storyboard artist Executive producer Character and Prop designer
2002–2003	Whatever Happened to... Robot Jones?	N/A	Layout artist
2003–2008	The Grim Adventures of Billy & Mandy	Jeff the Spider; Additional voices	Creator; Writer and storyboard artist Story; Executive producer Character and Prop Designer
2003–2004	Evil Con Carne	Cod Commando; Additional voices	Creator; Writer and Storyboard artist Story; Executive producer Character and Prop Designer
2008–2009	Chowder	Additional voices	Story; Storyboard artist
2010–2014	Fish Hooks	Additional voices	Story; Director; Supervising director Storyboard artist Writer; Executive producer
2016–2018	Bunnicula	N/A	Producer; Writer; Storyboard artist Director
2019	Teen Titans Go!	N/A	Credited as Adam Burton; Writer; Director; Storyboard artist
2021–2025	Jellystone!	N/A	Supervising producer Story by Storyboard artist Director
2023	The Patrick Star Show	N/A	Storyboard supervisor

=== Films ===
Year	Title	Role	Notes
1995	Billy & Mandy in: Trepanation of the Skull and You	Billy	Student film
2001	The Flintstones: On the Rocks	N/A	Character layout artist
2007	The Grim Adventures of the Kids Next Door	N/A	Creator
2007	Billy & Mandy's Big Boogey Adventure	I'll Cut You Guy; Pirate #2; Horrorbot; Burnt Skeleton Guard	Creator; Story; Writer; Storyboard artist Character designer
2007	Billy & Mandy: Wrath of the Spider Queen	Jeff the Spider; Mystery Announcer; Man	Creator; Story
2008	Underfist	Jeff the Spider	Creator; Story; Storyboard artist Art director Character designer
2020	Happy Halloween, Scooby-Doo!	N/A	Writer; Producer; Director
2021	Scooby-Doo! The Sword and the Scoob	N/A	Writer; Producer; Director

=== Video games ===
Year	Title	Role
2009	Cartoon Network Universe: FusionFall	Jeff the Spider

=== Internet ===
Year	Title	Role	Notes
2016	Cartoons VS Cancer	Himself	
2019	Hazbin Hotel	Thief, Top Hat Demon, additional voices	Pilot: "That's Entertainment"
2020	Helluva Boss	Ralphie, Jarold, Loo Loo, additional voices	In S1E1, "Murder Family"

== Awards ==
1. Special internship, Film Roman. University of the Arts. 1996.
2. Annie nomination (1998)- Outstanding Individual Achievement for Storyboarding in an Animated Television Production. Cow & Chicken "The Karate Chick".
3. Top Pick Cartoons (2001–02). TV Guide.
4. Comic-Con (2005, 2006 and 2007).
5. 34th Annual Daytime Emmy Awards, Children's Programming, 2007 – The Grim Adventures of Billy & Mandy
