= Drew Neumann =

American musician

Drew Neumann is an American musician and composer of film and television scores. He created the soundtrack of the science fiction animated series Æon Flux, and has composed music for many other shows, including The Wild Thornberrys, Bunnicula, The Grim Adventures of Billy & Mandy and Aaahh!!! Real Monsters. He studied film, animation, and composition at the California Institute of the Arts, where he graduated with a BFA (1982). He has been longtime friends with animator Peter Chung. He also assisted in the development of, and contributed sound patches and timbres to Moog Music's award-winning Animoog iPad app.
