= List of Chowder episodes =

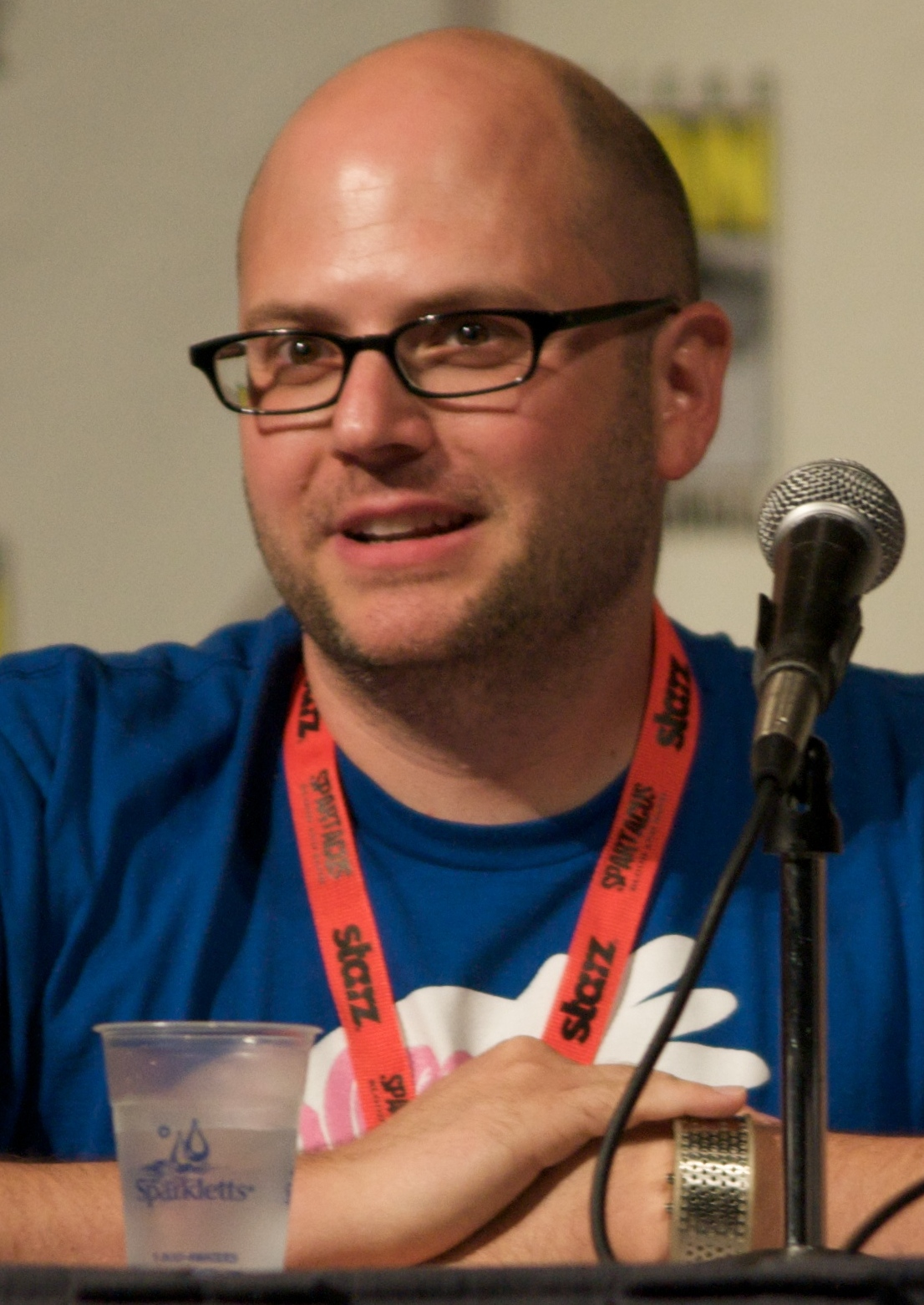
C. H. Greenblatt, shown here in 2009, created Chowder, which premiered on November 2, 2007.

Chowder is an American animated television series created by C. H. Greenblatt for Cartoon Network. The series centers on Chowder, an aspiring young boy who hopes to one day become a professional chef. Chowder is the apprentice of Mung Daal, Chowder's caretaker and seasoned professional chef, who lives with his wife, Truffles, in the bustling community of Marzipan City. Mung Daal's catering company also employs his assistant, Shnitzel, who speaks only by saying ‘’rada’’ repeatedly. The catering company's greatest rival is a business owned by the surreptitious Miss Endive and her junior apprentice, Panini. Panini has a remarkable romantic interest in Chowder despite his repeated attempts to explain that he is not interested in her. Throughout his journey, Chowder also interacts with Gazpacho, a middle-aged fruit salesman who often gives him advice, and his pet Kimchi, a gas cloud who speaks unintelligibly to Chowder.

Chowder ran for a total of 49 episodes (93 segments). The first season, which consists of 20 episodes, premiered on November 2, 2007, with "Burple Nurples/Shnitzel Makes a Deposit", and concluded on July 24, 2008, with "The Apprentice Games". Two more seasons were produced, with the series finale, "Chowder Grows Up", airing on August 7, 2010.

== Series overview ==
Season	Segments	Episodes	Originally released	
Season	Segments	Episodes	First released	Last released
1	38	20	November 2, 2007	July 24, 2008
2	38	20	October 2, 2008	October 8, 2009
3	17	9	October 15, 2009	August 7, 2010

== Episodes ==
=== Season 1 (2007–08) ===
No. overall	No. in season	Title	Directed by	Story by	Storyboarded by	Original release date	Prod. code
1a	1a	"Burple Nurples"	Juli Hashiguchi	C. H. Greenblatt and William Reiss	William Reiss	November 2, 2007	107a
When Chowder accidentally puts rat poison in a dish called Burple Nurples during his first attempt at cooking something by himself, Mung must stop him from selling the tainted treats.
1b	1b	"Shnitzel Makes a Deposit"	Kris Sherwood	C. H. Greenblatt	C. H. Greenblatt	November 2, 2007	107b
Shnitzel goes to deposit a paycheck at the bank, but Chowder (along with some other people) prevent him from doing so.
2a	2a	"The Froggy Apple; Crumple Thumpkin"	Juli Hashiguchi	C. H. Greenblatt	C. H. Greenblatt	November 2, 2007	101a
Chowder, Mung Daal, and Shnitzel make a "Froggy Apple Crumple Thumpkin" for a customer. They go through many dangerous steps to make it. The last one is to defeat it in a thumb wrestling match. Note: This is the pilot episode of Chowder.
2b	2b	"Chowder's Girlfriend"	Eddy Houchins	C. H. Greenblatt and William Reiss	William Reiss	November 2, 2007	101b
A girl named Panini has a crush on Chowder, and he attempts to convince her that he is not her boyfriend. Unfortunately for him, trying to do so only gets him kissed, at which point Gazpacho tells him that he must marry Panini (and needs to make an "honest woman" out of her).
3a	3a	"Grubble Gum"	Shaun Cashman	Danielle McCole, C. H. Greenblatt, and Tom King	Tom King	November 9, 2007	104a
When Chowder makes a big mistake of not sharing his gum with Truffles, his attempt to hide the mistake leads to a sticky mess of drastic proportions.
3b	3b	"The Cinnamini Monster"	Kris Sherwood	C. H. Greenblatt, Michele McCole Moss, and William Reiss	William Reiss	November 9, 2007	104b
When Chowder shrinks down in size and is then held captive in a tree that is home to a lonely monster, the others must beat the monster in a board game to set him free.
4a	4a	"Certifrycation Class"	Juli Hashiguchi	C. H. Greenblatt, Clayton Morrow, and Peter Browngardt	Clayton Morrow	November 16, 2007	103a
When Mung is forced to spend a day in Certifrycation School to renew his cooking license, Mung must decide whether to stay true to his instincts or swallow his pride to pass the class.
4b	4b	"Sing Beans"	Eddy Houchins	C. H. Greenblatt and Alex Almaguer	Alex Almaguer	November 16, 2007	103b
In order to cook Sing Beans, a musical food, Chowder, and the others must stay up during the night to watch the dish as it cooks. When Mung and Shnitzel fall asleep (due to Chowder telling an extremely boring joke in an attempt to pass the time), however, Chowder takes it upon himself to finish the process.
5a	5a	"The Wrong Address"	Eddy Houchins	C. H. Greenblatt and Alex Almaguer	Alex Almaguer	November 23, 2007	106a
Chowder and Mung go to an unfamiliar part of Marzipan City to deliver a customer's order, a sentient Roast Most, but the place is dirty and somewhat crime-infested, resulting in a dangerous event in which a large rat, who seems to have malicious purposes, chases them.
5b	5b	"The Wrong Customer"	Eddy Houchins	C. H. Greenblatt and Clayton Morrow	Clayton Morrow	November 23, 2007	106b
Set during the events of "The Wrong Address". While Chowder and Mung deliver the Roast Most, an unexpected outlaw (who seems to be blind and deaf) uses the catering company as a hideout, leaving Shnitzel to save Truffles' life. Truffles mistake the outlaw for a customer, though, and criticizes Shnitzel for seeming to be reluctant to serve him. The police are supposed to enter the building and arrest the outlaw but are too busy deciding who goes first.
6a	6a	"Mahjongg Night"	Shaun Cashman	C. H. Greenblatt	C. H. Greenblatt	November 30, 2007	105a
Chowder attempts to eat a dish called "Meviled Eggs" no matter what it takes, even if it means ruining Truffles' game night with her friends.
6b	6b	"Stinky Love"	Kris Sherwood	C. H. Greenblatt and Tom King	Tom King	November 30, 2007	105b
Mung makes a Clabbage Cobbler, which Kimchi falls in love with. To retrieve the dish, Chowder goes up to the top of a building Kimchi escaped to and keeps the stink cloud company during the night.
7a	7a	"The Thrice Cream Man"	Juli Hashiguchi	C. H. Greenblatt and Clayton Morrow	Clayton Morrow	December 7, 2007	102a
Mung tries to control Chowder's Thrice Cream obsession by creating a living Thrice Cream Man to keep Chowder company. However, when this plan works and Chowder becomes tired of the treat, the Thrice Cream Man goes into a deep rage.
7b	7b	"The Flibber-Flabber Diet"	Eddy Houchins	C. H. Greenblatt, Alex Almaguer, and William Reiss	Alex Almaguer and William Reiss	December 7, 2007	102b
When Truffles believes that everyone in the catering company is overweight, including her, she puts everyone on a strict diet of nothing but a disgusting food called Flibber Flabber, to the dismay of everyone (except Chowder, who surprisingly enjoys it).
8a	8a	"Gazpacho Stands Up"	Shaun Cashman	C. H. Greenblatt and Tom King	Tom King	December 14, 2007	108a
Gazpacho has a stand-up comedy gig coming up soon, but he has no material for it. He asks Chowder to write down his jokes in a book, but problems occur when Chowder's handwriting is illegible to everyone.
8b	8b	"A Taste of Marzipan"	Eddy Houchins	Kevin A. Kramer, C. H. Greenblatt, and Alex Almaguer	Alex Almaguer	December 14, 2007	108b
An all-out food fight ensues when Mung and his rival Miss Endive clash after they realize they have made the same dish for Marzipan City's annual street fair.
9a	9a	"The Puckerberry Overlords"	Juli Hashiguchi	Maxwell Atoms and C. H. Greenblatt	Maxwell Atoms	January 18, 2008	109a
Chowder eats an extremely sour piece of fruit and ends up having a bizarre journey within his mouth, with his wisdom tooth narrating the story.
9b	9b	"The Elemelons"	Kris Sherwood	Michele McCole Moss, C. H. Greenblatt, and William Reiss	William Reiss	January 18, 2008	109b
When Truffles' behavior causes giant fruits called Elemelons to go on strike, Mung forces her to solve the problem by staying in their cage for a night.
10a	10a	"Sniffleball"	Shaun Cashman	Danielle McCole, C. H. Greenblatt, and Clayton Morrow	Clayton Morrow	March 6, 2008	112a
Feeling that Chowder has been spending too much time in the kitchen, Mung forces him to play sports with other kids. Upset by Panini's kisses and Gorgonzola's taunts, Chowder has to figure out a way to escape the game and get back to the kitchen.
10b	10b	"Mung on the Rocks"	Eddy Houchins	Cindy Morrow, C. H. Greenblatt, and Tom King	Tom King	March 6, 2008	112b
After Mung forgets his and Truffles' wedding anniversary, Truffles gives him the cold shoulder. Seeing that Mung is depressed by this, Chowder decides to use advice from Gazpacho to help out.
11a	11a	"The Heavy Sleeper"	Juli Hashiguchi	C. H. Greenblatt	C. H. Greenblatt and Peter Browngardt	April 3, 2008	110a
When Chowder accidentally messes up a drink, Mung goes into a deep sleep, leaving Chowder and Shnitzel to find something to awaken the chef.
11b	11b	"The Moldy Touch"	Eddy Houchins	Cindy Morrow and C. H. Greenblatt	Cindy Morrow, C. H. Greenblatt, and Peter Browngardt	April 3, 2008	110b
After accidentally letting a mold creature out of its bottle, everything Chowder touches becomes covered in mold. After realizing what has happened, Mung tries to solve things before the entire city becomes moldy.
12a	12a	"At Your Service"	Kris Sherwood	Danielle McCole, C. H. Greenblatt, and William Reiss	William Reiss	May 1, 2008	111a
Mung and Chowder are forced to work for Miss Endive to receive a rare fruit from her.
12b	12b	"Chowder and Mr. Fugu"	Shaun Cashman	Danielle McCole, C. H. Greenblatt, and Tom King	Tom King	May 1, 2008	111b
Chowder must take a consumer on tour around Marzipan City with a balloon named Mr. Fugu, but to his dismay, Mr. Fugu can eat more than he does and does not get any of the food. Guest voices: George Takei as Foie Gras the Lucky Cat
13a	13a	"The Vacation"	Eddy Houchins	Kevin A. Kramer, C. H. Greenblatt, and Clayton Morrow	Clayton Morrow	June 5, 2008	113a
Chowder, Mung, and Shnitzel accidentally lock themselves in the bathroom when they are about to go on a vacation.
13b	13b	"The Sleep Eater"	Eddy Houchins	Danielle McCole, C. H. Greenblatt, and Peter Browngardt	Peter Browngardt	June 5, 2008	113b
After he has a midnight snack, Chowder's internal clock goes haywire and he becomes a monster at night. Chowder must now survive an entire night without eating anything to become normal again.
14a	14a	"The Bruised Bluenana"	Kris Sherwood	C. H. Greenblatt and William Reiss	William Reiss	June 12, 2008	114a
When Chowder accidentally bruises one of the bluenanas at Gazpacho's fruit stand, Panini gets the idea for her and Chowder to be its temporary parents and take care of it until it heals.
14b	14b	"Shnitzel and the Lead Farfel"	Eddy Houchins	C. H. Greenblatt and Tom King	Tom King	June 12, 2008	114b
After becoming soft and weak, Shnitzel must train to regain his strength and lift the heaviest object in Marzipan City: "The Lead Farfel".
15a	15a	"The Thousand Pound Cake"	Juli Hashiguchi	Phil Rynda, C. H. Greenblatt, and Peter Browngardt	Peter Browngardt	June 19, 2008	115a
Chowder and Shnitzel must race against the clock when delivering an order to a man that lives on top of a giant since he gets it free if it comes before sunset.
15b	15b	"The Rat Sandwich"	Shaun Cashman	Kevin A. Kramer, C. H. Greenblatt, and Clayton Morrow	Clayton Morrow	June 19, 2008	115b
The gang tries to get rid of Reuben, an annoying pig who is extorting the company by using his pet rat to get free food.
16a	16a	"Chowder Loses His Hat"	Kris Sherwood	Mike Bell and C. H. Greenblatt	Mike Bell, C. H. Greenblatt, and Phil Rynda	June 26, 2008	116a
When Chowder loses his hat to Chestnut, he must travel across town to trade the items needed to get it back.
16b	16b	"Brain Grub"	Eddy Houchins	Alex Almaguer, Danielle McCole, and C. H. Greenblatt	Alex Almaguer	June 26, 2008	116b
When Mung attempts to make Chowder smarter using a food called "Brain Grub", Chowder soon becomes aware that their universe is simply an animated series.
17	17	"Shnitzel Quits"	Eddy Houchins and Shaun Cashman	Kevin A. Kramer, C. H. Greenblatt, Mark Segurson, and Peter Browngardt	Mark Segurson and Peter Browngardt	July 3, 2008	119
When Shnitzel feels that he is not getting enough respect from Mung and Truffles, he quits the catering company and decides to work for Miss Endive. He soon discovers that she is actually in love with him, however, and sees him as more than hired help.
18a	18a	"The Broken Part"	Shaun Cashman	Danielle McCole, C. H. Greenblatt, and Peter Browngardt	Peter Browngardt	July 10, 2008	118a
When Chowder accidentally breaks Mung's new feet-making machine, he is forced to go and buy a new part for it, but Chowder becomes easily distracted while in town and ends up having to find a way to make money after wasting the money Mung gave him.
18b	18b	"The Meach Harvest"	Eddy Houchins	Pietro "Pappy" Piumetti, Brook Chalmers, and Tom King	Tom King	July 10, 2008	118b
When Mung has to make a dish that requires a certain fruit that he fears due to an experience with it, he sends Chowder and Shnitzel in his place to retrieve it.
19a	19a	"Banned from the Stand"	Juli Hashiguchi	Pietro "Pappy" Piumetti, Brook Chalmers, C. H. Greenblatt, and Tom King	Tom King	July 17, 2008	120a
Gazpacho bans everyone (including himself) from his fruit stand after a quarrel with Mung and must find a way to fix the problem he has caused.
19b	19b	"Créme Puff Hands"	Eddy Houchins	Danielle McCole, C. H. Greenblatt, Clayton Morrow, and William Reiss	Clayton Morrow and William Reiss	July 17, 2008	120b
When Chowder's hands inflate after a cooking accident, he suddenly becomes very helpful to the people of Marzipan City, but his hands soon become a liability when Chowder starts to go crazy, believing that he is useless without his huge hand.
20	20	"The Apprentice Games"	Juli Hashiguchi and Kris Sherwood	Danielle McCole, C. H. Greenblatt, William Reiss, and Clay Morrow	William Reiss, Clay Morrow, and Alex Almaguer	July 24, 2008	117
Chowder and Gorgonzola are forced to team-up for the Marzipan City Apprentice Games but are kicked out of the competition by their masters after they lose several events. The duo must now get back into the games to reclaim their dignity. Guest voices: Stephen Root as Stilton

=== Season 2 (2008–09) ===
No. overall	No. in season	Title	Directed by	Story by	Storyboarded by	Original release date	Prod. code
21a	1a	"The Arborians"	Kris Sherwood	C. H. Greenblatt, William Reiss, and Alex Almaguer	Alex Almaguer	October 2, 2008	201a
Mung, Chowder, and Shnitzel need a special syrup from an annoying tree to complete a pancake recipe, but soon the tree and his family end up taking over the catering company, leaving them to find a solution. Guest voices: Ron Perlman as Arbor
21b	1b	"The Garage Sale"	Majella Milne	Kevin A. Kramer, C. H. Greenblatt, and Peter Browngardt	Peter Browngardt	November 20, 2008	201b
Chowder starts eating his stuff sold at Mung's garage sale.
22a	2a	"Panini for President"	Juli Hashiguchi	William Reiss	William Reiss	November 6, 2008	202a
When Panini declares herself as the new president of the apprentice's society, Gorgonzola (through Chowder) ends up competing against her for the title.
22b	2b	"Chowder's Babysitter"	Kris Sherwood	Kristina Baranovich, C. H. Greenblatt, and Peter Browngardt	Peter Browngardt	November 6, 2008	202b
While babysitting Chowder, Gazpacho believes he has accidentally killed Chowder. Convincing Chowder that he's dead, they both attempt to get his "spirit" to pass on to the other side.
23a	3a	"The Fire Breather"	Eddy Houchins	Michele McCole Moss, C. H. Greenblatt, and Ian Wasseluk	Ian Wasseluk	November 13, 2008	203a
After Chowder eats a group of hot peppers to keep them from escaping the kitchen and burn down the city, he begins to breathe fire whenever he opens his mouth, whether he wants to or not. Quickly becoming an inconvenience to Mung and the others, he runs away to go live with dragons but returns at the end.
23b	3b	"The Flying Flinger Lingons"	Mike Milo	C. H. Greenblatt and Dave Smith	Dave Smith	November 13, 2008	203b
While helping Mung make a giant bread bowl for a traveling circus troupe, Chowder becomes obsessed with being a member of the Flying Flinger Lingons and runs away to join them.
24	4	"Hey, Hey It's Knishmas!"	Eddy Houchins and Mike Milo	Darrick Bachman, C. H. Greenblatt, William Reiss, and Alex Almaguer	William Reiss, Alex Almaguer, and C. H. Greenblatt	December 4, 2008	204
Chowder worries that he will not receive the gift he wants on Knishmas when he sees Mung attempt to make a perfect Schmingerbread house and fail several times. Upon seeing this, he recruits Panini and Gorgonzola to help him make Knish Kringle like Mung's house.
25a	5a	"Chowder's Catering Company"	Eddy Houchins	Michele McCole Moss, C. H. Greenblatt, and Ian Wasseluk	Ian Wasseluk	December 11, 2008	205a
Against Mung's wishes, Chowder secretly starts his own catering company for a bunch of trash-dwelling vermins. However, when these vermin attempt to kill Mung, Shnitzel, and Truffles to keep them out of the way, Chowder must choose between his friends and his dreams.
25b	5b	"The Catch Phrase"	Majella Milne	Danielle McCole, C. H. Greenblatt, and Brett Varon	Brett Varon	December 11, 2008	205b
When a celebrity chef takes Marzipan City by storm, and wins the admiration of Chowder from Mung, Mung must come up with a catchphrase to win back Chowder's adoration.
26a	6a	"The Hot Date"	Majella Milne	Darrick Bachman, C. H. Greenblatt, and Alex Almaguer	Alex Almaguer	February 12, 2009	206a
Sergent Hoagie prepares to go on a blind date, but must first deal with a crime committed at Miss Endive's swimming pool caused by herself. Note: Miss Bellum from The Powerpuff Girls makes a cameo at the end.
26b	6b	"Shopping Spree"	Kris Sherwood	Kevin A. Kramer, C. H. Greenblatt, and Peter Browngardt	Peter Browngardt	February 12, 2009	206b
When Truffles becomes sick, Mung, Chowder and Shnitzel are left in charge of the company's money box. However, they become tempted by the large amount of money and go on a huge shopping spree, leaving no money left in the box. The gang must now find a way to stop Truffles from noticing the missing money (as soon as they receive enough money to continue animating the show).
27a	7a	"The Party Cruise"	Eddy Houchins	Darrick Bachman, C. H. Greenblatt, Chris Reccardi, and William Reiss	Chris Reccardi and William Reiss	April 2, 2009	207a
Mung takes Chowder and Shnitzel to go fishing, but end up on a cruise ship falsely owned by Reuben.
27b	7b	"Won-Ton Bombs"	Mike Milo	Darrick Bachman, C. H. Greenblatt, and Brett Varon	Brett Varon	June 1, 2009	207b
When Mung's old cooking master comes to visit and tells a story about Mung's greatest failure to all of Marzipan City, humiliating him and turning everyone against him, Chowder and Mung travel back to the past to fix his failure. Guest voices: James Hong as Lo Mein
28a	8a	"The Big Hat Biddies"	Kris Sherwood	Darrick Bachman, C. H. Greenblatt, and Ian Wasseluk	Ian Wasseluk	June 2, 2009	208a
Truffles tries to impress the members of The Big Hat Biddies, and the others try to help by making a big feast for the club. Guest voices: Susan Blakeslee as Mrs. Butterscotch
28b	8b	"The Deadly Maze"	Majella Milne	Darrick Bachman, C. H. Greenblatt, and Peter Browngardt	Peter Browngardt	June 3, 2009	208b
Mung's old apprentice Gumbo traps Chowder within a huge maze so he can get rid of Mung but soon finds himself lost within it also, not knowing the way back. To make things worse, an over-professional Bird-headed body-builder named Jeffery, hired to destroy Chowder threatens Gumbo. Chowder and Gumbo must work together to defeat him and escape the maze. Guest voices: Richard Kind as Gumbo
29a	9a	"The B.L.T.'s"	Eddy Houchins	Michele McCole Moss, C. H. Greenblatt, and Alex Almaguer	Alex Almaguer	June 11, 2009	210a
When Chowder must pass the upcoming "Basic Learning Test" (B.L.T.'s) or he'll be left unable to cook anymore, Mung is forced to take matters into his own hands and attempt to stop the test.
29b	9b	"The Trouble with Truffles"	Mike Milo	Brett Varon	Brett Varon	June 11, 2009	210b
Truffles gets a new voice after Mung tells her that her old one scares customers away. However, her new voice is so relaxed and non-threatening, so Chowder, Mung, and Shnitzel no longer take her seriously, get carried away, and turn into feral primitive cavemen, leaving Truffles to decide between her new voice and her old one.
30	10	"The Dinner Theater"	Kris Sherwood and Eddy Houchins	Kevin A. Kramer, C. H. Greenblatt, and William Reiss	William Reiss	June 25, 2009	212
Mung's Catering Company has a mystery-themed theater show called "Who Dunit? T'was Not Me: A Victorian Romp Through The World of Barbershop Farce" to earn more money, but due to his stupidity, Chowder believes that the play is a series of real events and that Gazpacho will act out the play in real-life as Baron Von Bon-Bon and kill the others. Chowder is then forced to go to Gorgonzola and Ceviché's help to stop him.
31a	11a	"Kid Shnitzel"	Eddy Houchins	Kevin A. Kramer, C. H. Greenblatt, and Ian Wasseluk	Ian Wasseluk	June 4, 2009	209a
Shnitzel tires of his adult responsibilities and decides to act like a child, much to Mung's chagrin. Forcing Shnitzel's responsibilities on Chowder, Chowder then decides to act like a baby and Shnitzel follows suit, forcing Mung to send them to the baby pound only to be trapped by the Warden, Frau Broten.
31b	11b	"Gazpacho Fights Back"	Majella Milne	Darrick Bachman, C. H. Greenblatt, William Reiss, and Phil Rynda	C. H. Greenblatt, Alex Almaguer, William Reiss, and Phil Rynda	June 18, 2009	209b
When an intimidating woman bullies Gazpacho into giving her free produce, he and Chowder must think of a way to fight back, by going to the strongest person they know.
32a	12a	"Field Tournament Style Up and Down On the Ground Manja Flanja Blanja Banja Ishka Bibble Babble Flabble Doma Roma Floma Boma Jingle Jangle Every Angle Bricka Bracka Flacka Stacka Two Ton Rerun Free For All Big Ball"	Mike Milo	Darrick Bachman, C. H. Greenblatt, and Alex Almaguer	Alex Almaguer	July 2, 2009	211a
While catering at a special sports event, Truffles and Mung argue about the rules of the game, resulting in the two competing in the games. Note: Television listings tend to shorten the name as "Big Ball".
32b	12b	"The Brain Freeze"	Eddy Houchins	Darrick Bachman, C. H. Greenblatt, William Reiss, and Brett Varon	Brett Varon	July 9, 2009	211b
Chowder drinks a cool drink too fast, causing him to be frozen in a block of ice; to get back to the kitchen, Chowder must get the help of two flenguins to get the fur coat of Flazpacho, a flammoth.
33a	13a	"The Snail Car"	Majella Milne	Darrick Bachman, C. H. Greenblatt, and John Infantino	John Infantino	July 16, 2009	213a
Mung tries to get rid of the old car for a new car, but Chowder wants the old one back, so Mung and Chowder set up a race for their cars.
33b	13b	"The Lollistops"	Kris Sherwood	Darrick Bachman, C. H. Greenblatt, William Reiss, and Carl Faruolo	Carl Faruolo	July 23, 2009	213b
Chowder wrecks his teeth on purpose so he can go to his dentist, who gives out delicious "lollistops".
34a	14a	"Endive's Dirty Secret"	Eddy Houchins	Darrick Bachman, C. H. Greenblatt, William Reiss, and Ian Wasseluk	Ian Wasseluk	July 30, 2009	214a
Mung blackmails Miss Endive with an embarrassing picture of her to gain access to her pool, and before long, everyone else begins to follow his plan.
34b	14b	"Big Food"	Mike Milo	Darrick Bachman, Kristina Baranovich, C. H. Greenblatt, Peter Browngardt, and William Reiss	Peter Browngardt and William Reiss	July 30, 2009	214b
Mung, Chowder, and Shnitzel go on a camping trip, where Chowder attempts to prove to a stubborn Mung that the legendary Big Food exists. Guest voices: Candi Milo as Big Food
35a	15a	"Paint the Town"	Eddy Houchins	Kevin A. Kramer, C. H. Greenblatt, and Alex Almaguer	Alex Almaguer	August 6, 2009	215a
Fed up with Mung and everyone criticizing him for his screw-ups, Chowder paints his own world after discovering a blank-canvas dimension behind his bedroom.
35b	15b	"The Blackout"	Kris Sherwood	Kristina Baranovich and Peter Browngardt	Peter Browngardt	August 6, 2009	215b
When Chowder uses too much power in the kitchen, it causes a blackout to occur. To bring back the power, Chowder (along with Gorgonzola) must go to The Tower of Power.
36a	16a	"The Dice Cycle"	Mike Milo	Michele McCole Moss, C. H. Greenblatt, Darrick Bachman, William Reiss, and Mark O'Hare	Mark O'Hare	August 13, 2009	216a
Chowder breaks Mung's dice cycle and blames it on Ceviche under Gazpacho's command.
36b	16b	"The Chain Recipe"	Majella Milne	Darrick Bachman and Brett Varon	Brett Varon	August 13, 2009	216b
Mung becomes cursed for 100 years after refusing to make a chain recipe.
37a	17a	"The Garden"	Mike Milo	Darrick Bachman, C. H. Greenblatt, William Reiss, Lynne Naylor, and Ian Wasseluk	Ian Wasseluk	August 20, 2009	217a
After Truffles makes the plants grow with her voice, Chowder becomes her apprentice, but a heartbroken Mung attempts to get him back.
37b	17b	"Sheboodles"	Eddy Houchins	Darrick Bachman, C. H. Greenblatt, and William Reiss	William Reiss	August 20, 2009	217b
Longing for a companion, Miss Endive cooks a beefcake for a date. Unfortunately, she's impatient to bake him 100% completely and, as a result, gets stuck with an ugly and undercooked beefcake named Todd with a catchphrase, "Sheboodles!" Things get worse for Miss Endive once everyone starts to like Todd. Guest voices: Eddie Deezen as Todd
38a	18a	"Gazpacho Moves In"	Eddy Houchins	Michele McCole Moss, C. H. Greenblatt, Darrick Bachman, and Mark O'Hare	Mark O'Hare	August 27, 2009	218a
Gazpacho leaves his mom's home and moves into the catering company after an argument. Gazpacho gradually wears out his welcome and the catering company works out a plan to get rid of him.
38b	18b	"My Big Fat Stinky Wedding"	Kris Sherwood	Darrick Bachman, C. H. Greenblatt, Peter Browngardt, William Reiss, and Maxwell Atoms	Maxwell Atoms	September 3, 2009	218b
Chowder takes Kimchi to his family's home in the swamp for an arranged marriage and worries about the future of their friendship after Chowder is accused by Porridge of kidnapping Kimchi from his family. Guest voices: Jeremy Shada as Porridge
39a	19a	"Apprentice Appreciation Day"	Kris Sherwood	Michele McCole Moss, Darrick Bachman, C. H. Greenblatt, and Alex Almaguer	Alex Almaguer	September 10, 2009	219a
Mung and Miss Endive compete over who throws the best Apprentice Appreciation Day party, alienating Chowder and Panini in the process.
39b	19b	"The Grape Worm"	Mike Milo	Darrick Bachman, Kevin A. Kramer, C. H. Greenblatt, William Reiss, and Carl Faruolo	Carl Faruolo	September 17, 2009	219b
A parasite moves into Chowder's stomach, driving away Chowder's friends, so he attempts to remove it. Guest voices: Bobby Moynihan as Jam
40a	20a	"A Faire to Remember"	Majella Milne	Darrick Bachman, Kevin A. Kramer, C. H. Greenblatt, William Reiss, and Brett Varon	Brett Varon	September 24, 2009	220a
Chowder becomes friends with a girl named Marmalade, but Panini, very jealous about her boyfriend's new relationship, tries to get Chowder back. Guest voices: Mary Mouser as Marmalade
40b	20b	"Tofu-Town Showdown"	Eddy Houchins	Darrick Bachman, C. H. Greenblatt, and Ian Wasseluk	Ian Wasseluk	October 8, 2009	220b
Chowder discovers that Shnitzel had a previous life as a samurai bodyguard.

=== Season 3 (2009–10) ===
No. overall	No. in season	Title	Directed by	Story by	Storyboarded by	Original release date	Prod. code
41a	1a	"Hands on a Big Mixer"	Eddy Houchins	Darrick Bachman, C. H. Greenblatt, William Reiss, and Alex Almaguer	Alex Almaguer	October 15, 2009	301a
Chowder, Mung, Shnitzel and several recurring and minor characters enter a contest to win a big mixer. The last one with their hand on it wins.
41b	1b	"The Blast Raz"	Mike Milo	Kevin A. Kramer, C. H. Greenblatt, Darrick Bachman and Mark O'Hare	Mark O'Hare	November 5, 2009	301b
Mung, Shnitzel and Chowder agree to help deliver a bunch of explosive and dangerous Blast Raz to Mr. Fugu's house while having to put up with Chowder's crazed singing at the same time.
42a	2a	"The Spookiest House in Marzipan"	Eddy Houchins	Darrick Bachman, C. H. Greenblatt, William Reiss and Alex Almaguer	Alex Almaguer	October 22, 2009	302a
Chowder has to make a delivery to an old haunted house across the street.
42b	2b	"The Poultry Geist"	Mike Milo	Kevin A. Kramer, C. H. Greenblatt, Darrick Bachman and Ian Wasseluk	Ian Wasseluk	October 29, 2009	302b
A chicken ghost named Florentine takes over Chowder's body, causing problems for the gang.
43a	3a	"The Apprentice Scouts"	Majella Milne	Darrick Bachman, C. H. Greenblatt and William Reiss	C. H. Greenblatt and Blake Lemons	November 12, 2009	303a
Chowder, Panini, Gorgonzola and Ceviché go on a scouting trip led by Gazpacho, but Chowder thinks he has Rabie-C's since Gazpacho is going hard on them. Note: This is the only episode Mung Daal is absent in, making Chowder the only character to appear in every episode.
43b	3b	"The Belgian Waffle Slobber-Barker"	Kris Sherwood	Kevin A. Kramer, C. H. Greenblatt and Peter Browngardt	Peter Browngardt	November 19, 2009	303b
Mung creates a guard dog out of food to protect the catering company, but Chowder adds a crazy fruit that makes it incredibly dangerous.
44a	4a	"A Little Bit of Pizzazz!"	Eddy Houchins	Darrick Bachman, Kevin A. Kramer, C. H. Greenblatt, William Reiss and Brett Varon	Brett Varon	December 3, 2009	304a
A baking accident causes Chowder, Mung, Shnitzel and Truffles to switch bodies.
44b	4b	"The Birthday Suits"	Kris Sherwood	Kevin A. Kramer, C. H. Greenblatt, William Reiss and Craig McCracken	Craig McCracken and Vaughn Tada	December 10, 2009	304b
While trying to go to Mr. Fugu's fruit party, the gang's fruit costumes are destroyed. Now, they must try to get new ones before an angry mob and the police catch them.
45a	5a	"The Heist"	Majella Milne	C. H. Greenblatt, Kevin A. Kramer, William Reiss and Alex Almaguer	Alex Almaguer	January 7, 2010	305a
The gang finds a stash of rock candy called sugar sapphires under Miss Endive's house and try to raid the loot before she discovers.
45b	5b	"The Prank"	Eddy Houchins	Michele McCole Moss, C. H. Greenblatt and Dave Smith	Dave Smith	January 14, 2010	305b
Miss Endive feels guilty after playing a trick on Mung.
46a	6a	"Old Man Thyme"	Kris Sherwood	Kevin A. Kramer, C. H. Greenblatt, William Reiss and Brett Varon	Brett Varon	January 21, 2010	306a
When Chowder sees the terrible effects of old age on Mung and Truffles, Chowder tries to find a way to stop Old Man Thyme from making him old and ugly.
46b	6b	"Chowder's Magazine"	Mike Milo	Kevin A. Kramer, C. H. Greenblatt and Clayton Morrow	Clayton Morrow	January 28, 2010	306b
When Chowder's newspaper fails to sell, Chowder makes a new cover title known as the MIP (Most Important Person). Mung, Truffles and Shnitzel start vying over who gets the MIP title.
47a	7a	"Weekend at Shnitzel's"	Mike Milo	Kevin A. Kramer, C. H. Greenblatt, William Reiss and Alex Almaguer	Alex Almaguer	March 4, 2010	307a
Shnitzel has to watch Chowder over at his house while Mung and Truffles are out of town. When Chowder drags him to a parody of Chuck E. Cheese, Shnitzel falls in love with a singing animatronic. Pretty soon, his love goes too far and causes chaos. Guest voices: Grey DeLisle as Senorita Mesquite
47b	7b	"Taste Buds"	Majella Milne	Michele McCole Moss, C. H. Greenblatt and William Reiss	William Reiss	March 11, 2010	307b
Mung accidentally ruins his tongue which makes him unable to taste things, so he asks Chowder to be his "taste buds".
48a	8a	"Gazpacho!"	Eddy Houchins	C. H. Greenblatt, Kevin A. Kramer, William Reiss and Alex Almaguer	Alex Almaguer	March 18, 2010	308a
A ninja-hating friend of Gazpacho tries to help him find his mother, whom Gazpacho thinks has been captured by actual ninjas. Guest voices: Steven Blum as Limon
48b	8b	"The Toots"	Eddy Houchins	Kevin A. Kramer, C. H. Greenblatt, William Reiss and Ian Wasseluk	Ian Wasseluk and William Reiss	April 5, 2010	308b
Chowder accidentally eats a tootin' fruit and becomes a musical sensation, but his life is taken over by his agent, Gorgonzola. Soon he misses Mung and wants to go back with him.
49	9	"Chowder Grows Up"	Kris Sherwood and Majella Milne	Kevin A. Kramer, C. H. Greenblatt, William Reiss, Brett Varon and Ian Wasseluk	Brett Varon, Ian Wasseluk, William Reiss and C. H. Greenblatt	August 7, 2010	309
Mung tells Chowder that one day, he'll have to grow up and run the kitchen on his own once he becomes old enough. Chowder does not want to grow up and sings a song explaining why, but he keeps the song going for 20 years and grows up. He sees what all of his friends grew up to be and realizes that he should stop acting like a kid and find a new apprentice. Guest voices: Dave Wittenberg as Gorgonzola (adult)
