= List of Fish Hooks episodes =

Fish Hooks, a Disney Channel Original Series, premiered on September 3, 2010, and concluded on April 4, 2014, after airing a total of 110 episodes across three seasons.

== Series overview ==
Season	Segments	Episodes	Originally released	
Season	Segments	Episodes	First released	Last released
1	40	21	September 3, 2010	October 21, 2011
2	42	22	October 7, 2011	May 17, 2013
3	28	16	June 7, 2013	April 4, 2014

=== Season 1 (2010–11) ===
No. overall	No. in season	Title	Directed by	Written & storyboarded by	Story by	Original release date	Prod. code	U.S. viewers (millions)
1	1	"Bea Stays in the Picture"	Maxwell Atoms	Maxwell Atoms	Tim McKeon	September 3, 2010	101a	4.80
On the school's picture day, Bea, Milo and Oscar try to make their picture the best. While Oscar's photo turns out bad with the flash reflecting off his braces and Milo's turning out a little weird, Bea tries to make it perfect. When the photo is taken and Bea does not appreciate it, she and Milo infiltrate Clamantha's yearbook office while Oscar takes Clamantha on a date in order to keep her away from the yearbook office.
2	2	"Fish Sleepover Party"	William Reiss	William Reiss	Justin Roiland	September 24, 2010	102a	3.02
Bea has a girls-only sleepover and Milo and Oscar feel left out so they attend the party as Milovia and Oscarlinabeth. Shellsea and Bea allow them to join them, but they aren't fooled by their disguises, so they make them prove that they are girls.
3	3	"Fish Out of Water"	Maxwell Atoms	Alex Hirsch and Ian Wasseluk	Justin Roiland	September 24, 2010	101b	3.02
Milo panics when everyone believes he is selfish, so he decides to go out of the tank. He subsequently starts to lose oxygen, so Oscar and Bea go to save him. However, when a huge cat named Wilford comes to them, it is up to Milo to save Bea and Oscar, and to prove that he is not selfish.
4	4	"Doris Flores Gorgeous"	William Reiss	Derek Evanick	Jacqueline Buscarino	October 1, 2010	103a	3.95
When Bea goes on several dates and Milo goes on a date with Finberly, Oscar feels he is the only one without a girl so and pretends to have a girlfriend named Doris Flores Gorgeous, but he struggles to keep it a secret from Milo and Bea. He tells Milo and Bea that Doris lives in Fish Niagara Falls so the friends try to "cheer up" Oscar by taking him there. When they get there, there actually is Doris who turned out to be Clamantha. Guest star: Tiffany Thornton as Doris Flores Gorgeous
5	5	"Underwater Boy"	Maxwell Atoms	Alex Almaguer, Maxwell Atoms and William Reiss	Andy Rheingold	October 1, 2010	103b	3.95
Milo tries to follow his dream by playing on the Football team, but gets the job of Water Boy. He also doesn't realize the importance of his job, until the football team plays at the Gecko tank. Guest star: Dave Wittenberg as The Geckcoach
6	6	"Happy Birthfish, Jocktopus"	Maxwell Atoms	Derek Evanick	Jacqueline Buscarino	October 8, 2010	102b	N/A
When Jocktopus's birthday comes up, he warns every student in Freshwater High that if they don't bring a gift for him, they will get "pounded" by him. When shopping for a gift Oscar suggests getting him money, which results in Oscar himself being given as a gift by his friends who don't want to be pounded. Bea and Milo try to get him back. Guest star: Maile Flanagan as Sunny
7	7	"Bea Becomes an Adult Fish"	William Reiss	Niki Yang and William Reiss	Jacqueline Buscarino	October 15, 2010	104a	N/A
Bea decides to take a job at Fish Flakes, but soon misses her old carefree life, and the problem worsens because no one will let her quit. Meanwhile, Milo and Oscar get sent to daycare after being mistaken of being Bea's babies. Oscar dislikes the babies, but Milo wears a diaper and stays nearby. Guest star: Lauren Tom as Barb
8	8	"Doggonit"	Maxwell Atoms	Carl Faruolo	Tim McKeon	October 22, 2010	104b	N/A
Milo gets a dog named Murphy, but Oscar doesn't like him. Oscar ends up yelling at the dog, and as a result, the dog runs away. Now, Bea, Milo, and Oscar venture out of the tanks to get Murphy back.
9	9	"Queen Bea"	C.H. Greenblatt	Derek Evanick	Tim McKeon	October 29, 2010	106a	N/A
When the school homecoming dance is coming up, Bea wants to be chosen as Homecoming Queen. Unfortunately for her, her "embarrassing" parents have signed up to be chaperones, so Milo and Oscar help her plan a fake school dance to stop them from ruining Bea's chance at becoming queen. Guest star: Derek Evanick as the three Student Council
10	10	"Fail Fish"	Willam Reiss	Ian Wasseluk	Tim McKeon	November 5, 2010	105a	N/A
Bea and Oscar help Milo study for his final exam so he doesn't get held back a grade, like their old friend Kevin did. To do this, they must find Milo's un-traditional way of learning. Guest star: Jason Earles as Kevin
11	11	"Funny Fish"	C.H. Greenblatt	Clayton Morrow	Andy Rheingold	November 27, 2010	105b	N/A
Oscar seems to be the only one without a good sense of humor, so Milo and Bea tell Oscar to simply pretend that everything's funny. Unfortunately, he goes too far.
12	12	"Baldwin the Super Fish"	William Reiss	Carl Faruolo	Tim McKeon	December 3, 2010	106b	N/A
Oscar and Milo believe that their teacher Mr. Baldwin lives a double life as a comic book superhero named Captain Aquarium. Meanwhile, Bea has to do a news report for Dr. Frog and believes that the realization of Mr. Baldwin being Captain Aquarium will make a good story.
13	13	"Dances with Wolf Fish"	William Reiss	Niki Yang	Jacqueline Buscarino	December 10, 2010	107b	2.51
Milo and Oscar search for new roommates after they fight over Milo's messy habits. Bea attempts to get a new roommate for Oscar while Milo tries coping with the life of wolf-fish. After realizing their roommates are too extreme, Milo and Oscar apologize to each other.
14	14	"Hooray for Hamsterwood"	C.H. Greenblatt	Diana Lafyatis	Jacqueline Buscarino	December 17, 2010	108a	N/A
Milo, Oscar and Bea travel to Hamsterwood where Bea can have her own TV show. Unfortunately, things in Hamsterwood are not as wonderful as they seem to be, and when the hamsters are plan to eat Bea, Milo and Oscar must rescue her. Guest stars: Jason Alexander as Mr. Nibbles and Sabrina Bryan as Pamela Hamster
15	15	"The Tale of Sir Oscar Fish"	William Reiss	Ian Wasseluk	Tim McKeon	December 17, 2010	108b	N/A
Oscar hits his head on a sign on the way to school and wakes up in what he believes is his dream world. Meanwhile, Milo and Bea try to find Oscar, but runs into different kinds of fake Oscars. Guest stars: Eric Laden as Ron and Grey DeLisle as Baby Unicorn
16	16	"Milo Gets a Ninja"	C.H. Greenblatt	Alex Almaguer, Derek Evanick, and C.H. Greenblatt	Tim McKeon	January 7, 2011	107a	N/A
Milo finds a siamese fighting fish ninja and uses his skills to intimidate Jocktopus from bullying. However, the power quickly goes to Milo's head, and he begins to punish everyone by trapping them in glass bowls for ridiculous reasons. Guest star: Richard Horvitz as Ninja
17	17	"Dropsy!"	William Reiss	Ian Wasseluk and Neil Graf	Jackie Buscarino	January 21, 2011	109b	N/A
Milo fakes having a disease called "dropsy" when he sees Albert Glass having the illness. After realizing that he can get free things like Albert by pretending to be sick, Milo becomes very greedy, upsetting his brother Oscar. However, when Milo still pretends to be sick, he is taken to a tank with very sick fish. Then Milo sees Albert and the other fish having fun and reveals that he faked his illness; it is now too late, however, and no one cares about him. Guest star: Jeff Bennett as Seahorse and Sick Fish
18	18	"Fishing for Compliments: The Albert Glass Story"	C.H. Greenblatt	Carl Faruolo	Justin Roiland	January 29, 2011	109a	N/A
When Bea finds out that Albert Glass does not like her, she enlist Milo and Oscar to help her figure out what it takes to get on Albert's good side. Guest star: Chris Parnell as Announcer and Allibut
19	19	"Big Fish"	C.H. Greenblatt	Derek Evanick	Ryan Ridley	February 4, 2011	110a	N/A
When Milo is very weak in Bea's class, Coach Salmons tell him to exercise. Since Milo is lazy, he gets help from Jumbo Shrimp and uses a tank to make him stronger. He gets careless and gets bigger and stronger until he ends up turning into a monster.
20	20	"The Dark Side of the Fish"	William Reiss	Blake Lemons and William Reiss	Mr. Warburton	February 11, 2011	110b	N/A
When Oscar believes nobody understands him, he joins a group of goth fish and changes his name to Bubblethorn. Milo and Bea attempt to get Oscar back from Razor and the goth fish. Guest star: Ricky Gervais as The Goth Reaper & Eva Amurri as Bleak Molly
21	21	"Dollars and Fish"	C.H. Greenblatt and William Reiss	Neil Graf	Jackie Buscarino and Justin Roiland	February 18, 2011	111b	3.74
When Milo borrows money from Randy Pincherson to attend a concert, he soon learns that he must repay the loan before the night is over at a hefty interest rate.
22	22	"Fish Floaters"	C.H. Greenblatt and William Reiss	Diana Lafyatis	Jackie Buscarino and Justin Roiland	February 25, 2011	111a	N/A
When Principal Stickler says that the boys would build a float and the girls will build another, it later becomes a fight because Milo did not come up with a plan and plans one of the boys to spy on them. When the boys and the girls show their floats, it collapses and becomes a Principal Stickler float.
23	23	"Flying Fish"	C.H. Greenblatt and William Reiss	Carl Faruolo	Tim McKeon	March 4, 2011	112a	2.92
After Mr. Mussels gives an inspiring speech about going after your dreams, Milo ends up finding his dream in an actual dream: he wants to fly across the pet store. Bea and Oscar are certain that this is just a Milo moment, but realize he was serious after Milo decides to trap a bird to fly on. Guest star: George Takei as Bird
24	24	"Two Clams in Love"	C.H. Greenblatt and William Reiss	Alex Hirsch	Tim McKeon	March 11, 2011	114a	3.02
When Clamantha's crush on Oscar begins to overwhelm him, he thinks his problems are solved when she develops a crush on his laptop, mistaking it for a fellow clam. When the battery starts to die, Clamantha is upset that her new boyfriend is "ignoring" her and Oscar must find a way to make things right. Guest star: Smith Harrison as Webster
25	25	"Peopleing"	Maxwell Atoms	Maxwell Atoms	Justin Roiland	April 1, 2011	114b	2.37
Milo entertains holding onto Bud's ear with a fishing pole attached to the end of a plunger, but then shoots into the pocket of his shirt. Milo now runs the risk of becoming dehydrated. Guest star: Kevin Michael Richardson as Dave the Cave Fish
26	26	"Legend of the Earth Troll"	C.H. Greenblatt and William Reiss	Ian Wasseluk	Noah Z. Jones and Tim McKeon	April 8, 2011	112b	N/A
Oscar tries to get Milo involved in recycling, but Milo goes overboard when Oscar comes up with a "fake" story and tells Milo about a Magical Earth Troll. Guest star: Ozzy Osbourne as The Earth Troll
27	27	"Parasite Fright"	C.H. Greenblatt and William Reiss	William Reiss and Niki Yang	Jacqueline Buscarino and Justin Roiland	April 29, 2011	115b	2.23
Milo becomes paranoid after watching a horror movie. Guest star: Jim Cummings as Scientist #1 and #2
28	28	"Pamela Hamster Returns"	C.H. Greenblatt and William Reiss	Ian Wasseluk	Jacqueline Buscarino and Justin Roiland	May 13, 2011	115a	2.06
When Milo and Pamela Hamster do a video chat, Pamela decides to visit Milo. Excited, Milo drains all of the tanks and gets everyone else to go to a party called "Cinco de Milo" and almost gets arrested for draining of the tanks and the failure to throw an awesome party. Guest stars: Sabrina Bryan as Pamela Hamster, Jerry O'Connell as Sterling Hamsterton and Jason Alexander as Mr. Nibbles
29	29	"Riding in Cars with Fish"	C.H. Greenblatt and William Reiss	Derek Evanick	Tim McKeon	June 18, 2011	116a	N/A
Oscar takes his driving test, but things get wild when his driving instructors turn out to be Mr. Mussels and Coach Salmons.
30	30	"Milo's Big Idea"	C.H. Greenblatt and William Reiss	Neil Graf	Jacqueline Buscarino	June 18, 2011	116b	N/A
Milo comes up with a great idea, fridge hats, but when Randy mysteriously starts selling fridge hats and claiming he came up with the idea, Milo and the others must figure out how Randy knows of the idea and how to expose him.
31	31	"Mascotastrophe"	C.H. Greenblatt and William Reiss	Carl Faruolo	Jacqueline Buscarino and Justin Roiland	June 24, 2011	118b	3.10
Milo and Oscar dress as the school's mascot, but when the fame-happy Milo exposes them, not only does he embarrass Oscar, but players from a rival school kidnap Oscar to destroy Freshwater High's moral for the championship.
32	32	"Good Morning, Freshwater"	C.H. Greenblatt and William Reiss	Diana Lafyatis	Tim McKeon	July 2, 2011	117a	N/A
Oscar bores everyone in Freshwater High School with his morning announcements, so Bea helps make the show more entertaining, but Oscar realizes that she no longer focuses the morning announcements on school and decides to quit. The end reveals that he didn't get his chance to announce the cafeteria being closed for repairs.
33	33	"Diary of a Lost Fish"	C.H. Greenblatt and William Reiss	Ian Wasseluk	Jacqueline Buscarino	July 2, 2011 (Note: This episode first premiered on June 26, 2011 in Canada.)	117b	N/A
Randy Pincherson steals Bea's diary and blackmails her to go on a date with him. In order to get her diary back, she goes on a date with Randy. However, Milo and Oscar attempt to take Bea's diary back, but end up stealing Randy's diary.
34	34	"We've Got Fish Spirit" (Note: This episode is a half-hour special.)	C.H. Greenblatt and William Reiss	Derek Evanick and Diana Lafyatis	Meghan McCarthy	July 8, 2011 (Note: This episode first premiered on May 21, 2011 in Poland.)	113	2.98
Oscar discovers his college dreams and aspirations have been threatened by his lack in extracurricular activities, so Bea and Milo try to find him the perfect club. They find Clamantha fighting with her arch-nemesis, Clamanda, and Milo, Oscar, and Bea's friends join Clamantha's cheerleading team after her team gets brought by humans. Bea turns out to be in Jumbo Shrimp and Albert Glass' map club, so she is unable to help out the team. Guest star: Busy Philipps as Clamanda
35	35	"Run, Oscar, Run"	C.H. Greenblatt and William Reiss	Blake Lemons	Jessica Gao	August 12, 2011	118a	3.45
Oscar is being honored with an award for perfect attendance, but Bea and Milo get themselves into a predicament, preventing Oscar from being there. Oscar is determined to make it back on time and get his award. Guest star: Daran Norris as the Mayor
36	36	"Good Times at Pupu Goodtimes"	C.H. Greenblatt and William Reiss	Derek Evanick	Tim McKeon	August 19, 2011	119a	3.34
The class is on a field trip to PuPu Goodtimes Amusement Park, and Bea, Milo, and Oscar all have individual goals in mind. Bea is determined to get on a ride with Steve Jackson, Milo is embroiled in a "macho man ride-off" with Randy Pincherson, and Oscar joins forces with Jumbo Shrimp and Albert Glass to win a Galactic Fish Battles Limited Edition Fork Saber. Guest star: Jeff Bennett as Humble Harry
37	37	"Oscar Makes an Impression"	Mr. Warburton	Mr. Warburton	Justin Roiland	August 26, 2011	119b	3.15
Oscar's impression of the Queen of Fish England is so similar that even Mr. Mussels, who is a big admirer of the Queen, can't tell the difference between her and Oscar. The gang goes along with the ruse, until Oscar is mistaken for the Queen by a bridal party and swept away to "his" royal wedding. Then, the day escalates into a "Slow Jams Rap Battle" between Milo and Mr. Mussels to win the hand of the fair Oscar. Guest star: Jane Carr as Lady Ipswitch/Queen of Fish England
38	38	"Fish School Musical"	C.H. Greenblatt and William Reiss	William Reiss, C.H. Greenblatt, Derek Evanick, Diana Lafyatis, Blake Lemons, and Neil Graf	William Reiss, C.H. Greenblatt, Derek Evanick, Diana Lafyatis, Blake Lemons, and Neil Graf	September 23, 2011 (Note: This episode first premiered on September 16, 2011 in the United Kingdom and Ireland.)	121	2.54
Jocktopus reveals that it is his father's dream for Jocktopus to sing in a musical play about potatoes. Therefore, during the Freshwater High musical play, "Potatoes For Winter," he goes in the play to sing, but later gets nervous.
39	39	"Employee Discount"	C.H. Greenblatt and William Reiss	Diana Lafyatis	Meghan McCarthy	September 30, 2011	120b	3.30
After Milo and Oscar accidentally rip Bea's new red dress for the school dance, they find another copy of the dress, but are surprised because it costs 1,000 fish dollars. To raise the money to buy the dress, they get jobs at the store so that they can use their salaries to buy it.
40	40	"Fish Talent Show"	C.H. Greenblatt and William Reiss	C. H. Greenblatt, William Reiss, Blake Lemons, and Neil Graf	Tim McKeon	October 21, 2011	120a	2.74
The talent show is coming to Freshwater and Bea is determined to win. However, the talent show turns into a battle when Clamantha and Shellsea get into a fight when Clamantha gets kicked in the face by Shellsea's inflatable legs, splitting the school into two teams, Team Clamantha, and Team Shellsea.

=== Season 2 (2011–13) ===
No. overall	No. in season	Title	Directed by	Written & storyboarded by	Story by	Original release date	Prod. code	U.S. viewers (millions)
41	1	"Halloween Haul"	C.H. Greenblatt and William Reiss	Darin McGowan	Nick Confalone, Neal Dusedau, Meghan McCarthy, and Tim McKeon	October 7, 2011	203a	2.60
Halloween comes to Freshwater, and the gang is eager to get a lot of candy. Unfortunately, Jocktopus is beating trick-or-treaters up and stealing their candy. To get their sweets and not get beaten up by Jocktopus, they journey outside the tanks to trick-or-treat.
42	2	"Bea's Commercial"	C.H. Greenblatt and William Reiss	Ian Wasseluk	Nick Confalone, Neal Dusedau, Meghan McCarthy, and Tim McKeon	November 4, 2011	201a	3.32
When Bea has an audition that requires her to ride a scorpion, she lies about her riding qualifications and says she is an expert. However, when she actually tries to ride one, she finds it hard to stay on. The second time she tries it, she uses glue to keep her on the scorpion, but when Milo startles it with the sneeze-and-toot, it goes crazy and Bea tries to calm the scorpion down.
43	3	"Hairanoid"	C.H. Greenblatt and William Reiss	Derek Evanick	Tim McKeon	November 4, 2011	201b	3.32
When Milo, Oscar, Albert Glass, and Jumbo Shrimp stumble on the thing that makes Steve Jackson so popular—his hair gel, they use it to become cool. They eventually go insane trying to use the last of it to become popular for eternity, however.
44	4	"Adventures in Fish Sitting"	C.H. Greenblatt and William Reiss	Diana Lafyatis	Diana Lafyatis	November 18, 2011	202a	2.82
Bea, Oscar and Milo get a job babysitting Ms. Lips' cat, Attila, but things go wrong when he escapes. Guest star: Dee Bradley Baker as Attila
45	5	"Banned Band"	C.H. Greenblatt and William Reiss	Derek Evanick	Nick Confalone, Neal Dusedau, Meghan McCarthy, and Tim McKeon	November 25, 2011	202b	2.19
After being rejected by the band leader, Milo makes his own band. When multiple students reveal that they weren't being allowed to play music, Milo gives them payback. This cause the school band leader challenges him to the Battle of the Bands, where the losing band is banned from playing music ever again. Guest star: Doug Brochu as Lonnie the Band Leader
46	6	"Merry Fishmas, Milo"	C.H. Greenblatt and William Reiss	Sherm Cohen, C.H. Greenblatt, Carson Kugler, and William Reiss	Nick Confalone, Neal Dusedau, Meghan McCarthy, and Tim McKeon	December 9, 2011	207a	N/A
Milo and Oscar send a holiday request to Fish Santa when they need help throwing a Christmas party. Guest star: Bobcat Goldthwait as Fish Santa
47	7	"Milo on the Lam"	C.H. Greenblatt and William Reiss	Neil Graf and Blake Lemons	Nick Confalone, Neal Dusedau, Meghan McCarthy, and Tim McKeon	January 6, 2012 (Note: This episode first premiered on November 5, 2011 in the United Kingdom and Ireland.)	203b	4.38
When Milo is blamed for gluing Mr. Baldwin to his chair, he goes on the run to prevent him from serving detention.
48	8	"Break Up Shake Down"	C.H. Greenblatt and William Reiss	Derek Evanick	Nick Confalone, Neal Dusedau, Meghan McCarthy, and Tim McKeon	January 6, 2012	204b	4.38
Piranhica and Jocktopus break up and begin terrorizing the school individually. Now, it's up to the gang to heal the broken relationship.
49	9	"Just One of the Fish"	C.H. Greenblatt and William Reiss	Ian Wasseluk	Nick Confalone, Neal Dusedau, Meghan McCarthy, and Tim McKeon	January 20, 2012	207b	2.30
When Jocktopus' arms get severed in a football game, Bea volunteers to be the replacement quarterback while his limbs grow back. Coach Salmons rejects her, however, saying she'll get injured, but a strangely familiar person named Hank shows up as a new student the next day. Bea then tries to get Hank to reveal his true identity and, at the same time, she has trouble playing football.
50	10	"Rock Lobster Yeti"	C.H. Greenblatt and William Reiss	Derek Evanick	Derek Evanick, Diana Lafyatis, and Tim McKeon	January 27, 2012	206a	2.58
Freshwater High goes on a camping trip, and when Milo tells the story about the Rock Lobster Yeti, the class dismisses it as a legend. However, when the real Yeti Lobster shows up, the panicking students realize the folklore about the Yeti Lobster was true, though Milo was left behind and encountered by the Yeti Lobster. The Yeti Lobster turned out to not be as scary as Milo imagined once he got to know him, though the class still thought the Yeti Lobster attacked Milo.
51	11	"Spoiler Alert"	C.H. Greenblatt and William Reiss	David Shair, Neil Graf, Blake Lemons, and Ian Wasseluk	Nick Confalone, Neal Dusedau, Meghan McCarthy, and Tim McKeon	January 27, 2012	206b	2.58
Randy Pincherson spoils the ending to a movie that the gang wanted to see. To retaliate, they devise a plan to do the same thing to Randy with a film he wants to see.
52	12	"Bea Dates Milo"	C.H. Greenblatt and William Reiss	Diana Lafyatis	Nick Confalone, Neal Dusedau, Meghan McCarthy, and Tim McKeon	February 10, 2012	204a	2.24
Pamela Hamster breaks up with Milo and Bea tries to cheer him up. Milo, however, takes her interest to mean that Bea is falling in love with him.
53	13	"Oscar's Secret Admirer"	C.H. Greenblatt and William Reiss	Neil Graf, Blake Lemons, and Ian Wasseluk	Darrick Bachman	February 10, 2012	205a	2.24
Milo's love letter for his "Dream Fish" ends up in the hands of Oscar. Now, he has to find a date for Oscar in order to keep from making him mad.
54	14	"Sixteen Clamandles"	C.H. Greenblatt and William Reiss	Carl Faruolo	Nick Confalone, Neal Dusedau, Meghan McCarthy, and Tim McKeon	February 24, 2012	205b	2.87
Clamantha's Sweet 16 is today, and no one remembered. Now the gang must throw a party for her before the end of the day. "Sixteen Clamandles" is a parody of the movie Sixteen Candles, and this episode references 16 Candles (song).
55	15	"Send Me an Angel Fish"	C.H. Greenblatt and William Reiss	Maxwell Atoms, C.H. Greenblatt, and William Reiss	Nick Confalone, Neal Dusedau, Meghan McCarthy, and Tim McKeon	March 2, 2012	208a	2.41
Oscar develops a crush on Angela, the head of Freshwater High's rival debate team. However, Oscar later grows suspicious, believing that Angela is spying on him to win the "Big Pros and Cons of Video Games" debate. Guest star: Felicia Day as Angela
56	16	"Science Fair Detective Mystery"	C.H. Greenblatt and William Reiss	Written by : Neal Dusedau; Storyboarded by : Joe Johnston	Nick Confalone and Neal Dusedau	April 13, 2012	214a	3.01
When a thief steals Oscar's prize-winning Science Fair project, Bea and Milo flex their detective skills and scour the Freshwater halls for clues and suspects to crack the case of Oscar's missing creation.
57	17	"Guys' Night Out"	C.H. Greenblatt and William Reiss	Ian Wasseluk	Nick Confalone, Neal Dusedau, Meghan McCarthy, and Tim McKeon	April 27, 2012	213a	2.67
Today's the day of their one month anniversary, and Oscar decides to make it official with Angela by asking her to go steady. However, the boys convince him that when a girl becomes your girlfriend, everything changes, so Milo declares "Guys' Night Out". Guest star: Wallace Shawn as Rat King
58	18	"Bea Sneaks Out"	C.H. Greenblatt and William Reiss	Derek Evanick and Diana Lafyatis	Nick Confalone, Neal Dusedau, Meghan McCarthy, and Tim McKeon	May 11, 2012	209a	2.59
Bea and the girls get invited to a super-cool ferret party, but when her parents tell her she's not allowed to go, she sneaks out. As the night goes on, the ferrets turn out to be not as cool as they thought, and when things start to get out of hand, Bea calls her parents to the rescue. After Bea apologizes to her parents for sneaking out and lying, they happily forgive her as they were relive that she was okay and proud of her for calling them for help. However, Bea still gets grounded by her parents for sneaking out and lying. Guest star: Jason Mewes as Jason
59	19	"Busy Bea: Rise of the Machines"	C.H. Greenblatt and William Reiss	Ian Wasseluk	Nick Confalone, Neal Dusedau, Meghan McCarthy, and Tim McKeon	May 11, 2012	210a	2.59
Bea breaks her fin and is convinced that her life is over since she can't participate in any of her school activities. Randy Pincherson offers Bea a suitable solution, but it comes with a catch.
60	20	"So-fish-ticated"	C.H. Greenblatt and William Reiss	Neil Graf	Nick Confalone, Neal Dusedau, Meghan McCarthy, and Tim McKeon	June 1, 2012	211a	2.42
Bea and Milo try to help Oscar pick out a tie, but when Milo is banned from the store because of his ice cream-stained shirt, he enlists his friends to teach him how to become sophisticated.
61	21	"Milo and Oscar Move In"	C.H. Greenblatt and William Reiss	Derek Evanick and Diana Lafyatis	Nick Confalone, Neal Dusedau, Meghan McCarthy, and Tim McKeon	June 8, 2012	211b	3.02
After their water filter breaks, Bea invites Milo and Oscar to move in with her. However, the boys quickly wear out their welcome and rather than offend her best fish friends, Bea resorts to drastic measures to get them out.
62	22	"Oscar is a Playa"	C.H. Greenblatt and William Reiss	Ian Wasseluk	Maxwell Atoms, C.H. Greenblatt, William Reiss and Ian Wasseluk	June 22, 2012	216a	3.45
After Oscar gives off the wrong impression to Esmargot, the girls become convinced that he is cheating on Angela and set up a sting operation to catch him in the act. However, when their plan backfires, they must find a way to save his relationship before Angela loses it.
63	23	"Little Fish Sunshine"	C.H. Greenblatt and William Reiss	Derek Evanick and Diana Lafyatis	Derek Evanick and Diana Lafyatis	July 6, 2012	208b	2.79
After Bea and the girls enter the Little Fish Sunshine pageant in order to meet pop sensation Brandon Bubbler, Milo offers to put his baby pageant experience to good use and coach Bea to victory.
64	24	"All Fins on Deck"	C.H. Greenblatt and William Reiss	Written by : Tim McKeon; Storyboarded by : Carson Kugler	David Teitelbaum	July 13, 2012	212a	3.37
Bea and Oscar plan the cruise of a lifetime, but what starts out as a morning of merrymaking quickly turns into a swashbuckling adventure with Milo at the helm as he and his brigade of buccaneers set out to reclaim their ship from the Geckos and save their vacation.
65	25	"Cattlefish, Ho!"	C.H. Greenblatt and William Reiss	Blake Lemons	Nick Confalone, Neal Dusedau, Meghan McCarthy, and Tim McKeon	July 13, 2012	212b	3.37
Milo is convinced that he is a true cowboy when Bo Gregory enlists him and his friends to drive cattle fish over to his Uncle's ranch, but when his enthusiasm seems to do more harm than good and the cattle fish go on a stampede and plunge out of the tanks, Milo must prove his worth and save the day.
66	26	"Brothers' Day"	C.H. Greenblatt and William Reiss	Derek Evanick and Diana Lafyatis	Nick Confalone, Neal Dusedau, Meghan McCarthy, and Tim McKeon	July 20, 2012	210b	2.97
After seeing the Joe brothers get into a huge fight, Milo gets nervous that one day, that might happen to him and Oscar, so he creates a holiday dedicated to celebrating their friendship. Meanwhile, Bea gets detention, and Oscar tells Bea about Milo getting out of control. Mr. Baldwin then extends Bea's detention each time.
67	27	"Unfinished Doll Business"	C.H. Greenblatt and William Reiss	Carl Faruolo	Nick Confalone, Neal Dusedau, Meghan McCarthy, and Tim McKeon	August 11, 2012 (Note: This episode aired at a special time of 2:15 am/1:15am central. The episode premiered in its regular time slot, alongside "Chicks Dig Vampires", on October 5, 2012.)	209b	N/A
When Bea's childhood doll resurfaces, Bea realizes how creepy the doll really is and tries to paws it off on Milo and Oscar. To make things even worse, no matter what she does to try and rid herself of the doll, it keeps magically reappearing and haunting her.
68	28	"Milo's Magical Shake"	C.H. Greenblatt and William Reiss	Derek Evanick and Diana Lafyatis	Nick Confalone, Neal Dusedau, Meghan McCarthy, and Tim McKeon	September 7, 2012	213b	3.03
When Milo gets a free milkshake, he wants the excitement and the drink to last forever, but Bea and Oscar are forced to intervene after Milo names the milkshake Emily and insists on spending quality time with it.
69	29	"Spiders Bite"	C.H. Greenblatt and William Reiss	Joe Johnston	Nick Confalone, Neal Dusedau, Meghan McCarthy, and Tim McKeon	September 14, 2012	217b	2.43
Tonight's game night at Milo and Oscar's tank, but when a noisy gang of spiders move in next door, the fish have to find a way to quiet them down before their evening is ruined. Guest star: Ed O'Neill as Riff
70	30	"Principal Bea"	C.H. Greenblatt and William Reiss	Joe Johnston	Maxwell Atoms, C.H. Greenblatt, Joe Johnston, Noah Z. Jones, and William Reiss	September 21, 2012	219	2.46
After Principal Stickler goes missing, Bea takes over as school principal. However, some of her new policies upset Nurse Fishington, who encourages Bea to play by her rules. Fishington is revealed to be a robot that Stickler built so he wouldn't have to do his job. Now Bea has to save the school or Stickler's job will be ruined forever.
71	31	"Fish at Work"	C.H. Greenblatt and William Reiss	Blake Lemons	Nick Confalone, Neal Dusedau, Meghan McCarthy, and Tim McKeon	September 28, 2012	214b	2.33
Bea gets a job promotion; however, her excitement is short-lived after she discovers her first responsibility is to let one of her co-workers go. The problem worsens because Milo and Oscar are her co workers. After putting each employee through a series of tests, she ultimately decides the best thing to do is find them all new jobs.
72	32	"Chicks Dig Vampires"	C.H. Greenblatt and William Reiss	Neil Graf	Maxwell Atoms, Neil Graf, C.H. Greenblatt, and William Reiss	October 5, 2012	216b	2.94
Albert has a crush on Esmargot and comes up with a plan to act and live like a vampire to win her affections. Unbeknownst to Albert, however, Esmargot is a secret vampire slayer set out to rid the world of all vampires.
73	33	"Fish Lips Sink Ships"	C.H. Greenblatt and William Reiss	Derek Evanick and Diana Lafyatis	Nick Confalone, Neal Dusedau, Meghan McCarthy, and Tim McKeon	October 26, 2012	215a	2.37
Milo finds out that Mr. Baldwin is in love with Miss Lips, and after Mr. Baldwin swears him to secrecy, he ends up blabbing it to Bea and Oscar, not knowing Bea would do anything to get them to date.
74	34	"Bea's Birthday Surprise"	C.H. Greenblatt and William Reiss	Derek Evanick and Diana Lafyatis	Maxwell Atoms, Derek Evanick, C.H. Greenblatt, Noah Z. Jones, Diana Lafyatis, and William Reiss	November 9, 2012	215b	2.58
After Milo forgets Bea's birthday again, he promises her that he will get Bea a lock of Brandon Bubbler's hair. The only problem is that he can't, so he enlists the help of Oscar, Jumbo Shrimp and Albert to get it under the guise of four maids at his hotel. Milo accidentally ends up kidnapping Brandon in the process.
75	35	"Get a Yob!"	C.H. Greenblatt and William Reiss	Ian Wasseluk	Maxwell Atoms, C.H. Greenblatt, Noah Z. Jones, William Reiss, and Ian Wasseluk	November 9, 2012	217a	2.58
Milo gets a brilliant idea to put hair in his food to get a free lunch, but his prank goes too far and causes the lunch lady to get fired.
76	36	"Fuddy Duddy Study Buddy"	C.H. Greenblatt and William Reiss	Derek Evanick and Diana Lafyatis	Nick Confalone, Neal Dusedau, Meghan McCarthy, and Tim McKeon	November 30, 2012	218a	2.11
Oscar and Shellsea need to work on a project and disagree on how things should be done.
77	37	"Fish Flakes"	C.H. Greenblatt and William Reiss	Maxwell Atoms, Carl Faruolo, and Ian Wasseluk	Maxwell Atoms, C.H. Greenblatt, Noah Z. Jones, and William Reiss	January 11, 2013	218b	2.88
Milo begins to freak out when he realizes that his chances at becoming "Freshwater's" Catch of the Month Calendar Cover Dude" are weakening when his scales begin to fall off, so he tries to find a solution to his flaky problem and learns in the process that he's not the only one with body issues.
78	38	"Super Extreme Grandma Games to the Max"	C.H. Greenblatt and William Reiss	Neil Graf, Joe Johnston, Blake Lemons, and Ian Wasseluk	Nick Confalone, Neal Dusedau, Meghan McCarthy, and Tim McKeon	January 18, 2013	220b	2.56
Milo supports his bingo buddies at the Grandma games.
79	39	"Koi Story"	C.H. Greenblatt and William Reiss	Blake Lemons	Maxwell Atoms, C.H. Greenblatt, Noah Z. Jones, Blake Lemons, and William Reiss	February 15, 2013	220a	2.88
When Koi feels pressure to fit in, she lies to the girls that she did something daring, without realizing the negative effects it can have on her social life in the long run.
80	40	"See Bea Ski"	C.H. Greenblatt and William Reiss	Joseph Johnston	Maxwell Atoms, Darrick Bachman, C.H. Greenblatt, Joseph Johnston, Noah Z. Jones, Craig Lewis, and William Reiss	April 26, 2013	222a	2.04
Bea is challenged to a ski-off.
81	41	"Night at the Loxbury"	C.H. Greenblatt and William Reiss	Audie Harrison and William Reiss	Maxwell Atoms, Darrick Bachman, C.H. Greenblatt, and William Reiss	April 26, 2013	222b	2.04
The fish want to party at the loxbury party place, but they are too young, so they use the empty space in the fish diner to use for their party.
82	42	"Fish Prom"	C.H. Greenblatt and William Reiss	Derek Evanick and Diana Lafyatis	Maxwell Atoms, Derek Evanick, C.H. Greenblatt, Noah Z. Jones, Diana Lafyatis, and William Reiss	May 17, 2013	221	2.41
With the fish prom coming up, everyone at school obsesses over it, except for Angela, Oscar's girlfriend, who prefers to play video games. Oscar wonders if Bea is really the right girl for him. Meanwhile, Bea goes with Steve Jackson, but he is accidentally locked in a closet.

=== Season 3 (2013–14) ===
No. overall	No. in season	Title	Directed by	Written & storyboarded by	Story by	Original release date	Prod. code	U.S. viewers (millions)
83	1	"Milo vs. Milo"	C. H. Greenblatt and William Reiss	Neil Graf and Ian Wasseluk	Maxwell Atoms, Darrick Bachman, C. H. Greenblatt, Noah Z. Jones, and William Reiss	June 7, 2013	301a	2.87
Milo is convinced that a new hamster TV show called “The Milo Show” is about him, but when the Milo character turns out to be a klutzy nerd, he heads to Hamsterwood to clear his name.
84	2	"Everything but the Chicken Sink"	C. H. Greenblatt and William Reiss	Dominic Bisignano	Maxwell Atoms, Darrick Bachman, C. H. Greenblatt, Noah Z. Jones, Craig Lewis, and William Reiss	June 7, 2013	301b	2.87
When a wealthy chicken hires Bea to give swimming lessons to his difficult teenage daughter, she soon finds that the task is much harder than it looks.
85	3	"Live at the Hamsterwood Bowl"	C. H. Greenblatt and William Reiss	Tyler Chen	Maxwell Atoms, Darrick Bachman, C.H. Greenblatt, Noah Z. Jones, and Craig Lewis	June 21, 2013	304a	2.65
Oscar's dream date with Bea is threatened when their friends tag along to hear him perform live. Guest star: David Tennant as Oscar's Brain
86	4	"A Charity Fair to Remember"	C. H. Greenblatt and William Reiss	Joe Johnston	Maxwell Atoms, Darrick Bachman, C.H. Greenblatt, Joe Johnston, Noah Z. Jones, and Craig Lewis	June 21, 2013	304b	2.65
Bea's overzealous good intentions create chaos at the annual fair.
87	5	"Bye Bye Bea Bea"	Derek Evanick and Diana Lafyatis	C. H. Greenblatt and William Reiss	Maxwell Atoms, Darrick Bachman, Nick Confalone, Neal Dusedau, C.H. Greenblatt, Noah Z. Jones, Craig Lewis, Meghan McCarthy, Tim McKeon, and William Reiss	July 5, 2013	306a	2.01
When Bea's dad lands a new job in Fish Phoenix, the gang sets out to find him a better job in Freshwater so Bea won't have to move away.
88	6	"Glass Man Standing"	C. H. Greenblatt and William Reiss	Joe Johnston	Maxwell Atoms, Darrick Bachman, C.H. Greenblatt, Joe Johnston, Noah Z. Jones, Craig Lewis, and William Reiss	July 5, 2013	306b	2.01
When Albert's voice starts to change naturally, it seems like he's finally going to be treated like a man, but when his new voice abandons him at the worst possible moment, he'll have to learn that it's not the voice that makes the man, but the man that makes the voice. Guest star: Jaime Pressly as Lafeesha and Patrick Warburton as Albert's New Voice
89	7	"South Pafishic"	C. H. Greenblatt and William Reiss	Dominic Bisignano	Maxwell Atoms, Darrick Bachman, Dominic Bisignano, C.H. Greenblatt, Noah Z. Jones, and Craig Lewis	July 26, 2013	303a	2.63
When Fishington decides to cut the Drama Department, Bea and her friends decide to venture into Fishington's brain to change her mind or they'll lose the department forever.
90	8	"Unresolved Fishues"	Derek Evanick and Diana Lafyatis	Ian Wasseluk	Maxwell Atoms, Darrick Bachman, C. H. Greenblatt, Noah Z. Jones, Craig Lewis, William Reiss, and Ian Wasseluk	August 2, 2013	305a	2.65
When Jumbo begins dating Oscar's ex-girlfriend, things quickly turn awkward between the two, especially when Oscar's attempts to make peace with his ex backfires.
91	9	"Freshwater Five-O"	C. H. Greenblatt and William Reiss	Ian Wasseluk	Maxwell Atoms, Darrick Bachman, C. H. Greenblatt, Noah Z. Jones, Craig Lewis, and William Reiss	August 9, 2013	311b	2.88
When Milo and Jocktopus are invited on a police ride-along, they are convinced it means they're real cops and set out to prove it.
92	10	"Pool Party Panic"	C. H. Greenblatt and William Reiss	Joe Johnston	Maxwell Atoms, Darrick Bachman, C. H. Greenblatt, Joe Johnston, Noah Z. Jones, Craig Lewis, and William Reiss	August 23, 2013	313	3.23
Milo wakes up in class to discover that everyone at Freshwater High has turned into humans, and as he prepares for Shellsea's epic Pool Party, he has to figure out what's real and what's not as he desperately tries to keep his popular reputation intact.
93	11	"Labor of Love"	Maxwell Atoms, C. H. Greenblatt, and William Reiss	Derek Evanick, Joe Johnston, and Diana Lafyatis	Maxwell Atoms, Darrick Bachman, C. H. Greenblatt, Derek Evanick, Noah Z. Jones, Joe Johnston, Diana Lafyatis, Craig Lewis, and William Reiss	September 20, 2013	302	2.33
Mr. Baldwin wants to propose to Ms. Lips, but she's leaving on vacation to Flip Flop Island for the summer, so the kids come up with the perfect excuse to follow her-with a field trip. Guest star: Michael Clarke Duncan as Guardian Cat (Note: This is Michael Clarke Duncan's final performance prior to his passing on September 2012.)
94	12	"Assignment: Babies"	C. H. Greenblatt and William Reiss	Derek Evanick and Diana Lafyatis	Maxwell Atoms, Darrick Bachman, C. H. Greenblatt, Noah Z. Jones, and Craig Lewis	September 27, 2013	303b	2.08
Weary from his new duties as a father, Mr. Baldwin hands his babies out to the class to help babysit for the week. Later, though, after being paired together, Oscar and Bea quickly realize that temporary Parenthood may tear them apart.
95	13	"Hare and Back Again"	C. H. Greenblatt and William Reiss	Maxwell Atoms and C.H. Greenblatt	Maxwell Atoms, Darrick Bachman, C. H. Greenblatt, Craig Lewis, and William Reiss	October 18, 2013	309a	2.14
Milo joins Oscar, Albert, and Jumbo in their fantasy role-playing game, and fight for the rights of bunnies everywhere.
96	14	"Milo's Pony"	C. H. Greenblatt and William Reiss	Niki Yang, C. H. Greenblatt, and William Reiss	Maxwell Atoms, Darrick Bachman, C. H. Greenblatt, Noah Z. Jones, Craig Lewis, and William Reiss	October 18, 2013	309b	2.14
Milo befriends an adorable pony fish but worries that his manly friends won't understand.
97	15	"The Brandon Bubble"	C. H. Greenblatt and William Reiss	Tyler Chen	Maxwell Atoms, Darrick Bachman, C. H. Greenblatt, Noah Z. Jones, Craig Lewis, and William Reiss	November 1, 2013	307a	2.27
Brandon Bubbler's manager sends him to Freshwater High to become a regular teenager.
98	16	"Jocktopizza"	C. H. Greenblatt and William Reiss	C. H. Greenblatt	Darrick Bachman, C. H. Greenblatt, Noah Z. Jones, Craig Lewis, and William Reiss	November 1, 2013	307b	2.27
Jocktopus' dad wants Jocktopus to create his own pizza.
99	17	"Hats Amore!"	C. H. Greenblatt and William Reiss	Neil Graf, C. H. Greenblatt, and William Reiss	Maxwell Atoms, Darrick Bachman, C. H. Greenblatt, Noah Z. Jones, Craig Lewis, and William Reiss	November 22, 2013	305b	2.02
Ms. Lips brings Baldwin to the racetrack to meet her disapproving parents. To prove that he's manly enough to marry her, Baldwin enters a race.
100	18	"Camp Camp"	Derek M. Evanick and Diana Lafyatis	Derek M. Evanick and Diana Lafyatis	Maxwell Atoms, Darrick Bachman, C. H. Greenblatt, Noah Z. Jones, Craig Lewis, and William Reiss	January 10, 2014	314	1.73
The school, along with Brandon Bubbler, go to a camp, where Bea tries to get Bubbler to date her. Meanwhile, the kids try to escape the camp. Guest Star: Jan Hooks as Savannah Salmonds (Note: This is Jan Hook's final performance 10 months before her passing)
101	19	"Algae Day"	Derek Evanick and Diana Lafyatis	Kyle A. Carrozza, Derek Evanick, and Diana Lafyatis	Maxwell Atoms, Darrick Bachman, C. H. Greenblatt, Noah Z. Jones, Craig Lewis, and William Reiss	January 24, 2014	308a	2.22
School gets cancelled for a day, and Milo wants to have some fun in the snowy algae. He's unhappy, though, when no one wants to play with him, so he hangs out with twins Dan and Ann Chovi.
102	20	"Bea Saves a Tree"	C. H. Greenblatt and William Reiss	Tyler Chen and Niki Yang	Maxwell Atoms, Darrick Bachman, C. H. Greenblatt, Noah Z. Jones, Craig Lewis, and William Reiss	January 24, 2014	311a	2.22
A new shop is prepared for construction, and the only thing in the way is a plastic tree, one that Bea is planning to protect in the name of her childhood. Upon hearing news of who is in charge of the grand opening, she and Shellsea form a plan to save the tree and have the store built. The plan soon goes awry and they must try to get the tree back.
103	21	"Surfing the Interwet"	C. H. Greenblatt and William Reiss	Maxwell Atoms, Sherm Cohen, Derek Evanick, C.H. Greenblatt, Carson Kugler, Diana Lafyatis, William Reiss, and David Shair	Maxwell Atoms, Darrick Bachman, C. H. Greenblatt, Noah Z. Jones, Craig Lewis, and William Reiss	February 21, 2014	315a	2.30
Ms. Lips watches internet videos.
104	22	"Don't Let the Fish Drive the Party Bus"	C. H. Greenblatt	Maxwell Atoms, C. H. Greenblatt, Noah Z. Jones, and William Reiss	Maxwell Atoms, Darrick Bachman, C. H. Greenblatt, Noah Z. Jones, Craig Lewis, and William Reiss	February 21, 2014	315b	2.30
Milo throws a party on a party bus.
105	23	"Milo in a Cup"	C. H. Greenblatt and William Reiss	Tyler Chen	Maxwell Atoms, Darrick Bachman, C. H. Greenblatt, Noah Z. Jones, and Craig Lewis	February 28, 2014	310b	2.22
When Oscar is feeling down and left out, Milo gives him a taste of his personality.
106	24	"Fish Taco"	C. H. Greenblatt and William Reiss	Maxwell Atoms, C. H. Greenblatt, and William Reiss	Maxwell Atoms, Darrick Bachman, Noah Z. Jones, Craig Lewis, and William Reiss	February 28, 2014	312a	2.22
When Finberley delivers the taco to the wrong customer, things go crazy when everyone chases the taco.
107	25	"Brothers of a Feather"	C. H. Greenblatt and William Reiss	Joe Johnston	Maxwell Atoms, Darrick Bachman, C. H. Greenblatt, Joe Johnston, Noah Z. Jones, Craig Lewis, and William Reiss	March 7, 2014	308b	1.85
Milo and Oscar sleep in a bird's nest and the owner, a mother bird with no kids, think they are her bird kids.
108	26	"I Have This Friend"	C. H. Greenblatt and William Reiss	William Reiss	Maxwell Atoms, Darrick Bachman, C. H. Greenblatt, Noah Z. Jones, Craig Lewis, and William Reiss	March 7, 2014	310a	1.85
When Shellsea says she has a "strange" friend, they sort out to try to set her up on a date with Michael. It is revealed that Shellsea's weird friend actually was Michael.
109	27	"Freshwater Lives"	C. H. Greenblatt and William Reiss	Ian Wasseluk	Maxwell Atoms, Darrick Bachman, C. H. Greenblatt, Noah Z. Jones, and Craig Lewis	March 21, 2014	312b	1.78
Milo meets the founder of Freshwater, and he feels excited over the idea–until the moment finally arises.
110	28	"The Big Woo"	C. H. Greenblatt and William Reiss	Maxwell Atoms, Derek Evanick, C. H. Greenblatt, Noah Z. Jones, Diana Lafyatis, and William Reiss	Maxwell Atoms, Darrick Bachman, Derek Evanick, C. H. Greenblatt, Noah Z. Jones, Diana Lafyatis, Craig Lewis, and William Reiss	April 4, 2014	316	1.91
In the series finale, it's graduation week at Freshwater High and with school ending and emotions running rampant, Bea and Oscar’s friendship is tested when they grapple with the idea of finally admitting their feelings for one another. Meanwhile, Milo tries to pull off the ultimate prank on Mr. Baldwin before graduating.
