= Chowder (TV series) =

American animated television series

- Genre: Adventure; Fantasy; Surreal comedy
- Created by: C. H. Greenblatt
- Creative director: William Reiss
- Voices of: Nicky Jones; Dwight Schultz; Kevin Michael Richardson (pilot only); John DiMaggio; Tara Strong; C. H. Greenblatt; Dana Snyder; Will Shadley; Liliana Mumy; Mindy Sterling
- Theme music composer: C. H. Greenblatt; Dan Boer; Zac Pike
- Composers: Dan Boer; Zac Pike
- Country of origin: United States
- Original language: English
- No. of seasons: 3
- No. of episodes: 49 (93 segments) (list of episodes)

Production
- Executive producers: C. H. Greenblatt; Brian A. Miller
- Producer: Louis J. Cuck
- Running time: 22 minutes
- Production company: Cartoon Network Studios

Original release
- Network: Cartoon Network
- Release: November 2, 2007 – August 7, 2010

Chowder is an American animated surreal comedy television series created by C. H. Greenblatt for Cartoon Network. It premiered on November 2, 2007, and ended on August 7, 2010, after three seasons with a total of 49 episodes.

The series follows an aspiring young boy named Chowder and his day-to-day adventures as an apprentice in Chef Mung Daal's catering company. Although he means well, Chowder often finds himself in predicaments due to his perpetual appetite and his nature as a scatterbrain. Chowder's guidance in his goal to become a master chef is influenced by Mung's wife, Truffles; Mung's assistant Shnitzel; Mung's rival Endive; her apprentice Panini, who has a perpetual crush on Chowder; as well as other side characters.

The show had one win and two nominations at the Primetime Emmy Awards as well as six nominations at the Annie Awards.

== Premise ==
The series revolves around the titular Chowder, who works as an apprentice to chef Mung Daal at his catering company. Though he is lighthearted and carefree, Chowder's actions habitually land him in circumstances beyond his control, partly due to his large appetite and absent-mindedness. Mung and his wife Truffles, Mung's rock monster employee Shnitzel, and Chowder's gaseous pet Kimchi all try to aid Chowder in his ambitions to become a great chef, but frequently find themselves undermined by the calamitous antics that ensue. Chowder is also undermined by Panini, a girl who has an unrequited love for Chowder, going so far as to say that he is her boyfriend despite the pair not actually dating.

== Episodes ==
Season	Segments	Episodes	Originally released	
Season	Segments	Episodes	First released	Last released
1	38	20	November 2, 2007	July 24, 2008
2	38	20	October 2, 2008	October 8, 2009
3	17	9	October 15, 2009	August 7, 2010

== Characters ==
=== Main ===
- Chowder (voiced by Nicky Jones): A chubby, purple, 9-year-old anthropomorphic, cat-bear-rabbit hybrid who serves as an apprentice under the chef Mung Daal; Chowder lives with him and his wife, Truffles, in a room at the top of the catering business. Chowder wants to become a great chef, but he is very impulsive and scatterbrained and often gives in to his urges. He has a large appetite and eats anything, even a customer's order. Chowder can also regurgitate objects, and he is used as a storage container by the other characters. According to Greenblatt, he is a composite of a cat, a bear, and a rabbit, and his species was verified in at least one episode. C. H. Greenblatt voiced his adult self in the last episode, called "Chowder Grows Up".
- Mung Daal (voiced by Dwight Schultz): The elderly chef who runs the catering company at which Chowder works. He serves as his cooking master. Although his exact age has not been stated, he has mentioned that he has cooked for at least 386 years, and he celebrated 450 years of marriage to Truffles. He likes to impress ladies to the point where as a child apprentice, he prepared a dish incorrectly due to becoming distracted. He is a light blue-colored humanoid with an oversized nose, ears, and a white mustache. He is named after the Indian dish mung daal. Greenblatt had originally planned to give Mung an Indian accent, but later decided against it.
- Truffles (voiced by Tara Strong): A mushroom pixie/fairy and Mung Daal's wife who handles the business side of Mung's catering business. She is an extreme choleric. Greenblatt said that he based Truffles on his mother. Greenblatt said that he initially found difficulty in working on any story with Truffles since the character could be "so abrasive" that the Chowder staff had to be "a little more sensitive about finding her softer side". Greenblatt said that the staff eventually decided that "a little Truffles goes a long way".
- Shnitzel (voiced by Kevin Michael Richardson in "The Froggy Apple Crumple Thumpkin", and John DiMaggio afterward): A taupe rock monster and professional chef who works at Mung Daal's Catering Company. His vocabulary consists almost entirely of "radda", although he sometimes says other simple words. Shnitzel is the "straight man" to the other more excitable characters and is frequently agitated. He gets stuck with menial labor or cleanup duty, as well as heavy lifting because he is incredibly strong.
- Panini (voiced by Liliana Mumy): A pink rabbit who has a crush on Chowder and reminds him at every opportunity. Chowder does not return her feelings and responds with "I'm not your boyfriend!" whenever she greets him. Panini is an apprentice to Endive and is also possessive of Chowder. Panini gets jealous when she sees Chowder with another girl, which causes Chowder to try to avoid her. Greenblatt said that the details of Panini formed when the creator decided that Panini had a crush on Chowder; since Chowder is not old enough to fall in love with females, according to Greenblatt, this aspect would frustrate Chowder "in a more fun way". Grey DeLisle voiced her adult self in the last episode called "Chowder Grows Up".
- Kimchi (vocal effects provided by C. H. Greenblatt): Chowder's pet stink cloud, who lives in a cage next to his bed. Kimchi is an anthropomorphic fart cloud (due to the odor of kimchi). He likes things with odors unpleasant for the other characters, and he "talks" by making fart sounds. Kimchi is usually shown with a blank personality but in "Stinky Love" it is shown that he has an opinion.
- Gazpacho (voiced by Dana Snyder): A woolly mammoth storekeeper who sells strange produce at his fruit stand at a farmer's market. Gazpacho is Chowder's best friend. He does his best to offer advice to Chowder when needed. In "The Spookiest House in Marzipan" it is hinted that Gazpacho has no mother, and that he actually has dissociative identity disorder, but creator Greenblatt says this was merely to "pay homage to Psycho". Gazpacho shows no interest in moving out and improving his own life. Gazpacho's worst enemies are ninjas. Greenblatt named him after the cold soup gazpacho; Greenblatt said that he did not know why, but the name suited the character immediately.
- Endive (voiced by Mindy Sterling): An intelligent, snobbish and large orange humanoid who teaches cooking to Panini with strict discipline. She regularly berates Mung, whom she considers a rival. The creator describes her as Martha Stewart with Oompa-Loompa colors. Greenblatt chose to name her after the endive since endive is bitter and Belgian endive is fancy; hence the character is bitter and fancy. Endive's character stayed constant throughout the initial development. The long nose, which changed from a rectangular shape to a triangle shape for the final version, represents how Endive looks down at other characters. It was revealed in later episodes that Endive is in love with Shnitzel. Greenblatt said that her evolution throughout the series was fun to observe, especially when William Reiss wrote plots involving Endive.
- Gorgonzola (voiced by Will Shadley): A young green rat apprentice candle holder. He shows jealousy towards Chowder because Chowder has a better job than him. Because blue cheese was one of the few foods Greenblatt disliked, he decided to use the name "gorgonzola" for a character who did not get along with Chowder. Gorgonzola wears tattered brown clothes and no shoes and has a partially melted candle on his head (for traditional reasons). He is desperate to get cash and will do almost anything to get it. Despite his unpleasant and boastful attitude to Chowder, Chowder sees him as a close friend, which irritates him even more. Gorgonzola is an apprentice to Stilton, who is a candle holder, hence why both characters have burning candles on their heads.

=== Recurring ===
- Ceviche (voiced by Elan Garfias): A young yellow (and somewhat androgynous) goat apprentice to Paté and Panini's best friend. He practices aerobic-style dancing and is very charitable and kind to others. Because of his admirable attitude, amazing talents, and good looks, he is well-liked. He is good friends with Panini and will make unwanted advances upon her, which are either refused or unnoticed. Ceviche is also a close friend to Chowder. He speaks in a monotone voice and serves as deadpan humor for the show.
- Paté (voiced by John DiMaggio): A tall, well-sculpted humanoid ballet dance master and operatic singer with a deep voice, grass-green hair, a small black hat, and exaggerated lips who is the mentor of Ceviche.
- Chestnut (originally voiced by Tone Loc, then John DiMaggio): A tiny, blue-horned imp with a beard. He has a deep, gravelly voice and, to many character's surprises, is physically very strong. Because of his size, he uses everyday objects as other things. He sings small songs to himself, usually consisting of his catchphrase of "Dinka-loo, Dinka-lee." He is the teacher of the BLTs, a parody of the SATs. He always refers to himself in the third person when speaking.
- Ancho (voiced by Phil LaMarr): A dog with a heavy accent, big hat, and a tie-shaped growth on his neck which he is offended by whenever someone jokes around with it. Chowder tends to run into him whenever he appears.
- Reuben (voiced by Paul Reubens): A rather vulgar pig who is a con man and likes to steal from others. He has a large liking for sandwiches, most likely taken from the fact he is named after a type of sandwich.
- Mr. Fugu (voiced by Bob Joles): A sentient floating balloon who is said to be Mung's most frequent and affluent customer. He is proven to be more greedy than Chowder and never shares any food with him. He is often seen with his valet, Foie Gras, a Maneki-neko (meows provided by George Takei) holding Mr. Fugu's string as he cannot control his flotation due to his kind being a balloon.
- Sgt. Hoagie (voiced by Diedrich Bader): He is a dog who is a police officer in Marzipan City. In "The Hot Date", he was going out on a date after several years and asked the other cops for advice.
- Kiwi (voiced by C. H. Greenblatt) is a photorealistic pink creature who sometimes gives usually useless advice to Chowder and other characters and occasionally provides interstitial narrations, especially at times where particularly corny humor is displayed.

== Production ==
=== Development ===
The puppet versions of the characters Chowder (a Hand-Rod puppet) and Mung Daal

During his time working on Nickelodeon's SpongeBob SquarePants, C. H. Greenblatt had been sketching various characters for his own animation series concept. Greenblatt originally based the premise on the idea of the sorcerer's apprentice style of story, such as The Sword in the Stone. The plot devices were modified so that the story revolves around a master chef who teaches his young apprentice how to cook. Chowder himself was developed with no specific species in mind, but rather with the intentions of invoking the image of a child's soft squeeze toy. Some of the inspiration comes from Dr. Seuss, with other inspiration from Saturday morning cartoons.

Greenblatt pitched the concept to Cartoon Network in the mid-2000s when he began working as a writer and storyboard artist for The Grim Adventures of Billy & Mandy, and two years later the series was approved with another year for production before the pilot episode aired. Greenblatt estimates he spent about seven years working on Chowder before the show made it to air in 2007. Chowder was animated by Hong Ying Animation.

=== Format ===
Episodes are produced in seasons which consist of twenty 22-minute episodes. Each episode is produced with a 30-second puppet sequence that is meant to run over the ending credits. Episodes can be purchased from the iTunes Store in the United States which are delivered with the sequences as are episodes which are available on Cartoon Network's VOD website also within the United States.

One of the unusual design features of the show is the patterns used on the clothing or players. The patterns are developed as a full-screen image and then sent to the production house, where the characters are modified to fill the patterns in over the character clothing. Using this technique, when a character moves, their patterns do not follow, but display as a "static" background. A similar technique was used in the Monkey Island video game series (particularly for the character Stan), the Nickelodeon series The Off-Beats, and the Mr. Bean animated series.

The show is also known for the very wide variety of media used in various episodes. These include animation using watercolors and ink-and-paint in addition to the cartoon's classic pattern style. It also uses stop motion animation with real food, action figures, and clay; live-action scenes with the voice actors of the show and puppets; both marionette and hand puppets. This was also sometimes used in Courage the Cowardly Dog.

=== Cancellation ===
Chowder was canceled by Cartoon Network in August 2009, as the network felt the show did not fit its new demographic of older boys, favoring shows such as the live-action Destroy Build Destroy instead. On his blog, C. H. Greenblatt expressed relief about having his schedule freed up by the cancellation, saying: "I didn't really think there'd be this many upsides to having a show officially canceled by a network, but I'm feeling happier than I've been in a long time. Since we've only got post-production, my schedule finally eases up. I haven't had a break like this in a long, long time... Chowder has opened up a lot of awesome possibilities for me, and creatively I'm feeling more inspired than ever."

== Home media ==
Chowder home video releases
Season		Episodes	Volume	Release dates		Episode(s) include
Season		Episodes	Volume	United States	Thailand	Episode(s) include
1	2007–08	20	1	November 4, 2008	November 10, 2010	"The Froggy Apple Crumple Thumpkin" / "Chowder's Girlfriend" • "Grubble Gum" – "The Sing Beans" • "Mahjongg Night" – "The Flibber-Flabber Diet"
1	2007–08	20	1	May 6, 2014	November 10, 2010	"The Froggy Apple Crumple Thumpkin" / "Chowder's Girlfriend" • "Grubble Gum" – "The Sing Beans" • "Mahjongg Night" – "The Flibber-Flabber Diet"
1	2007–08	20	2	March 3, 2009	December 15, 2010	"Burple Nurples" / "Shnitzel Makes a Deposit" • "The Wrong Address" / "The Wrong Customer" • "Gazpacho Stands Up" – "Mung on the Rocks"
1	2007–08	20	3	—N/a	January 19, 2010	"The Heavy Sleeper" – "The Rat Sandwich"
1	2007–08	20	4	—N/a	February 15, 2011	"Chowder Loses His Hat" – "The Apprentice Games"
2	2008–09	20	5	—N/a	March 15, 2011	"The Arborians" – "The Catch Phrase"
2	2008–09	20	6	—N/a	April 8, 2011	"The Hot Date" – "The Deadly Maze" • "The B.L.T.'s" – "The Dinner Theater"
2	2008–09	20	7	—N/a	May 10, 2011	"Kid Shnitzel" / "Gazpacho Fights Back" • "Big Ball" – "The Blackout"
2	2008–09	20	8	—N/a	June 14, 2011	"The Dice Cycle" – "The Grape Worm"
2	2008–09	20	9	N/A	July 26, 2011	"A Faire to Remember" – "The Birthday Suits"
3	2009–10	9	9	N/A	July 26, 2011	"A Faire to Remember" – "The Birthday Suits"
3	2009–10	9	10	—N/a	August 24, 2011	"The Heist" – "Chowder Grows Up"

The entire series has been released in ten Region 3 fullscreen DVD volumes in Thailand from MVD Company Limited. Every episode of Chowder is also available on the iTunes Store. The series to date, has no complete release in the United States.

== Reception ==
=== Critical response ===
Barry Garron of The Hollywood Reporter thought that the show would appeal to children and adults alike, using exotic artwork, unusual settings, and a zany cast of characters. On Toon Zone, Ed Liu expands on the animation and crazy antics of the characters, pointing that "the humor is kid-friendly without being juvenile" and praising it for getting laughs, "without resorting to an excess of toilet humor, even if Chowder's pet happens to be a sentient fart cloud." Aaron H. Bynum on Animation Insider wrote, "Featuring brightly colored environments, stylishly matted/fixed background artwork and humorously designed characters with unique personalities to boot, Chowder is one of the network's largest creative accomplishments in recent years."

Entertainment Weekly ranked Chowder number ten in its list of "10 Best Cartoon Network Shows" in 2012.

=== Awards and nominations ===
Year	Association	Category	Recipient	Result
2008	Annie Awards	Best Animated Television Production for Children	Chowder	Nominated
2008	Annie Awards	Outstanding Writing in an Animated Television Production	C. H. Greenblatt and William Reiss (for "Burple Nurples")	Nominated
2008	Primetime Emmy Awards	Outstanding Special Class — Short-format Animated Programs	C. H. Greenblatt, Brian A. Miller, Jennifer Pelphrey, Louis Cuck, Juli Hashiguchi, William Reiss ad Eddy Houchins (for "Burple Nurples")	Nominated
2009	Annie Awards	Outstanding Production Design in an Animated Television Production	Dan Krall (for "The Heavy Sleeper")	Nominated
2009	Annie Awards	Outstanding Voice Acting in a Television Production	Dwight Schultz (as Mung Daal)	Nominated
2009	Primetime Emmy Awards	Outstanding Individual Achievement in Animation	Joe Binggeli (for "Shnitzel & the Lead Farfel")	Won
2010	Annie Awards	Outstanding Voice Acting in a Television Production	Nicky Jones (as Chowder)	Nominated
2010	Annie Awards	Outstanding Voice Acting in a Television Production	Dwight Schultz (as Mung Daal)	Nominated
2010	Primetime Emmy Awards	Outstanding Short-format Animated Program	Brian A. Miller, C. H. Greenblatt, Jennifer Pelphrey, Louis Cuck, Kevin A. Kramer, William Reiss, Ian Wasseluk and Eddy Houchins (for "The Toots")	Nominated

== Proposed reboot ==
In May 2026, series creator C. H. Greenblatt revealed that in 2024 he had been asked by Cartoon Network to pitch a reboot of the show aimed at a younger audience. His reimagining, titled Chowder: First Course, would have involved Chowder, Panini, and Gorgonzola as students in culinary school. The series was not picked up, as Cartoon Network was unable to afford it.

== Cultural impact ==
In 2019, American rapper Lil Nas X released a song entitled "Panini", which was named after the Chowder character of the same name, and later made a music video for the remix of his song featuring characters from Chowder. Although Greenblatt was not involved in the production of the music video, he did praise the video on his Tumblr blog.

== Appearances in other media ==
Chowder and Shnitzel made cameos in the OK K.O.! Let's Be Heroes episode "Crossover Nexus".

Chowder, Shnitzel, and Truffles made cameos in the Jellystone! series finale, "Crisis of the Infinite Mirths".

Chowder (along with his pet stink cloud, Kimchi) appears as a playable character in the crossover video game Cartoon Network: Punch Time Explosion, with Tara Strong (who voiced Truffles) voicing Chowder instead of Nicky Jones. He also appeared in FusionFall, with Nicky Jones reprising his role.

Chowder also makes cameo appearances in Underfist: Halloween Bash (appearing in the eye of a pumpkin float) and the Teen Titans Go! episodes "Warner Bros. 100th Anniversary" and "Favorite Animated Show Nominee", along with several other Cartoon Network characters.
