= Fish Hooks =

American animated television series

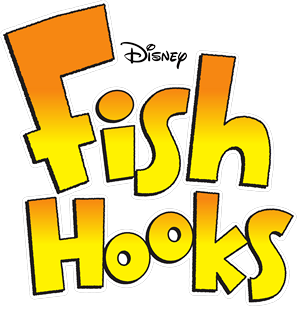
- Genre: Slice of life Animated sitcom
- Created by: Noah Z. Jones
- Developed by: Alex Hirsch; William Reiss
- Directed by: Maxwell Atoms; C. H. Greenblatt; Derek Evanick; Diana Lafyatis; William Reiss; Mr. Warburton
- Voices of: Kyle Massey; Justin Roiland; Chelsea Kane
- Opening theme: "Ring the Bell" by Jeremy Fisher
- Composer: Andy Sturmer
- Country of origin: United States
- Original language: English
- No. of seasons: 3
- No. of episodes: 59 (110 segments) (list of episodes)

Production
- Executive producers: Maxwell Atoms; Noah Z. Jones (Note: Credited as a co-executive producer in season 1)
- Animator: Mercury Filmworks
- Editors: Illya Owens; Kevin Locarro; Carmen Woods; Robbi Smith; Keith Cook
- Running time: 22 minutes
- Production company: Disney Television Animation

Original release
- Network: Disney Channel
- Release: September 3, 2010 – April 4, 2014

Fish Hooks is an American animated television series created by Noah Z. Jones and developed by Alex Hirsch and William Reiss for Disney Channel. The show ran for three seasons from September 3, 2010, to April 4, 2014, airing a total of 59 episodes.

== Plot ==
The series revolves around a fun-personified fish named Milo, his nervous brother Oscar, and their "overly dramatic" best friend Bea Goldfishberg, with whom Oscar is infatuated. They attend a school known as Freshwater High, submerged in an aquarium in a pet store named Bud's Pets. The series chronicles their daily lives as they deal with typical teen problems, such as romance and homework, as well as havoc conjured with other animals in the pet store.

== Episodes ==
Season	Segments	Episodes	Originally released	
Season	Segments	Episodes	First released	Last released
1	40	21	September 3, 2010	October 21, 2011
2	42	22	October 7, 2011	May 17, 2013
3	28	16	June 7, 2013	April 4, 2014

== Characters ==
=== Main ===
- Milo (voiced by Kyle Massey) is an adventurous Siamese fighting fish who is a self-proclaimed "party guy". He attempts to have fun in any situation and is very loud and often dangerous. He is best friends with Bea and his older brother Oscar. In "Fail Fish", Milo is shown to have an attention-related disability and only learns by absorbing knowledge in near-death situations.
- Oscar (voiced by Justin Roiland) is a nervous, socially awkward catfish with an afro and Milo's older brother. He is an avid video game player and regularly serves as the voice-of-reason and meditator between the main cast. He is perpetually stressed throughout the series, mostly because of Milo's misadventures and wild behavior. He is shown as a neat-freak, as well as despite being brothers with Milo, they are the opposite of each other (along with being entirely different species). For the first season of the series, Oscar is secretly in love with Bea. This continues into roughly mid-Season 2, where he gets a crush on an angelfish named Angela. After Angela spends nearly all of prom playing video games, Oscar accidentally calls her Bea, and they subsequently break up. Afterward, Oscar goes back to loving Bea, with Bea harboring feelings for him as well leading in the two becoming a couple in the series finale.
- Bea Goldfishberg (voiced by Chelsea Kane) is a goldfish who is very "overly dramatic". She dreams of becoming a professional actress. For most of the series, her friend Oscar has a huge crush on her, to which she is completely oblivious. She is extremely self-centered and tends to boast about her acting abilities and various talents, but is otherwise good-hearted. She has a great interest in drama and theatre and constantly enrolls in various school plays. At the end of the series, Bea finally gets in a relationship with Oscar.

=== Recurring ===
- Shellsea (voiced by Kari Wahlgren) is a stoic, regularly monotonic jewelfish who is Bea's best friend. She loves fashion and takes pride in her looks. She is often pessimistic, but cares very much for her friends and talks in a stereotypical "valley girl" voice. She usually has to snap Bea out of her dramatic tantrums or provide solutions to her problems, but supports her and is also good friends with Finberley, Koi, and Esmargot (though she regularly talks behind Oscar's back). Like most of the other female cast, she has a huge crush on Steve Jackson.
- Clamantha (voiced by Alex Hirsch) is a clam with pink hair, who is also the head cheerleader of the Freshwater High Cheerleading Squad. She is very optimistic about everything. She enjoys spending time with her friends and memorizing cheerleading choreography. She has a obsessive crush on Oscar, has a shrine dedicated to him in her locker, and regularly stalks him and follows him in secret. She is also very childlike as shown by the fact that her door is covered in unicorns and rainbows, while her room is full of dolls. She has her own pink car that she drives, despite her not having any hands. In the series finale, she transforms into a butterfly upon eating her diploma.
- Albert Glass (voiced by Atticus Shaffer) is a nerdy glass fish who is very intelligent and diligent. He is abnormally pale and, as a result of being transparent, his brain can be seen through his head. He is best friends with Jumbo Shrimp and is good friends with Milo, Oscar and (after initially being turned off of her need to feel popular and loved by everyone) Bea. Albert is very shy and quiet and he and Jumbo are the main targets of bullying from Jocktopus and his gang. He is shown to play the violin. He starts dating Esmargot in "Chicks Dig Vampires". In the season 3 episode "Glass Man Standing", Albert's voice (provided by Patrick Warburton) gets lower and he grows a mustache.
- Jumbo Shrimp (voiced by Steven Christopher Parker) is an awkward shrimp who is best friends with Albert Glass. Jumbo is a science nerd and loves figuring out and solving problems, finding and correcting errors in textbooks, as well as researching various topics in his spare time. Like Albert, Jumbo is an easy target for bullies. After his robot date for prom leaves him, He and Angela begin dating.
- Finberley (voiced by Kimberly Mooney) is a small, energetic, kind fish who is one of Bea's friends. Finberley is often seen with Esmargot and has a notable crush on Steve Jackson, more so than the rest of the cast. A running gag on the show is that she is injured on a regular basis and recovers in the next scene. She also appears to have a notable crush on Milo.
- Esmargot (voiced by Rachel Dratch) is a strange slimy sea slug. Esmargot appears to be constantly sick with a stuffed nose, as well as she leaves a trail of slime behind wherever she goes. Esmargot is one of Bea's friends, and like the other girls has a crush on Steve Jackson. She starts dating Albert Glass in "Chicks Dig Vampires".
- Koi (voiced by Rachel Dratch) is a koi fish and one of Bea's friends. She is the second biggest fish in Freshwater High, the first being Jocktopus. Even though she's really sweet, she can get mad easily. She doesn't talk, instead making grunting noises. Koi is on the school basketball team and is often considered the strongest player due to her height and physical strength.
- Jocktopus (voiced by John DiMaggio) is an orange octopus who bullies those smaller than him and refers to himself in third person. He is part of the football team. People usually avoid him, due to him being strong and aggressive.
- Piranhica (voiced by Laura Ortiz) is a piranha with yellow hair. She is Jocktopus' girlfriend who is also a bully. She is intimidating and loves provoking others. She hates nerds like Albert and Jumbo, and doesn't like people that are annoying.
- Steve Jackson (voiced by Greg Cipes) is a fish who most girls at Freshwater High have a crush on. He has wavy blond hair, which is where he puts his hair gel. He is the most popular kid in school, which causes all boys to wonder what makes him so perfect.
- Mr. Baldwin (voiced by Dana Snyder) is Milo, Oscar and Bea's homeroom teacher, a seahorse, at Freshwater High. Baldwin openly despises Milo and seems to hate his job. He is always bored, unenthusiastic, sarcastic and lazy and is constantly trying to find a way to quit his job as a teacher. He is pregnant for the majority of the series until "Labor of Love", where he gives birth to 100–200 baby seahorses.
- Principal Stickler (voiced by Jerry Stiller in Season 1 and Jeff Bennett in Season 2) is Freshwater High's principal. Principal Stickler is a sea urchin who shouts orders to his assistant, Nurse Fishington. He is very strict and careful about sanitation and is an obsessive clean-freak similar to Oscar - which leads to overreactions which quickly get out-of-hand. In "Principal Bea", Stickler gives the position of principal to Fishington, as well as pilots a robotic walker, apparently planning on leaving the pet shop for good. However, he returns afterward in "Get a Yob!".
- Randall "Randy" Pincherson (voiced by Josh Sussman) is a greedy fiddler crab. Randy comes from a rich family and is thus extremely spoiled and able to afford practically anything he wants. He enjoys provoking, blackmailing, lying to, double-crossing, and threatening his fellow students for varying reasons, as well as boasting constantly about his wealth. He is very sarcastic and lazy, as well as obnoxious, selfish and narcissistic, but ultimately tragically pathetic. Early on he is a bully to Milo, though he devolves into more of a pest as the series progresses. Randy has a one-sided crush on Bea, which becomes one of his main concerns after Oscar starts dating Angela.
- Pass (voiced by Roger Craig Smith), Punt (voiced by Dave Wittenberg), and Fumble (voiced by Alex Hirsch) are a lake trout, gar and grouper trio of football players who are Jocktopus' friends and assist him with his bullying. Although it seems Jocktopus just uses them for that sole purpose, they are still loyal to him almost all of the time. Punt is the tallest and apparent leader of the trio, Pass is the shortest and most intelligent and Fumble is the least intelligent.
- Snake (voiced by Kari Wahlgren) and Mouse (voiced by Vanessa Marshall) are a duo consisting of a perky, bubbly snake and a sarcastic, outspoken mouse who appear during the credit sequences at the end of most episodes. They live together in a terrarium in front of the fish tanks, usually commenting on what the fishes are going through or getting into their own comical hijinks.

== Production ==
In 2009, Disney Channels Worldwide's President of Entertainment Gary Marsh said of the show, "The Fish Hooks team has created one of the most original, inventive animated series on television – bringing an ingenious twist to the classic archetypes of high school life." The series is produced using a mix of 2D digital animation and photo collages. The series is created and co-executive produced by children's book illustrator Noah Z. Jones, who initially came to Disney by making a short pilot for Fish Hooks (then-titled Fish Tale) through the Shorty McShorts' Shorts development program, where that original short pilot was further developed for television by Alex Hirsch and Bill Reiss. Main and recurring cast were announced in a Disney Channel press release on August 26, 2010.

== Broadcast ==
The series airs worldwide on Disney Channel. An 11-minute preview was shown on September 3, 2010, following the Disney Channel Original Movie, Camp Rock 2: The Final Jam. The show premiered in the United States on Disney Channel on September 24, 2010, and on Disney XD on February 19, 2011.

The show previewed in Canada on September 3, 2010, and premiered on September 25, 2010. In the United Kingdom and Ireland, it premiered on November 6, 2010. It previewed in Australia and New Zealand on October 2, 2010, and premiered on November 23, 2010. In Latin America and Brazil, the series premiered on December 8, 2010. In Southeast Asia, the show premiered on April 1, 2011. It previewed on January 15, 2011, and premiered on February 13, 2011, in South Africa.

The entire series was released on Disney+ on April 3, 2020.

== Reception ==
Fish Hooks was met with mixed reviews. In The Encyclopedia of American Animated Television Shows, David Perlmutter wrote, "While this program started out well, given the veteran talent involved, it quickly faltered, becoming so obsessed with plotting the minutiae of its own self-created fishbowl universe that it abruptly lost its creative touch." He criticized the voice acting as "incredibly shrill; loud; and, above all, hammy," and said that the show "was a shotgun wedding between the typically hyperspace-paced narrative approaches of Cartoon Network [...] and the more measured and balanced style typical of Disney." In a more positive review, a reviewer for Common Sense Media said that it was entertaining and that it "(gives) many life lessons having to do with friendship and following dreams."

=== Awards and nominations ===
Year	Association	Category	Nominee	Result	Refs
2011	Environmental Media Awards	Children's Television	"Legend of the Earth Troll"	Nominated	
2011	British Academy Children's Awards	International	Maxwell Atoms, Noah Z. Jones	Won	
2012	Annie Awards	Writing in a Television Production	Blake Lemons; William Reiss; C. H. Greenblatt; Derek Evanick; Diana Lafyatis (for "Fish School Musical")	Nominated	
2012	Kids' Choice Awards Argentina	Best Animated Series	Fish Hook	Nominated	

== Canceled revival ==
A revival of Fish Hooks was planned for Disney+ in 2020; however, the series was canceled due to Kyle Massey's criminal charges and Justin Roiland's allegations of sexual assault.
