= Kevin Michael Richardson =

American actor (born 1964)

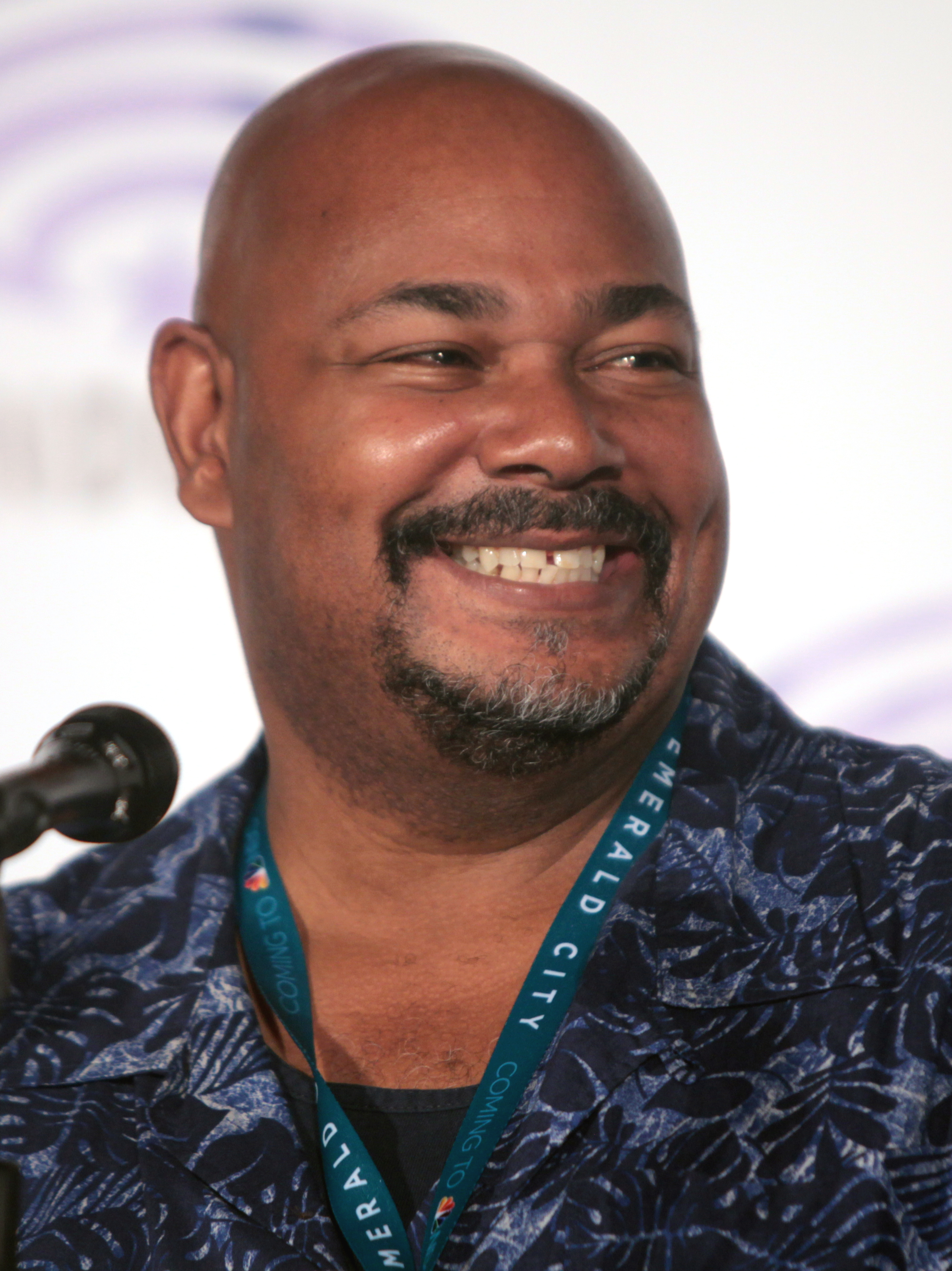
- Richardson at the 2016 WonderCon
- Born: October 25, 1964 (age 62); New York City, U.S.
- Other names: Kevin M. Richardson; Kevin Richardson
- Education: Syracuse University (BFA)
- Occupation: Actor
- Years active: 1992–present
- Spouse: Monica Richardson (m. 2006)

Kevin Michael Richardson (born October 25, 1964) is an American actor. Known for his distinctively deep voice, he has mostly voiced villainous characters in animation and video games. In film, Richardson voiced Goro in Mortal Kombat (1995) and Mortal Kombat Legends: Scorpion's Revenge (2020), Captain Gantu in the Lilo & Stitch franchise, Mr. Gus from Uncle Grandpa, Deus Ex Machina in The Matrix Revolutions (2003), and Shnitzel in the pilot for Chowder. He has also voiced characters on Seth MacFarlane's shows Family Guy, The Cleveland Show, and American Dad!, as well as several characters on Matt Groening's shows The Simpsons and Futurama.

Richardson voiced various characters in shows based on DC Comics properties, including the Joker in The Batman (for which he received two Daytime Emmy Award nominations) and Trigon, Mammoth, and See-More in both Teen Titans and Teen Titans Go!. Additionally, he played Antauri in Super Robot Monkey Team Hyperforce Go!, Oroku Saki/the Shredder in the 2012 series of Teenage Mutant Ninja Turtles, Bulkhead from Transformers: Prime, and Stump Smash and Tree Rex in the Skylanders video game series. His other notable roles include F Is for Family, Barney Rubble in The Flintstones: On the Rocks, the Mauler Twins and Monster Girl in Invincible, and Chairman Drek in the video game Ratchet & Clank.

== Early life ==
Kevin Michael Richardson was born to Jamaican immigrant parents on October 25, 1964, in the Bronx, New York City. He is the youngest of 5 siblings.He was inspired to become an actor as a child by watching Flip Wilson, James Earl Jones and Laurence Olivier. Richardson attended St Francis Preparatory School in Pennsylvania and was selected for the National Foundation on the Arts and the Humanities in 1982. He earned a Bachelor of Fine Arts in theater from Syracuse University in 1988.

== Career ==
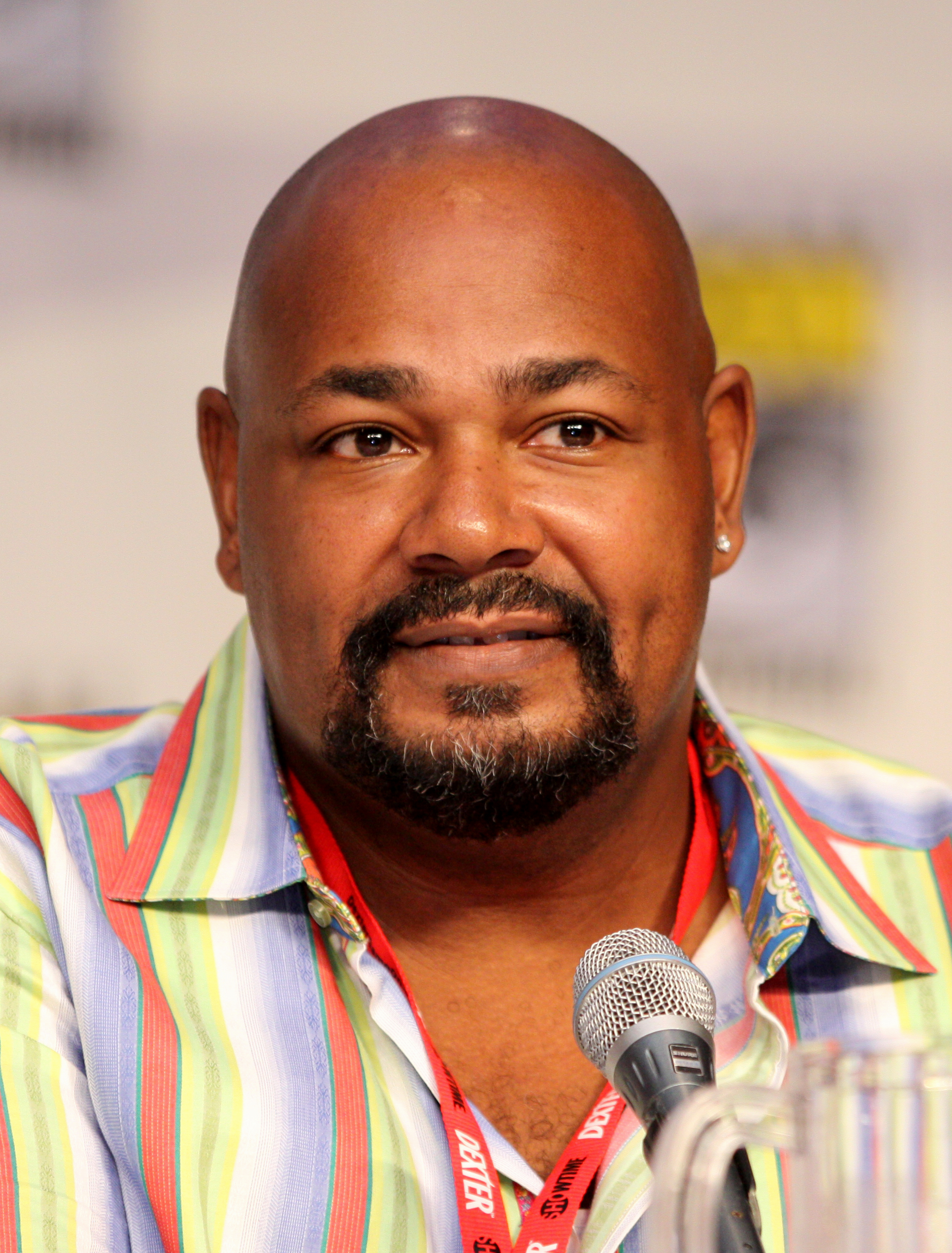
Richardson at the 2010 San Diego Comic-Con

Richardson began his live-action acting career in New York City, where he performed in commercials. His first professional acting job was in an AT&T commercial. He was frequently hired as a voice for television commercials. He later moved to Los Angeles. He has usually portrayed villainous characters due to his deep and powerful voice. In 1995, he obtained his first voice role as Mayor Tilton on the animated television version of The Mask. Additionally, early in his career, he appeared in a PBS special directed by John Houseman.

Richardson's other credits include Captain Gantu in Lilo & Stitch and its franchise, Shnitzel in the Chowder pilot (and was later replaced by John DiMaggio), Goro in Mortal Kombat, the second voice of Skulker on Danny Phantom, Sarevok in the Baldur's Gate series, Jolee Bindo in Star Wars: Knights of the Old Republic, Crunch Bandicoot in the Crash Bandicoot games, Sai Sahan in Elder Scrolls Online MMORPG series, Tartarus from Halo 2, Chairman Drek in Ratchet & Clank, Antauri in Super Robot Monkey Team Hyperforce Go!, Openly Gator from Queer Duck, Doctor Payne and others on The Proud Family, Dark Laser on The Fairly OddParents, Maurice from The Penguins of Madagascar (replacing Cedric the Entertainer), Slam Tasmanian and Tech E. Coyote on Loonatics Unleashed, and the voice of Exile in the 1990s animated series Road Rovers.

Richardson replaced Keith David as the voice of Tombstone on The Spectacular Spider-Man. He provided a character voice set for Icewind Dale: Heart of Winter and Icewind Dale II. He was the voice of Heihachi in the PlayStation 2 game Soul Calibur II, though he is listed in the role as Victor Stone. He also voiced Stump Smash and Tree Rex in Skylanders: Swap Force, Skylanders: Trap Team, and Skylanders: SuperChargers.

In 2001, Richardson voiced Barney Rubble in the animated movie The Flintstones: On the Rocks. In 2004, he became the first Black actor to portray the Joker, voicing the character on the animated series The Batman, a role for which he was twice nominated for the Daytime Emmy Award for Outstanding Performer in an Animated Program. In 2005, he voiced Trigon on the animated series Teen Titans, taking over the role from Keith Szarabajka.

In 2006, he appeared in the comedy Clerks II in which he plays a cop who notices the words "Porch Monkey 4 Life" written on the back of Randal Graves' work jacket; he also voiced the elder dragon Terrador from The Legend of Spyro game series. In 2008, he performed the voice of Bishop for Wolverine and the X-Men. Later, he did the voice of Nick Fury on The Super Hero Squad Show. He also voiced Tyro in Nickelodeon's Avatar: The Last Airbender in 2004.

Richardson often plays characters based on comedian Bill Cosby, such as on Family Guy ("Brian Does Hollywood"); as Cosby himself on The Boondocks; and Numbuh 5's father Mr. Lincoln, an homage to Cosby on Codename: Kids Next Door.

His most frequent role on Family Guy is Jerome, Lois's ex-boyfriend. He was also the voice of Cleveland Brown Jr., Lester Krinklesac, and numerous others on The Cleveland Show. He currently voices Principal Brian Lewis on American Dad! and is the current voice for Dr. Hibbert replacing Harry Shearer on The Simpsons. His voice roles in 2011 included Panthro in the Thundercats series, Martian Manhunter on Young Justice and Bulkhead, one of the Autobots in Transformers: Prime. He played Kilowog in Green Lantern: Rise of the Manhunters, the video game sequel to the live-action film Green Lantern and later reprised the role in Green Lantern: The Animated Series and Young Justice.

He was nominated for Voice Actor of the Year by Behind the Voice Actors in 2012 and in 2013.

In September 2013, he provided the voice of Mr. Gus on the Cartoon Network show Uncle Grandpa. In 2015, he did the voice of a Nigerian king on The Simpsons episode "The Princess Guide". Later, he provided the voice of Judge Michaels in Tyler Perry's first animated film, Madea's Tough Love. In 2021, he provided the voice of Jimbo in The Boss Baby: Back in Business (2018), the sequel to the 2017 film The Boss Baby.

In 2019, he was nominated for a Primetime Emmy for Outstanding Character Voice-Over Performance for F Is For Family.

== Personal life ==
Richardson lives in Los Angeles with his wife, Monica, whom he married in 2006. He is the stepfather of her two sons from a previous marriage.
