= The Froggy Apple Crumple Thumpkin =

- Chowder episode
- Episode no.: Season 1 Episode 2a
- Directed by: Juli Hashiguchi
- Story by: C.H. Greenblatt
- Editing by: Illya Owens (picture/on-line); Suzie Vlcek (animatic)
- Production code: 101a
- Original air date: November 2, 2007

Episode chronology
← Previous "Shnitzel Makes a Deposit"	Next → "Chowder's Girlfriend"

"The Froggy Apple Crumple Thumpkin" is the pilot episode of the American animated television series Chowder. Storyboarded by series creator C.H. Greenblatt from a story written by Greenblatt and directed by Juli Hashiguchi, it originally aired on Cartoon Network in the United States on November 2, 2007.

The series follows the adventures of the young title character as an apprentice at Mung Daal Catering. In this episode, Chowder, Mung Daal, and Shnitzel try to accomplish an order for a "froggy apple crumple thumpkin", a dish with a highly complex and difficult recipe.

"The Froggy Apple Crumple Thumpkin", along with other early Chowder episodes, received mixed reviews from critics. Its writing was unfavorably compared to SpongeBob SquarePants, Greenblatt's previous show as writer, and criticisms were aimed at its unrefined comedy or "noisiness", though some gave praise to the characters and the episode's fourth wall-breaking humor.

== Plot ==
Chowder, a nine-year-old cat-bear-rabbit hybrid, retrieves two bags of food from the Marzipan city market and journeys back to Mung Daal Catering. Getting tired from lifting the bags, he uses a piston to launch himself towards his destination. Meanwhile, Truffles receives a call from a ordering customer. As Truffles calls for her husband Mung to get her order pad, Chowder crashes through the roof and lands next to her, thus she hands Chowder the order instead.

Mung and Shnitzel, the latter a rock monster assistant, are waiting in the main kitchen as Chowder enters with the two bags and the order for a "froggy apple crumple thumpkin". As Mung notices that the two bags seem smaller than they should be, Chowder admits to snacking a bit on his way back, and proceeds to regurgitate the things he ate. With the mess Chowder has made, Schnitzel steps out of frame and shakes away the clutter from the screen. Mung begins to prepare the order by consulting the gigantic "Big Book of Recipes", as its recipe is at an "advanced level" and Mung has not made the dish in centuries.

For step one, Mung introduces the "no-fruit" (based on tofu) to Chowder. Once a leaf is pulled off, the no-fruit cycles through various types of fruit, and by hitting it at just the right moment, a chef can bring forth the desired fruit. As Mung, Chowder, and Shnitzel tries to turn no-fruits into apples, Chowder excessively hits an already-altered no-fruit, which leads to its transformation into a violent critter that proceeds to attack Shnitzel. For step two, Mung gives to Chowder the meat from a twelve-legged cave frog. Chowder accidentally places the meat into a chipper machine before removing the explosive stink sac; once the sac comes out, Chowder tries to taste it, only for it to start beeping. Chowder throws it away, with the sac landing on Shnitzel and exploding into pungent gas. After 67 steps, the final step involves a thumb wrestling match with the dish. Meanwhile, the customer has arrived to retrieve his order.

The dish proves too difficult for Mung to defeat, so he tags in Chowder. Overwhelmed, Chowder panics and runs away until Mung reminds him that a chef must always taste a dish before serving it. Encouraged, Chowder regains his confidence and takes a bite, which defeats the dish. However, he quickly becomes overindulgent and tries to eat the entire thing. Despite this, the dish manages to carry itself to the customer while Mung holds Chowder back. After the customer leaves satisfied, Mung and Truffles celebrate their success—only for Chowder to consume the entire screen and exit.

== Release ==
"The Froggy Apple Crumple Thumpkin" originally aired on Cartoon Network in the United States on November 2, 2007.

The episode was first released on DVD in the "Chowder: Vol. 1" set on November 4, 2008.

== Critical response ==
The episode, alongside other early Chowder episodes, received mixed reviews from critics.

Mike Hale of The New York Times gave Chowder's first two episodes (four segments), which includes "The Froggy Apple Crumple Thumpkin", a negative review. Though he recognized that the episodes has some "nice flourishes" such as artistic images of real food reminiscent of Giuseppe Arcimboldo paintings and the fourth wall-breaking gag involving Shnitzel shaking the screen to remove a mess, he wrote that "it's no 'SpongeBob.' The writing lacks bite and resonance; instead of possessing antic charm, it's merely antic." Hale also expressed concern towards the allotting large portions of time to "vomit, spit and gas", and criticized the show overall as simply bland.

Paul Pritchard of DVD Verdict, in reviewing ten early segments of the series' on the "Chowder: Vol. 1" DVD set, also shared the sentiment that the show is generally inferior to SpongeBob, with Greenblatt's connection to the latter series "prov[ing] to be both a blessing and a curse for Greenblatt's labor of love." However, he realized that upon rewatching the ten episodes, the characters were what made Chowder engaging, with the title character of Chowder being "instantly likeable". Pritchard concluded that the show in itself is fun, even if at this early stage is "still finding its feet". Jeffrey Kauffman of DVD Talk also reviewed Chowder's volume one set, giving it three out of five stars and stating that "While there are some laugh out loud moments with some creative ideas [...], there's still a bit of rampant noisiness here [...] in the place of well developed comedy."
