= William Reiss =

American animator, writer

- Born: William Reiss
- Occupations: Artist, animator, writer, director, actor
- Years active: 1999–present

William Reiss is an American animator, storyboard artist, and writer.

== Career ==
Reiss first worked on the Nickelodeon series SpongeBob SquarePants as an assistant storyboard artist in Season 1 as Bill Reiss, (Note: Information is taken from the ending credits of the episodes.) then got promoted to a writer and storyboard artist in Season 2 while still being called "Bill Reiss" by other crew members. Reiss left the show during the fourth season in 2005, but briefly returned in 2009 to storyboard the main title for the 10th Anniversary special, Truth or Square.

After SpongeBob, he went to work for Cartoon Network and worked as a storyboard artist for certain shows at that network. He is best known for teaming up with former SpongeBob writer C. H. Greenblatt to serve as creative director on his cartoon Chowder.

They later worked as directors for Fish Hooks, which he co-developed with Alex Hirsch for Noah Z. Jones for Disney Channel. After Fish Hooks, he worked on Mickey Mouse as a writer, storyboard artist and director.

In 2016, Reiss worked on C.H. Greenblatt's new series for Nickelodeon, Harvey Beaks.

In 2025, Reiss was listed amongst the animation industry workers who had lost their homes due to the January 2025 Southern California wildfires.

== Filmography ==
=== Television ===
Year	Title	Role	Notes
1999–2005; 2009; 2021	SpongeBob SquarePants	N/A	Assistant Storyboard Artist (Season 1), Writer (Season 2), Storyboard Artist (Seasons 2–4), & Main Title Storyboard (Truth or Square)
2003	Free for All	N/A	Storyboard Artist
2003	Whatever Happened to... Robot Jones?	N/A	Writer & Storyboard Artist
2004–2005	Higglytown Heroes	N/A	Storyboard Artist
2005	The Grim Adventures of Billy & Mandy	N/A	Story & Storyboard Artist ("Wild Parts")
2005	Camp Lazlo	N/A	Storyboard Revisionist
2005–2007	My Gym Partner's a Monkey	N/A	Writer, Storyboard Artist, & Storyboard Supervisor
2007–2010	Chowder	Monster, Princess, Two-Headed Weirdo. Forearm Weirdo, Luteman, & Bug No. 2	Creative Director, Story, Storyboard Artist, & voice actor
2010–2014	Fish Hooks	Chloe	Developer, Writer, Story, Storyboard Artist, director, & voice actor
2014–2016	Mickey Mouse	N/A	Writer, Storyboard Artist, director, & voice actor
2016–2017	Harvey Beaks	N/A	Storyboard Artist (2016), writer, Storyboard Director, & Supervising Producer (2017)
2018	Unikitty!	N/A	Director ("R & Arr" & "Beach Daze")
2019	Middle School Moguls	N/A	Director & Voice Director
2022	The Wonderful World of Mickey Mouse	N/A	Director, writer, & Storyboard Artist

=== Film ===
Year	Title	Role	Notes
2007	What's Wrong with Ruth?	Beet Boop & Goat No. 3	Character Designer, Color Stylist, Effects Designer, Prop Designer, writer, Storyboard Artist, & executive Producer
2016	PINK: The Lighter Shade of Red	–	Special thanks
2020	The SpongeBob Movie: Sponge on the Run	–	Storyboard Punch-Up
