= Doom with a View =

Doom with a View may refer to:

- "Doom with a View", an episode of Ruby Gloom TV series
- "Doom with a View", an episode of Murder, She Wrote TV series
- "Doom with a View", an episode of My Life as a Teenage Robot television series
