= List of My Life as a Teenage Robot episodes =

My Life as a Teenage Robot is an American animated science fiction superhero comedy television series created by Rob Renzetti for Nickelodeon. It was produced by Frederator Incorporated and Nickelodeon Animation Studios, with Rough Draft Korea providing the animation services. Set in the fictional town of Tremorton, the series follows the adventures of a robot superheroine named XJ-9 (or "Jenny Wakeman", as she prefers to be called), who attempts to juggle her duties of protecting Earth while trying to live a normal human life as a teenage girl.

A pilot for the series, entitled "My Neighbor Was a Teenage Robot", aired as a segment of an episode of Oh Yeah! Cartoons on December 4, 1999. The series was produced from March 2002 to April 2006, and it originally aired in the United States on Nickelodeon from August 1, 2003, to September 9, 2005. The third season aired in Asia from January 13, 2006, to March 30, 2007, and later in the United States from October 4, 2008, to May 2, 2009, on Nicktoons. A total of 40 episodes (76 segments) were produced over the course of three seasons. The entire series is available on DVD and digital purchase.

== Series overview ==
Season	Segments	Episodes	Originally released		
Season	Segments	Episodes	First released	Last released	Network
Pilot			December 4, 1999		Nickelodeon
1	26	13	August 1, 2003	February 27, 2004	Nickelodeon
2	24	14	December 8, 2004	September 9, 2005	Nickelodeon
3	26	13	October 4, 2008 (Note: The third and final season originally aired in Asia from January 13, 2006 to March 30, 2007, and later in the United States on Nicktoons from October 4, 2008 to May 2, 2009.)	May 2, 2009	Nicktoons (U.S.)

== Episodes ==
=== Pilot (1999) ===
A pilot for the series, entitled "My Neighbor Was a Teenage Robot", originally aired as a segment in an episode of the Nickelodeon series Oh Yeah! Cartoons on December 4, 1999.

Title	Directed by	Storyboard by	Original release date
"My Neighbor Was a Teenage Robot"	Rob Renzetti	Alex Kirwan & Rob Renzetti	December 4, 1999
After accidentally throwing the baseball into the window of a house next door, Brad Carbuckle sends his brother, Tuck to retrieve the ball, but he meets a robot girl named XJ-9 (she calls herself "Jenny") who gives him the baseball, scaring the pants off of him. Then, he tells his brother there's a robot inside, but he doesn't believe him. Jenny belongs to a scientist named Dr. Nora Wakeman, who wants her to save the world, but she meets Brad, sneaks out, and then hangs out, but Tuck is still afraid of her.

=== Season 1 (2003–04) ===
The series entered pre-production in 2001, and production of the first season lasted from March to November 2002.

26 episode segments (13 half-hours) were produced for the first season.

No. overall	No. in season	Title	Directed by	Storyboard by	Original release date	Prod. code	K2–11 viewers (in millions)
1a	1a	"It Came from Next Door"	Rob Renzetti	Alex Kirwan & Rob Renzetti	August 1, 2003	102–004	1.84
Jenny makes her first contact with the outside world, meeting Brad and Tuck Carbuckle for the first time. While Brad immediately accepts Jenny as a new friend, Tuck does not quite see her as anything other than an "evil robot cyborg".
1b	1b	"Pest Control"	Tim Walker & Rob Renzetti	Chris Mitchell	August 1, 2003	102–005	1.84
Having vowed revenge on her for all the injustices placed upon them, Dr. Wakeman's mutant lab rats, led by the evil genius Vladimir, also known as Mr. Scruffles, plan to destroy her by taking control of Jenny's body.
2a	2a	"Raggedy Android"	Tim Walker & Rob Renzetti	Alex Kirwan & Rob Renzetti	August 8, 2003	102–002	N/A
Jenny wants to go to the town fair, but Dr. Wakeman fears that Jenny will spook the townspeople with her presence. When Jenny gets a hold of a prototype "exo-skin" for her to wear, she sees her chance to mingle with the fairgoers; unfortunately, its mangled appearance only scares them. Meanwhile, Tuck attempts to conquer his fear of Ferris wheels.
2b	2b	"Class Action"	Tim Walker & Rob Renzetti	Brandon Kruse	August 8, 2003	102–006	N/A
On her first day of high school, Jenny seeks to make some new friends, and she thinks she can find some in the arrogant Brit and Tiff Crust. Unfortunately, the Crust cousins do not share the same feelings and plan to humiliate her.
3a	3a	"Attack of the 5½ Ft. Geek"	Tim Walker & Rob Renzetti	Ashley Lenz	August 15, 2003	102–009	N/A
When Jenny saves local school geek Sheldon from a gang of bullies, he quickly becomes smitten with her and won't leave her alone.
3b	3b	"Doom with a View"	Tim Walker & Rob Renzetti	Brandon Kruse	August 15, 2003	102–012	N/A
A simple snowball battle between Jenny, Brad, and Tuck is interrupted by a strange robot ambassador who wants to make Jenny the newest member of the Cluster, a legion of robots headquartered on the planet Cluster Prime that plans to enslave humans for manual labor. When she refuses, the ambassador commences war against her.
4a	4a	"Ear No Evil"	Tim Walker & Rob Renzetti	Mary Hanley	August 22, 2003	102–008	N/A
Jenny wants to get ear piercings, but her mother refuses to give her ears. Sheldon offers to step in and help, but the ears he builds end up being disproportionately large on Jenny's head.
4b	4b	"Unlicensed Flying Object"	Rob Renzetti	Brandon Kruse	August 22, 2003	102–001	N/A
Brad is disappointed by his lack of a driver's license, and Jenny's attempts to help him. Soon, he takes up joyriding in abandoned UFOs as a new hobby.
5a	5a	"Party Machine"	Tim Walker & Rob Renzetti	Carlos Ramos	September 5, 2003	102–017	N/A
Jenny and Brad's secret party is a hit, but between keeping the party-goers under control, keeping the house in one piece, and keeping a group of tiny multiplying aliens from invading Earth, Jenny has her hands full.
5b	5b	"Speak No Evil"	Tim Walker & Rob Renzetti	Chris Mitchell & Rob Renzetti	September 5, 2003	102–014	N/A
While on a mission in Japan, Jenny winds up losing one of her language system discs for English speech. Unable to switch off from speaking in full Japanese, she encounters problems in speaking to people. She uses this to her advantage, however, to make peace with a Japanese creature that grows with and is hurt by water.
6a	6a	"See No Evil"	Rob Renzetti	Chuck Klein	September 12, 2003	102–011	1.90
Dr. Wakeman is proud of her newest enhancement for Jenny: multi-functional eyes that can see anything in any view. Jenny likes them until she sees how they look on her. She refuses to use them and fumbles around town without any sight until she finally realizes she needs them to fight an invisible villain.
6b	6b	"The Great Unwashed"	Tim Walker & Rob Renzetti	Bernie Petterson	September 12, 2003	102–007	1.90
Jenny has been invited to her handsome classmate Don Prima's latest party, and she has gotten a tune-up and a new paint job just for the occasion. However, Brit and Tiff are ready to do anything to sabotage Jenny's chances to impress at the party.
7a	7a	"The Return of Raggedy Android"	Rob Renzetti	Chris Mitchell & Rob Renzetti	September 19, 2003	102–010	1.85
The owner of Mezmer's, a popular hangout spot for teens all over town, enforces a strict "No Robots" policy. Desperate to get in, Jenny dons the new and improved exo-skin to pass off as a beautiful human teenage girl. However, the exo-skin turns out to have a mind of its own and refuses to let Jenny take it off or fight a group of alien space bikers.
7b	7b	"The Boy Who Cried Robot"	Bob Jaques & Rob Renzetti	Mary Hanley	September 19, 2003	102–003	1.85
Tuck keeps interrupting Jenny's daily activity for every possible favor. When a big problem arises, however, Tuck's call for help winds up going ignored.
8a	8a	"Sibling Tsunami"	Tim Walker & Rob Renzetti	Mary Hanley	October 3, 2003	102–013	N/A
When Jenny finds and reactivates her "sisters"–early XJ prototypes 1 through 8–she is beyond happy. Each sister has her own personality, however, and they do not all have the same level of friendliness that Jenny has.
8b	8b	"I Was a Preschool Dropout"	Randy Myers & Rob Renzetti	Brandon Kruse	October 3, 2003	102–015	N/A
Having been found to have only been activated for five years, the school system declares that Jenny has to be moved into a grade level that corresponds to her "age". Jenny finds herself being forced to adapt to kindergarten.
9a	9a	"Hostile Makeover"	Chris Sauvé & Rob Renzetti	Mary Hanley	October 24, 2003	102–018	2.24
When Jenny starts to develop face-bolts, voice changes and excess wires growing out of her body, Brad chalks it up to puberty. However, it soon becomes apparent that the "puberty" is actually the doing of Queen Vexus of the Cluster, who has infected Jenny with a virus to warp her into a loyal, Cluster-controlled monster.
9b	9b	"Grid Iron Glory"	Tim Walker & Rob Renzetti	Trevor Wall	October 24, 2003	102–016	2.24
Jenny becomes the star football player of the high school football team. At a championship game, she soon finds herself facing the former Tremorton High quarterback whom she replaced.
10a	10a	"Dressed to Kill"	Chris Sauvé & Rob Renzetti	Brandon Kruse	November 7, 2003	102–020	2.14
Thanks to a screw-up from one of his Cluster troops, Commander Smytus loses a cache of super-powered Pip Crystals to the Crust Cousins. The cousins decide to flaunt both their style and newfound powers in front of Jenny, and she must use her keen fashion sense to save herself in time.
10b	10b	"Shell Game"	John Fountain & Rob Renzetti	John Fountain	November 7, 2003	102–019	2.14
Looking to prove to Jenny that boy robots are jerks compared to him, Sheldon creates a mechanical suit and dubs himself the "Silver Shell". The plan backfires, however, when Jenny starts falling for Silver Shell.
11a	11a	"Daydream Believer"	John Fountain & Rob Renzetti	Stephen Sandoval & Chris Mitchell	November 21, 2003	102–021	N/A
As a robot, Jenny wants to experience what it is like to dream. When Dr. Wakeman installs a dream chip, Jenny's joy causes her to abuse its function and she finds herself stuck in dream mode and sleepwalking, causing mayhem in the process.
11b	11b	"This Time with Feeling"	Robert Alvarez & Rob Renzetti	Carlos Ramos	November 21, 2003	102–023	N/A
Jenny's desire to know the feeling of physical contact leads her to steal a set of artificial nerves from Dr. Wakeman. The nerves, however, have only two settings: tickle and pain. Jenny must manage these while fighting Himcules, a villain whose strength increases when he sees others in pain and diminishes at the sound of laughter.
12a	12a	"Saved by the Shell"	Ron Hughart & Rob Renzetti	Brandon Kruse	January 23, 2004	102–026	N/A
Sheldon sets Jenny up for a date with Silver Shell, in hopes that he can reveal himself to her. However, she already has a date with Don Prima, much to Sheldon's chagrin. An evil mutant fly that can eat metal attacks people in the restaurant while the date takes place, while Silver Shell tries to sabotage the date by ruining Don's expensive shoes.
12b	12b	"Tradeshow Showdown"	Ron Hughart & Rob Renzetti	Bernie Petterson	January 23, 2004	102–022	N/A
Jenny is stuck going to a robot convention with Dr. Wakeman. Snubbed by all the other robots and insulted by Dr. Wakeman's rival, Dr. Phineas Mogg, Jenny finds herself going to a robot called Vee for comfort. However, "Vee" is actually Vexus in disguise, seeking to recruit new Cluster members.
13a	13a	"The Wonderful World of Wizzly"	Chris Sauvé & Ron Renzetti	Chris Dent	February 27, 2004	102–024	N/A
Jenny gets a chance to visit the theme park Wizzly World with Brad and Tuck, and she cannot help but think that the robots in the park feel miserable. When Jenny breaks them out of the park, however, chaos ensues.
13b	13b	"Call Hating"	Tim Walker & Rob Renzetti	Ed Baker	February 27, 2004	102–025	N/A
When Jenny hangs up on Dr. Wakeman one too many times, the doctor desperately reprograms Jenny's communicator to make Jenny unable to turn it off.

=== Season 2 (2004–05) ===
Production of the second season lasted from January 2004 to March 2005. "Victim of Fashion" was the first episode produced for the season, and "Escape from Cluster Prime" was the last.

20 11-minute episode segments, two 22-minute specials, and a 45-minute TV movie were produced for the second season, totaling 14 half-hours.

Note: All episodes in this season were directed by Chris Sauvé and Rob Renzetti, with the exceptions of "Escape from Cluster Prime", which was directed by Chris Savino and Rob Renzetti, and "Robot Riot", which was directed by John Fountain and Rob Renzetti.

No. overall	No. in season	Title	Storyboard by	Original release date	Prod. code
14	1	"Victim of Fashion"	Alex Kirwan & Brandon Kruse	September 6, 2005	201
Not to be outdone by each other, a fashion war erupts between Jenny and the Crust cousins. Brit and Tiff employ psychological warfare by making Jenny feel self-conscious about her weight, so she urges Sheldon to make her as light as possible, which results in giving up her weapons and armor.
15a	2a	"Last Action Zero"	John Fountain	January 25, 2005	202a
Brad gets a chance to join the Skyway Patrol in hopes that he can help Jenny in her duties. However, he soon finds himself stuck with nothing but paperwork and paper cuts at his new job.
15b	2b	"Mind Over Matter"	Brandon Kruse	January 25, 2005	202b
After being lectured about planned obsolescence by Brad, and later finding herself unable to defeat the energy vampire Gigawatt, Jenny fears being rendered an obsolete robot. Determined to beat Gigawatt, she soon tries to "upgrade" herself to make up for her weaknesses against Gigawatt.
16a	3a	"Future Shock"	Brandon Kruse	January 24, 2005	203a
When Tuck takes a look into Dr. Wakeman's "Future Scope" and sees a vision which leads him to believe that Jenny will kill Brad, he takes all costs to stop Brad from leaving for a drive-in movie showing.
16b	3b	"Humiliation 101"	Bernie Petterson	January 24, 2005	203b
Dr. Wakeman is coming to Tremorton High to speak at a special science assembly about Jenny. Fearing humiliation, Jenny tries to prevent her mother from talking at the assembly.
17a	4a	"Love 'Em or Leash 'Em"	Gabe Swarr	January 26, 2005	204a
Jenny's new boyfriend, a male robot named Kenny built by Dr. Wakeman's rival Dr. Mogg (who copies many of Dr. Wakeman's inventions while adding distinctive twists), seems to be the perfect match for her at first; however, Kenny soon starts to display oddly dog-like characteristics. Meanwhile, the new couple attracts Sheldon's jealousy.
17b	4b	"Teen Team Time"	Kelly Armstrong	January 26, 2005	204b
The Teen Team has come to Earth, and they are quite impressed with Jenny's abilities. Jenny seems more than excited to join, but finds herself ignoring her other friends in favor of a group of heroes that are mostly prejudiced against "normal people".
18	5	"A Robot for All Seasons"	John Fountain & Brandon Kruse	December 8, 2004	205
Jenny is unwittingly programmed for evil against her will by a spoiled child named Todd Sweeney, who uses her to ruin the holidays for all of Tremorton. When she returns to normal, she discovers that the entire town has turned against her, and nobody believes her pleas of innocence, except for the one person that worships her like a goddess - Sheldon. Todd, however, still intends to use her to ruin the year's biggest holiday—Christmas.
19a	6a	"Pajama Party Prankapalooza"	Heather Martinez	January 27, 2005	206a
Jenny has managed to get herself invited to Brit and Tiff's slumber party, and, as usual, Jenny's naivety leads her to cause mischief all over town to impress the Crusts. Dr. Wakeman must stop Jenny before Skyway Patrol can catch up to her daughter.
19b	6b	"Sister Sledgehammer"	Mike Kunkel	January 27, 2005	206b
It is currently unknown what had happened to Commander Smytus returning to his normal size, where he has actually succeeded in assimilating Jenny into the Cluster, and has turned her into a massive metal monster. Having been awakened due to Jenny being in crisis, will the rest of the XJ line come save their captive sister, or will XJ-2 through -8 get assimilated and get XJ-1 to barf some motor oil on Jenny's face upon bringing back her senses?
20a	7a	"Dancing with My Shell"	John Fountain	January 28, 2005	207a
Jenny takes the Silver Shell to the Sadie Hawkins school dance, and Sheldon hopes that he can impress Jenny enough to reveal his identity to her. Everything starts going wrong, however, when Letta and the Space Bikers crash the dance.
20b	7b	"Around the World in Eighty Pieces"	Bernie Petterson	January 28, 2005	207b
Crackerjack Cluster inventor Krackus has managed to scatter Jenny's parts all over the world, and Brad, Tuck, and Sheldon must put their friend back together before Krackus can call Vexus on his success.
21a	8a	"Armagedroid"	Tom King	March 25, 2005	208a
Armagedroid—once a powerful global protector programmed to disarm and destroy all weapons before he went rogue—returns to Tremorton, and Jenny finds herself unable to stop such a huge robot.
21b	8b	"Killgore"	Dave Thomas	March 25, 2005	208b
Killgore, a small wind-up robot, hopes to kidnap Jenny in hopes of impressing the Cluster, but no one can resist his unintentionally cutesy appearance.
22a	9a	"A Pain in My Sidekick"	Bernie Petterson	June 23, 2005	209a
Tuck admires the Silver Shell, so he manages to convince Sheldon into making him Silver Shell's faithful sidekick, the Tin Can. Being a sidekick is not quite what he expects, though.
22b	9b	"Crash Pad Crash"	Heather Martinez	June 23, 2005	209b
Jenny's new "bachelor pad" is the new hot spot in town, but her new party lifestyle begins to interfere with her own personal duties.
23a	10a	"Designing Women"	Brandon Kruse	September 7, 2005	210a
Looking to find a way into Jenny's heart, Sheldon steals a set of XJ-9 schematics from Dr. Wakeman. Vexus, however, also has eyes for the schematics, and is willing to disguise herself as "QT2" to trick Sheldon into giving them to her.
23b	10b	"Robot Riot"	John Fountain	September 7, 2005	210b
Jenny gives in to Tuck's request to be his entry for the hit robot combat competition "Robot Wars", despite finding the event barbaric.
24a	11a	"Bradventure"	John Fountain	September 8, 2005	211a
Tired of being stuck under Jenny's shadow, Brad sets out to be his own hero. However, he finds himself in hot water when he runs afoul of the scientist Dr. Locus and his daughter Melody. Locus wants the XJ-9 schematics for reasons yet unknown and when Jenny gets knocked out in battle, Brad has to prove himself.
24b	11b	"Mama Drama"	Heather Martinez	September 8, 2005	211b
Jenny is convinced that Dr. Wakeman's new boyfriend is a psychopath.
25a	12a	"Toying with Jenny"	Brandon Kruse	September 9, 2005	212a
The brand-new "Action Jenny" toys are a huge success, and Jenny finds herself taken in by the fame. However, they soon turn out to be Vexus and Krackus' newest plan to conquer the world.
25b	12b	"Teenage Mutant Ninja Troubles"	Chris Dent & John Fountain	September 9, 2005	212b
Due to internal disputes, the Teen Team has broken up. With no place left to go, Misty heads back to Earth to be with Jenny. Teased at school by the Crust cousins for her appearance, Misty convinces Jenny to get back at them through a prank war.
26–27	13–14	"Escape from Cluster Prime"	Bryan Andrews, Brandon Kruse, Heather Martinez, & Chris Reccardi; John Fountain & Alex Kirwan (additional storyboards)	August 12, 2005	213-214
Scorned by Tremorton after ruining the town's 300th-anniversary celebrations during a fight with Vexus, Jenny gets fed up with being unappreciated by humans and soon finds herself in Cluster Prime, the capital of Vexus' empire. She finally gets a chance to live with other robots like her but soon discovers there's more to Cluster Prime than meets the eye. Note: This is a quadruple-length special.

=== Season 3 (2005–09) ===
Production of the third and final season lasted from January 2005 to April 2006. The show was cancelled halfway through production in October 2005. "Weapons of Mass Distraction" was the first episode produced for the season.

On October 12, 2006, Nickelodeon announced that season 3 was set to air in 2007 on Nicktoons Network in the United States. However, it ended up being delayed until October 2008.

26 episode segments (13 half-hours) were produced for season 3.

No. overall	No. in season	Title	Directed by	Storyboard by	Original Canada/U.K./Australia air date	Original U.S. air date	Prod. code
28a	1a	"Weapons of Mass Distraction"	Chris Savino, Chris Sauvé & Rob Renzetti	Heather Martinez	November 6, 2005	October 4, 2008	301a
Jenny has a crush on a new kid named Travis, but there's only one problem: Travis is afraid of anything mechanical. Note: The scene with Travis' father in the factory is based on the Charlie Chaplin motion picture, "Modern Times".
28b	1b	"There's No Place Like Home School"	Ray Pointer, Greg Miller & Bob Nesler	Bernie Petterson	November 6, 2005	October 4, 2008	301b
Jenny gets homeschooled by Dr. Wakeman due to a mishap at school involving a student and a trashcan. Jenny may not like it, but her mother enjoys the chance to teach her daughter... perhaps too much.
29a	2a	"No Harmony with Melody"	Robert Alvarez & Rob Renzetti	John Fountain	November 13, 2005	October 5, 2008	302a
Melody returns to Tremorton, and Brad begins spending more time with her. Is Jenny merely getting jealous, or is Melody more of a discord than she seems?
29b	2b	"Tuckered Out"	Greg Miller & Rob Renzetti	Heather Martinez	November 13, 2005	October 5, 2008	302b
If Tuck doesn't pass his next assignment, he will repeat the second grade. His assignment: a project on his personal hero. His subject: Jenny. His project: create a movie centering on Jenny's life. His personality: too enthusiastic for anyone to stand. Along with a generous amount of creative license.
30a	3a	"Stage Fright"	Robert Alvarez & Rob Renzetti	Bryan Andrews	November 20, 2005	February 21, 2009	303a
Jenny fails an audition for the school play of Romeo and Juliet, due to her being a robot. However, her and the play's director's views are questioned when two different races of aliens land for a surprise visit.
30b	3b	"Never Say Uncle"	Randy Myers & Rob Renzetti	Will Finn	November 20, 2005	February 21, 2009	303b
After Nora's electrics address filer goes on the fritz, Jenny invites her distant aunt over to visit, but quickly learns that she and her sister Nora Wakeman don't quite see eye to eye.
31a	4a	"A Spoonful of Mayhem"	Chris Savino & Rob Renzetti	Chris Reccardi	November 27, 2005	October 11, 2008	304a
After a group of runaway living fruits and vegetables is stopped by Jenny, a jealous Skyway Patrol lieutenant seeks to permanently shut her down.
31b	4b	"Enclosure of Doom"	Daniel de la Vega, Monte Young & Rob Renzetti	Bryan Andrews	November 27, 2005	October 11, 2008	304b
Jenny wakes to find herself trapped in a mysterious place, where laser guns and other mechanisms meet her every move, and the only company she has is Killgore.
32a	5a	"Girl of Steal"	Robert Alvarez & Rob Renzetti	Brandon Kruse	January 22, 2006	October 18, 2008	305a
Jenny really wants a popular music player called the "Musique", but it's very expensive. So Jenny tries another method: shoplifting.
32b	5b	"Mist Opportunities"	Randy Myers & Rob Renzetti	Bernie Petterson	January 22, 2006	October 18, 2008	305b
With Misty hanging in Tremorton and doing her part in keeping the town safe (though not for free), Jenny leaves the super heroics to her and starts to slack off. But when Misty's mercenary habits clash with Jenny's views on protecting the innocent, fisticuffs break out between the two. What's going to become of their friendship?
33a	6a	"The Legion of Evil"	Chris Savino & Rob Renzetti	John Fountain	February 5, 2006	October 25, 2008	306a
Vladimir (Mr. Scruffles), Lancer, Mudslinger and the Mad Hammer Bros. form the 'Legion of Evil' to seek their shared vengeance on Jenny.
33b	6b	"The Price of Love"	Randy Myers & Rob Renzetti	Heather Martinez	February 5, 2006	October 25, 2008	306b
Sheldon tries to make Jenny jealous by paying Pteresa to be his girlfriend.
34a	7a	"Teen Idol"	Chris Sauvé & Rob Renzetti	Bernie Petterson	December 6, 2005	November 1, 2008	307a
A group of aliens worship Jenny after she is mistaken for a "comet goddess". It's fun at first but they soon drive Jenny crazy. However, when confronted, the aliens promise to leave her alone after one last ceremony. Jenny unwittingly pulls the Sun toward the Earth and uses the same ceremony in the opposite direction. She then hurls the alien's spaceship into an elliptical orbit around the Sun, turning them into a comet. The Earth is saved, but someone's missing...
34b	7b	"Good Old Sheldon"	Bob Jaques & Rob Renzetti	Brandon Kruse & Stephen Sandoval	December 6, 2005	November 1, 2008	307b
Sheldon was stuck on the aliens' ship when Jenny got rid of it (in the previous episode), and he's been spending decades trying to get back to Earth (even though it's only been a short time on Earth since he left). Now, Jenny must restore him to his proper age.
35a	8a	"Infectious Personality"	Randy Myers & Rob Renzetti	Bernie Petterson	March 12, 2006	February 21, 2009	308a
After destroying a series of asteroids that threaten to destroy the Earth, Jenny returns to earth, bringing with her a dust that severely alters the characteristics of her close friends.
35b	8b	"Trash Talk"	Randy Myers & Rob Renzetti	Brandon Kruse	March 12, 2006	February 21, 2009	308b
Jenny, Brad, and Tuck can't seem to agree over the rules of a board game. But when the boys tag along on Jenny's mission to a garbage dump asteroid, they run into Vexus, Smytus and Krackus who are stuck in the asteroid. The former Cluster Queen is looking to drain Jenny of her energy, but she and her henchbots can't agree on what to use the power for.
36a	9a	"Agent 00' Sheldon"	Randy Myers & Rob Renzetti	Heather Martinez	March 26, 2006	February 28, 2009	309a
Sheldon is recruited to become a secret agent and stumbles onto a supposed plot to destroy every last robot in Tremorton.
36b	9b	"Indes-Tuck-tible"	Chris Savino & Rob Renzetti	John Fountain	March 26, 2006	February 28, 2009	309b
After almost getting hit by a truck, Tuck becomes hyper-paranoid about everything, until Jenny shows himself in the future, perfectly healthy. Tuck realizes that he's not going to die until he lives a full life and decides to become a daredevil, seeking fame and glory. Unfortunately for Jenny, this means a lot of stopping what she's doing and saving him from his stunts.
37a	10a	"Puppet Bride"	Randy Myers & Rob Renzetti	Chuck & Wendy Grieb	April 9, 2006	February 28, 2009	310a
One of Dr. Wakeman's old creations, a robot puppet named "Li'l Acorn", tries to make Jenny his bride.
37b	10b	"Historionics"	Randy Myers & Rob Renzetti	Scott Bern	April 9, 2006	February 28, 2009	310b
Jenny, Brad, Tuck, and Sheldon end up stranded on a deserted island inhabited by hostile robotic clones of historical figures. To make matters worse, Jenny's auxiliary power is about to run out. Featuring Uncle Wizzly, based on the famous creator of the Wizzly theme parks.
38a	11a	"Ball and Chain"	Randy Myers & Rob Renzetti	Brandon Kruse	April 30, 2006	April 18, 2009	311a
Brad is getting married, but not by choice. The Space Bikers want poor Brad to get hitched to Tammy. But does Brad really want to be rescued?
38b	11b	"Labor Day"	Randy Myers & Rob Renzetti	Will Finn	April 30, 2006	April 18, 2009	311b
Skyway Patrol wants Jenny to pay for repairs to the city due to her fooling around, and now Jenny is on a desperate job hunt.
39a	12a	"Voyage to the Planet of the Bikers"	Randy Myers & Rob Renzetti	Bernie Petterson	May 19, 2006	April 25, 2009	312a
The Space Bikers have managed to rebuild Jenny into a motorcycle and now she and Tuck are en route to their hideout to demand them to change her back!
39b	12b	"Queen Bee"	Randy Myers & Rob Renzetti	Cindy Morrow	May 19, 2006	April 25, 2009	312b
Vexus is back, and with a new look. Having teamed up with Brit and Tiff, the ex-Cluster Queen is becoming quite popular in school, to the point where even the Crust Cousins can't compete.
40a	13a	"Samurai Vac"	Randy Myers & Rob Renzetti	Brandon Kruse	June 16, 2006	May 2, 2009	313a
Jenny unwittingly dishonors a Japanese vacuum robot while on a mission to Tokyo, and she must restore the robot's honor.
40b	13b	"Turncoats"	Randy Myers & Rob Renzetti	Bernie Petterson	June 16, 2006	May 2, 2009	313b
At the Invention Convention, Dr. Wakeman's latest robot goes haywire. Soon after, all the previous XJ robot models begin to attack as well. It's up to Jenny and her mother to find out why.
