= Kid Cosmic =

American animated television series

- Season 1 promotional poster
- Genre: Comedy-drama; Superhero
- Created by: Craig McCracken
- Based on: The Kid from Planet Earth by Craig McCracken
- Developed by: Craig McCracken; Francisco Angones; Lauren Faust
- Voices of: Jack Fisher; Amanda C. Miller; Lily Rose Silver; Tom Kenny; Fred Tatasciore; Keith Ferguson
- Composers: Andy Bean; Edward Underhill (S3)
- Country of origin: United States
- Original language: English
- No. of seasons: 3
- No. of episodes: 24

Production
- Executive producers: Craig McCracken; Melissa Cobb (S1)
- Producers: Dave Thomas; Lauren Faust (S2-3)
- Editors: Nico Colaleo; Jay Wade Edwards
- Running time: 14–28 minutes
- Production companies: CMCC Cartoons; Netflix Animation Studios

Original release
- Network: Netflix
- Release: February 2, 2021 – February 3, 2022

Kid Cosmic is an American animated superhero comedy-drama television series created by Craig McCracken and developed by McCracken, his wife Lauren Faust and Francisco Angones for Netflix. The series was based on his 2009 comic The Kid from Planet Earth. Produced in-house by Netflix Animation, the show is McCracken's first to have a serialized format, as well as his second foray into the superhero genre, having previously created The Powerpuff Girls. Illustrated in a "retro 2D" style inspired by comics such as Dennis the Menace and The Adventures of Tintin, the series follows Kid, a young boy who gets a chance to become a superhero and fight evil aliens alongside other characters with different abilities.

The first season of the series, titled The Local Heroes!, was released on February 2, 2021. The second season, subtitled The Intergalactic Truckstop!, was released on September 7, 2021. The third and final season, subtitled The Global Heroes!, was released on February 3, 2022.

== Plot ==
Kid Cosmic follows Kid, a 9-year-old boy who fantasizes about becoming a superhero, living in a junkyard in a thinly populated stretch of desert in New Mexico. When a spaceship crashes in the area, he discovers it has onboard five "Cosmic Stones of Power" that give him the chance of fulfilling his dream. When the stones attract alien invasions, he forms a motley team of superheroes to defend the Earth from them.

This team, with each member having a stone giving them a unique power, consists of Kid's grandpa, George "Papa G" (Old Man Many Men), who can create multiple clones of himself; Kid's friend Jo (Portal Girl), who has the ability to teleport; Rosa (Niña Gigantica), a four-year-old girl who can become a 40-foot giant; and Tuna Sandwich (The Precognitive Cat), a cat that can predict the future with a third eye on his forehead. They are accompanied by Stuck Chuck, an alien invader stranded on Earth after the destruction of his ship. Stuck Chuck's mission is to steal the Cosmic Stones for his Great Leader.

In the second season, the Local Heroes are teleported into space and have to go on a quest to find the other eight Stones of Power to fight against Erodius the Planet Killer.

In the third and final season, the Local Heroes, now the Global Heroes, find out that there is actually a fourteenth silver Cosmic Stone of Power that grants healing abilities, and learn further revelations about Erodius and the world they are currently in, requiring that they must make great sacrifices.

== Voice cast ==
=== Main ===
- Jack Fisher as Kid, a nine-year-old boy who finds the first five Stones of Power and uses them to fulfill his dream of being a superhero, and his real name is unknown. He is an orphaned kid living with his grandfather, George "Papa G", in a junkyard where he spends time reading comics and collecting curious stuff from the yard. He is motivated to be a superhero after his parents died in a car collision and feels that having powers would have allowed him to save them. In the first season, he tried to dominate the use of the green Stone of Power which he initially thought was for flying until it is later revealed to have telekinetic powers. After losing this stone to Fantos in the second season, he uses the olive green Stone, which allows him to transform into slime.
- Amanda C. Miller as Johanna "Jo", a teenage waitress at Mo's Oasis and Kid's best friend who dreams of seeing the world, and is granted the power of portal creation by the purple Stone of Power. Her hero name is Portal Girl and she is also the leader of the team. In the second season, she has to prove her leadership abilities by leading the Local Heroes to find the remaining stones and confronting Erodius. In season 3, she found out her power stone does not just create portals to places she can think of, but also to places she can imagine.
- Lily Rose Silver as Rosa Flores, a Mexican-American four-year-old girl who is granted the power to enlarge herself to gigantic proportions by the blue Stone of Power. Her hero name is La Niña Gigantica, which is Spanish for "The Gigantic Girl". She is the daughter of Ramona and Carlos Flores and a girl with a full of energy that is devoted to helping Kid and Jo in their adventures despite her young age, going to the point of recovering the Power Stones by herself. As a regular girl, she loves dinosaurs and princesses.
- Tom Kenny as Stuck Chuck, an alien who is among the first to try to steal the Stones of Power from Kid and ends up stuck with Kid's group when, as a result, he loses both his ship and legs. His name is a nickname thought up by Jo since his real name was never revealed, and he was also the one who caused the spaceship with the first five Stones of Power to crash on Earth. Initially seeking any opportunity to get the stones for his Great Leader, he reforms near the end of the first season by also providing his translator to Tuna Sandwich because he began to understand English. In season two, he works as a dishwasher in Mo's Oasis and gains the dark blue Stone of Power, granting him pain absorption. Similar to Kid, he also likes to read comics.
- Fred Tatasciore as Tuna Sandwich, a cat who resides at Mo's Oasis and to whom Kid gives the red Stone of Power, granting him the power to see glimpses of the future. His hero name is The Precognitive Cat. Tuna wears a high-tech collar that translates his speech into English, given to him by Chuck as of "The Invaders from Earth".
- Keith Ferguson as:
  - George "Papa G", Kid's hippie grandfather who encourages Kid to find nonviolent solutions to his problems, and is granted the power to clone himself by the yellow Stone of Power. His hero name is Old Man Many Men. In the third and final season, he is revealed to be 112 years old and has kept himself in good health via the silver Stone of Power, which he found as a child. Papa G gives up the silver Stone to heal Erodius, which causes him to become weak and decrepit as he regains his true age.
  - Carl, a trucker and regular at Mo's Oasis. In the second season, he gains the ability to turn invisible through the turquoise Stone of Power.
- Kim Yarbrough as Florence "Flo", Jo's mother and proprietor of Mo's Oasis. She tries to keep her business floating even when dealing with Kid Cosmic's antics, including having her diner in space. Despite that, she decides to support Jo, even if she prefers to get mentorship from Queen Xhan. She tends to use several of the Power Stones Jo finds in the second season while she never dominates the use of one. In the third season, she dominates the use of the olive green Stone, even to the point to stop Fantos a little.

=== Supporting ===
- Christian Lanz as:
  - Carlos Flores, Rosa's father and a regular at Mo's Oasis and Ramona's husband. He and his wife run a successful floral business. In the second season, he gains the white Cosmic Stone of Power, which grants the user the ability to breathe ice.
  - Carlax, an intergalactic postal worker who had been delivering the first five Stones to Fantos until he was shot down by Chuck. He later becomes a regular at Mo's after being reunited with his family and is the first customer to arrive when the Oasis reopens on Earth.
- Grey Griffin as:
  - Carla, a biker and regular at Mo's Oasis. She becomes part of the Local Heroes by getting the pink Cosmic Stone of Power that allows her to run at super speed.
  - Ramona Flores, Rosa's mother and a regular at Mo's Oasis, and the wife of Carlos. In the second season, she gains the orange Cosmic Stone of Power, which grants the user the ability to breathe fire.
  - Cadet Vinia
  - Boss Fiosa, an evil two-headed alien crime boss who possessed the orange and white Stones of Power before the Local Heroes pulled off a heist to take them from her.
- Jason Hightower as Biker in Black, the leader of Earth Force Enforcement Force who believes all aliens who come to Earth are hostile. After his defeat in the first season, he plots revenge by building a giant robot to take down the Local Heroes but was soon defeated afterwards (though this was later revealed to have occurred in the Fantasy Realm).
  - Earth Force Enforcement Force consists of Lanz as Crimson Vision, Griffin as Violet Vanish, Eric Bauza as Emerald Wing, Phil LaMarr as Golden Swarm, and Michaela Dietz as Blue Behemoth. Their colors correspond to the powers granted by the Stones of Power. They follow the Biker in Black's orders to dispose of all aliens on Earth, but when their suits are destroyed at the end of the first season, they reform themselves.
- Cree Summer as Queen Xhan, a purple jellyfish-like alien who is the former bearer of the purple Stone of Power. She ends up being the only survivor of her group of friends at the end because of Erodius. She acts as Jo's mentor in terms of leadership in the second season, and during it, she loses one of her tentacles to Fantos. It was revealed that she was not able to pull her comrades out of Erodius' gravity on time, having to run away to Earth by creating a portal. She later returns in season three, finding the Global Heroes in the vacuum of space and providing refuge to them.
- Fred Tatasciore as:
  - Great Leader, the evil, cowardly ruler of Stuck Chuck's people.
  - Gortho the Gargarian, a yellow goblin-like creature who was the former bearer of the yellow Stone of Power. He was killed by Erodius.
  - Meep, a small light blue insect-like alien who was the former bearer of the blue Stone of Power. He was killed by Erodius.
  - Hamburg, a man who works at Mo's Oasis Cafe and is usually seen with Fry. In the second season, he obtains the indigo Cosmic Stone of Power, which gives the user multiple arms.
  - General Staunch, the General of a tiny civilization. He ordered his cadets to retreat when they learn the Global Heroes lost the Cosmic Stones, but he personally gives medals to the three cadets that helped Rosa to retrieve the Cosmic Stones back from Fantos.
- Eric Bauza as:
  - Master Wilkson, a green humanoid alien with a large head and swirly eyes who was the former bearer of the green Stone of Power. He was killed by Erodius.
  - Fry, a man who works at Mo's Oasis Cafe and is usually seen together with Hamburg. In the second season, he obtains the light pink Cosmic Stone of Power, which gives the user the ability to stretch their body.
- Sam Riegel as PT-SB, a black and red robot who was the former bearer of the red Stone of Power. He was killed by Erodius.
- Bobby Moynihan as Fantos the Amassor, an evil, immature fanboy of Erodius the Planet Killer, who is obsessed with obtaining all 13 Cosmic Stones of Power in order to help Erodius destroy the universe. He also lives with his mother and goes to her for emotional support. In the third season, he is absorbed into Erodius when its surface opened up and he sank into the goo-like quicksand.
- April Winchell as Krosh, an alien warrior who was the previous champion of the Fight Hole. She allies temporally with Jo to beat Erodius but was killed by Fantos after betraying Jo to steal the Power Stones.
- Toks Olagundoye as Madame President, the leader of a tiny civilization whose planet was destroyed by Erodius, and uses a room of Mo's Oasis Cafe to rebuild their civilization. At the end of the second season, Madame President and her group escape to safety after the cafe is destroyed by Erodius.
- Nicolas Cantu as Ensign Mainstay, the second on board of the tiny civilization is cautious about the intentions of Flo until he realizes the big effort the Local Heroes did to save them.
- Phil LaMarr as Bombardier Brake
- Cathy Cavadini, Tara Strong and E. G. Daily as (respectively) Agent Pink, Agent Blue, and Agent Green of the PPG (Planet Protection Group), a government agency who first appears at the end of the second season after the destruction of Erodius. They are modeled after the eponymous characters of McCracken's first animated series, The Powerpuff Girls, and share their voice actors. In the third and final season, they were revealed to be illusions created by the Global Heroes due to them being trapped in a fantasy world Fantos made to keep them out of his way.
- Erodius the Planet Killer, a mysterious, sentient rogue planet that generates a powerful gravity well to destroy other planets and absorb them into its body as it travels in a single direction throughout the cosmos. At the end of the series, Erodius is revealed to have been a benevolent planet who used its power to heal the injured and sick until it was injured by an asteroid. It had only been destroying planets because it was searching for its last remaining fragment. After learning this, Papa G sacrifices his Stone to Erodius to heal it.

=== Minor ===
- Lauren Tom as Mo, Flo's mother and Jo's grandmother who was the founder of Mo's Oasis Cafe. She died before the events of the series.
- Laura Bailey and Travis Willingham as Kid's deceased parents who were killed in a car collision by a semi-truck before the events of the series. Their deaths were so horrible that Kid was traumatized after that incident and said the lethal accident was what caused Kid to dream of being a superhero. Additionally, Kid has developed PTSD and has occasionally shown signs of it in the series. They, like their son, liked superheroes and Kid's mother made the cape that Kid always wears, even today. They appeared in the third season as the final illusion Kid has to confront, realizing, with the help of Papa G that they were trapped in an illusion world created by Fantos and Kid's imagination.
- Fantos' mother, an elderly alien woman who is the mother of Fantos who he lives with and goes to for emotional support. In the second-season finale "The World is Saved", she dumps his belongings and leaves her son on Erodius. In episode five of the third season titled "The Planet Killer", she is shown in a fantasy world, regretting her decision.
- Rich Fulcher as Zarkon, a small green alien and an adversary of Kid and his friends. Despite being easily able to defeat the Local Heroes and take the stones, he ends up getting electrocuted to death when he flies into a power line.
- Jennifer Hale as I.R.I.S (Integrated Robot Intelligence System), a female robot who controls everything in the PPG headquarters. In the episode "The Global Conspiracy", she became a robot, later Jo mentioned Carl staked I.R.I.S's "vampire" robot heart.
- Ike Amadi as Crispin Clearly, chief officer of the B.C.E.I.T.A.A (Bureau of Cosmic Events, Intergalactic Threats and Alien Affairs). He appeared in the series finale episode "The Grand Opening of Planet Earth" because he was sent by the I.C.P.P.P.P.E (International Council of Protection and Propagation on Planet Earth) to thank the Local Heroes for saving Earth from Erodius. But he forbids them from telling the world about their superhero adventures.
- Jack McBrayer as Skippy Olsen, an agent who works with the PPG.

== Episodes ==
=== Series overview ===
Season	Episodes	Subtitle	Originally released
1	10	The Local Heroes!	February 2, 2021
2	8	The Intergalactic Truckstop!	September 7, 2021
3	6	The Global Heroes!	February 3, 2022

=== Season 1: The Local Heroes! (2021) ===
Each episode was directed by Craig McCracken, but various others co-direct with him.

No. overall	No. in season	Title	Co-director(s)	Written by	Storyboard by	Original release date
1	1	"Kid Cosmic and the Rings of Power!"	Dave Thomas	Teleplay by : Francisco Angones, Craig McCracken, & Kevin Seccia; Story by : Francisco Angones, Craig McCracken, Dave Thomas & Justin Nichols	Craig McCracken, Justin Nichols & Dave Thomas	February 2, 2021
In the depths of space, a fleet of orange aliens attack a spacecraft carrying five Stones of Power. Badly damaged, the spacecraft's pilot uses the purple Stone's power to evade all but one of the pursuing aliens and crash-lands in an unspecified area of the American desert. The wreckage is discovered by superhero fanatic Kid, who recovers the Stones and makes them into rings, dubbing himself "Kid Cosmic". He takes the green Stone for himself, which gives him the power of flight. He shows off his power to his friend Jo, a teenager working at her mother's diner in town. Jo takes the purple Stone, granting the power to create portals. The two are ambushed by the orange alien from the fleet (later nicknamed "Stuck Chuck" by Jo) but manage to trap him in the floor of Kid's trailer. Chuck tells Jo and Kid that the Stones' presence on Earth will ignite a cosmic war that will destroy the planet, so Kid convinces Jo to help him form a superhero team to protect the town.
2	2	"Kid Cosmic y la Niña Gigantica"	Rob Renzetti	Teleplay by : Craig McCracken, Amy Higgins & Rob Renzetti; Story by : Amy Higgins, Craig McCracken, Justin Nichols, Rob Renzetti, Kevin Seccia & Paul Watling	Vaughn Tada	February 2, 2021
Kid's blue Stone is stolen by 4-year-old Rosa, granting her the power to grow to 40 feet tall. Jo and Kid unsuccessfully try to remove the ring from Rosa's finger, with Kid vehemently opposed to Rosa joining his superhero team. Giant Rosa accidentally frees Chuck from the trailer and he uses the power of the yellow Ring to create copies of himself and take back the green and purple Stones. Chuck attempts to leave Earth, but Rosa destroys his spaceship and takes the rings back. Kid recognizes Rosa's abilities and accepts her as a member of the team. He gives the yellow ring to his grandfather, Papa G, and hides the red Stone on the collar of Tuna Sandwich, granting the cat precognitive abilities.
3	3	"Kid Cosmic and the Precognitive Cat"	Rob Renzetti	Written by : Ben Joseph & Craig McCracken; Story by : Ben Joseph, Craig McCracken, Justin Nichols, Rob Renzetti, Kevin Seccia & Paul Watling	Justin Nichols	February 2, 2021
After a few less-than-successful attempts at superhero training, Chuck convinces Kid to look for the Sacred Scroll of the Stones, which he claims will teach them how to control their powers. Kid takes Chuck, Rosa, and Papa G to find the spaceship's wreckage, while Jo reluctantly tags along. Tuna Sandwich has a vision that appears to show Kid on the ship as it explodes, and follows after them. After finding the spaceship, Chuck admits to lying about the Scroll and attempts to contact his Great Leader through the ship's console, but is attacked by Tuna. In the ensuing chaos, the ship's self-destruct sequence is activated. Everyone manages to escape the explosion through one of Jo's portals, though Chuck loses the lower half of his body in the process. Kid christens his team with the name "Kid Cosmic and the Local Heroes," as one of Tuna's future premonitions shows a giant alien battle raging across the desert with Kid in it.
4	4	"Kid Cosmic and the Local Heroes"	Rob Renzetti & Paul Watling	Written by : Craig McCracken & Kevin Seccia; Story by : Craig McCracken, Justin Nichols, Rob Renzetti, Kevin Seccia & Paul Watling	Paul Watling	February 2, 2021
Waves of invading aliens start arriving on Earth to claim the Stones. The Local Heroes manage to hold onto the rings mainly through a combination of luck and Rosa's brute force, documenting their victories on tape. Kid starts a tradition of awarding the "Medal of Heroism" to the team member who saved the day, but starts to doubt himself when he becomes the only hero yet to receive one. Desperate to prove himself, Kid takes on and defeats an invading robot army alone, not knowing that it was actually Papa G trying to boost his confidence. The team gives Kid his medal, but unbeknownst to everyone, Chuck steals the tape containing proof of Papa G's ruse.
5	5	"Kid Cosmic and the Big Win"	Rob Renzetti	Written by : Craig McCracken & Tim McKeon; Story by : Craig McCracken, Tim McKeon, Justin Nichols, Rob Renzetti, Kevin Seccia & Paul Watling	Justin Nichols, Vaughn Tada & Paul Watling	February 2, 2021
"Demon Death Dogs" attack Mo's Diner, forcing The Local Heroes to reveal their powers to everyone inside, including Rosa's parents and Jo's mom, Flo. Still on a high after defeating Papa G's "robot army", Kid tries and continually fails to subdue the invaders. Papa G discovers that the dogs can be defeated by disabling their collars, and the team quickly defeats them with Flo's help. The diner patrons learn to appreciate the team's powers and toast The Local Heroes, but Kid leaves the celebration early after being referred to as the team's comic relief. Distraught, he returns to his trailer, where Chuck plays Kid the tape revealing the truth of his "victory" over the robots.
6	6	"Kid Cosmic and the Epic Fail"	Rob Renzetti	Written by : Todd Casey & Craig McCracken; Story by : Craig McCracken, Todd Casey, Justin Nichols, Rob Renzetti & Kevin Seccia	Bianca Siercke, Justin Nichols	February 2, 2021
Using the footage of the faked robot invasion and a news clipping of his parents' fatal car accident, Chuck goads Kid into helping him contact his Great Leader. Aiming to defeat the Great Leader himself, Kid steals the Stones from the other Local Heroes and destroys three waves of arriving aliens. He tries to attack the Great Leader's ship with all 5 Stones at once, but the power overwhelms him and he collapses. The Great Leader collects the rings but quickly hands them over to an approaching pack of Demon Dogs and retreats, leaving Earth and Chuck behind. The dogs hand the Stones to a mysterious biker, a regular at Mo's Diner. The Biker in Black reveals himself to be an undercover government agent as soldiers and helicopters swarm into the town. Jo tries to defend Kid, but he sadly tells her it's over.
7	7	"Kid Cosmic and the Invaders from Earth"	Rob Renzetti	Written by : Rob Renzetti; Story by : Craig McCracken, Rob Renzetti & Kevin Seccia	Vaughn Tada	February 2, 2021
A few days after the attack, the military moved into town under the orders of the Biker in Black. Jo, Rosa, and Papa G are kept under strict surveillance, while Kid has gone missing. After being captured by the Biker, Tuna Sandwich helps Chuck subdue a vengeful alien delivery driver, the owner of the wrecked spacecraft that brought the Stones to Earth. A now redeemed Chuck agrees to help find Kid and gives Tuna his chest translator. The two of them rescue Rosa from house arrest, sneak Jo out of the diner, and meet at Papa G's house. While hiding in Kid's trailer, they overhear The Biker in Black telling Papa G that the team were guinea pigs to test the Stones' power, and uses the Stones to create superpowered mech suits. After he leaves, Tuna Sandwich warns the team of a massive alien invasion on its way to Earth, and the Local Heroes conspire to take back the Stones, as 5 agents, recruited by the Biker and dubbed 'the Force', arrive in town.
8	8	"Earth Force Enforcement Force"	Rob Renzetti & Paul Watling	Written by : Kevin Seccia & Craig McCracken; Story by : Craig McCracken, Rob Renzetti, Kevin Seccia & Paul Watling	Paul Watling	February 2, 2021
Using the Stone-powered mech suits, the Biker in Black assembles a team of wisecracking heroes dubbed the Earth Force Enforcement Force to fight the alien invasion. The battle descends into chaos as opposing alien forces fight both the Earth Force and each other for the Stones. Watching dejected from a mountaintop, Kid notices that the arriving aliens have the same powers as the Stones. He realizes the aliens are trying to reclaim the Stones stolen from their home planet, not steal them, and rides his bike directly into the battlefield to tell the Earth Force to stop fighting, as the local heroes, watching from afar, resolve to rescue Kid.
9	9	"Kid Cosmic and the Bad Good Guys"	Benjamin Balisteri, Rob Renzetti & Dave Thomas	Written by : Craig McCracken, Rob Renzetti; Story by : Alex Hirsch, Craig McCracken, Rob Renzetti, Kevin Seccia & Paul Watling	Benjamin Balisteri	February 2, 2021
Kid launches himself straight into danger, trying to get the attention of the Earth Force to tell them the aliens aren't evil. He fails to get through and is picked up by the rest of the Local Heroes. The team makes up and agrees to help return the Stones to their rightful owners. The Local Heroes and Chuck repurpose an ice cream truck as the "Kid Cosmobile," and Papa G supplies them with superhero costumes. Driving directly into the battle, the gang repeatedly interrupts the fighting to convince the Earth Force to stand down. Papa G reprograms a Demon Dog to help the Local Heroes sneak into the Biker in Black's bunker. Kid tells the Biker his plan to help the aliens, but learns that the Biker intends to capture them and use the Stones to make Earth the galaxy's number one superpower, with the Biker and the government taking the Local Heroes in custody.
10	10	"Kid Cosmic and the Day is Saved"	Benjamin Balisteri, Rob Renzetti & Dave Thomas	Written by : Craig McCracken, Rob Renzetti; Story by : Alex Hirsch, Craig McCracken, Rob Renzetti, Kevin Seccia & Paul Watling	Benjamin Balisteri, Justin Nichols, Vaughn Tada & Dave Thomas	February 2, 2021
The aliens are captured by Earth Force as the Local Heroes are escorted away by armed soldiers. Chuck subdues his captor and uses their weapon to reclaim the green Stone. Kid reassembles his ring, the Earth Force unable to capture him with his unpredictable flying. While the rest of the Local Heroes escape in the Kid Cosmobile and rescue the aliens. The Biker tries to run down the heroes with his truck, triggering Kid's memory of his parents' accident. In his moment of distress, Kid levitates everyone off the ground, revealing the green Stone's true power of telekinesis. He uses the power to take the rest of the Stones back from the Earth Force and offer them back to the aliens, learning the Stones are the remaining remnants of their worlds, destroyed by the Planet Killer, Erodius. 6 months later, life for the team has mostly returned to normal when a battered Queen Xhan comes back to town with the 5 Stones, announcing that Erodius has returned, and they need to collect all 13 Stones to defeat Erodius. She creates a portal that envelopes the diner and transports everyone inside into outer space.

=== Season 2: The Intergalactic Truckstop! (2021) ===
Justin Nichols and Dave Thomas direct every episode, aside from "Kid Cosmic and the Pyramid Puzzle of Pain", which was solely directed by Thomas.

No. overall	No. in season	Title	Written by	Storyboard by	Original release date
11	1	"Kid Cosmic and the Other Stones of Power"	Lauren Faust, Craig McCracken, Rob Renzetti & Kevin Seccia	Justin Nichols, Vaughn Tada & Paul Watling	September 7, 2021
Some time has passed since the events of the first season, and Mo's Oasis is having big success serving intergalactic patrons. However, Kid is impatient to begin searching for the remaining stones and crosses paths with Fantos the Amassor, an evil fanboy of Erodius the Planet Killer, who wants to find the 13 stones himself to help Erodius destroy the galaxy. He makes Kid call the rest of the team to save him, and Kid, thirsty for adventures, relents. Then Fantos reveals that he already has some of the stones, which allows him to take the rest of the stones from the team. However, Rosa decides to attack him and allow the rest of the team to recover some of the stones except for Kid's telekinetic stone, while Kid obtains a stone that allows him to transform himself into a goo-like state, and another stone that allows the user to have multiple arms to Flo, temporarily. While Kid is determined to retrieve his stone, Jo is dubious about her leading role and begins to look for counsel in Queen Xhan.
12	2	"Kid Cosmic and the Pyramid Puzzle of Pain"	Written by : Lauren Faust, Craig McCracken, Rob Renzetti, Susanna Wolff; Story by : Lauren Faust, Craig McCracken, Colleen Evanson, Rob Renzetti & Susanna Wolff	Dave Thomas	September 7, 2021
The Local Heroes confront the challenge of the Pyramid Puzzle of Pain, where Jo is determined to put her leadership skills she learned from Queen Xhan to the test. However, her inability to hear Flo's counsel makes her use the powers of the other stones to cheat on the puzzles, provoking Jo and the team to fail in a mortal trap when Jo removes the Speed Stone. However, when Jo realizes the magnitude of the error, she decides to use the Speed Stone to deduce the solutions to the puzzles and obtain the remaining prize stones that help her release her friends. However, she does not accept that her mother's counsel influenced her to save the day, much to Flo's chagrin.
13	3	"Kid Cosmic and the Heist of Ice and Fire"	Written by : Lauren Faust, Han-Yee Ling, Craig McCracken, Rob Renzetti; Story by : Colleen Evanson, Lauren Faust, Han-Yee Ling, Craig McCracken & Rob Renzetti	Justin Nichols, Brandon Warren	September 7, 2021
The Local Heroes infiltrate a birthday party for Boss Fiosa, a deadly syndicate leader who has the Ice and Fire stones that she got from killing her husband. The heist becomes successful, and Jo wants to celebrate, but Flo and the rest of the team think they need to go home. However, Queen Xhan reminds Jo who is the leader, and she puts the team back into the party, without noticing that Fantos has also arrived at the party to steal the stones. When Kid notices Fantos' presence, he decides to try to steal back his telekinetic stone without hearing Jo's orders, blowing the team's cover. However, Erodius also appears and begins to destroy the planet that is giving gravity to the satellite where the party is thrown, making Jo panic. Flo takes the lead and makes the Local Heroes help the invites to evacuate. Fantos, excited by Erodius' presence, is distracted enough by Jo's panic to get the stones stolen back by Queen Xhan. In the end, Flo feels frustrated about not helping her daughter to improve her leadership abilities, and while Jo and Kid accept their mutual errors, she is still unsure about her bravery. Later, Jo watches an intergalactic wrestling show that gives her an idea.
14	4	"Kid Cosmic and the Galactic Champion"	Written by : Colleen Evanson, Lauren Faust, Craig McCracken & Rob Renzetti; Story by : Colleen Evanson, Lauren Faust, Craig McCracken & Rob Renzetti	Erin Kavanagh, Chris Palmer & Vaughn Tada	September 7, 2021
Jo joins The Fight Hole, an intergalactic wrestling show, to the horror of Flo, who sends the Local Heroes (along with newly added members Carla, Carlos, and Ramona) to stop Jo from fighting. However, most of the challengers are defeated by either Jo or Rosa, and Rosa herself is defeated by Jo. In the end, Jo challenges Krosh, the universal champion, and realizes she has the Pain Absorption Stone of Power that allows her to endure the pain. Jo removes the gem from her and can push her out of the arena, winning the tournament. However, Jo decides to keep Krosh as the champion while acknowledging that she only wanted to conquer her fears and shouts out to Queen Xhan as her best influence, making Flo feel disappointed and realizing that Jo is completely distanced from her.
15	5	"Kid Cosmic and the Feeble Fighters"	Written by : Todd Casey, Craig McCracken, Rob Renzetti; Story by : Todd Casey, Colleen Evanson, Lauren Faust, Craig McCracken & Rob Renzetti	Erin Kavanagh, Vaughn Tada	September 7, 2021
With the help of Krosh, Jo tries to put the Local Heroes in shape to fight Erodius, but the team is not willing to fight against either Krosh or Rosa. At the same time, a group of survivors from a recent attack of Erodius migrates to Mo's Oasis with a size so tiny that the entire civilization could survive in one of the motel rooms. However, a surprise attack by Fantos puts the team at an advantage by removing the rings from the Local Heroes except for Krosh, Rosa, and Jo. Jo, thinking fast, puts the Local Heroes to work by protecting the immigrants while Krosh and Jo fight Fantos together and while Fantos takes the upper hand to the point of throwing Jo away from Mo's Oasis, Krosh rescues her, and they both defeat Fantos to the point of him running in humiliation. The gang celebrates the duo's triumph, but Jo announces that the Local Heroes are disbanded, deciding Krosh is the only team she needs to beat Erodius, much to the shock of the team, including Kid.
16	6	"Kid Cosmic and the Soul Kroshing Loss"	Written by : Craig McCracken, Colleen Evanson; Story by : Colleen Evanson, Lauren Faust, Craig McCracken & Rob Renzetti	John Jackson, Diana Kidlaied & Brandon Warren	September 7, 2021
Jo decides to make a team with Krosh as she finds the warrior fitting to use all the power stones and discards the Local Heroes. Kid asks Jo for a reason but his insistence makes Jo insult him, as Jo departs, Flo angrily blames Xhan for her terrible influence on Jo. Meanwhile, after arriving in Erodius surface, Erodius almost beat Jo, Krosh, and her two duplicates but Jo plans a strategy that allows the four to gain the upper hand. However, Krosh reveals her real intentions to use the stones to reclaim her throne in The Fight Hole, double-crossing Jo. However, Fantos vaporizes her and her duplicates and reclaims all the power stones. Jo then calls Kid, hot off the seven stages of grief earlier, for help before Fantos takes her captive, and gloats to Kid that he won, shocking him.
17	7	"Kid Cosmic and the Fallen Hero"	Written by : Craig McCracken, Rob Renzetti; Story by : Colleen Evanson, Lauren Faust, Craig McCracken & Rob Renzetti	Justin Nichols, Vaughn Tada, Dave Thomas & Brandon Warren	September 7, 2021
Fantos finally gets all 13 stones of power by removing Jo's Teleportation stone and uses them to move Erodius. After Kid tells the team what happened, Erodius and Fantos arrive directly at Mo's Oasis and send Jo away from the battle. Jo ends up stranded on a desert planet, where she finally realizes the errors that she made following Xhan's mentorship and is finally helped by Carlax, one of the alien regulars at the diner. When he learns Mo's Oasis is in danger, he calls all her intergalactic clients together to make a last stand against Erodius. While the coordinated attack is hitting hard on the planet, a frustrated Fantos decides to sucker punch Flo and Xhan inside, damaging the diner in process, shocking the team and to Jo's dismay.
18	8	"Kid Cosmic and the World is Saved"	Written by : Craig McCracken, Rob Renzetti; Story by : Colleen Evanson, Lauren Faust, Craig McCracken & Rob Renzetti	Justin Nichols, Vaughn Tada, Dave Thomas	September 7, 2021
Queen Xhan and Flo survived the surprise attack from Fantos, who decides to charge against Mo's Oasis, but while Jo and Carlax try their best to stop Fantos, she is easily defeated. Xhan uses her teleportation powers to remove the stones from Fantos and gives them to the Local Heroes, joining Jo on the ship. Fantos tries to remove the stones from them, but is expelled from the ship to Erodius' surface. With the powers at hand, the Local Heroes began to destroy Erodius and discover a lot of Power Stones buried on the surface. Kid discovers a telekinesis stone, but loses it against Fantos, who manages to remove all the stones from the Local Heroes and send them away while sending the others involved to other places in space. Erodius destroys Mo's Oasis, while Queen Xhan, who lost her tentacle arm while fighting Fantos, runs away with the small civilization. Finally, Erodius is moved once again to Earth, where the Local Heroes see the planet approaching in frustration. However, Kid brings a big Goo Stone with him, and, along with some Growth Stones, he comes up with a plan. The Local Heroes, using a Teleportation Stone, enter Erodius and using the properties of both Goo and Growth stones to burrow into the center of the planet and destroy it just before it collides with Earth. After that, 3 agents from the Planet Protection Group (PPG), a group banded to defend Earth, approach the Local Heroes to thank them for their actions but also to enlist them to find the stones that are now all over the planet, reforming the group now as The Global Heroes.

=== Season 3: The Global Heroes! (2022) ===
Like most of the previous season, Justin Nichols and Dave Thomas directed every episode.

No. overall	No. in season	Title	Written by	Storyboard by	Original release date
19	1	"Kid Cosmic and the Best Day Ever"	Written by : Craig McCracken, Ryan Faust; Story by : Ryan Faust, Craig McCracken, Rob Renzetti & Francisco Angones	Erin Kavanaugh, Vaughn Tada & John Jackson	February 3, 2022
Sometime after the events of the second season, Kid and the rest of the gang have joined an organization that provides the team with a new vehicle, uniforms. and a new mission: to stop all evil enemies that would be misusing the Cosmic Stones. They confront first a dog that swallowed an invisibility stone and causes mayhem in a carnival. After catching the dog and helping him release the stone, they are confronted by another enemy that uses the Growth stone to become gigantic, but the combined efforts of the Global Heroes and the use of Chuck's pain-absorbing Stone earn another victory. The people claim the Global Heroes are heroes, but Papa G becomes suspicious of the way the missions were solved so easily. Meanwhile, The Biker in Black builds a giant robot, searching for vengeance against Kid for his defeat.
20	2	"Kid Cosmic and the Secret of the Fourteenth Stone"	Written by : Francisco Angones, Craig McCracken; Story by : Francisco Angones, Colleen Evanson, Craig McCracken & Rob Renzetti	Brandon Warren, Diana Kidlaied & Natalie Wetzig	February 3, 2022
While trying to remember how the Global Heroes were capable of beating a big slime monster, Jo realizes that something is not right in the way the missions are happening. The team learns that there is an unknown fourteenth Cosmic Stone and try to search for it, first by defeating a telekinetic Egyptian supervillain, then a hideous potato kid in Idaho that uses three stones and finally going to an underwater kingdom where its king reveals that he only wants to marry Jo. But, when the Global Heroes try to catch up with the situation, they are called back to use a big mecha robot to confront The Biker in Black's machine. Jo, still suspicious, moves out of the machine during the fight and she finds evidence that the reality has been altered and that the missions are fixed by none other than Kid Cosmic unknowingly, who is inadvertently materializing his adventures based on the comics he read that he would win easily, but Papa G appears, revealing he was aware of it since they were sent to Earth and had known because the comics that Kid reads were originally his and was able to deduce it since the comics and missions they previously undertook were extremely similar to the comic's stories. Jo runs to warn Kid, but Papa G fights her in his desire to keep Kid happy. When Jo defeats him, Papa G falls into the vacuum, revealing he is not a clone and urging Jo to save him. Soon, Jo asks Papa G to tell the truth to Kid or risk breaking his heart for his secrecy. Meanwhile, Kid and the gang defeat the Biker in Black and a rock band featuring Kid's favorite; Dr. Fang and the Gang, celebrates their triumph, still unaware none of it was real, while Jo tries to figure how to get out of the fake world, Papa G looks on, wondering if he should keep up the charade or tell Kid the truth.
21	3	"Kid Cosmic and the Global Conspiracy"	Written by : Rob Renzetti, Craig McCracken; Story by : Francisco Angones, Colleen Evanson, Craig McCracken & Rob Renzetti	Gustavo Cosío Herrera, Vaughn Tada & Remi Godin	February 3, 2022
After the celebration concert, Kid begins to suspect that the PPG is retrieving the Cosmic Stones to use for evil and reveals his suspicions to Papa G, who is still undecided to reveal the truth to his grandson. Meanwhile, Jo puts the rest of the gang together to reveal that they are living in a fantasy world after Fantos sent them away from Erodius using the teleportation portal stone, and as long as the fantasy lives in Kid's head they need to find out a way out by reading his comics, but were unfortunately unsuccessful. Kid and Papa G pass through a group of fake booby traps, the AI of the building, and even the three PPG Agents to reveal the biggest secret of the place: Kid's parents are working secretly for the PPG. Before the situation can escalate, Papa G, shocked that his fake parents told Kid they faked their death's to prove himself worthy, reveals to Kid that everything that happens in this world is just his fantasies. Kid realizes that Papa G is telling the truth, and desires to move out of the fantasy world. Kid's fake parents and the fantasy world vanish, but the gang is left in the vacuum of space.
22	4	"Kid Cosmic and the Little Spark"	Written by : Rob Renzetti, Colleen Evanson, Craig McCracken; Story by : Francisco Angones, Colleen Evanson, Craig McCracken & Rob Renzetti	John Jackson, Erin Kavanaugh	February 3, 2022
Queen Xhan manages to find and save the gang, who had become completely demoralized when they learn that Fantos has defeated them and that they no longer have the Stones. Everyone decides to resign to leave a peaceful life on the refugee planet except for Rosa, who just recently woke up after being in a coma for a few days, as well as Ensign Mainstay and two young cadets, Vinia and Brake, from the tiny civilization that decides to follow her. Rosa comes along with the rest of the gang, even crossing with Flo and Papa G, who reveals to Flo that it requires a little spark to change anything, telling the story of how he found a small crystal when he was a kid and how it became his lucky amulet. Rosa finally finds Jo and Kid, who discuss the way to cheat Fantos and steal the Stones, but when Jo finds flaws in the plan, Kid loses hope and decides to leave the quest. Rosa does not agree, wanting to move forward, then she gets into a conversation using Kid's headphones with the tiny cadets, and they come up with a plan. The next day, Rosa comes back from Erodius using the escape pod and two small ships, having stolen some of the Cosmic Stones from Fantos, who was unaware of it as he had fallen asleep, giving a big spark of hope for the team and the universe, while the cadets, despite their disobedience, are rewarded for their actions, making Ensign the new Commander.
23	5	"Kid Cosmic and the Planet Killer"	Written by : Craig McCracken, Francisco Angones, Rob Renzetti; Story by : Francisco Angones, Colleen Evanson, Craig McCracken & Rob Renzetti	Gustavo Cosío Herrera, Brandon Warren & Diana Kidlaied	February 3, 2022
Fantos, tired of seeing Erodius destroying small planets and asteroids, decides to use the Green Stone to lead Erodius on a collision course to Earth. The Local Heroes infiltrate Erodius and confront Fantos, who easily dispatches the Heroes with the collection of Stones in his apron. During the battle, Papa G is seemingly crushed by some stones, and while Kid loses his green stone to help him, while also remembers his first days with Papa G when he helps him build a bike using stuff from the junkyard to comfort him over the loss of his parents. However, Papa G emerges completely unharmed and reveals that, somehow, his lucky amulet had saved his life. Fantos traps all the Local Heroes inside a big suit made with Erodius' geodes and uses the energy of the planet to start attacking Earth, but suddenly, Erodius manifests the Goo Stone's power and traps Fantos underneath a pool of slime, suffocating him. The gang try their best to save themselves, but Kid decides to dive into the slime pool to recover the Stones. When all seems lost, Kid emerges from the slime and reclaims the Stones, including his own, which he uses to momentarily slow down Erodius. Suddenly, Erodius uses the Red Stone's power to connect mentally with everyone and reveals that it was a planet used for healing but, after being destroyed by an asteroid, moved to destroy other planets so it can find the remains of its core that would restore it. Papa G realizes that he has the fourteenth stone--his lucky amulet, which has kept him alive for 112 years-- and uses it to cure Erodius. However, this causes the Power Stones to lose power. Jo uses the remains of her power to get the gang back to Earth, but without his stone, Papa G's age catches up to him and seemingly collapses.
24	6	"Kid Cosmic and the Grand Opening of Planet Earth"	Written by : Rob Renzetti, Craig McCracken; Story by : Francisco Angones, Colleen Evanson, Craig McCracken & Rob Renzetti	John Jackson, Dave Thomas, Justin Nichols & Vaughn Tada	February 3, 2022
Kid and the gang, along with a still-alive Papa G using a wheelchair, attend a funeral service to mourn the victims of Erodius from the planets their Power Stones originated, and discard the now powerless stones into the chasm where Mo's Oasis once was. A man in black and soldiers appear to thank them for saving Earth from Erodius and pay them big, but tell them to keep their adventures a secret. Six months later, the new Mo's Oasis is about to reopen. Kid plans to share the truth of all their adventures through comic books, but all the editors reject his ideas. Frustrated, he takes a bike ride and sees an agent of the PPG, and so thinks this means they are still in the fantasy world, but while the PPG is real, it is not the same as the fantasy version. Frustrated again, Kid ventilates he is not happy with not sharing the truth to the rest of the world: not that he and the gang are heroes, but that while the communities of the rest of the universe are so much like the ones on Earth, the planet is cut off from all of it, acknowledging that the diner is in the middle of nowhere. Later, he discovers that the gang, touched by his speech, has modified the jukebox to broadcast into outer space, enabling aliens to visit Earth and attend the diner, reuniting their alien friends, with Flo, making a speech to Kid, stating that his fantasies brought everyone together in the first place, as everyone celebrates. During the end credits, three government helicopters arrive, but are beamed up by an alien spaceship.

== Production ==
Upon completion of his Foster's Home for Imaginary Friends series in 2009, Craig McCracken planned a career in publishing his own comics or graphic novels, a more "intimate [and] direct approach to cartooning" in contrast to working with a large crew for a television network. During that time he made a comic strip entitled The Kid from Planet Earth, about a young boy who fantasized about becoming a superhero. He was inspired by the idea of how different reality would be if the character actually got the chance to fulfill such an aspiration. McCracken wanted to "tap into this naïve confidence that all kids have" of being a superhero, while also basing the concept on his early years of wanting to become a professional artist. He later realized that, in order to have the characters "learn, grow and change," he would have to tell the story with a serialized format. Knowing that "[no network] would want it at the time", he put the idea aside until 2015, when the industry of animation became more accepting of serialization within kids' animated series.

After the cancellation of Wander Over Yonder, McCracken, alongside his wife Lauren Faust, his friend Francisco Angones, as well as several former Wander Over Yonder staff members including Andy Bean, Chris Tsirgotis, Justin Nichols and Dave Thomas, further expanded the idea and ultimately produced an animatic for a 22-minute episode. The series was then pitched to Disney, who ultimately passed on it in favor of The Owl House. Upon learning that Netflix were setting up an animation studio and was looking for new shows, he went to their studios on a Thursday and presented the animatic as a pilot. The executives supported the idea of a 22-minute family show, and greenlit the series the following Wednesday. "It was really quick and quite an incredible experience!", McCracken recalled in 2021. The show was eventually retitled to Kid Cosmic to avoid confusion with The Last Kids on Earth, another Netflix cartoon.

McCracken and his old friend Rob Renzetti served as executive producers for the show. With the use of the Toon Boom Harmony software, Mercury Filmworks animated the show in Ottawa, Canada, with a staff of 110 employees. The company had done animation services previously for the first season of Wander Over Yonder, McCracken's previous creation. Netflix's animation division is leading production with a team of approximately 45 people. Having produced solely for television in the past, McCracken felt that he now had more creative freedom to pitch projects that had a darker tone or that could work as a movie, something that television channels "might shy away from". Due to the COVID-19 pandemic, the series team had to continue working at home since March 2020, slowing down the production process. According to McCracken, completing a season takes a year and a half of hard work, from writing start to finish.

=== Design and themes ===
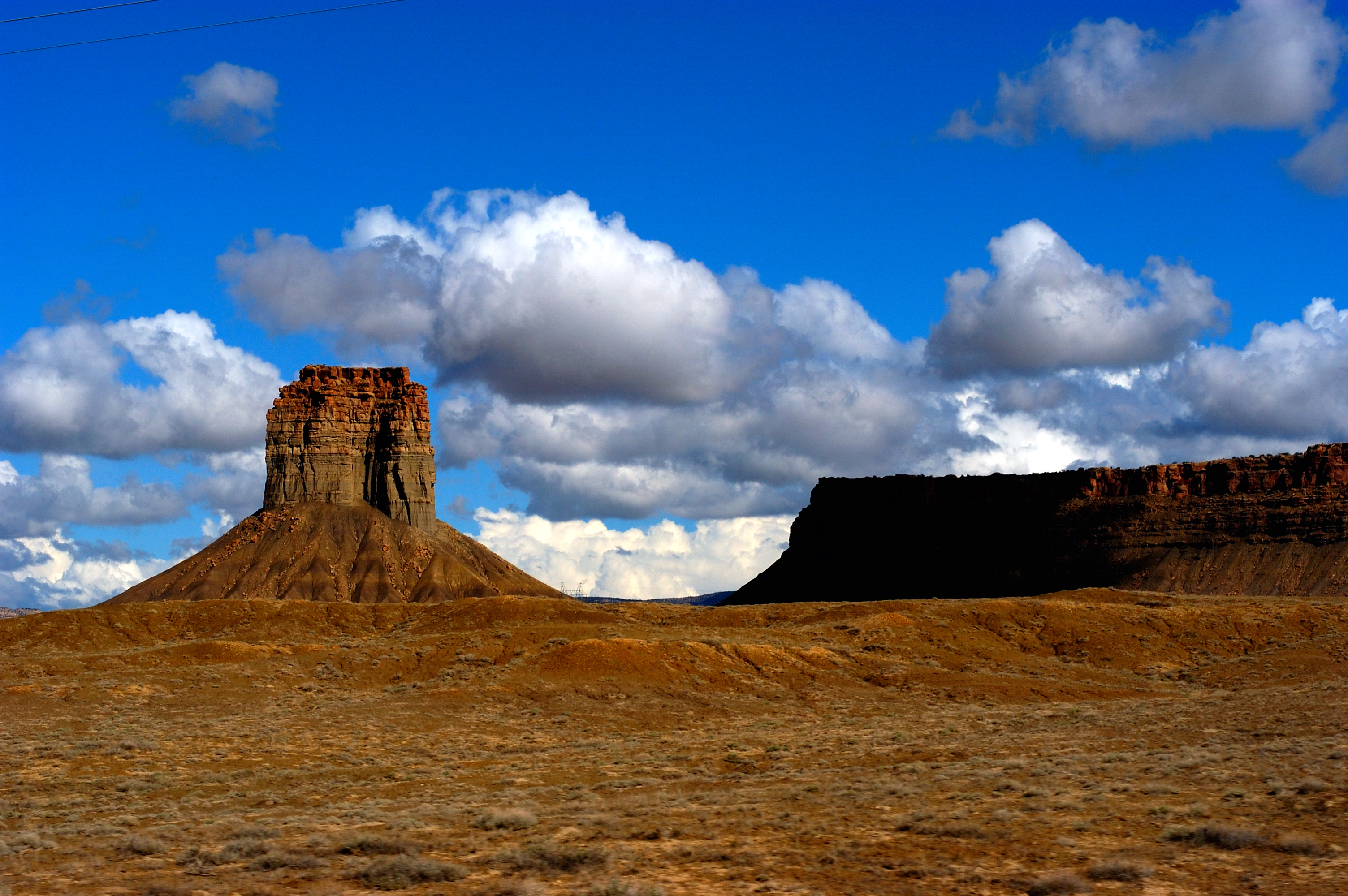
The New Mexico desert is presumed to be the series main setting.

The main setting of the show, an arid landscape with a "generic rural southwest desert vibe", is presumed to be New Mexico. However, McCracken said in an interview for Den of Geek: "It could be New Mexico, it could be California [or] it could be Arizona. Basically it's a remote enough place where a spaceship could crash and not a lot of people would know about it."

Stylistically, the show is meant to resemble the visual look of classic comics such as Hank Ketcham's Dennis the Menace and Hergé's The Adventures of Tintin, where every action is grounded in reality: "A lot of the choices that we made in Kid were based on the fact that these are real people in the real world [...] So with the animation we avoided overly smooth and flowy actions or lots of squash and stretch, things that you associate with cartoons," McCracken said. Stuck Chuck's design is a nod to the aliens from the 1996 film Mars Attacks! and other science-fiction movies. Spaceships, cars, and major locations like Mo's Oasis Café are often represented by 3D models.

McCracken affirmed that some of the ideas explored within the show are also based on things that he personally experienced, such as the loss of his father at the age of 7, similar to the protagonist, who lost both of his parents. The dynamics between Kid and Jo are loosely based on McCracken's relationship with his older sister and are similar to those of Mac and Frankie in Foster's Home for Imaginary Friends. Rosa's "playful spirit" is also a reflection of the creator's young daughter.

Kid Cosmic also plays on the theme that "heroes help, not hurt", which means the characters often show a compassionate attitude toward their adversaries. This strays in tone from McCracken's first popular work, The Powerpuff Girls, which he described as a "campy parody of superheroes". He declared: "I really didn't want to tell a story to kids that said, 'Hey, if you get great powers, then you can go and beat up bad guys and be violent and win.' I didn't want that to be the message. So I asked myself what a real hero is".

== Music ==
The series features music by composer and multi-instrumentalist Andy Bean, who had previously worked on soundtracks for animated productions. In February 2021, Netflix released a soundtrack album titled Kid Cosmic and the Sonic Courage. Under the name of the show's fictional "70's psychedelic garage punk band" Dr. Fang and the Gang, the soundtrack features music and songs of the first season written, composed and performed by multi-instrumentalist Andy Bean. He had previously written and composed the soundtrack for McCracken's third series Wander Over Yonder.

== Release ==
Kid Cosmic was announced on November 6, 2018, along with other Netflix animated projects. A trailer was released on January 5, and the show debuted on February 2, 2021. Five companion shorts were released on the Netflix Features YouTube channel on February 3, 2021. The trailer for season 2 was released on August 10 of that year, with the episodes debuting later on September 7. The trailer for season 3 was released on the Netflix website at January 6, 2022 and on the official Netflix Futures YouTube channel on January 13 of that year, with the last 6 episodes debuting later on February 3 of that year.

== Reception ==
Kid Cosmic was met with positive reviews. On Rotten Tomatoes, the first season holds a 100% approval rating based on 6 reviews, with an average rating of 7.9/10.

Adrián Carande from the Spanish magazine Cinemanía called it "a little miracle [that is] flawlessly animated" and brings McCracken back to his roots, while being "sincere" "fast-paced", and "effective". IGN's Nicole Clark said that the first season wrapped up with the side characters lacking development, instead focusing on Kid's emotional process as a superhero. She also described him as "an extremely challenging character to sit with", and synthesized this season as a "merely entertaining show." Karen Han from Slate magazine said that the season "is all about opening the gates and letting people in", with the main team "finally finding its groove" and a cliffhanger ending. Vulture editor John Maher included the show as one of the stand-out animations from early 2021, praising the "patient character development, subtle world-building flourishes, and a willingness to explore just how hard it is to grow up." Likewise, Los Angeles Times named Kid Cosmic one of the 13 best TV shows of that year. Amanda Dyer of Common Sense Media described the series as a "fun superhero comedy teaches patience" but warned of the "mild violence." She also stated that character in the series learn "valuable lessons about teamwork and what makes a true superhero" and said the series is a "great option for family viewing" especially for those who grew up watching The Powerpuff Girls.

=== Awards and nominations ===
Year	Award	Category	Nominee	Result	Ref.
2022	Annie Awards	Best Character Design - TV/Media	Craig McCracken (for "Kid Cosmic and the Rings of Power!")	Nominated	
2022	Annie Awards	Best Storyboarding - TV/Media	Justin Nichols (for "Kid Cosmic and the Big Win")	Nominated	
2022	Children's & Family Emmy Awards	Individual Achievement in Animation	Chris Tsirgiotis (background designer)	Won	
2022	Children's & Family Emmy Awards	Individual Achievement in Animation	Craig McCracken (character designer)	Won	
2023	Kidscreen Awards	Best Animated Series	Kid Cosmic	Nominated	
