= My Life as a Teenage Robot =

American animated television series

- Also known as: Teenage Robot; MLaaTR
- Genre: Comedy; Action-adventure; Comic science fiction Superhero; Animated sitcom
- Created by: Rob Renzetti
- Developed by: Rob Renzetti; Alex Kirwan; Joseph Holt; Jill Friemark; Dan Krall
- Voices of: Janice Kawaye; Candi Milo; Chad Doreck; Audrey Wasilewski; Quinton Flynn
- Theme music composer: Peter Lurye
- Composers: James L. Venable; Paul Dinletir
- Country of origin: United States
- Original language: English
- No. of seasons: 3
- No. of episodes: 40 (76 segments) (list of episodes)

Production
- Executive producers: Rob Renzetti; Fred Seibert
- Running time: 23 minutes
- Production companies: Frederator Incorporated; Nickelodeon Animation Studios

Original release
- Network: Nickelodeon
- Release: August 1, 2003 – September 9, 2005
- Network: Nicktoons
- Release: October 4, 2008 – May 2, 2009

Related
- Oh Yeah! Cartoons

My Life as a Teenage Robot is an American animated science fiction superhero comedy television series created by Rob Renzetti for Nickelodeon. It was produced by Nickelodeon Animation Studios in association with Frederator Incorporated. Set in the fictional town of Tremorton, the series follows the adventures of a robot superheroine named XJ-9 (or "Jenny Wakeman", as she prefers to be called), who attempts to juggle her duties of protecting Earth while trying to live a normal human life as a teenage girl.

Renzetti pitched the series to Frederator Studios' animated shorts showcase Oh Yeah! Cartoons and a pilot titled "My Neighbor Was a Teenage Robot", which aired on December 4, 1999. The short was commissioned to a half-hour series, which premiered on August 1, 2003; after airing its first two seasons, the series was on a 3-year hiatus starting on October 17, 2005 when Nickelodeon cancelled it because of low ratings. The completed third season eventually aired on Nickelodeon's spinoff network Nicktoons from October 4, 2008, until ending its run on May 2, 2009. The series totals up to 40 episodes across three seasons, consisting of 13 to 14 episodes each.

== Overview ==
My Life as a Teenage Robot is set in the fictional town of Tremorton and focuses on making lighthearted fun of typical teenage issues and conventions of works relating to teenagers and superheroes. The series follows XJ-9, also known as "Jenny Wakeman" (Janice Kawaye) as she prefers to be called, who is a highly sophisticated state-of-the-art sentient robot girl created by her mother Dr. Nora Wakeman (Candi Milo), an elderly robotics scientist, five years before the series. Jenny is Earth's protector, armed with a wide range of weapons and devices, but simply wants to live the life of a normal teenager. She was preceded in development by eight other models; the season 1 episode "Sibling Tsunami" introduced XJs 1–8.

Jenny's friends are her neighbors Brad (Chad Doreck) and Tuck Carbuckle (Audrey Wasilewski). Brad is outgoing and adventurous, and is the first human friend Jenny makes, while Tuck is Brad's rambunctious younger brother who usually tags along on adventures. Another one of her friends is Sheldon Lee (Quinton Flynn), a somewhat stereotypical nerd who is obsessed with her; Jenny often rejects his romantic advances, but still cares for him as a friend. Being highly skilled in science and inventing, Sheldon has created gadgets and modifications for Jenny, usually very unnecessarily bulky and extravagant, as well as done minor repair work. He also occasionally masquerades as a robot superhero, the "Silver Shell". At Tremorton High School, however, Jenny has a tense, love-hate relationship with Britney "Brit" (Moira Quirk) and Tiffany "Tiff" Crust (Cree Summer), two cousins who are the school's resident popular girls obsessed with fashion and beauty.

Dr. Wakeman often tries in vain to control her creation and keep her daughter focused on protecting the planet Earth. Adding to her trouble is Jenny constantly being dogged by the all-robotic Cluster Empire, whose queen, Vexus (Eartha Kitt), and sometimes Commander Smytus (Steve Blum) or Krackus (Jim Ward), wants her to join their world of robots by force if necessary. Despite it all, Jenny struggles to maintain some semblance of a mostly human life.

The season 2 finale special of the series, "Escape from Cluster Prime", shows that the alien planet is actually a peaceful paradise for every kind of robot. It is also revealed that Vexus has made Jenny out to be a villain because of her constant refusals to join, branding her responsible for destroying the missing components that allow robots to transform. In actuality, they are truly hidden by Vexus so she can control the population.

== Episodes ==
Season	Segments	Episodes	Originally released		
Season	Segments	Episodes	First released	Last released	Network
Pilot			December 4, 1999		Nickelodeon
1	26	13	August 1, 2003	February 27, 2004	Nickelodeon
2	24	14	December 8, 2004	September 9, 2005	Nickelodeon
3	26	13	October 4, 2008 (Note: The third and final season originally aired in Asia from January 13, 2006 to March 30, 2007, and later in the United States on Nicktoons from October 4, 2008 to May 2, 2009.)	May 2, 2009	Nicktoons (U.S.)

== Production ==
Rob Renzetti moved from Cartoon Network to Nickelodeon to develop his own ideas as part of Fred Seibert's and Frederator Studios' Oh Yeah! Cartoons. At Nickelodeon, he developed a pilot called "My Neighbor Was a Teenage Robot", which was the basis for the series. After brief stints working on Family Guy, The Powerpuff Girls, Time Squad, Whatever Happened to... Robot Jones?, and Samurai Jack, Renzetti returned to Nickelodeon to start the Teenage Robot series.

Renzetti made 11 shorts during two seasons as a director on Oh Yeah! Cartoons. Five of these starred two characters called Mina and the Count and followed the adventures of a rambunctious little girl and her vampire best friend. He hoped that these characters might get their own series, but Nickelodeon rejected the idea. Faced with an empty slot where the sixth Mina short was slated to go, Fred Seibert tasked Renzetti to come up with three new ideas. One of these was about a teenage girl whose boyfriend was a robot. After further thought, Renzetti merged the two characters to create Jenny, a robot with the personality of a teenage girl.

In March 2002, Nickelodeon ordered 13 episodes of the series. The series was initially called "My Neighbor Was a Teenage Robot" before settling on its final title.

== Cancellation ==
The show's crew revealed on their blog on October 17, 2005, that the show had been cancelled, and that the third season would be the last: "The executives love the show but the ratings aren't good enough for them to give us more episodes." The series wrapped production in April 2006. Following the series' cancellation, Renzetti returned to Cartoon Network Studios, working on Foster's Home for Imaginary Friends and The Cartoonstitute, before moving on to the Disney Channel to become supervising producer for Gravity Falls. The third season aired on Nicktoons from October 2008 to May 2009, officially concluding the broadcast of the series in the United States.

== Broadcast and home media ==
Nickelodeon premiered My Life as a Teenage Robot on August 1, 2003, at 8:30 PM EST. The first season ended on February 27, 2004, with "The Wonderful World of Wizzly / Call Hating".

The second season premiered on December 8, 2004, with the Christmas episode "A Robot for All Seasons". Another new episode did not air until January 24, 2005. In the second season, a 48-minute, two-part TV movie titled "Escape from Cluster Prime" (which was nominated for an Emmy in 2006) aired.

From March 2021 to January 2022, reruns of the series aired on TeenNick during its NickRewind block.

In 2021, the entire series was available for streaming on Paramount+. The series was removed from the streaming service on December 19, 2024.

The episodes "See No Evil", "The Great Unwashed", "Future Shock", "A Robot for All Seasons", "Hostile Makeover", and "Grid Iron Glory" were included on Nick Picks DVD compilations released between 2005-2007. On December 12, 2011, seasons 1, 2, and 3 were released on DVD exclusively through Amazon.com's CreateSpace service in region 1. The full series was released across six discs by Beyond Home Entertainment in Australia on February 5, 2012.

My Life as a Teenage Robot home media releases
Season	Title	Release date	
Season	Title	Region 1	Region 4
1	Nick Picks #1	May 24, 2005	
1	Nick Picks #2	October 18, 2005	
1	Nick Picks #3	February 7, 2006	
1	Nick Picks #4	June 6, 2006	
1	Nick Picks: 1–3	October 17, 2006	
1	The Complete First Season	December 12, 2011	
2	Nick Picks: Holiday	September 26, 2006	
2	Nick Picks #5	March 13, 2007	
2	The Complete Second Season	December 12, 2011	
3	The Complete Third Season	December 12, 2011	
	The Complete Series		May 16, 2012
	The Complete Series		March 9, 2022

== Reception ==
=== Critical reception ===
Sean Aitchison from CBR wrote positively of the show stating, "Aside from the look of the show, My Life as a Teenage Robot had a fun premise that made for some great action comedy storytelling, and it definitely holds up [in modern day]. Though the show's depiction of teendom is somewhat outdated, the cliches actually end up working in favor of the humor. Though there's not a lot of story progression throughout the series, My Life as a Teenage Robot is still a whole lot of fun." Lynne Heffley from The Los Angeles Times wrote "Messages for a ‘tween audience about fitting in and friendship and the like are at the core of the outlandish episodes, but a lavish lacing of past and present pop-culture references are clearly there for adult amusement." Joly Herman of Common Sense Media wrote more negatively of the show, saying that, "Though it looks cool and has an upbeat energy, the show can be a bit of a drag. Some kids may enjoy it for the mindless entertainment it intends to be, but know that there are much better uses of a free half-hour."

=== Awards and nominations ===
Year	Award	Category	Nominee	Result	Ref.
2004	31st Annie Awards	Outstanding Directing in an Animated Television Production	Rob Renzetti for "Ragged Android"	Nominated	
2004	31st Annie Awards	Outstanding Production Design in an Animated Television Production	Joseph Holt for My Life As A Teenage Robot	Nominated	
2004	31st Annie Awards	Outstanding Production Design in an Animated Television Production	Seonna Hong for My Life As A Teenage Robot	Nominated	
2004	31st Annie Awards	Outstanding Voice Acting in an Animated Television Production	Janice Kawaye as "Jenny"	Nominated	
2004	31st Annie Awards	Outstanding Voice Acting in an Animated Television Production	Candi Milo as "Mrs. Wakeman"	Nominated	
2004	56th Primetime Emmy Awards	Outstanding Individual Achievement in Animation	Seonna Hong	Won	
2004	BMI Awards	BMI Cable Award	Peter Lurye for My Life As A Teenage Robot	Won	
2004	BMI Awards	BMI Cable Award	James Venable for My Life As A Teenage Robot	Won	
2005	32nd Annie Awards	Best Animated Television Production	My Life As A Teenage Robot	Nominated	
2005	32nd Annie Awards	Best Production Design in an Animated Television Production	Alex Kirwan for My Life As A Teenage Robot	Nominated	
2005	32nd Annie Awards	Best Voice Acting in an Animated Television Production	Candi Milo as "Mrs. Wakeman"	Nominated	
2006	33rd Annie Awards	Best Animated Television Production	My Life As A Teenage Robot	Nominated	
2006	33rd Annie Awards	Best Character Design in an Animated Television Production	Bryan Arnett for "Escape From Cluster Prime"	Nominated	
2006	33rd Annie Awards	Best Production Design in an Animated Television Production	Alex Kirwan for My Life As A Teenage Robot	Nominated	
2007	Golden Reel Awards	Best Sound Editing in Television: Animated	My Life As A Teenage Robot	Nominated	

== Possible crossover ==
In May 2026, Jorge R. Gutierrez, the creator of El Tigre: The Adventures of Manny Rivera, revealed that he was in talks about a potential revival of the series for Paramount+ and expressed interest in having it be a crossover with My Life as a Teenage Robot as well as Invader Zim.

== Other media ==
Jenny was featured as a playable character in the PlayStation 2, Wii, and Nintendo DS versions of Nicktoons: Attack of the Toybots with Janice Kawaye reprising her role as the character. Jenny also appears as a playable character in the mobile game Nickelodeon Super Brawl Universe, the fighting game Nickelodeon All-Star Brawl and its sequel, and the kart racing game Nickelodeon Kart Racers 3: Slime Speedway alongside Mrs. Wakeman, Brad, and Vexus as Chief power ups, with Kawaye reprising her role in the latter three games. One of Jenny's pre-fight lines in Nickelodeon All-Star Brawl ("You wouldn't like my brain! It's all circuity and metallic!") was removed from the game due to its association with an animated porn parody of My Life as a Teenage Robot created by Newgrounds animator Zone. Jenny also appears as a character skin for Smite, and was available during a July 2022 event.

On August 1, 2023, in commemoration of the series' 20th anniversary, creator Rob Renzetti began publishing a web story based on the series in his personal newsletter. Titled "Alternaversity", the story was written by Renzetti, with illustrations initially by My Life as a Teenage Robot art director Alex Kirwan, and later by storyboard artist Heather Martinez. The final chapter released on May 6, 2025.

== See also ==
- Astro Boy – Japanese manga series following an android main character.
- Mega Man – a Japanese video game series following an android main character by Capcom.
- Robotboy – a European cartoon with a similar premise of an android trying to be a normal kid.
