= Mina and the Count =

- A poster for the Mina and the Count segment on Nickelodeon's Oh Yeah! Cartoons.
- Genre: Comedy horror; Fantasy; Black comedy; Gothic horror
- Created by: Rob Renzetti
- Based on: Dracula by Bram Stoker
- Written by: Rob Renzetti
- Directed by: Rob Renzetti
- Voices of: Ashley Johnson; Tara Strong; Mark Hamill; Jeff Bennett; Michael Bell; Candi Milo
- Composers: Thomas Chase; Stephen Rucker
- Country of origin: United States
- Original language: English
- No. of episodes: 6

Production
- Executive producers: Larry Huber; Fred Seibert (Oh Yeah! Cartoons episodes); Buzz Potamkin ("Interlude with a Vampire" only)
- Producer: Rob Renzetti
- Running time: 7 minutes
- Production companies: Hanna-Barbera Cartoons ("Interlude with a Vampire" only); Frederator Incorporated (Oh Yeah! Cartoons episodes); Nickelodeon Animation Studios (Oh Yeah! Cartoons episodes)

Original release
- Network: Cartoon Network
- Release: November 5, 1995
- Network: Nickelodeon
- Release: March 18, 1998 – December 18, 1999

Related
- My Life as a Teenage Robot; What a Cartoon! Oh Yeah! Cartoons

Mina and the Count is an American animated television series created by Rob Renzetti, which was never brought into development as a full-fledged series. Instead, animated shorts of this series aired on both of Fred Seibert's animation anthology showcases, Cartoon Network's What a Cartoon! and Nickelodeon's Oh Yeah! Cartoons.

== Summary ==
The original Mina and the Count pilot short, "Interlude with a Vampire", premiered on the What a Cartoon! show on Cartoon Network on November 5, 1995, making it the only short to be featured on both creator-guided short projects guided by Fred Seibert. The short was about a seven-year-old girl named Mina Harper (a play on Dracula character Mina Harker) and her encounters with Vlad, a 700-year-old vampire. The aforementioned further episodes concerned the vampire, known simply as Vlad the Count, his best friend Mina, her older sister Lucy, school bully Nick, Lucy and Mina's father Mr. Harper, a handful of monsters and Vlad's disapproving servant Igor. Everything seems to occur in a little town in North America where Mina's school and house is, including the Count's castle.

== Characters ==
=== Main characters ===
- Wilhelmina "Mina" Harper (voiced by Ashley Johnson in the first short, Tara Strong in all subsequent shorts): A 7-year-old girl with thick long red hair in a ponytail and red clothes. She likes to go to school and to play with her toys, and she doesn't get along with her sister Lucy. She meets Vlad one night and they become best friends. At school, Nick the school bully picks on her. The squeamish Martha is probably her only human friend. Mina knows how to cook, but unfortunately for Vlad, doesn't know that vampires find garlic hazardous.
- Count Vlad (voiced by Mark Hamill): A 700-year-old immortal vampire with light blue skin and a blue cape and a black suit. In the past, he made a living drinking young women's blood. Thanks to Mina, he represses his evil tendencies. Vlad has many powers, including the ability to transform into a bat or mist, use telekinesis, and hypnotize people and animals to do his bidding. He finds comics and toys amusing and is very intelligent. Vlad believes that human food is disgusting.
- Igor (voiced by Jeff Bennett impersonating Peter Lorre): Vlad's hunchbacked servant who wears sandals and green clothes and always has a maniacal laugh. He loathes Mina because she turned Vlad into a loving man, though he still tries to do what is best for his master. Igor hates kisses, hugs, love, and everything near to it. In his free time, he likes to watch television.
- Mr. Harper (voiced by Michael Bell): Lucy and Mina's strict yet loving father with black hair. He is unaware that Vlad is a vampire. Mr. Harper initially believes he is a life-size doll with odd body odor. Later, he believes the Count is Mina's violin teacher and has him over for dinner. Mr. Harper is polite, but bemused by the Count's behavior and dismisses him as a "crazy European."
- Lucille "Lucy" Harper (voiced by Candi Milo): Mina's older sister with long blonde hair. She has a boyfriend named Bobby, who doesn't appear much. Lucy also has a crush on Vlad, and Lucy doesn't know that he's a vampire. Lucy doesn't get along with Mina, but deep down she cares about her little sister.

=== Other characters ===
- Frankenstein's Monster (voiced by Jeff Bennett): A friend of Count Dracula who made two appearances and is often nicknamed "Frank". In "FrankenFrog", he was supposed to be operated and later bonded with Mina's FrankenFrog experiment. In "The Ghoul's Tribunal", Frank often plays cards with Vlad, Gill-man, and Mummy while being violently jealous to anyone that hits on his wife.

== Episodes ==
Note: The original pilot aired on What a Cartoon!, and the rest were animated shorts that aired on Oh Yeah! Cartoons.

According to Rob Renzetti, 6 shorts were initially supposed to be in development for Oh Yeah!, but the Nickelodeon executives canceled the final short as they were uncomfortable with the series' concept later down the line. Seibert convinced Renzetti to use the final slot to develop the pilot of what later became the series My Life as a Teenage Robot.

No.	Title	Directed by	Written by	Storyboard by	Original release date
1	"Interlude with a Vampire"	C. Miles Thompson (art), Rob Renzetti (direction)	Rob Renzetti	Alex Kirwan	November 5, 1995
After a young girl named Mina Harper goes to bed for the night, Vlad the Count visits her. First coming to suck out the blood of a teenage girl. But by Igor's mistake, Vlad ended up in Mina's room. Note: This is the only Mina and the Count animated short to be produced by Hanna-Barbera, to air as part of What a Cartoon!, and the only time Ashley Johnson voices Mina.
2	"My Best Friend"	Rob Renzetti	Rob Renzetti	Alex Kirwan	March 18, 1998
Mina is bullied by Nick at her school, so she asks Vlad for advice against bullies. She tries several things, but nothing worked. And so, Vlad decides to take matter in his own hands. Note: Beginning with this short, Tara Strong replaces Ashley Johnson as the voice of Mina.
3	"FrankenFrog"	Rob Renzetti	Rob Renzetti	Alex Kirwan and Rob Renzetti	May 15, 1999
After Mina and Vlad "revive" Mina's doll when Vlad was supposed to be operating on Frank, she wants to do the same at dissection day with the frog Nick had cut apart. However, everyone at school is terrified of the frog and chaos ensues. So Vlad heads out so he can stop the frog.
4	"The Ghoul's Tribunal"	Rob Renzetti	Rob Renzetti	Rob Renzetti and Alex Kirwan	June 10, 1999
Vlad's friends Mummy, Gill-man, and Frank (who brought his wife) come over to play some cards, but discover that he hangs around with Mina and drag him for the Ghoul's Tribunal. With Dr. Freckle as the judge, Igor tries to figure out a way to fix what he had done with help from Mina.
5	"The Vampire Who Came to Dinner"	Rob Renzetti	Rob Renzetti	Alex Kirwan and Rob Renzetti	November 7, 1999
Vlad is invited by Mina to dinner along with her older sister Lucy and her father. But when Vlad meets Lucy, he becomes very tempted with her blood, and she even has a crush on Vlad. And to make things even worse, he has to eat human food too.
6	"Playing a Hunch"	Rob Renzetti	Rob Renzetti	Andy Bialk and Zac Moncrief	December 18, 1999
Vlad had invited Mina over, although Igor didn't want that anymore. So Vlad tries to hide Mina so that Igor won't discover that Mina is in the castle.
