= Greg Miller (animator) =

American animator

- Born: Pittsburgh, Pennsylvania
- Occupations: Storyboard artist, animator, director, writer, composer
- Years active: 1997–present
- Known for: Whatever Happened to... Robot Jones?
- Website: Official blog

Greg Miller is an American animator, cartoonist, writer, storyboard artist, and composer. His art style is based on the animation style of Schoolhouse Rock!, which was used in his own television series, Whatever Happened to... Robot Jones?, airing on Cartoon Network from 2002 to 2003 and his short film, The Wizzard of Krudd, a canceled Nickelodeon short featuring the voice of Devon Werkheiser as the protagonist. He worked on the production of Shrek the Third and Monsters vs. Aliens as the additional storyboard artist. His recent credits include being a storyboard artist, writer, animator and character designer on Secret Mountain Fort Awesome, Gravity Falls and Uncle Grandpa.

== Early life and education ==
Miller grew up in Upper St. Clair, Pennsylvania, near Pittsburgh. He graduated from Upper St. Clair High School in 1992 and went on to attend the University of the Arts in Philadelphia. While there, he earned an internship at Hanna-Barbera that would eventually lead him to drop out of college after receiving a job offer to work on Dexter's Laboratory.

== Career ==
Miller began his career at Hanna-Barbera as a writer and storyboard artist for Dexter's Laboratory which aired on Cartoon Network. He also later worked on Cow and Chicken and The Powerpuff Girls as a member of the production company. In between stints at Hanna-Barbera, he worked for Nickelodeon (on CatDog and The Angry Beavers) and at Disney (on Nightmare Ned).

While working at Hanna-Barbera, he pitched the company a new show called Whatever Happened to... Robot Jones?. Hanna-Barbera declined, prompting Miller to take the pitch directly to Cartoon Network. Cartoon Network purchased the pilot along with the pilots of 9 other shows with the intent of trying them all out over one summer. Cartoon Network executives chose 3 (including Robot Jones) to be voted on by viewers in August 2000 in an event known as The Big Pick or Big Pick Weekend. Robot Jones received 23% of the vote, finishing second and losing out to The Grim Adventures of Billy & Mandy created by Maxwell Atoms.

== Filmography ==
=== Film ===
Year	Title	Notes
2000	The Tangerine Bear	Character clean-up
2007	Shrek the Third	Additional story artist
2007	The Wizzard of Krudd	Creator, writer, art director, voice director, co-executive producer, director
2009	Monsters vs. Aliens	Additional story artist
2010	Shrek Forever After	Additional story artist

=== Television ===
Project	Show run	Channel	Credited role	# of episodes
Dexter's Laboratory	1996–2003	Cartoon Network	Writer, storyboard artist	4 episodes
A Kitty Bobo Show	2001	Cartoon Network	Animation layout	1 episode
The Grim Adventures of Billy & Mandy	2001	Cartoon Network	Writer, storyboard artist	1 episode
Evil Con Carne	2001–2004	Cartoon Network	Storyboard artist	2 episodes
Whatever Happened to... Robot Jones?	2002–2003	Cartoon Network	Creator, developer, writer, director (season 1), storyboard artist, character designer, animator, composer, executive producer	13 episodes
My Life as a Teenage Robot	2005–2009	Nickelodeon	Director, sheet timer	3 episodes
Johnny Test	2005-2006	Kids' WB	Animation and timing director	5 episodes
SpongeBob SquarePants	2007	Nickelodeon	Writer, storyboard director	1 episode, "Blackened Sponge"
MAD	2010–2013	Cartoon Network	Animator	10 episodes
The Problem Solverz	2011–2013	Cartoon Network	Supervising director	26 episodes
Secret Mountain Fort Awesome	2011–2012	Cartoon Network	Writer, storyboard artist	5 episodes
The Mr. Peabody & Sherman Show	2015–2017	Netflix	Director	15 episodes
Home: Adventures with Tip & Oh	2016–2018	Netflix	Supervising director	
The Adventures of Rocky and Bullwinkle	2018–2019	Amazon Video	Director	11 episodes
The Mighty Ones	2020–2022	Hulu/Peacock	Co-executive producer, supervising producer, storyboard artist, writer	

== Accolades ==
Date	Award	Category	Work	Shared with	Result	Ref
2016	Daytime Emmy Awards	Outstanding Directing in an Animated Program	The Mr. Peabody & Sherman Show	Mike Bell and John Sanford	Nominated	
2017	Daytime Emmy Awards	Outstanding Directing in an Animated Program	The Mr. Peabody & Sherman Show	—N/a	Nominated	
2018	Daytime Emmy Awards	Outstanding Directing in an Animated Program	The Mr. Peabody & Sherman Show	Mike Bell, John Sanford, and David P. Smith	Nominated	
2019	Daytime Emmy Awards	Outstanding Directing for an Animated Program	The Adventures of Rocky and Bullwinkle	Howie Perry, Kristi Reed, and Chuck Sheetz	Nominated	
2020	Daytime Emmy Awards	Outstanding Directing for an Animated Program	The Adventures of Rocky and Bullwinkle	Howie Perry and Chuck Sheetz	Nominated	
