= Whatever Happened to... Robot Jones? =

American animated television series

- Genre: Animated comedy; Slice of life; Science fiction
- Created by: Greg Miller
- Developed by: Mike Stern; Greg Miller
- Directed by: Greg Miller (pilot, season 1); Rob Renzetti (pilot, season 1); Steve Socki (season 2)
- Voices of: Text-to-speech voices: Junior (original voice); Fred; Human voices: Bobby Block (redubbed version); Grey DeLisle; Gary LeRoi Gray; Myles Jeffrey; Kyle Sullivan; Jeff Bennett
- Theme music composer: The Invisible Car
- Opening theme: "Do the Robot"
- Composers: Greg Miller; Mike Stern (season 2)
- Country of origin: United States
- Original language: English
- No. of seasons: 2
- No. of episodes: 13 (27 segments)

Production
- Executive producer: Greg Miller
- Running time: 22 minutes
- Production company: Cartoon Network Studios (Note: Pilot produced by Hanna-Barbera.)

Original release
- Network: Cartoon Network
- Release: July 19, 2002 – November 14, 2003

Related
- What a Cartoon!

Whatever Happened to... Robot Jones? (simply known as Robot Jones or WHTRJ?) is an American animated television series created by Greg Miller for Cartoon Network. It follows the eponymous Robot Jones, a young robot who attends the fictional suburban Polyneux Middle School in a retrofuturistic version of the 1980s. Episodes follow Robot Jones researching aspects of human life, including music, facial hair, and gym class. Jones has friends in three boys: Socks, Mitch, and Cubey. Robot Jones is often smitten with his crush, Shannon Westerburg, a tall girl with orthodontic headgear and a prosthesis. In school, Robot Jones interacts with his teachers, Mr. McMcMc, Mr. Workout, and Mrs. Raincoat; the principal, Mr. Madman; and janitor Clancy Q. Sleepyjeans. His arch-rivals, Lenny and Denny Yogman, try to sabotage Jones' research by making school more difficult for him.

Miller's first pilot aired on Cartoon Network on June 16, 2000, as part of "Voice Your Choice Weekend", a contest in which previously unaired pilots were broadcast for viewers to decide which should be given a full series. Even though the Robot Jones pilot ranked second below Grim & Evil in the event, Robot Jones was greenlit for its own series, which premiered on July 19, 2002. The first season voice of Robot Jones was created with a Microsoft Word 98 text-to-speech function on a Macintosh computer. Beginning with the second season, Robot Jones' voice was dubbed over by child actor Bobby Block, and reruns of the first season were re-dubbed with Block's voice overs.

== Premise ==
Promotional image featuring the series' main characters. From left to right: Cubey, Socks, Robot Jones, and Shannon

Robot Jones (voiced by a text-to-speech program in the pilot and season 1; Bobby Block in season 2 and season 1 reruns) is a young robot living in a fictional early 1980s version of Delaware where robots are commonplace. Robot attempts to learn human culture by attending Polyneux Middle School with his new friends: Timothy "Socks" Morton (Kyle Sullivan), a tall boy who loves rock music; Mitch Davis (Gary LeRoi Gray), a headphones-wearing boy whose eyes are hidden by his long hair; and Charles "Cubey" Cubinacle (Myles Jeffrey), a shorter boy who loves video games. He holds an unrequited crush on Shannon Westerburg (Grey DeLisle), a girl with a large retainer and prosthetic metal leg.

In each episode, Robot Jones explores a concept faced by average students, such as gym class or competitions. Robot immerses himself in each subject to fully understand it while trying to fit in with his human peers, but this is challenging due to his social ineptitude and others' lack of understanding. As Robot settles in at school, he explores humanoid concepts of his own will. Though the situations he finds himself in are usually at his parents' insistence, others are a result of Robot trying to get closer to Shannon. An example is in "Summer Camp" when Socks convinces Robot to go camping and Robot discovers the ability to feel jealous. Due to his polite nature and short stature, students at his school tend to ignore Robot or are oblivious to his existence. His good grades, poor social skills, and status as a robot are at odds with Principal Madman (Jeff Bennett), a technophobic principal, Mr. McMcMc (Rip Taylor), a jealous and insecure math teacher, and Lenny (Josh Peck) and Denny (Austin Stout) Yogman, two genius twin brothers. At the end of an episode, Robot reads a "data log entry" about what he learned that day and what conclusions he has arrived at on humanity.

The opening sequence, in which Robot Jones is factory-assembled and inserted into a school bus, is an homage to that of 1980s children's show You Can't Do That on Television. When the title of the show is spoken, a group of young children voice the "Whatever Happened to..." part in unison while the "Robot Jones?" part is done by a Macintosh Macintalk voice known as Trinoids. The first season has children speaking out episode titles while season 2 episode titles are spoken by voices of the characters.

== Characters ==
- Robot Jones (voiced by a text-to-speech program in season 1, Bobby Block in season 2 and season 1 reruns)
- Timothy "Socks" Morton (voiced by Kyle Sullivan)
- Mitch Davis (voiced by Gary LeRoi Gray)
- Charles "Cubey" Cubinacle (voiced by Myles Jeffrey)
- Shannon Westerburg (voiced by Grey DeLisle)
- Lenny Yogman (voiced by Josh Peck)
- Denny Yogman (voiced by Austin Stout)
- Mom Unit (voiced by Grey DeLisle)
- Dad Unit (voiced by a text-to-speech program)
- Principal Madman (voiced by Maurice LaMarche/Jeff Bennett)
- Mr. McMcMc (voiced by Maurice LaMarche/Rip Taylor)
- Mr. Werkaut (voiced by Dee Bradley Baker)
- Mrs. Raincoat (voiced by Grey DeLisle)
- Clancy Q. Sleepyjeans (voiced by David Koechner)

== Production ==
Greg Miller's original series pilot aired on Cartoon Network on June 16, 2000, in a contest featuring 11 animated shorts to be chosen for a spot on the network's 2000 schedule. During the weekend of August 25–27, 2000, all 11 pilots aired as part of a 52-hour marathon called "Voice Your Choice Weekend", in which viewers would vote for their favorite pilots. While Grim & Evil won the contest with 57% of the vote, Robot Jones came in second place with 23% and was given its own series run beginning July 19, 2002.

Robot Jones's animation style can be seen as a throwback to 1970s and 1980s cartoons such as Schoolhouse Rock!, with an intentionally messy and rough look; it also strongly resembles classic newspaper comic strips such as Calvin and Hobbes. The series' animation technique is different from most American cartoons from the early 2000s. It was animated with traditional cel animation, at a time when many American cartoons had switched to digital ink and paint. The show was animated at Rough Draft Studios in Seoul, South Korea.

Greg Miller stated in an interview on Facebook that he used a Microsoft Word 97 text-to-speech software on his old Macintosh computer for Robot's voice during production for season one, but after the first season was completed, the executives of Cartoon Network didn't like how it sounded. Child actor Bobby Block was chosen to take the role of Robot in season two. Robot Jones' text-to-speech voice was also recorded for production of the second season, but because the voice change happened during the production of those episodes, this voice was never dubbed into the final prints. In that interview, he also said that he would want to do a revival of Robot Jones, but it would be up to Cartoon Network.

The aforementioned interview also revealed that the show was originally planned to be about Robot Jones growing up in the style of The Wonder Years only to take over the world in the style of The Terminator, and when asked how the show would have ended, Greg Miller explained it would end in the show's version of the 1990s with Robot Jones rallying a robot army to attack the human race. Greg Miller also mentioned in another interview that he originally planned for the series to have a music video every episode, each one in a different style of music, but that was ultimately shot down by the network.

Greg Miller also confirmed a few things on his Twitter about the production. A big inspiration for the visual language was an anime called Chibi Maruko Chan where in a dramatic moment or intense emotion the background changes. Another thing borrowed from Chibi Maruko Chan was the characters turning white when they were overcome with emotion. In addition, a lot of speculation began in the 21st Century regarding the character of Principal Madman bearing a resemblance to Adolf Hitler. Miller cleared this up stating he was based on Mr. Schidtler from Nickelodeon's You Can't Do That on Television (portrayed by Les Lye), and that any resemble to the former was coincidental.

== Episodes ==
=== Series overview ===
Season	Episodes	Originally aired	
Season	Episodes	First aired	Last aired
Pilot		June 16, 2000	
1	6	July 19, 2002	September 13, 2002
2	7	October 3, 2003	November 14, 2003

=== Pilot (2000) ===
Title	Directed by	Written by	Original release date
"Whatever Happened to Robot Jones?"	Greg Miller and Rob Renzetti	Greg Miller	June 16, 2000
Robot Jones is informed by his parents, Mom Unit and Dad Unit, that he has been put into a human public school that he must now attend. While in math class, he believes that the problems are too easy for him, which results in him getting sent to Principal Madman's office for being condescending to the teacher Mr. McMcMc. Later the same day as all of the school kids are eating lunch, Principal Madman trips on a wire which he later finds out is Robot's charger cable. After finding out it was Robot Jones, he gives him three months detention for tripping him, which angers Robot so much that he starts malfunctioning and firing lasers out of his eyes, setting the room on fire and scaring everyone away. Later, he rants about the humans in the hallway and almost gives up completely on them, until he develops a crush on a girl named Shannon because of her braces, which he designates as "high metal content". He then realizes that humans are not all that bad and that he needs to study them more. Note: This episode was later aired as the first segment along with "Electric Boogaloo" and "The Groovesicle."

=== Season 1 (2002) ===
No. overall	No. in season	Title	Directed by	Written by	Storyboard by	Original release date	Prod. code
1	1	"P.U. to P.E." "Vacuum Friend"	Greg Miller	Greg Miller	Kevin Kaliher and Mike Stern	July 19, 2002	103
"P.U. to P.E.": Robot Jones fears taking a shower in gym class because he thinks he will rust. "Vacuum Friend": Robot Jones befriends a vacuum cleaner after thinking humans and robots cannot be friends.
2	2	"Cube Wars" "Sickness"	Greg Miller	Greg Miller, Kevin Kaliher, and Mike Bell	Kevin Kaliher and Mike Bell	July 26, 2002	105
"Cube Wars": Everyone becomes obsessed with solving their Rubik's Revenge (called Wonder Cubes on the show), but Robot Jones' superior mind allows him to solve it almost instantly. The Yogmans sabotage Robot's cube, however, and he begins to malfunction. "Sickness": The Yogmans prank Robot Jones by inserting a virus-filled floppy disk in Robot's disk drive, and he becomes very ill.
3	3	"Parents" "Embarrassment"	Greg Miller	Greg Miller, Dave Smith, and Paul Tibbitt	Dave Smith and Paul Tibbitt	August 2, 2002	104
"Parents": Robot Jones must bring his parents to parent-teacher night at the middle school. When his parents embarrass him, Robot Jones attempts to manually override them to control their behavior, but fails. "Embarrassment": Robot Jones wants to ask out Shannon to the Harvest Dance, but his nervousness causes his exhaust to malfunction whenever he gets near her.
4	4	"Politics" "Growth Spurts"	Greg Miller	Greg Miller	Kevin Kaliher and Mike Stern	August 9, 2002	102
"Politics": Robot Jones runs for student council president. "Growth Spurts": Robot Jones modifies himself to be tall enough to be on the basketball team.
5	5	"Pilot" "Electric Boogaloo" "The Groovesicle"	Greg Miller and Rob Renzetti	Greg Miller	Greg Miller and Mike Stern	August 24, 2002	101
"Pilot": Rerun of the pilot episode. "Electric Boogaloo": Lenny and Denny Yogman try to trick Robot Jones into being his friend so they can steal his brain. "The Groovesicle": Robot Jones and Socks watch an episode of "The Groovesicle", a music video TV series featuring a performance by a band called "The Lavender Fudge Experience".
6	6	"Jealousy" "Scantron Love"	Greg Miller	Greg Miller, Clay Morrow and Walt Dohrn	Clay Morrow and Walt Dohrn	September 13, 2002	106
"Jealousy": Robot Jones feels jealousy towards an android named Finkman, who manages to make Shannon fall for him (as well as the rest of the school). "Scantron Love": Robot befriends the school's Scantron machine in order to get the answers for his history tests, and soon passes out the answers to the rest of the students in class.

=== Season 2 (2003) ===
No. overall	No. in season	Title	Animation direction by	Written by	Storyboard by	Original release date	Prod. code
7	1	"Gender" "Math Challenge"	Don Judge and Tom Yasumi	Greg Miller, Kevin Kaliher, and Charlie Bean	Kevin Kaliher and Charlie Bean	October 3, 2003	201
"Gender": Robot Jones struggles to understand the differences between human boys and girls. "Math Challenge": Mr. McMcMc challenges Robot Jones to a math competition to determine who is the smarter one of the two. Note: This is the first episode to use the voice actor Bobby Block to play Robot Jones.
8	2	"Family Vacation" "Hair"	Rich Collado and Dave Marshall	Greg Miller, Clayton Morrow and Chuck Klein	Clayton Morrow and Chuck Klein	October 10, 2003	202
"Family Vacation": Socks goes on a spring break vacation together with Robot and his family, but Robot's parents have an unusual idea of what a vacation entails. Guest star: Randy Savage as the Biker. "Hair": Seeing other boys in school with hair makes Robot want hair of his own to impress Shannon, but he must find a creative way to generate some on his metallic body.
9	3	"Garage Band" "Work"	Don Judge, Brian Sheesley, & Steve Socki	Greg Miller, Brian Larsen, & Mike Stern	Brian Larsen & Mike Stern	October 17, 2003	203
"Garage Band": After witnessing girls at their school get excited for a garage band, Robot, Socks, Cubey, and Mitch decide to form a band of their own. But they focus more on being cool rather than actually practicing their instruments, which confuses Robot as to what being in band is about. "Work": Robot Jones gets a job at JNZ to make extra money, but finds it increasingly difficult to stay awake juggling a job, school, and time at the arcade with friends.
10	4	"The Yogmans Strike Back" "Hookie 101"	Don Judge and Tom Yasumi	Greg Miller, Charlie Bean, and Kevin Kaliher	Charlie Bean and Kevin Kaliher	October 24, 2003	204
"The Yogmans Strike Back": After another failed attempts to corner Robot, the Yogmans hypnotize Robot's friends and turn them into an amalgamation robot called the "Yogstrosity". "Hookie 101": Robot, Socks, Cubey, and Mitch all play hookie.
11	5	"House Party" "School Newspaper"	Don Judge and Steve Socki	Greg Miller, Clay Morrow and William Reiss	Clay Morrow and William Reiss	October 31, 2003	205
"House Party": Robot Jones throws a big party at his house while his parents are away, but worries about getting caught by Gramps Unit, who dislikes humans. "School Newspaper": On Madman's order, Robot Jones gets a job for the school newspaper and ends up writing stories that embarrass the principal.
12	6	"Safety Patrol" "Popularity"	Rich Collado and Tom Yasumi	Greg Miller, Mark O'Hare and Carl Greenblatt	Mark O'Hare and Carl Greenblatt	November 7, 2003	206
"Safety Patrol": When Robot Jones is put on the school's safety patrol, his programming for perfection causes him to go overboard with enforcing the rules. "Popularity": Robot Jones sends a decoy version of himself to school so that he can attend a robotics expo, but the decoy ends up becoming popular with his classmates.
13	7	"Summer Camp" "Rules of Dating"	Brian Sheesley, Rich Collado and Steve Socki	Greg Miller, Chris Reccardi & Paul Tibbitt	Chris Reccardi and Paul Tibbitt	November 14, 2003	207
"Summer Camp": Despite disliking the outdoors, Robot Jones tries to impress Shannon by showing off his nature skills at a summer camp. "Rules of Dating": Robot attempts to impress Shannon, but his efforts are marred by restrictions enforced on him by the "Laws of Robotics".

== Broadcast ==
After production ceased on Robot Jones, it aired in syndication before being removed from Cartoon Network's schedule. Robot Jones makes a cameo appearance on the OK K.O.! Let's Be Heroes episode "Crossover Nexus" that aired October 8, 2018, along with other Cartoon Network characters from current and ended shows.

Robot Jones appears in the Jellystone! special "Crisis of the Infinite Mirths" along with other Cartoon Network characters. Jones is voiced by Jim Conroy.

== See also ==
- List of fictional robots and androids
- List of science fiction universes
