= Rob Renzetti =

American animator (born 1967)

- Born: Robert John Renzetti; September 12, 1967 (age 59); Chicago, Illinois, U.S.
- Education: California Institute of the Arts
- Occupations: Animator; writer
- Years active: 1991–present
- Known for: Mina and the Count; My Life as a Teenage Robot; The Horrible Bag of Terrible Things; Dexter's Laboratory; The Powerpuff Girls; Family Guy; Foster's Home For Imaginary Friends
- Spouse: Tracy Royce (m. 2000)
- Website: robrenzetti.com

Robert John Renzetti (born September 12, 1967) is an American animator and writer. He is known for creating the animated series My Life as a Teenage Robot and Mina and the Count for Nickelodeon, as well as directing Dexter's Laboratory, The Powerpuff Girls, and Samurai Jack for Cartoon Network. He served as the animation director for Sym-Bionic Titan, supervising producer for Disney Channel's animated series Gravity Falls, and an executive producer for Big City Greens. In addition, he was a story editor and co-executive producer on Kid Cosmic (2021–2023) for Netflix and released his first original novel, The Horrible Bag of Terrible Things (2023), through Penguin Group.

== Early life ==
Renzetti, born in Chicago and raised in Addison, Illinois, was an art history major at the University of Illinois at Urbana-Champaign. After graduating from Illinois, Renzetti attended the animation program at Columbia College Chicago for one year, where he was a classmate of Genndy Tartakovsky. Renzetti and Tartakovsky were then both accepted into the California Institute of the Arts, where they were roommates.

== Career ==
After graduating from the California Institute of the Arts, Renzetti began his animating career in Spain, working on 5 episodes for Batman: The Animated Series.

Renzetti has been writer, director, and storyboard artist for several Cartoon Network shows, including 2 Stupid Dogs, Dexter's Laboratory, The Powerpuff Girls, Samurai Jack, and Foster's Home for Imaginary Friends. He won an Emmy Award in 2009 for his work on the latter. During the mid-1990s, he created Mina and the Count, a series of animated shorts that premiered on the What a Cartoon! show then later aired for a short time on the similar anthology series Oh Yeah! Cartoons. In 1999, he made the short "My Neighbor Was a Teenage Robot", which also debuted on Oh Yeah! Cartoons; in 2003, My Life as a Teenage Robot, based on the short, debuted on Nickelodeon. In April 2008, he started work on Cartoon Network's The Cartoonstitute project, where he served as supervising producer.

He was story editor on My Little Pony: Friendship Is Magic for the series' first two seasons, but left in 2011, soon after the departure of the series showrunner, Lauren Faust, to work as the supervising producer and a story editor on Disney's Gravity Falls. He subsequently worked on Disney's Big City Greens as one of its executive producers for the first season. In 2021, he served as executive producer and co-writer on Craig McCracken's Kid Cosmic for Netflix.

Renzetti has co-written four books based on various Disney properties, including Dipper's and Mabel's Guide to Mystery and Nonstop Fun!, the New York Times Bestseller Gravity Falls: Journal 3, DuckTales: Solving Mysteries and Rewriting History, and Onward: Quests of Yore. His first original novel, The Horrible Bag of Terrible Things, was released in July 2023. A new installment in The Horrible Series, The Twisted Tower of Endless Torment, was released in July 2024, with the third novel potentially already being in the works.

== Filmography ==
=== Film ===
Year	Title	Role
1991	Dudley's Classroom Adventure	animator
2024	Big City Greens the Movie: Spacecation	timing director

=== Television ===
Year	Title	Role	Notes
1993–1995	2 Stupid Dogs	writer storyboard artist director	
1995	Dumb and Dumber	storyboard artist	
1995–1997	Dexter's Laboratory	director storyboard artist animation director	
1995	Mina and the Count	creator writer producer director	
1998	Oh Yeah! Cartoons	producer	Episode: "The F-Tales"
1998	The Powerpuff Girls	writer storyboard artist director	1.7: Mr. Mojo's Rising 4.7: Nano of the North; Episode 4.8: Stray Bullet
2000	Family Guy	director	Episode 2.18: "E. Peterbus Unum"; Episode 3.6: "Death Lives"
2001	Time Squad	storyboard artist	Episode 1.5a: "Dishonest Abe"; Episode 1.12b: "Where the Buffalo Bill Roams"
2001–2002	House of Mouse	storyboard artist timing director	
2001–2002, 2017	Samurai Jack	sheet timer director	
2002	Whatever Happened to... Robot Jones?	supervising producer director	
2003–2009	My Life as a Teenage Robot	creator developer writer executive producer director storyboard artist	
2006–2009	Foster's Home for Imaginary Friends	post supervising director story writer storyboard artist director	
2009	Random! Cartoons	sheet timer director	Episode: "6 Monsters"
2010–2011	Adventure Time	sheet timer	
2010–2011	Sym-Bionic Titan	sheet timer animation director	
2010–2011	My Little Pony: Friendship Is Magic	story editor	Seasons 1 and 2
2012–2016	Gravity Falls	supervising producer director story editor (season 1)	Episode 2.1: "Scary-Oke"
2018–2019	Big City Greens	executive producer	
2021–2022	Kid Cosmic	writer director co-executive producer	
2026-present	Adventure Time: Side Quests	writer	

=== Internet ===
Year	Title	Role	Notes
2015	Cartoons VS Cancer	Himself	Podcast
2016	Nickelodeon Animation Podcast	Himself	Podcast
2022	Mystery Shack Lookback	Himself	Podcast

== Bibliography ==
Year	Title	Publisher	ISBN	Notes
2014	Gravity Falls: Dipper and Mabel's Guide to Mystery and Nonstop Fun!	Disney Press	ISBN 978-1484710807	Co-written with Shane Houghton
2016	Gravity Falls: Journal 3	Disney Press	ISBN 978-1484746691	Co-written with Alex Hirsch
2018	DuckTales: Solving Mysteries and Rewriting History	Disney Press	ISBN 978-1368008419	Co-written with Rachel Vine
2020	Onward: Quests of Yore	Disney Press	ISBN 978-1368052092	
2023	The Horrible Bag of Terrible Things	Penguin Workshop	ISBN 978-0593519523	
2024	The Twisted Tower of Endless Torment	Penguin Workshop	ISBN 978-0593519554	
