= List of animators =

This is a list of notable animators:

== A ==
- Shane Acker
- Andrew Adamson
- Takami Akai
- Kazuki Akane
- Alexandre Alexeieff
- Roger Allers
- Pete Alvarado
- Robert Alvarez
- Tetsurō Amino
- Ken Anderson
- Wes Anderson
- Bryan Andrews
- Mark Andrews
- Masashi Ando
- Hideaki Anno
- Danny Antonucci
- Ruben A. Aquino
- Shingo Araki
- Tetsurō Araki
- Wes Archer
- Shubhavi Arya
- Morio Asaka
- Kia Asamiya
- Kelly Asbury
- Toyoo Ashida
- Xavier Atencio
- Maxwell Atoms
- Virginie Augustin
- Tex Avery
- Abdelrahim Ahmed

== B ==
- Arthur Babbit
- Frédéric Back
- Mark Baker
- Ralph Bakshi
- Kyle Balda
- Joseph Barbera
- Alan Barillaro
- Cordell Barker
- Phyllis Barnhart
- Claude Barras
- Jiří Barta
- Craig Bartlett
- Berthold Bartosch
- Niko Barun
- Jules Bass
- Saul Bass
- Joy Batchelor
- Signe Baumane
- James Baxter
- Alan Becker
- Ed Benedict
- Drew Berry
- Tom Bertino
- Brad Bird
- Preston Blair
- Don Bluth
- Raphael Bob-Waksberg
- Ben Bocquelet
- Katsushi Boda
- Patrick Bokanowski
- David Bolinsky
- Walerian Borowczyk
- Bob Boyle
- Konstantin Bronzit
- Bruno Bozzetto
- Matt Braly
- Peter Browngardt
- David Bowers
- Joe Brumm
- Chris Buck
- Henry Burden
- Pete Burness
- Bill Burnett
- Tim Burton

== C ==
- Bob Camp
- Ivo Caprino
- Tim Cahill
- Julie McNally Cahill
- Wallace Carlson
- Enrico Casarosa
- Osvaldo Cavandoli
- Scott Cawthon
- Yuriko Chiba
- Koichi Chigira
- Sylvain Chomet
- Peter Chung
- Daniel Chong
- Bob Clampett
- Les Clark
- Ron Clements
- Jackie Cockle
- Pierre Coffin
- Émile Cohl
- Felix Colgrave
- Vince Collins
- Richard Condie
- Sandro Corsaro
- Brian Cosgrove
- Quirino Cristiani
- Sally Cruikshank
- Gabor Csupo
- Shamus Culhane
- Michael Cusack

== D ==
- Enzo D'Alò
- Eric Darnell
- Jim Danforth
- Arthur Davis
- John A. Davis
- Marc Davis
- Segundo de Chomón
- Dean DeBlois
- Gene Deitch
- Phil DeLara
- Kirk DeMicco
- Andreas Deja
- Osamu Dezaki
- Tetsu Dezaki
- John R. Dilworth
- Mark Dindal
- Michael Dante DiMartino
- Walt Disney
- Tsukasa Dokite
- Domics
- Paul Driessen
- Derek Drymon
- Michaël Dudok de Wit
- Piotr Dumała
- Jack Dunham
- Rama Duwaji

== E ==
- Ralph Eggleston
- Izzy Ellis
- Ed Emshwiller
- Jules Engel
- Edd Gould

== F ==
- Lauren Faust
- David Feiss
- Sam Fell
- Paul Fierlinger
- Don Figlozzi
- David Firth
- David Fine
- Oskar Fischinger
- Dave Fleischer
- Max Fleischer
- Friz Freleng
- Lillian Friedman
- Kazuhiro Furuhashi
- Akira Furuya

== G ==
- Todd John Galda
- Manuel García Ferré
- Paul Germain
- Ted Geisel
- Max Gilardi
- Terry Gilliam
- Bob Givens
- Petar Gligorovski
- Tsuneo Gōda
- Eric Goldberg
- Keiji Gotoh
- Edd Gould
- Manny Gould
- Mark Gravas
- C. H. Greenblatt
- Zlatko Grgić
- Paul Grimault
- Matt Groening
- Milt Gross
- Jorge R. Gutierrez
- Otmar Gutmann

== H ==
- Zach Hadel
- John Halas
- Mark Hall
- Lisa Hanawalt
- William Hanna
- Peter Hannan
- Arin Hanson
- Keiichi Hara
- Hugh Harman
- Cyriak Harris
- Ken Harris
- Ray Harryhausen
- Butch Hartman
- Emery Hawkins
- Ainslie Henderson
- Jim Henson
- Don Hertzfeldt
- Shinji Higuchi
- Stephen Hillenburg
- Nick Hilligoss
- Michi Himeno
- Christopher Hinton
- Hisashi Hirai
- Toshiki Hirano
- Hirokazu Hisayuki
- Takeshi Honda
- Yukiko Horiguchi
- Mamoru Hosoda
- Bu Hua
- Cary and Michael Huang
- Faith Hubley
- John Hubley
- Larry Huber
- Pixote Hunt
- Andreas Hykade
- Alex Hirsch

== I ==
- Sayuri Ichiishi
- Hiroyuki Imaishi
- Isamu Imakake
- Mutsumi Inomata
- Yasuhiro Irie
- Noboru Ishiguro
- Atsuko Ishizuka
- Rudolf Ising
- Mitsuo Iso
- Willie Ito
- Ikuko Itoh
- Ivan Ivanov-Vano
- Janet Iwasa
- Ub Iwerks

== J ==
- Jaiden Animations
- James Rallison
- Jazza
- Wilfred Jackson
- Hannah Jacobs
- Nick Jennings
- Graham Johnson
- Tim Johnson
- Ollie Johnston
- Chuck Jones
- Ian Jones-Quartey
- William Joyce
- JoWOnder
- Jim Jinkins
- Mike Judge

== K ==
- Megumi Kadonosono
- Milt Kahl
- Masaki Kajishima
- Narumi Kakinouchi
- Sachiko Kamimura
- Ryōki Kamitsubo
- Yoshinori Kanada
- Hiroshi Kanazawa
- Hiroki Kanno
- Christy Karacas
- Kunio Katō
- Yoshiaki Kawajiri
- Kihachirō Kawamoto
- Toshihiro Kawamoto
- Glen Keane
- William Kentridge
- Yoko Kikuchi
- Ward Kimball
- Hidefumi Kimura
- Takahiro Kimura
- Jack Kinney
- Hiroyuki Kitakubo
- Masaru Kitao
- Hiroyuki Kitazume
- Arlene Klasky
- Milton Knight
- Osamu Kobayashi
- Tomonori Kogawa
- Takeshi Koike
- Masayuki Kojima
- Kazuo Komatsubara
- Satoshi Kon
- Katsuya Kondō
- Bryan Konietzko
- Yoshifumi Kondō
- Bill Kopp
- John Korty
- Kitarō Kōsaka
- Yōichi Kotabe
- Junichi Kouchi
- John Kricfalusi
- Bill Kroyer
- Ayumi Kurashima
- Yōji Kuri
- Kazuya Kuroda
- Bob Kurtz
- Bob Kuwahara
- Tomoki Kyoda

== L ==
- Jean-François Laguionie
- Michael Lah
- René Laloux
- Evelyn Lambart
- Walter Lantz
- Eric Larson
- John Lasseter
- Caroline Leaf
- Phil Lord
- Peter Lord
- John Lounsbery
- Andy Luckey
- Bud Luckey
- Robert Lue
- Don Lusk
- Len Lye

== M ==
- Seth MacFarlane
- Mahiro Maeda
- Marcos Magalhães
- Johji Manabe
- Jeff "Swampy" Marsh
- Masao Maruyama
- Kenzō Masaoka
- Ryuji Masuda
- Mitsuyuki Masuhara
- Leiji Matsumoto
- Norman McCabe
- Winsor McCay
- Craig McCracken
- Malcolm McGookin
- Tom McGrath
- Aaron McGruder
- Patrick McHale
- Chris McKay
- Robert McKimson
- Norman McLaren
- Glenn McQueen
- Vivienne Medrano
- Bill Melendez
- Otto Messmer
- Sarah E. Meyer
- Pete Michels
- Haruhiko Mikimoto
- Christopher Miller
- Greg Miller
- Rob Minkoff
- Yutaka Minowa
- Toru Miura
- Hayao Miyazaki
- Tadahito Mochinaga
- Ram Mohan
- Phil Monroe
- Fred Moore
- Yasuji Mori
- Kōji Morimoto
- Katsuji Morishita
- Hiroyuki Morita
- Yuji Moriyama
- Joshua Mosley
- Phil Mulloy
- Shukō Murase
- Yasuji Murata
- Joe Murray
- Dave Mullins
- James Ford Murphy
- Kenneth Muse
- John Musker

== N ==
- Mamoru Nagano
- Atsuko Nakajima
- Ryūtarō Nakamura
- Takashi Nakamura
- Yutaka Nakamura
- Kazuto Nakazawa
- Grim Natwick
- Kenn Navarro
- Mike Nawrocki
- Lynne Naylor
- Brad Neely
- Malik Nejer
- Marv Newland
- Teddy Newton
- Chris Niosi
- Daisuke Nishio
- Yoshinobu Nishizaki
- Floyd Norman
- Yuri Norstein

== O ==
- Willis O'Brien
- Matthew O'Callaghan
- Ross O'Donovan
- Mark O'Hare
- Eileen O'Meara
- Masami Ōbari
- Michel Ocelot
- Steve Oedekerk
- Noburō Ōfuji
- Atsushi Ogasawara
- Fumitoshi Oizaki
- Tadanari Okamoto
- Tensai Okamura
- Hiroyuki Okiura
- Reiko Okuyama
- Takahiro Omori
- Joe Oriolo
- Phil Ortiz
- Hiroshi Ōsaka
- Mamoru Oshii
- Masaaki Ōsumi
- Katsuhiro Otomo
- Yasuo Ōtsuka
- Simon Otto
- Monty Oum

== P ==
- Juan Padrón
- Skyler Page
- Nina Paley
- Andrew Park
- Nick Park
- Trey Parker
- Priit Pärn
- Van Partible
- Ishu Patel
- Sanjay Patel
- Don Patterson
- Ray Patterson
- Michaela Pavlátová
- Everett Peck
- Janet Perlman
- PES
- Regina Pessoa
- Aleksandr Petrov
- Adam Phillips
- Jonti Picking
- Jan Pinkava
- Michael Please
- Bill Plympton
- Břetislav Pojar
- Oliver Postgate
- Julia Pott
- Gerald Potterton
- Dan Povenmire
- Barry Purves

== Q ==
- Corky Quakenbush
- Brothers Quay
- Ryan Quincy
- Joanna Quinn
- J. G. Quintel

== R ==
- Robert James Rallison
- Arthur Rankin, Jr.
- Rajiv Chilaka
- Chris Reccardi
- Adam Reed
- Mike Reiss
- Lotte Reiniger
- Wolfgang Reitherman
- William Reiss
- Rob Renzetti
- Émile Reynaud
- Richard Rich
- Rintaro
- Olan Rogers
- Justin Roiland
- Phil Roman
- Sue Rose
- Virgil Ross
- Rosto
- Tom Ruegger
- Herbert "Herbie" Ryman

== S ==
- Yoshiyuki Sadamoto
- Kiyoshi Sakai
- Masayuki Sakoi
- Hiroaki Sakurai
- Carlos Saldanha
- Chris Sanders
- Chris Savino
- Hiroshi Sasagawa
- Mutsumi Sasaki
- Rod Scribner
- Fred Seibert
- Henry Selick
- Mitsuyo Seo
- Ben Sharpsteen
- Gordon A. Sheehan
- Chris Shepherd
- Tsutomu Shibayama
- Domee Shi
- Ōten Shimokawa
- Rin Shin
- Makoto Shinkai
- Norio Shioyama
- Masamune Shirow
- David Silverman
- Sindhuja Rajaraman
- Marek Skrobecki
- Mike Scully
- Alvy Ray Smith
- Bruce W. Smith
- Jim Smith
- Peter Sohn
- Manick Sorcar
- Alison Snowden
- Irven Spence
- Michael Sporn
- Aaron Springer
- David Sproxton
- Vernon Stallings
- Andrew Stanton
- Ladislas Starevich
- Richard Starzak
- Jason Steele
- Matt Stone
- Eiji Suganuma
- Rebecca Sugar
- Pat Sullivan
- Rosana Sullivan
- Sid Sutherland
- Akira Suzuki
- Jan Švankmajer
- Doug Sweetland
- Charles Swenson

== T ==
- Kevin Temmer
- Kazuko Tadano
- Kumiko Takahashi
- Motosuke Takahashi
- Rumiko Takahashi
- Isao Takahata
- Iwao Takamoto
- Yasuhiro Takeda
- LiQin Tan
- Atsuko Tanaka
- Genndy Tartakovsky
- Frank Tashlin
- Ryōsuke Tei
- Suzie Templeton
- Doug TenNapel
- Dana Terrace
- Macoto Tezuka
- Osamu Tezuka
- Frank Thomas
- Paul Tibbitt
- Bruce Timm
- Izumi Todo
- Tomokazu Tokoro
- Yoshiyuki Tomino
- Hisayuki Toriumi
- Alex Toth
- Jiří Trnka
- Kazuya Tsurumaki
- Daisuke Tsutsumi
- Natalie Turner
- Bill Tytla

== U ==
- Yasuyuki Ueda
- Lee Unkrich
- Satoshi Urushihara

== V ==
- Péter Vácz
- Amadee J. Van Beuren
- Vanitha Rangaraju
- Jan Van Rijsselberge
- Thurop Van Orman
- Jhonen Vasquez
- Lloyd Vaughan
- Edith Vernick
- Conrad Vernon
- Phil Vischer
- Will Vinton
- Dušan Vukotić

== W ==
- Joseph Wallace
- Vincent Waller
- Darren Walsh
- Wan brothers
- Tom Warburton
- Jay Ward
- Pendleton Ward
- Ben Washam
- Dave Wasson
- Akio Watanabe
- Hajime Watanabe
- Shinichirō Watanabe
- Chris Wedge
- Simon Wells
- John Weldon
- Mo Willems
- Alex Williams
- J. R. Williams
- Richard Williams
- Amy Winfrey
- Steven Woloshen
- Tyrus Wong

== Y ==
- Kimio Yabuki
- Kōji Yamamura
- Akihiko Yamashita
- Tetsuya Yanagisawa
- Akira Yasuda
- Michiyo Yasuda
- Yoshikazu Yasuhiko
- Hajime Yatate
- Hiromasa Yonebayashi
- Kenichi Yoshida
- Yasuhiro Yoshiura
- Masaaki Yuasa
- Nobuteru Yūki

== Z ==
- Rudy Zamora
- Noureddin Zarrinkelk
- Karel Zeman
