= Graham Johnson =

Graham Johnson may refer to:

- Graham Johnson (musician) (born 1950), British pianist and Lieder accompanist
- Graham Johnson (cricketer, born 1946), cricketer with Kent
- Graham Johnson (cricketer, born 1958), former English cricketer
- Graham Johnson (canoeist) (born 1943), Australian sprint canoeist
- Graham Johnson (author) (born 1968), British author and investigative journalist
- Graham Johnson (scientist) (born 1973), American medical illustrator

== See also ==
- Graham Johnston (disambiguation)
