= Hilligoss =

Hilligoss is a surname. Notable people with the surname include:

- Candace Hilligoss (born 1935), American actress
- Nick Hilligoss, Australian animator
