= XVIVO Scientific Animation =

American medical animation studio

XVIVO Scientific Animation (or XVIVO) is an American scientific and medical animation studio based in Hartford, Connecticut, United States. It was founded in 2001 by David Bolinsky, former lead medical illustrator at Yale University, and Michael Astrachan. The company is most known for its short film The Inner Life of the Cell, which debuted at the 2006 SIGGRAPH conference in Boston. The project was commissioned by Harvard University's Department of Molecular and Cellular Biology, which currently holds the rights to the piece.

== The Inner Life of the Cell ==
In 2006, XVIVO released The Inner Life of the Cell, an 8.5 minute 3D computer graphics animation depicting the molecular processes of a white blood cell during leukocyte extravasation. The concepts and scientific knowledge for the film were given by Robert Lue, director of life sciences education, and Alain Viel, director of undergraduate research at Harvard University. The film was commissioned by Robert Lue to become part of the molecular and cellular biology department's learning program, Bio Visions. XVIVO's John Liebler was the lead animator for the project. The film took 14 months to complete.

The film has been noted for its cinematic take on science education, and has been described as "the pivotal moment for molecular animation." In an interview with Bolinsky, he admitted "we didn't really anticipate that it would go anywhere and when it did it took us all by surprise." In 2007, Bolinsky delivered a TED talk on the merits of scientific visualization, and showcased an excerpt from Inner Life. The New York Times covered the animation in a 2014 article, calling it "gorgeous" and saying "nothing quite like it had ever been made before", "it proved to be a huge hit, broadcast by museums, universities and television programs around the world."

Inner Life is the first in a proposed series of shorts for Harvard's BioVisions. The second installment, titled Powering the Cell: Mitochondria, was released in 2010 and depicts the process of cellular respiration. The third piece, titled Protein Packing, was released in 2014 and depicts the molecular crowding and Brownian motion of proteins within a neuron.

== The Vaccine Makers Project ==
In 2020, XVIVO partnered with the Children's Hospital of Philadelphia and Medical History Pictures on a classroom-based program known as the Vaccine Makers Project. As part of the program, XVIVO produced two videos that bring to life the detailed processes of how the human immune system fights diseases at both the cellular and molecular levels with the help of vaccinations. The animations also explain specifically how COVID-19 vaccines work to prevent the disease.

The Vaccine Makers Project animation, How COVID-19 mRNA Vaccines Work, won Best Experimental/Animation Film at the 2022 Scinema festival. was selected by the Academy of Interactive and Visual Arts to be recognized as a Communicator Award winner in the Use of Animation category and won a CADC-Connecticut Art Directors Club Silver award in the miscellaneous video category.

The Philadelphia Inquirer described the animation as "so clear. Very vivid. The explanation is excellent."

== 2021 Innovator of the Month by Senator Chris Murphy ==
U.S. Senator Chris Murphy named XVIVO "Innovator of the Month" in December 2021, saying "We've been wrangling with misinformation for a while—and especially throughout the COVID-19 pandemic. One of the best ways we can counter it is with clear, accessible information. XVIVO takes complicated scientific processes—like how the COVID-19 vaccine works—and turns them into easy-to-understand animations. I'm proud to recognize their innovative work, especially in addressing vaccine hesitancy".

== Wired Magazine feature ==
XVIVO was featured in the May 2013 issue of Wired (magazine) with an interview from XVIVO president and founder, Michael Astrachan. In it, he discusses how XVIVO brings biology to life through high-quality visualizations, stating "Scientists often have complex stories to tell, and we help them to simplify these through animation and images."

== Alleged copyright infringement by Premise Media ==
In 2008, XVIVO issued a cease-and-desist letter to the chairman of Premise Media Corporation, Logan Craft, for alleged copyright infringement in the upcoming film Expelled: No Intelligence Allowed. Resource DVDs issued for pre-release promotion displayed several animation sequences that were similar to those from Inner Life. The letter demanded that Premise Media surrender all copies of Inner Life and remove any infringed sequence before movie release.

Premise Media denied infringement and later filed its own lawsuit in the District Court for the Northern District of Texas. Premise claimed that the pre-release footage was different from the final film, and any inspiration drawn from Inner Life constituted fair use due to XVIVO's choice to make it freely available on the internet. The lawsuits ended with both parties agreeing to dismiss the case.
