= Robert Lue =

American researcher and academic (1964–2020)

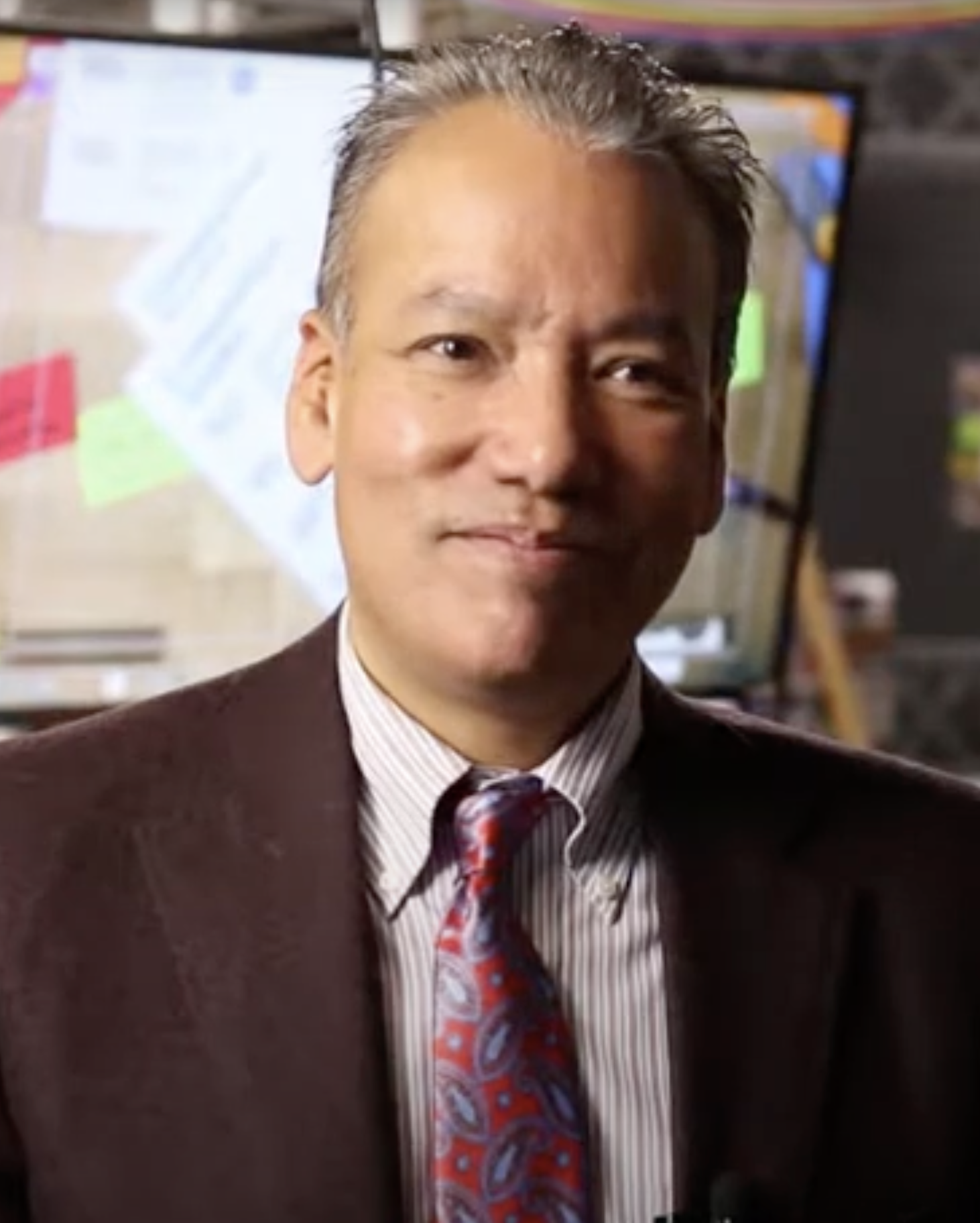
- Lue in 2019
- Born: May 23, 1964; Jamaica
- Died: November 11, 2020 (aged 56); Cambridge, Massachusetts, U.S.
- Education: College of the Holy Cross (BA); Harvard University (PhD)
- Known for: The Inner Life of the Cell (2006)
- Partner: Alain Viel (1990–)
- Scientific career
- Fields: Cellular biology
- Workplaces: Harvard University
- Thesis: Molecular and Biochemical Characterization of Hdlg (1995)
- Doctoral advisor: Daniel Branton

Robert Arnold Lue (May 23, 1964 – November 11, 2020) was a Jamaican-born American cellular biologist. He was the UNESCO Chair Professor on Life Sciences and Social Innovation at Harvard University, where he was the Richard L. Menschel Faculty Director of the Derek Bok Center for Teaching and a professor of molecular and cellular biology. Lue had been co-editor of the Harvard Data Science Review. Lue led LabXChange, an online learning platform, in partnership with the Amgen Foundation.

== Early life and education ==
Lue grew up in Jamaica, where he developed an interest in nature. He was of Chinese and Romanian descent. After being educated at St. George's College and graduating in 1980, Lue initially intended to study science at the University of Oxford before he "fell in love with the idea of the liberal arts" and instead chose to attend the College of the Holy Cross in Worcester, Massachusetts, on a full scholarship.

As an undergraduate, Lue specialized in philosophy, science, and studio arts. He graduated from Holy Cross with a Bachelor of Arts in biology and philosophy in 1986. After graduation, he considered pursuing either a doctorate in science, a doctorate in philosophy, or obtaining a Master of Fine Arts, ultimately deciding to spend a year painting and researching at Brandeis University.

In 1995, Lue earned his Ph.D. in cellular biology from Harvard University in 1995. His doctoral dissertation was titled "Molecular and biochemical characterization of Hdlg: the human homologue of the Drosophila discs-large tumor suppressor protein." In 1996, Lue completed his postdoctoral studies at Harvard. He was mentored by Daniel Branton, a professor of biology.

== Career ==
Lue joined the faculty of molecular and cellular biology at Harvard in 1999. Beginning in 2008, Lue was the Faculty Director of the Harvard-Allston Education Portal. He was recognized for his contributions to molecular animation. Lue's research was supported by the Howard Hughes Medical Institute. He served as dean of Harvard Summer School and co-authored two textbooks on biology, researching science visualization.

On March 1, 2013, Lue became the inaugural Richard L. Menschel Faculty Director of the Derek Bok Center for Teaching and Learning at Harvard University. He was formerly professor of the practice of molecular and cellular biology, and the director of life sciences education at Harvard University.

Lue developed multiple award-winning media animations about science, including Understanding HIV and AIDS (1999), Biochemistry: Interactive Learning (2000), The Inner Life of the Cell (2006), and Powering the Cell: Mitochondria (2010).

== Personal life ==
Lue died on November 11, 2020, of cancer at the age of 56. He was survived by his husband, Alain Viel.

== Selected publications ==
- Lue, Robert A. (2019-11-01). "Data Science as a Foundation for Inclusive Learning". Harvard Data Science Review. 1 (2). doi:10.1162/99608f92.c9267215. ISSN 2644-2353.
