= Graham Johnston =

Graham Johnston may refer to:

- Graham Johnston (swimmer) (1930–2019), South African swimmer
- Graeme Johnston (born 1942), former Australian rules footballer
- Graeme Johnstone (1945–2012), state coroner of Victoria, Australia, 1994–2007

== See also ==
- Graham Johnson (disambiguation)
