= Janet Iwasa =

Molecular animator

Janet Iwasa is an American data visualization expert and associate professor of biochemistry at the University of Utah.

== Early life and education ==
In 1978, Janet Iwasa was born to parents Mikeko and Kuni Iwasa in Bloomington, Indiana. She was the youngest of three children. Following her father joining the National Institutes of Health, she moved, with her family, to Maryland. She later went on to participate in an internship at the Institute for Genomic Research.

In 1999, she graduated with great honor from Williams College with bachelor's degrees in Biology and Asian Studies. In her junior year at Williams, she worked alongside Professor Robert Savage, studying the formation of segmented patterns in leeches on a cellular level. In 2006, Iwasa obtained a PhD in cell biology at the University of California in San Francisco. She wrote her doctoral thesis on the topic of actin networks.

After watching a molecular animation by Graham Johnson, she began to pursue 3D animation. She began taking animation classes at San Francisco State University. After graduation, she studied animation at the Gnomon School of Visual Effects in Hollywood, California; she was the only woman in her class. She applied her skills in animation to biology, using 3D animation as a means to visualize cellular functions and interactions.

== Career and research ==
In 2006, Iwasa began working as a postdoctoral fellow under Jack Szostak with Harvard University and the Massachusetts General Hospital. In 2007, Iwasa worked as a teaching assistant at Harvard Medical School, in the "Visualizing Molecular Processes with Maya" course. She also worked with MASSIVE, adapting the visual effects software to depict processes of nucleation elongation.

In 2008, Iwasa created illustrations and animations for a multimedia exhibit for the Boston Museum of Science titled Exploring Life's Origins.

In 2008, she became a lecturer in Molecular Visualization for the Department of Cell Biology at Harvard Medical School. Her work with Joan Brugge and Michael Overholtzer furthered her understanding of a newly discovered cellular process called endosis. Iwasa worked alongside researchers at the university to investigate the process.

While working with Tomas Kirchausen, she created an animation on clathrin-mediated endocytosis, researching how clathrin triskelions operated and assembled on the inner surface of the plasma membrane to invaginate an extracellular particle.

In 2010, Iwasa organized and taught a course on visualizing molecular and cellular processes with 3D animation in Porto, Portugal. In 2013, she joined the University of Utah School of Medicine as a research assistant professor for the Department of Cell Biology. She returned to Portugal in 2014 to teach a 3D animation workshop for scientific animation. In 2014, she also completed a project called Molecular Flipbook, a free, open-source software program designed to animate molecules. In 2016, Iwasa released a life-cycle animation on HIV. Her project used animation to illustrate the molecular mechanisms the virus utilizes to enter into and exit target cells..

In addition to teaching and her research, Iwasa directs the Animation Lab at the University of Utah. The lab focuses on developing high quality molecular and cellular animations that help scientists that communicate complex biological processes. Through collaboration with researchers, the lab creates visualizations of molecular mechanisms that are difficult to observe directly. this process helps improve scientific education and public understanding of cellular biology.

Iwasa is a TED senior fellow, and has spoken about animation in molecular biology at both TED and TEDx conferences. She has also contributed to TED-Ed.

=== Publications ===
Iwasa's work has been published in scientific journals including Nature, Science, and Cell, as well as the New York Times.

Iwasa's knowledge of cellular animation has also led her to publish several different works of scientific literature. Her work with Robert Savage's Lab led to her first publication in 1999 in Development Genes and Evolution, "The leech hunchback protein is expressed in the epithelium and CNS but not in the segmental precursor lineages", with co-authors Suver and Savage. Iwasa's work with Savage focused on identifying regulatory genes engaged in the formation of segment patterns in annelids, investigating a gene in leeches called Leech Zinc Finger II (LZF2), considered to be an orthologue of the hunchback (hb) gene in Drosophila. Iwasa, Savage, and Suver concluded that LZF2 likely plays an important part in the morphological progressions of gastrulation and the specification of the central nervous system in leeches but does not contribute to the formation of anteroposterior patterns.

In 2007, she published an article on her research at the University of California with Mullins, "Spatial and temporal relationships between actin-filament nucleation, capping, and disassembly." Her study with Mullins focused on the lamellipodial network. They concluded that the lamellipodial network incorporates the Arp 2/3 complex and capping proteins during initial assembly, but dismisses these complexes long before the lamellipodial network is actually disassembled. They also reported that the network does not use cofilin, twinfilin, and tropomyosin in assembly. Instead, these factors play a role in the network's size.

In 2010, she published "Animating the model figure" in Trends in Cell Biology. In this article, she points out the importance of animations in revealing and teaching scientific concepts, explaining that students are shown to retain more information and show more interest in the material when animations are incorporated into the curriculum. She also pushed the invention of animation software engineered exclusively for the scientific research community.

In 2015, Iwasa and Wallace Marshal co-authored Karp's Cell and Molecular Biology: Concepts and Experiments by Gerald Karp.

In 2016, Iwasa published "The Scientist as Illustrator" in Trends in Immunology, in which she describes the role of animation in science and discusses the importance of visualization.

== Recognition and honors ==
From 1999 to 2004, Iwasa was honoured as a member of the NSF Graduate Fellowship. From 2006 to 2008, she was a member of the NSF Discpery Corps Postgraduate Fellowship. In 2008, she earned an honourable mention for her entry into the AAAS International Science & Engineering Visualization Challenge. In 2012, she was listed as one of Fast Company's "100 Most Creative People." In 2014, she was recognized as a TED Fellow, a FASEB BioArt Winner, and one of Foreign Policy Magazine's "100 Leading Global Thinkers." In 2016, the University of Utah credited Iwasa as an Entrepreneurial Faculty Scholar. In 2017, she was honoured as a TED Senior Fellow.

Iwasa has also played an important role in promoting the use of scientific visualization in education. Through workshops, lectures, and online educational platforms, she has encouraged scientists and students to use animation as a tool to better explain biological processes. Her work highlights how visual storytelling can make complex molecular mechanisms more accessible to both researchers and the public.

In 2012, Iwasa was ranked 25th in the "100 most creative people" by FastCompany.
