= The Inner Life of the Cell =

2006 film

- A screenshot from the video, depicting a motor protein moving a vesicle by crawling along a microtubule.

The Inner Life of the Cell is an 8.5-minute 3D computer graphics animation demonstrating the molecular mechanisms that occur when a white blood cell in the blood vessels of the human body is activated by inflammation (Leukocyte extravasation). It shows how a white blood cell rolls along the inner surface of the capillary, flattens out, and squeezes through the cells of the capillary wall to the site of inflammation where it contributes to the immune reaction.

== Production ==
David Bolinsky, former lead medical illustrator at Yale, lead animator John Liebler, and Mike Astrachan are some of the creators at XVIVO who made the movie. The audio track was composed, recorded, and produced by Matt Berky. They created the animation for Harvard's Department of Molecular and Cellular Biology.

Most of the processes animated were the result of Alain Viel and Robert Lue's work describing the processes to the team. Alain Viel is an associate director of undergraduate research at Harvard University.

The film took 14 months to create for 8.5 minutes of animation. It was first seen by a wide audience at the 2006 SIGGRAPH conference in Boston.
