= Alain Viel =

French-born American biologist

- Born: France
- Education: Pierre and Marie Curie University (PhD)
- Known for: The Inner Life of the Cell
- Partner: Robert Lue (d. 2020)
- Scientific career
- Fields: Biochemistry, biology
- Workplaces: Harvard University
- Doctoral advisor: Marc le Maire; Daniel Branton

Alain Viel is the director of Northwest Undergraduate Laboratories and senior lecturer in the Department of Molecular and Cellular Biology at Harvard University.

== Early life and education ==
Viel received a PhD in molecular and cellular biology of development in 1990 from Pierre and Marie Curie University in Paris, France (Paris VI) for a thesis "Les particules ribonucleoproteiques dans le oocytes de xenopus laevis. mise en place du systeme de synthese proteique" and did postdoctoral work at Harvard University.

== Academic career ==
His main research has been on tumor suppressor hDlg which includes an in-depth characterization of the combinations of hDlg isoforms present in multiple tissues and cell lines to correlate the presence of specific alternatively spliced insertions with a specific function of this tumor suppressor. He also studies the perturbation of hDlg distribution in two skin disease: psoriasis, characterized by a hyper-proliferation of basal cells, and Darier's disease, characterized by blisters resulting from the loss of cell adhesion in the supra-basal layers.

He is a founding member of BioVisions.

== Lectures ==
In 2015, Viel started to teach an online course MCB63X - Principles of Biochemistry with Rachelle Gaudet on edX.

== Publications ==
=== Books ===
Viel is a co-author of the book Biology: How Life Works. It is published by Macmillan Education and is the first project to develop three pillars: the text, the visual program, and the assessment at the same time.

=== Multimedia ===
Viel is co-author of The Inner Life of the Cell, an 8.5-minute 3D computer graphics animation illustrating the molecular mechanisms that occur when a white blood cell in the blood vessels of the human body is activated by inflammation (Leukocyte extravasation). It shows how a white blood cell rolls along the inner surface of the capillary, flattens out, and squeezes through the cells of the capillary wall to the site of inflammation where it contributes to the immune reaction.
