= Daniel Branton =

American cell biologist (born 1932)

Daniel Branton (born January 13, 1932) is an American cell biologist. He is the Higgins Professor of Biology, Emeritus at Harvard University. His research has played a key role in visualizing the composition of the cell membrane and later in the development of DNA nanopore sequencing.

Branton earned a Bachelor of Arts in mathematics at Cornell University, then moved to the University of California, Berkeley to pursue a PhD in plant physiology. He taught at UC–Berkeley until joining the Harvard University faculty in 1973, where he later held the Higgins Professorship of Biology. In 1985, Branton was president of the American Society for Cell Biology.

During his time at the University of California, Branton's research

He won a Guggenheim Fellowship in 1970, and was elected to membership within the American Academy of Arts and Sciences and the United States National Academy of Sciences in 1974 and 1981, respectively.
