= Graham Johnson (cricketer, born 1958) =

English cricketer

Personal information
- Full name: Graham Johnson
- Born: 1 May 1958 (age 68); Hetton-le-Hole, County Durham, England
- Batting: Left-handed
- Bowling: Right-arm fast-medium

Domestic team information
- Years: Team
- 1982–1987: Durham

Career statistics
Competition	List A
Matches	5
Runs scored	34
Batting average	17.00
100s/50s	–/–
Top score	20*
Balls bowled	312
Wickets	4
Bowling average	46.50
5 wickets in innings	–
10 wickets in match	–
Best bowling	2/35
Catches/stumpings	2/–
- Source: Cricinfo, 7 August 2011

Graham Johnson (born 1 May 1958) is a former English cricketer. Johnson was a left-handed batsman who bowled right-arm fast-medium. He was born in Hetton-le-Hole, County Durham.

Johnson made his debut for Durham against Cheshire in the 1982 Minor Counties Championship. He played Minor counties cricket for Durham from 1982 to 1987, making 18 Minor Counties Championship appearances and 7 MCCA Knockout Trophy appearances. He made his List A debut against Northamptonshire in the 1984 NatWest Trophy. He made 4 further List A appearances, the last of which came against Middlesex in the 1987 NatWest Trophy. In his 5 List A matches, he scored 34 runs at an average of 17.00, with a high score of 20 not out. With the ball, he took 4 wickets at a bowling average of 46.50, with best figures of 2/35.
