= LiQin Tan =

American artist (born 1957)

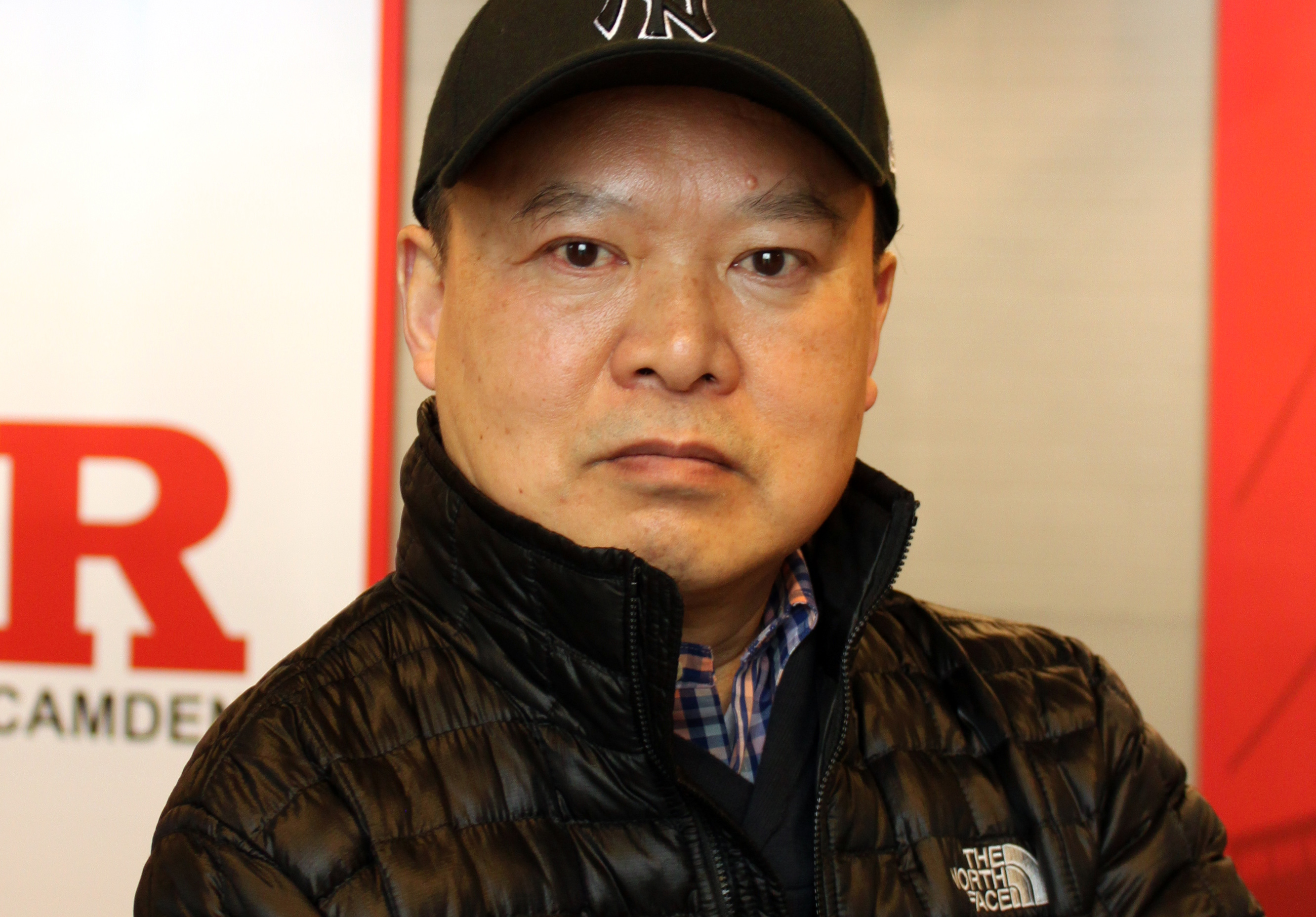
- Tan, at Rutgers University, 2018
- Born: 1957 (age 68–69)
- Education: Painting
- Known for: Singularity Art, Animation
- Movement: '85 Art Movement
- Website: www.tanimation.us

LiQin Tan (born 1957) is an American digital artist, animator, researcher and educator who has taught in Canada, China, Singapore and the United States.

== Biography ==
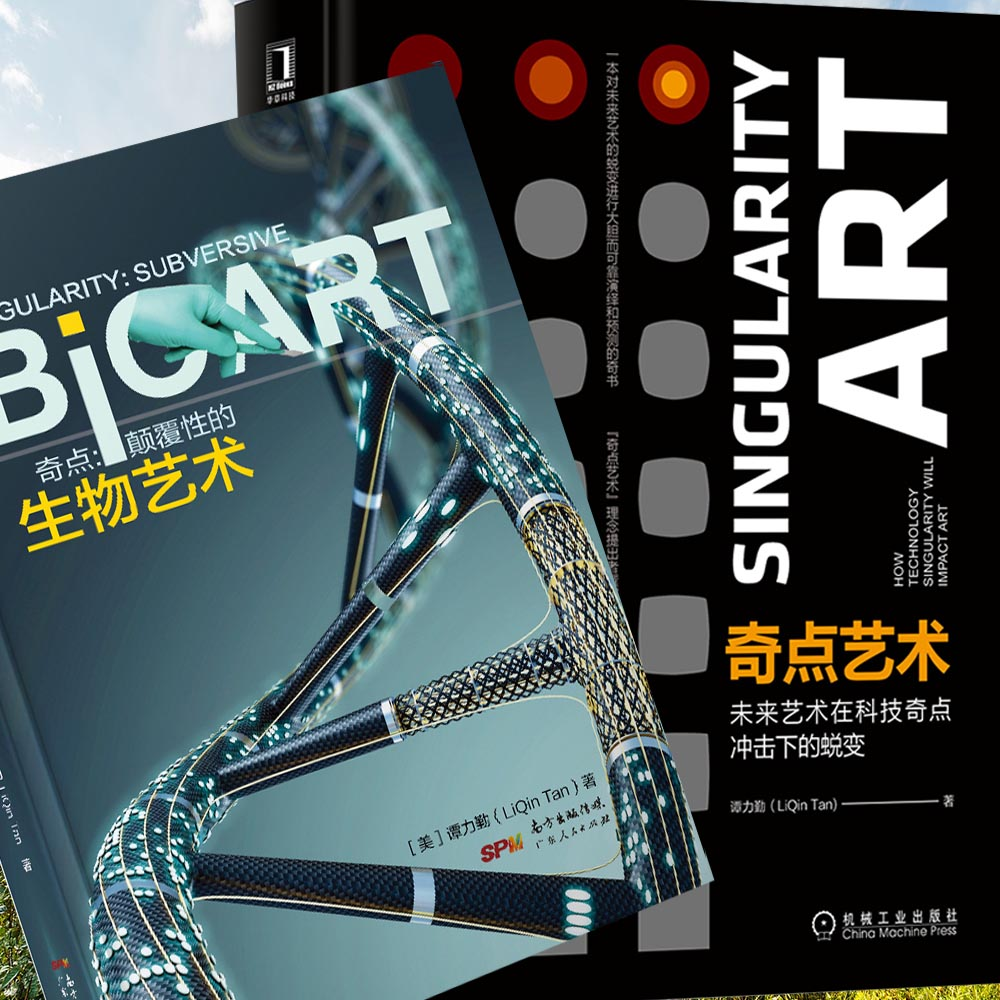

Tan is a full professor and co-director of art program at Rutgers University-Camden. He has served as a board member of the Digital Art Committee, SIGGRAPH and as a juror for the digital art gallery at SIGGRAPH. He was also one of the activists during the ’85 art trend of China. In addition, he has previously worked as an art director, animator, graphic designer and executive art editor in local and board industries. Since transferring to the field of digital art, he has pioneered the "Digital-Primitive” and “Digital Nature” concepts, which has won great acclaim and a number of awards from both American and international art scenes.

His artwork has been exhibited nationally and internationally in both solo and group shows. Such as SIGGRAPH (‘02-’07) in USA, Electronics Alive IV in USA, iDMAa04-08 in USA, the National Art Museum of China, Moscow Int’l Festival of Animation & Media Art, the Beijing World Art Museum, the Vancouver Art Galleryin Canada, the Shanghai DuoLun Museum of Modern Art, the National Centre for Computer Animation in UK, the Centre D’Art Contemporaine in Montreal Canada, the Singapore Art Museum, the LaSalle Univ. Art Museum in USA, the Noyes Museum of Art in USA, the Jiangsu Art Gallery, Beijing Song Zhuang Art Museum and the Guang Dong Art Museum, amongst others.,

Tan's art research since 2000 has focused mainly on the merging of conceptual animation, animation installation, interactive animation, and digital prints on rigid materials. His resulting work was awarded first place from the 5th Digital Art and Computer Animation Competition by the Beecher Center for Art and Technology, the "Best of Show" at iDEAa. He has also been awarded first place, as well as the excellence prize from the China Academy Awards., the Award of Excellence by the International Digital IV, the Award of Excellence at the Global Media Competition from gallery international etc.

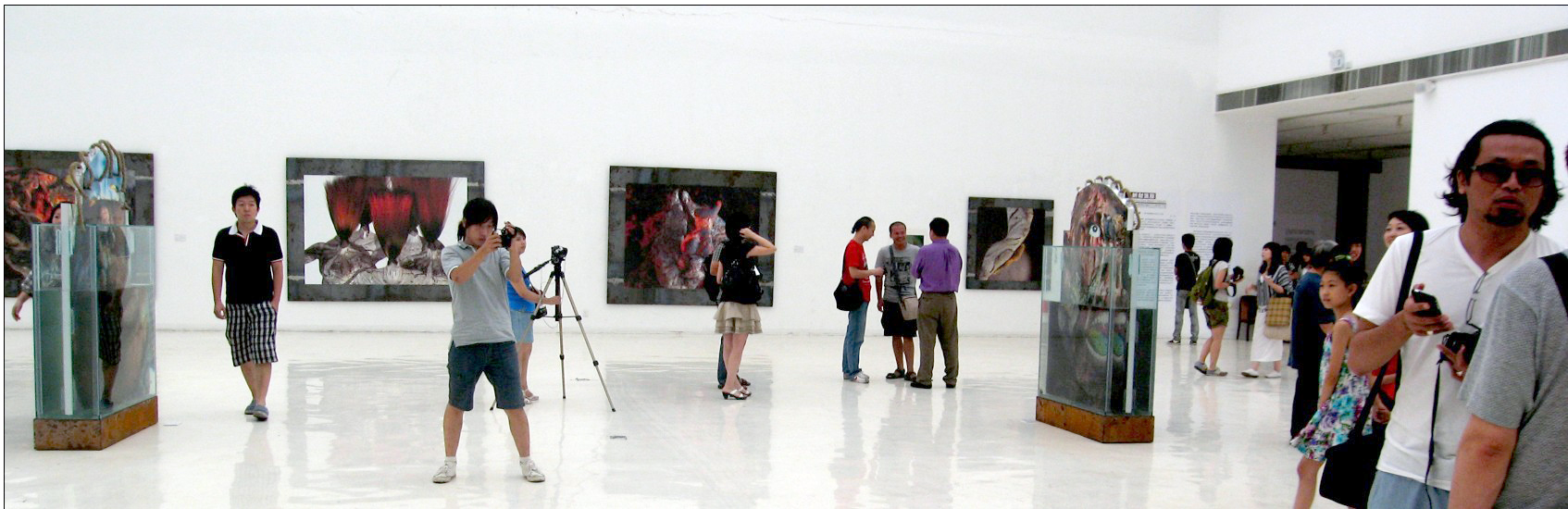
Solo Show at Song Zhuang Art Museum, (2010)

In recent years, he has concentrated on exploring the relationship between technological singularity and art, and how this interface will change the creative force and provide a blueprint for future art expansion, which has conducted experiments with major advances art form such as ai-art, interactive-art, bio-art, nano-art, vr-art, 4d-printing and any other new art procedures combined. His publications include a number of articles regarding technological singularity art, contemporary art, art criticism, art education, and animation. In addition to these articles are his books and catalogues, such as Singularity Art, Singularity: Subversive BioArt,Digital Natural Art, Digital Artwork Collection II, Character Animation & Rigging, and Tan On Art/Art On Tan. His in-progress books are: Singularity: Invisible Art.

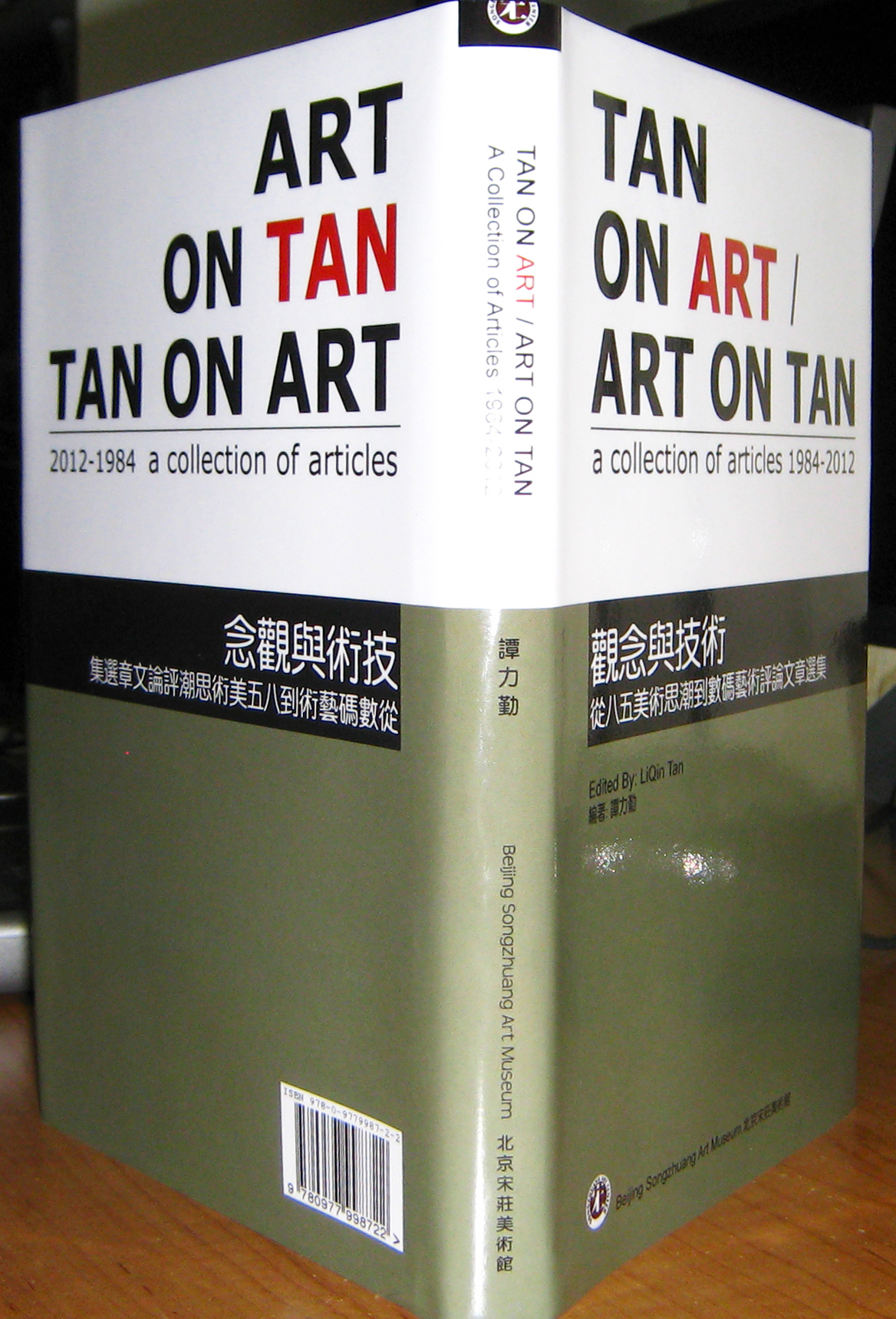
Tan On Art /Art On Tan--A collection of articles from 1984-2012

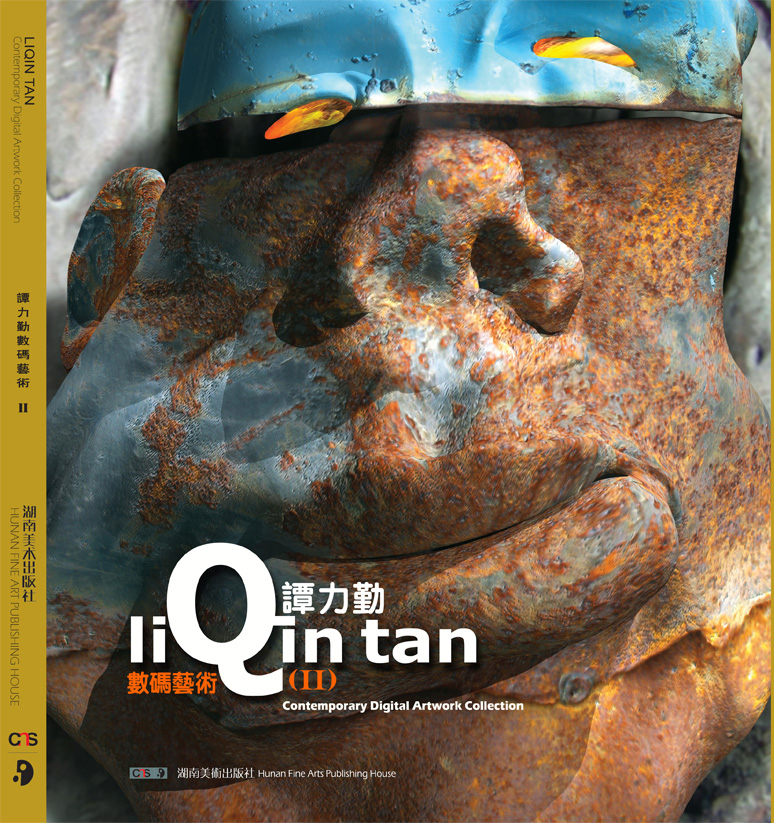
LiQin Tan: Contemporary Digital Artwork Collection, (2012)

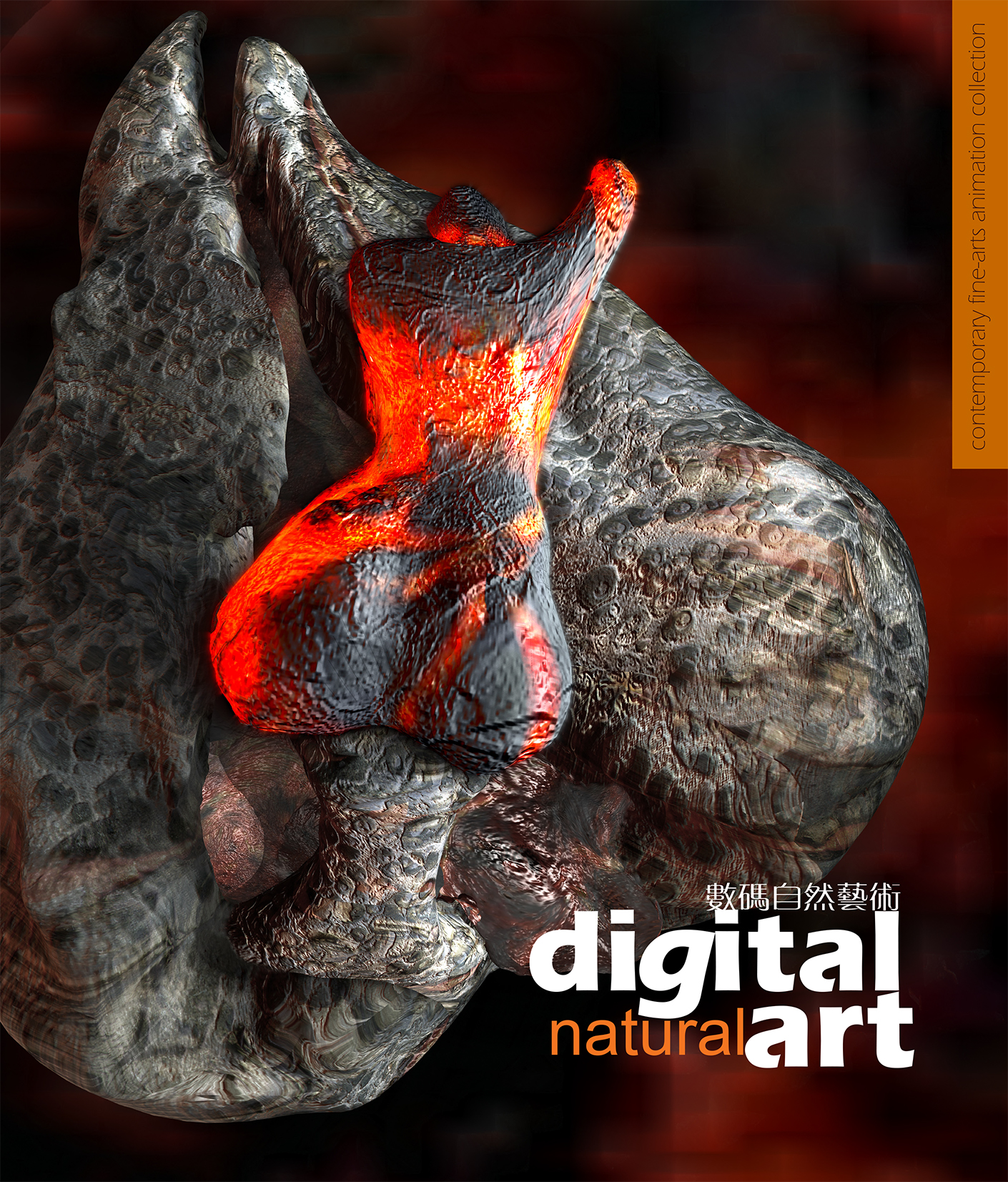
Digital Natural Art, (2006)

== Art Work ==
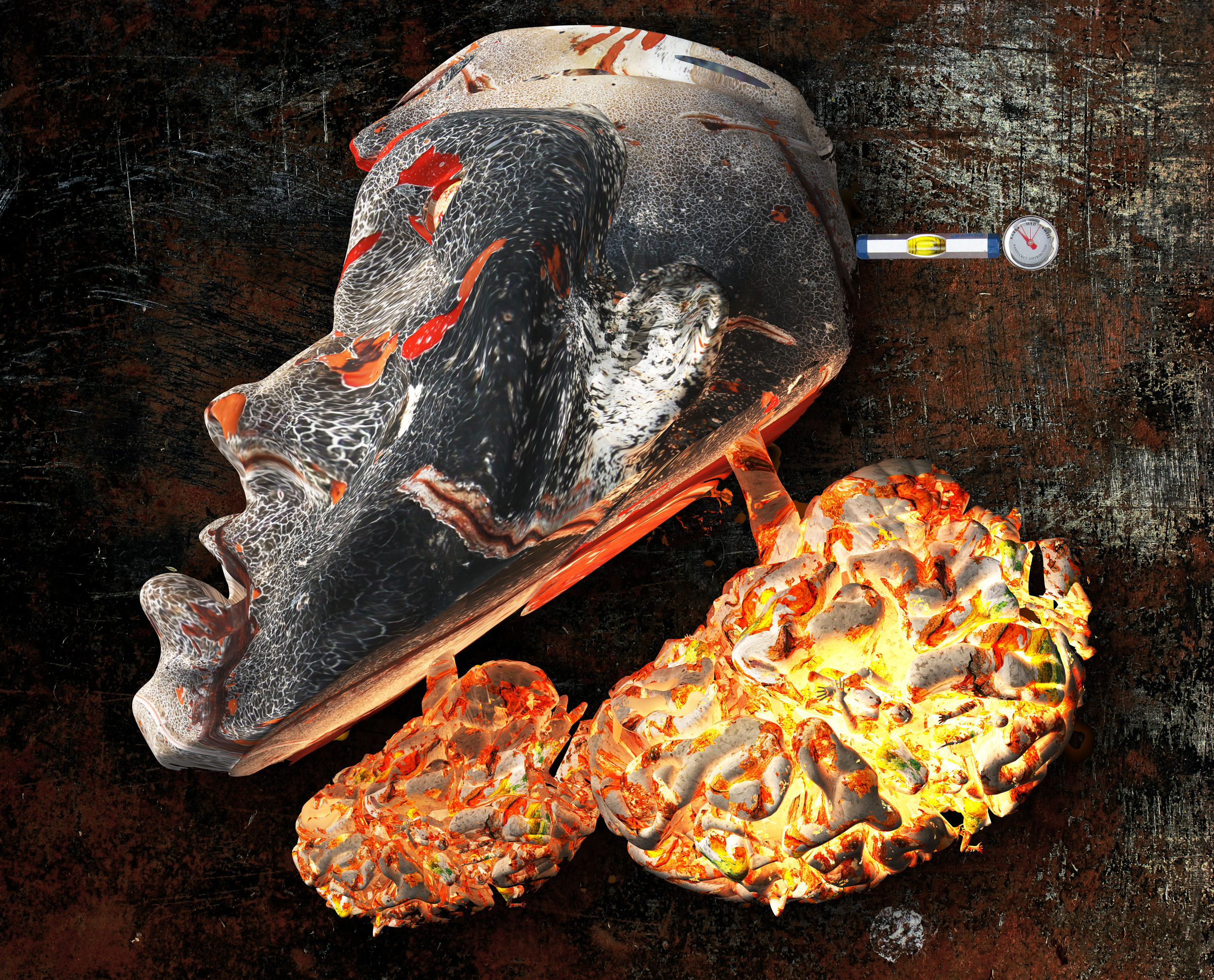
Skating Brain, Digital Metal Prints with Signal Devices, (2012)

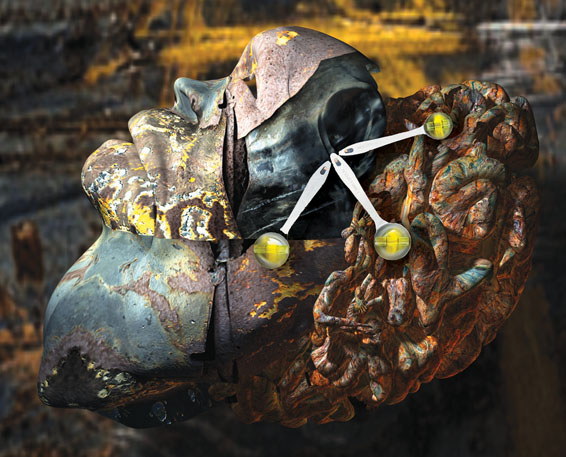
Level Carrie, Digital Metal prints w/ Signal Devices, (2012)

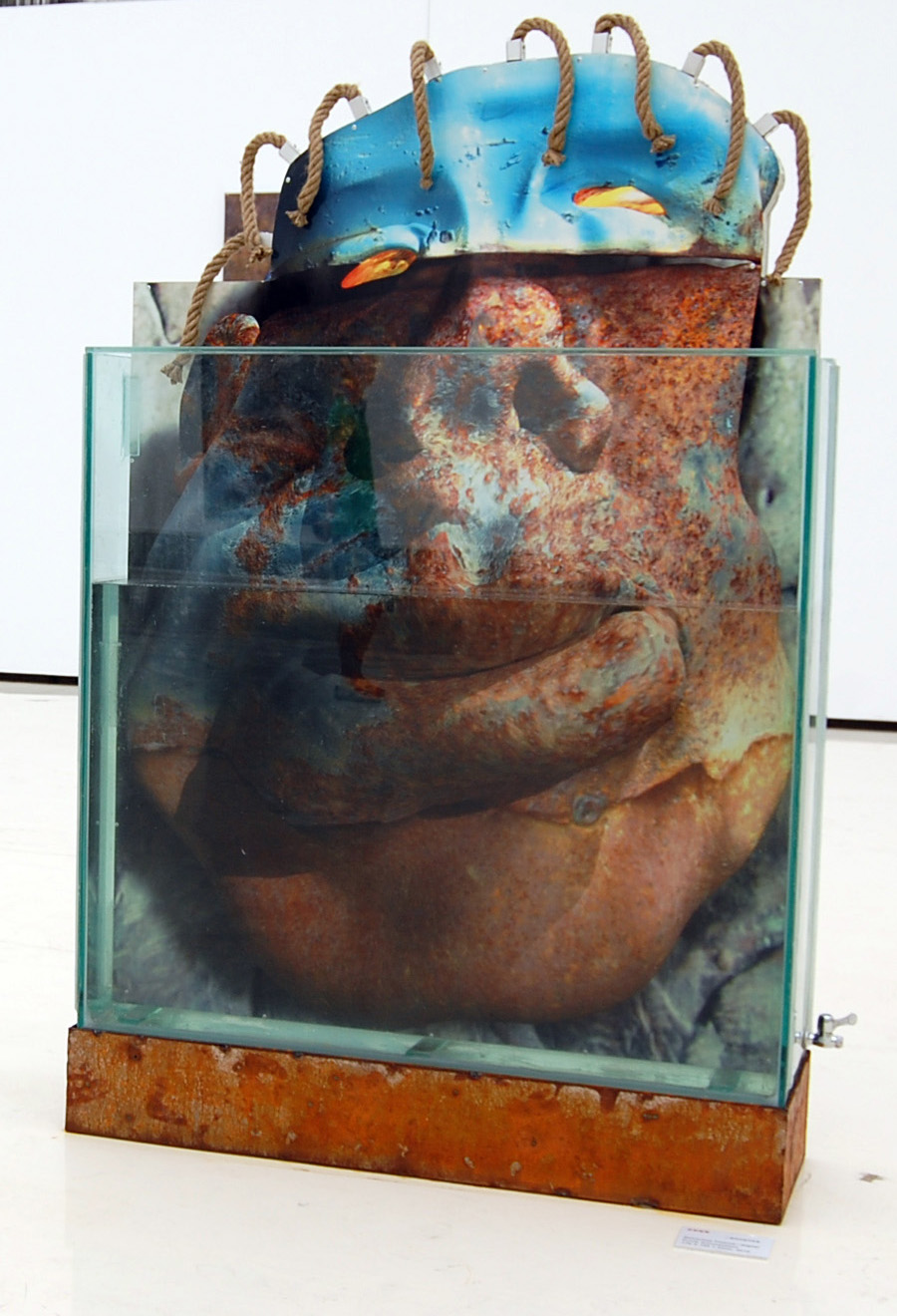
Refractive Fissure, Digital Metal prints w/ Water & Glass，(2010)，

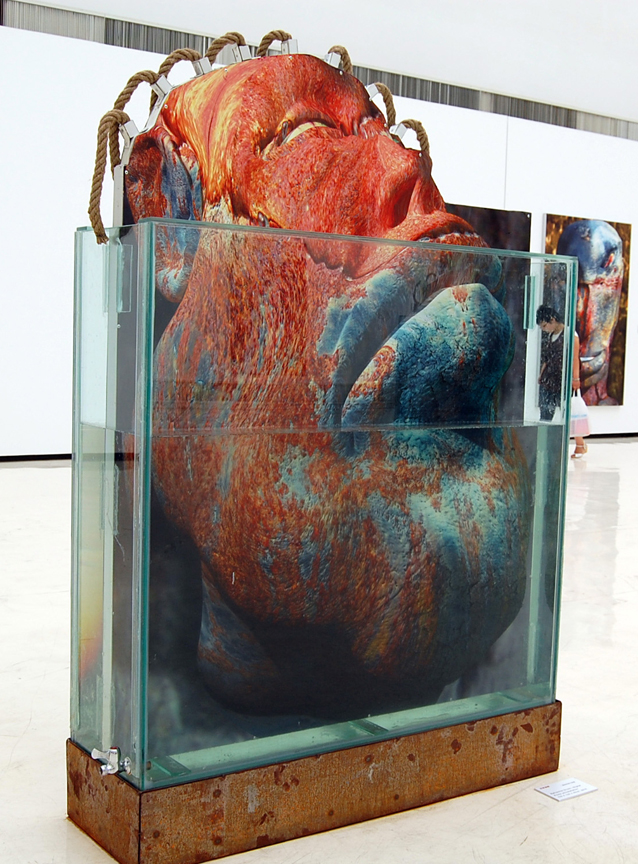
Refractive Dizziness, Digital Metal Prints w/ Water & Glasses, (2010)

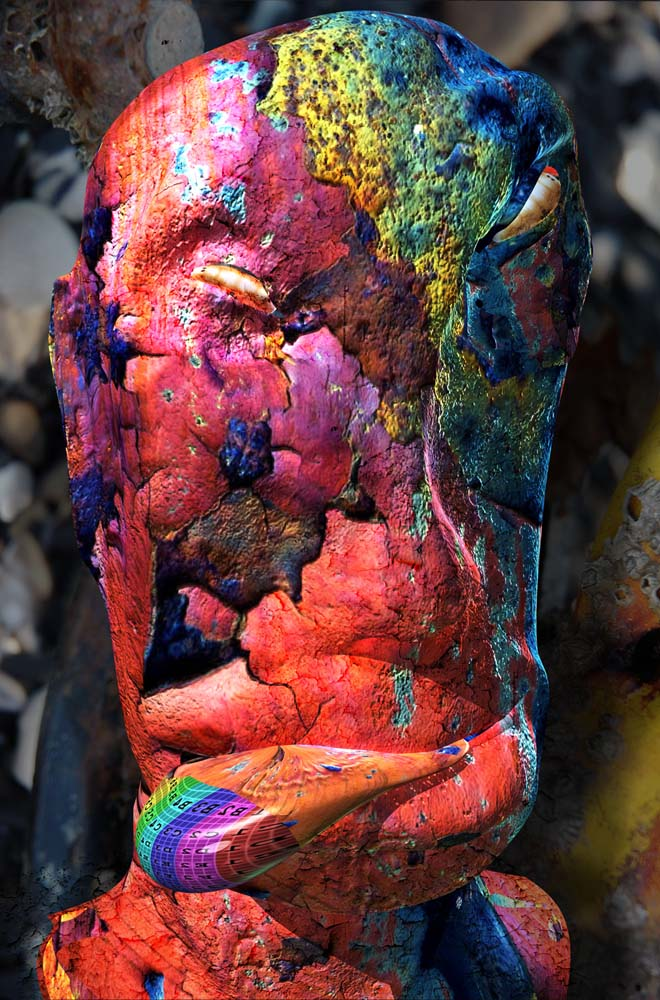
Rusty Hotness, Digital Metal Prints, (2010)

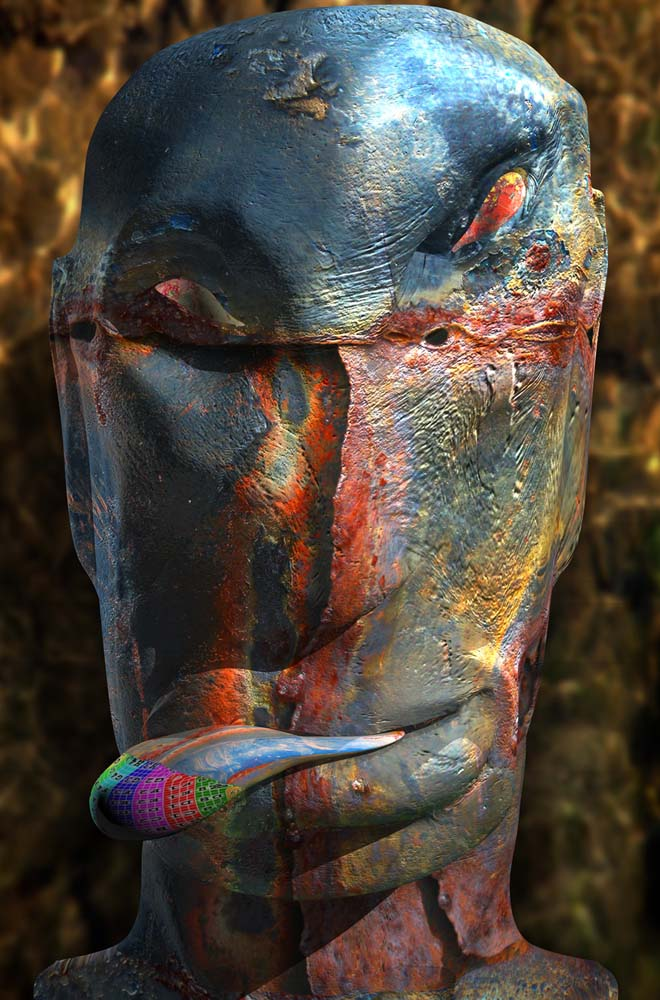
Rusty Obscureness, Didiral Metal Prints，(2010)

Primitive Level-Signals (2012) Digital Prints Installation w/ Signal Devices Applies spirit levels as a signal to describe a natural phenomenon in humans, where human brain development is an equalized procedure. The competing concepts of the brain—whether the battle of the brain's size versus its intellectual capacity, or of its technological versus its spiritual side—are always kept in equilibrium.

Refractive Brain Therapy Series (2010) Animation Installation w/ Digital Prints, Water & Glass

The project consists of a few large digital-brain prints on metal, which are placed into later, water-filled vats. This series shows a unique understanding of refractivity in both natural phenomena and social truth. These prints are placed alongside other animation installations and LCD monitors.

Agricultural Implements Series (2008) Interactive Animation w/ Agricultural Implements

This animation installation emphasizes “cultural-revelation” and “great-leap-forward” content, and the conflict between industrialization and agriculture. It does through ancient Chinese agricultural implements, such as a normal winnower, a middle-sized grindstone, and a Chinese scale.

Digitally Bloodless Series (2008) Installation in Kind w/ Digital Prints

This series explores the paradox of state that humans inhabit between primitive urges and technology through 3D modeled graphics that are then presented in 2D media.

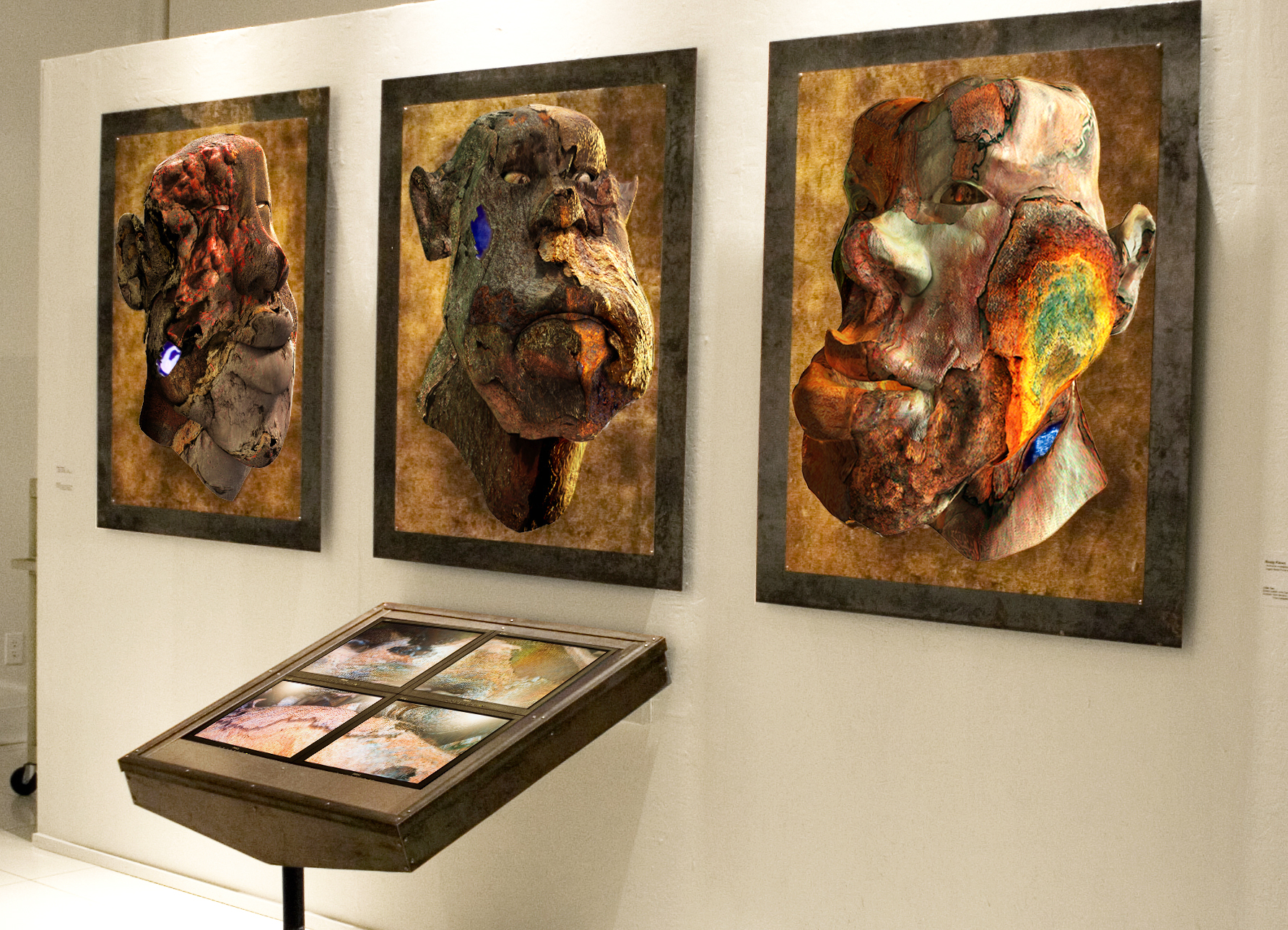
Rusty Faces, Animation Installation with Digital Metal Prints, (2006-2007)

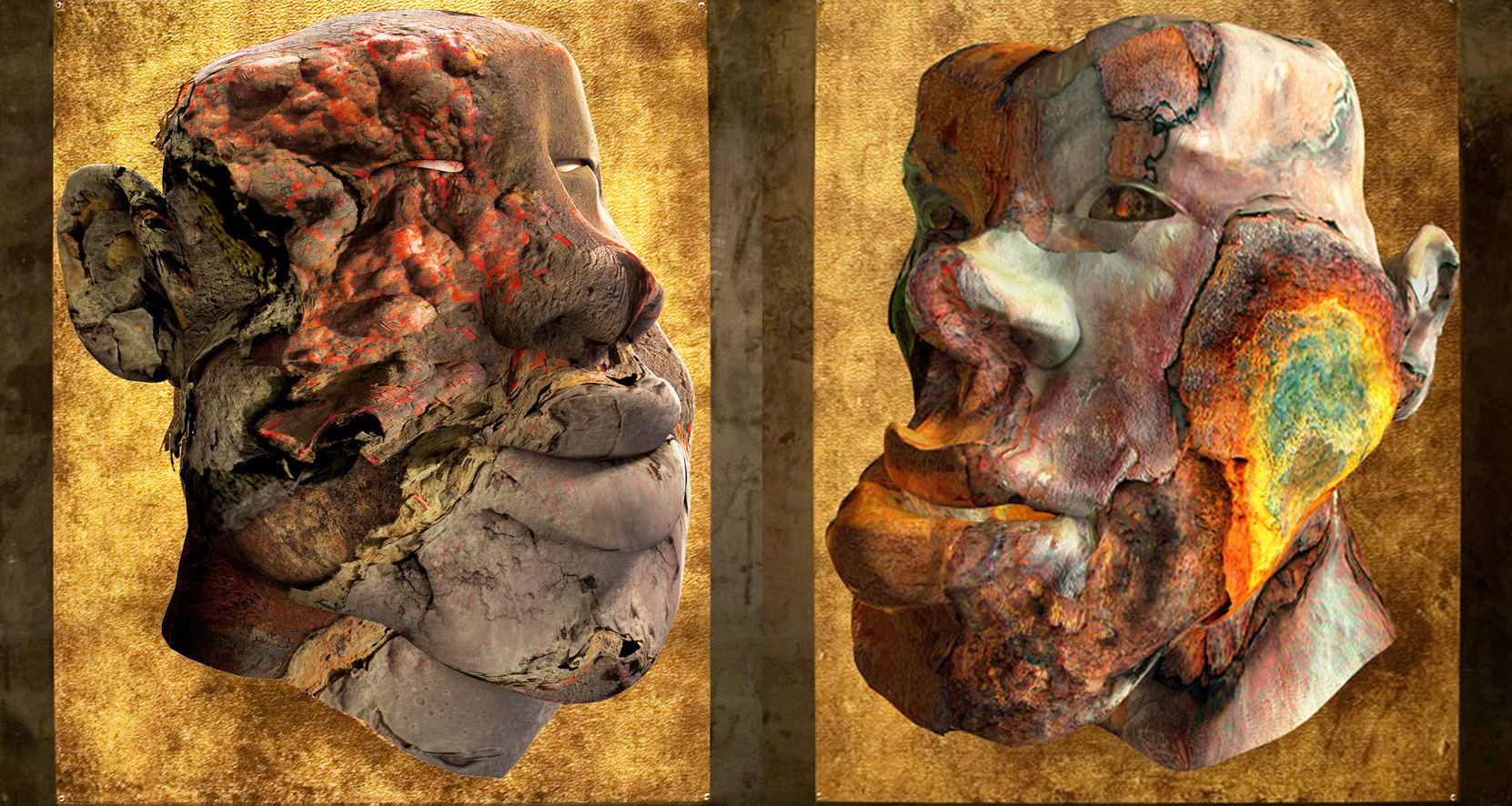
Rusty Faces, Animation Installation w/ Digital Metal prints, (2006)

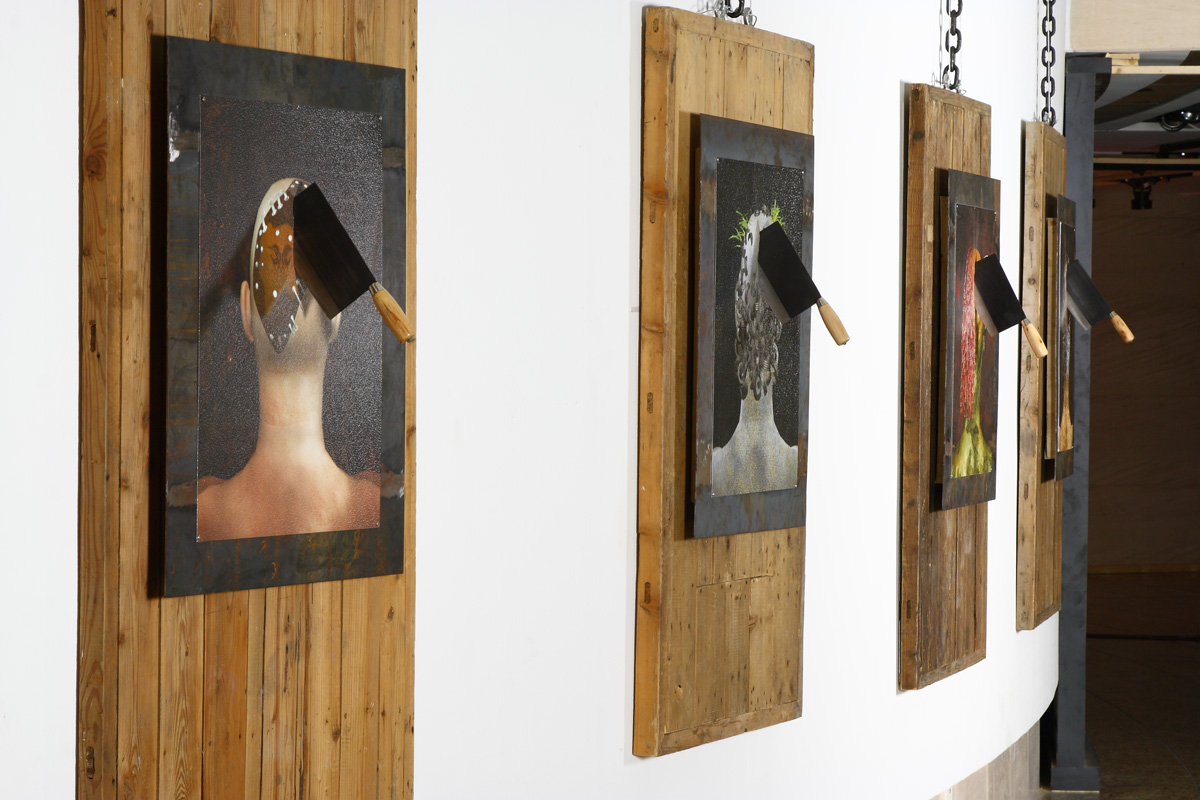
Digital Bloodless, Digital Prints Installation w/ Knives, (2008)

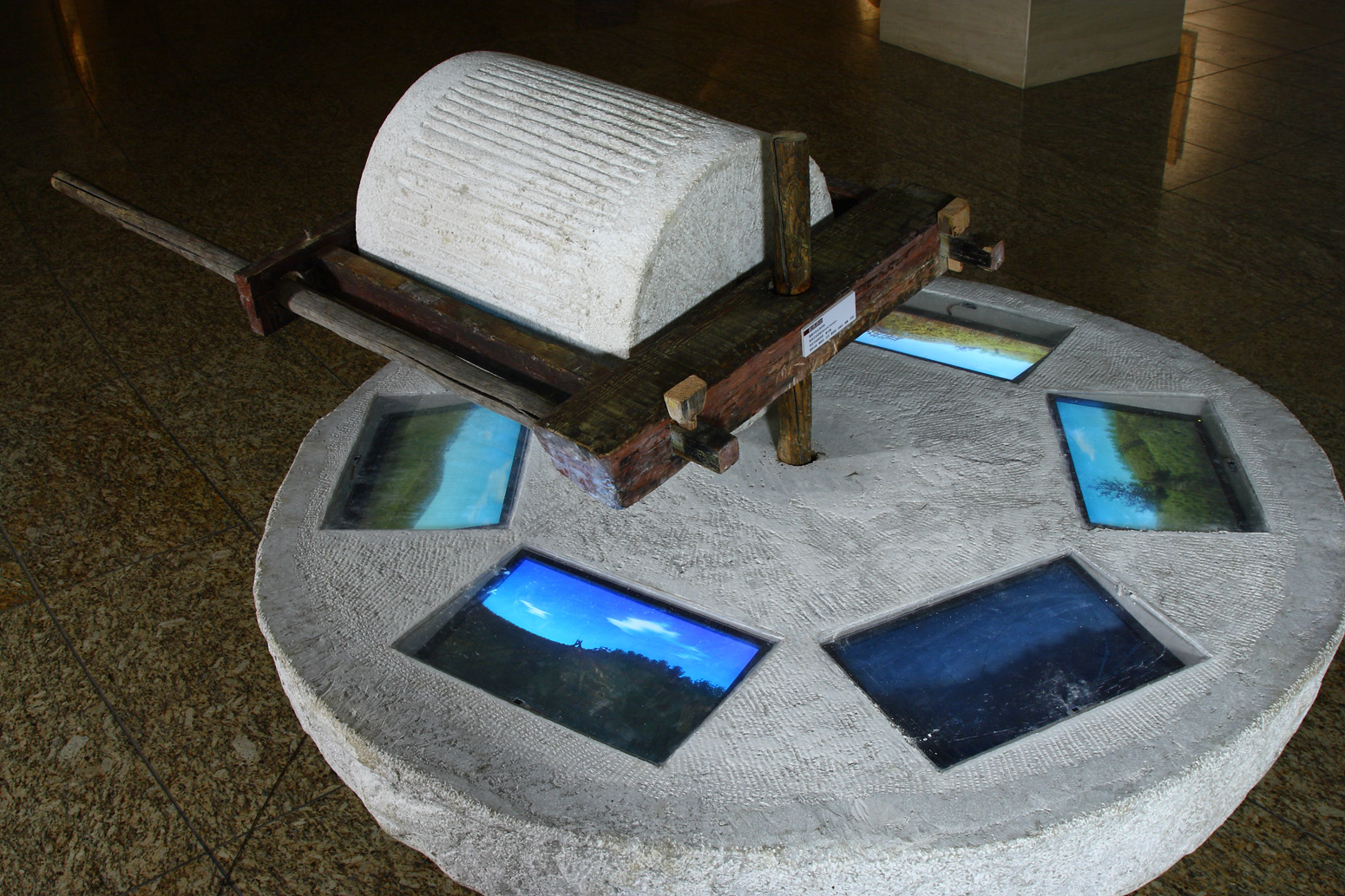
Grindstone, Interactive Animation Installation, 2008

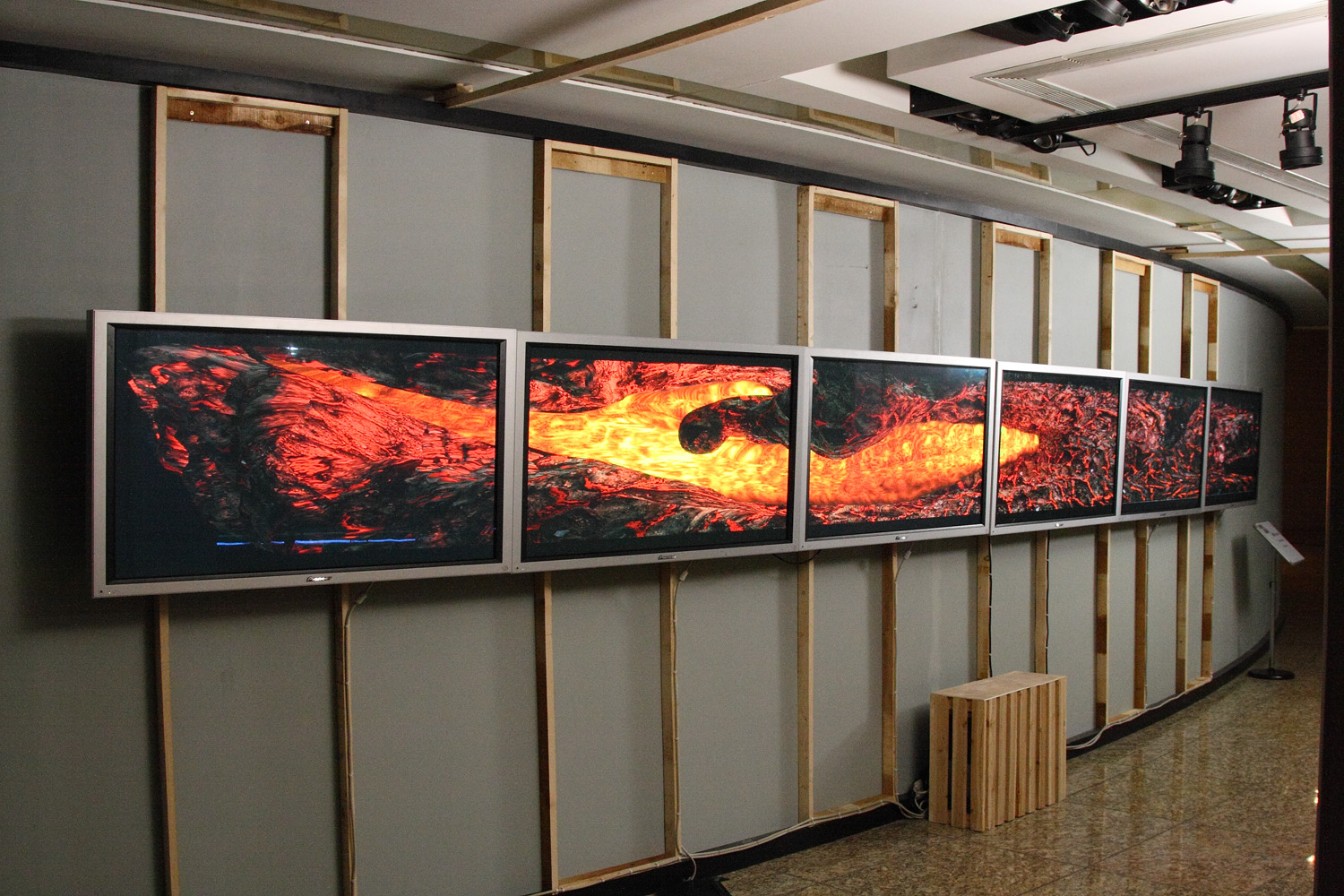
Lava + 6, Animation Installation, (2006–07)

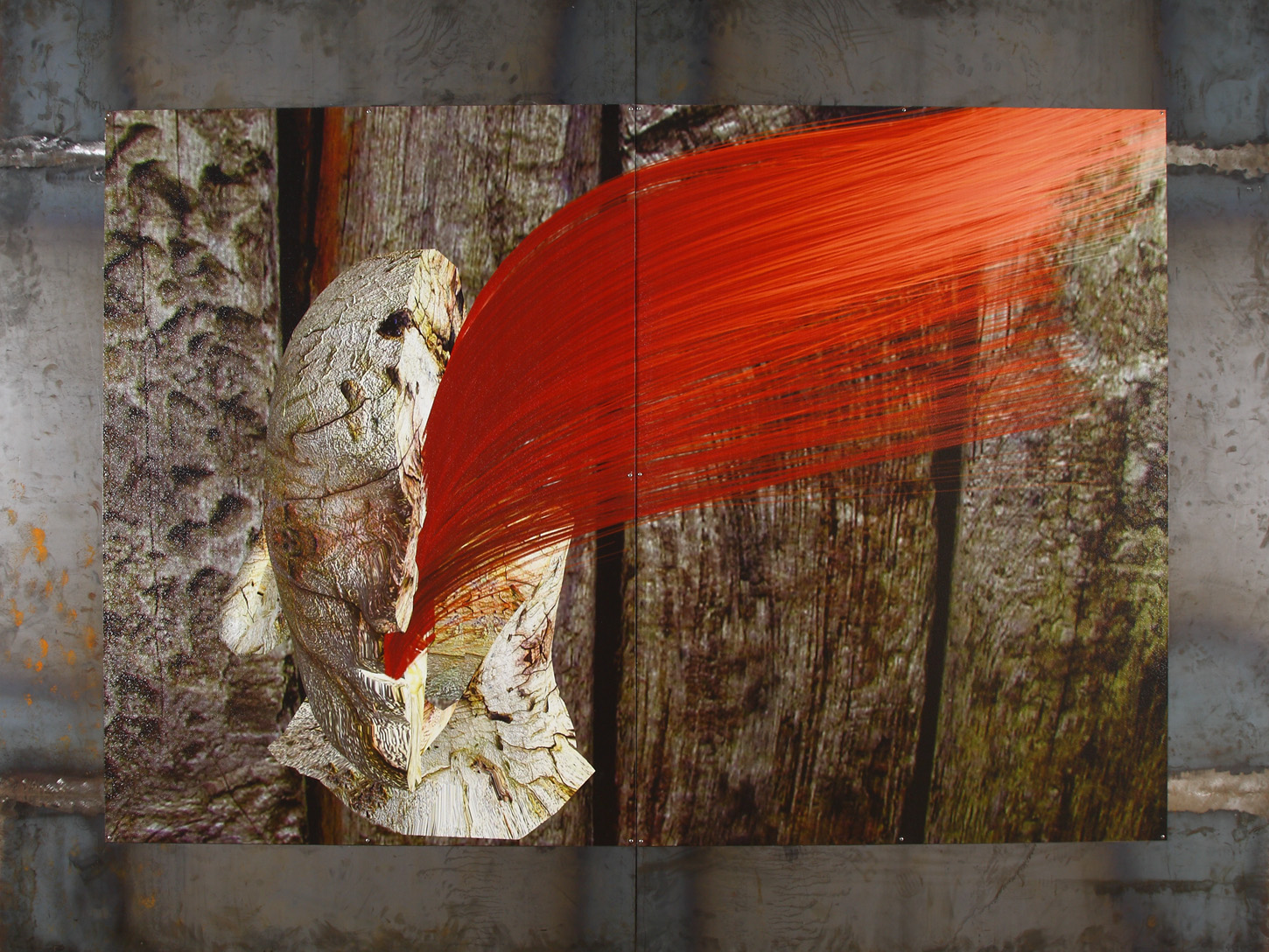
Burl Hair Red, Digital Metal Prints, 2005

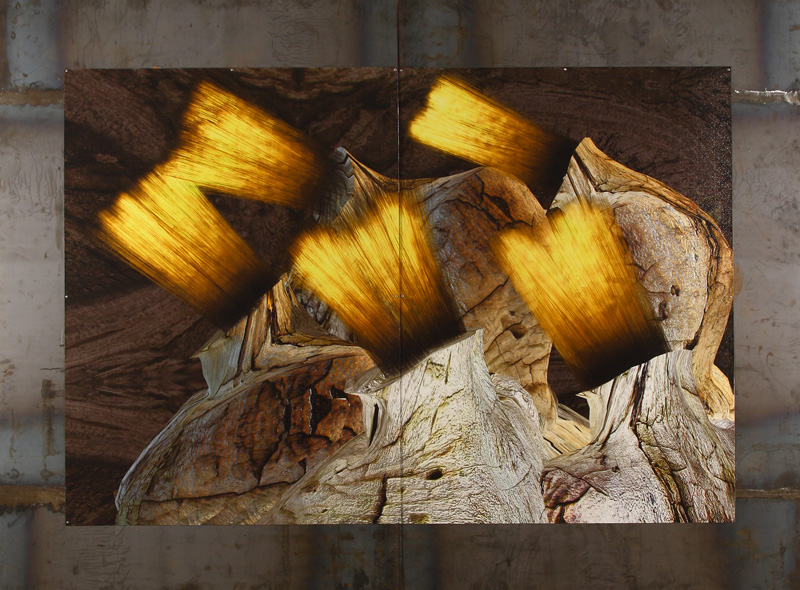
Burl-Hair Gold, Digital Metal Prints, (2005)

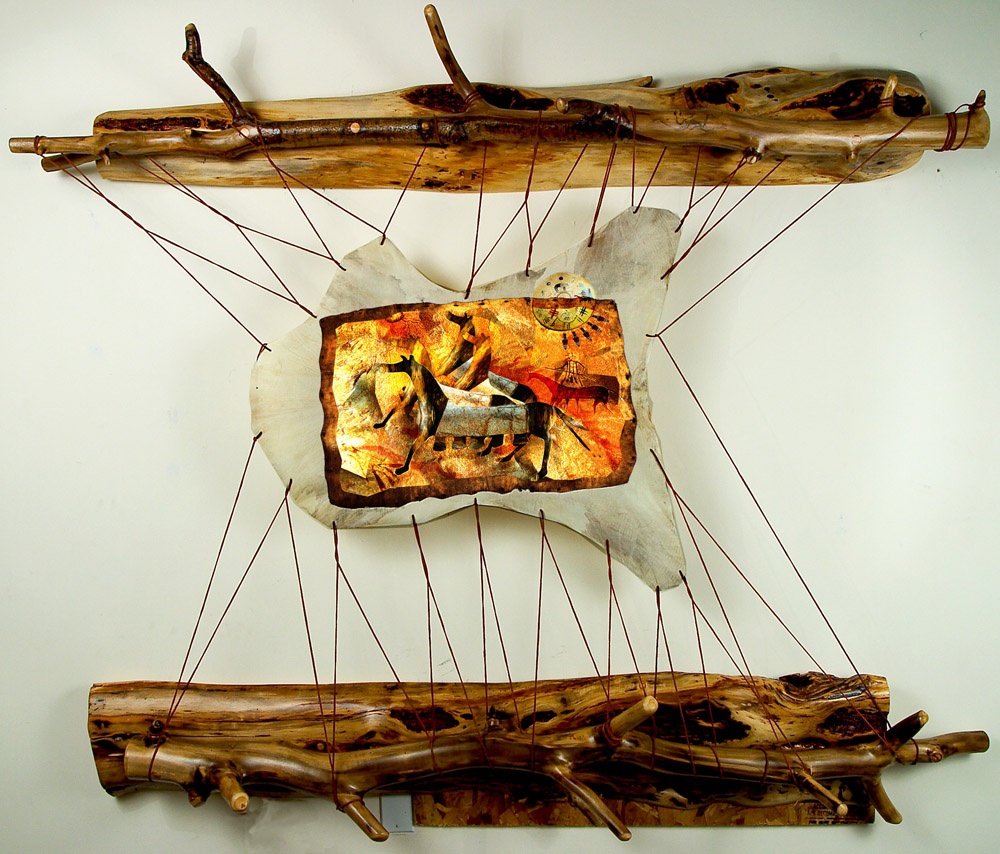
Digital Sun with Horse, Digital Rawhide Prints, (2004)

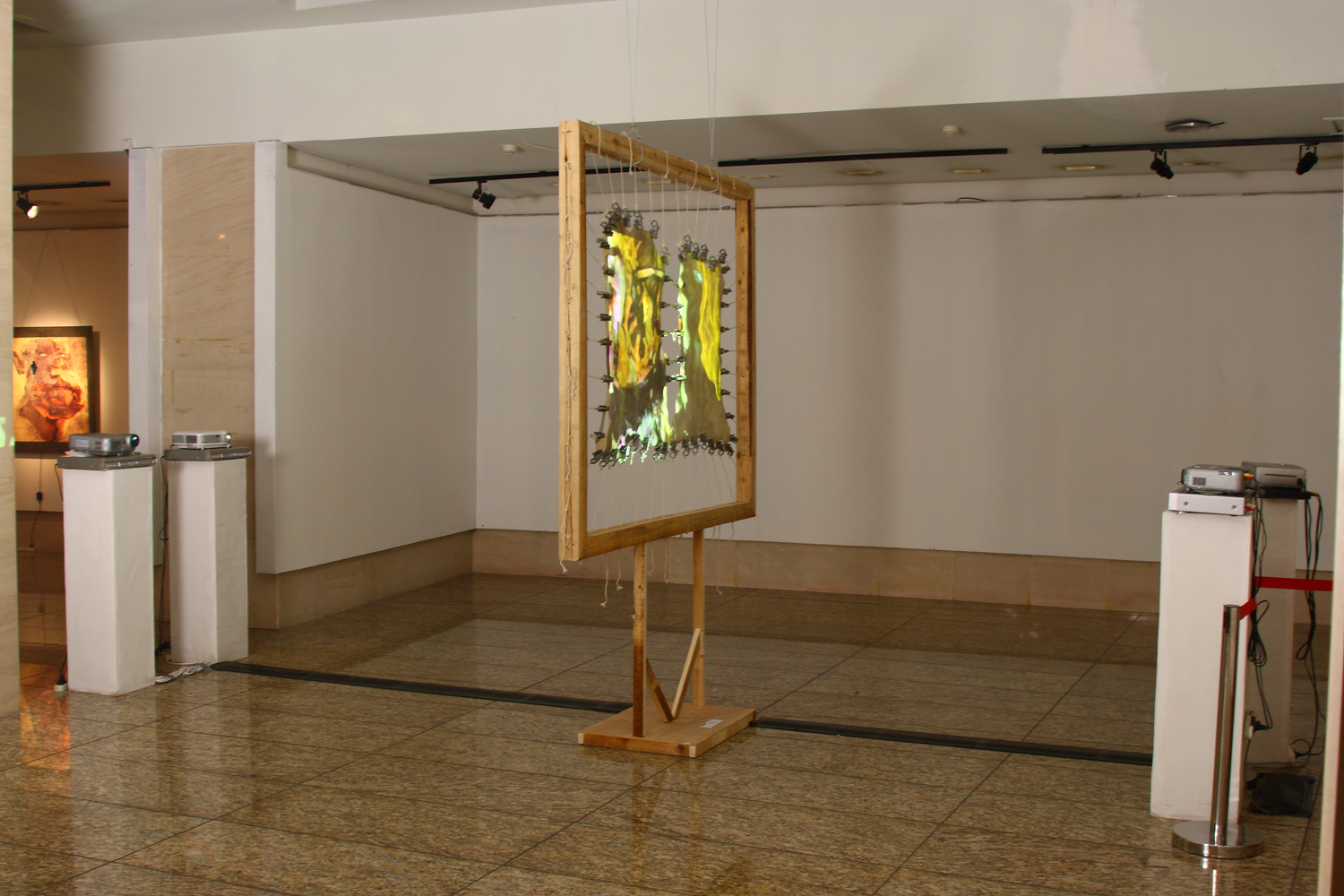
Digital Dancing, Digital Rawhide Projection, 2004

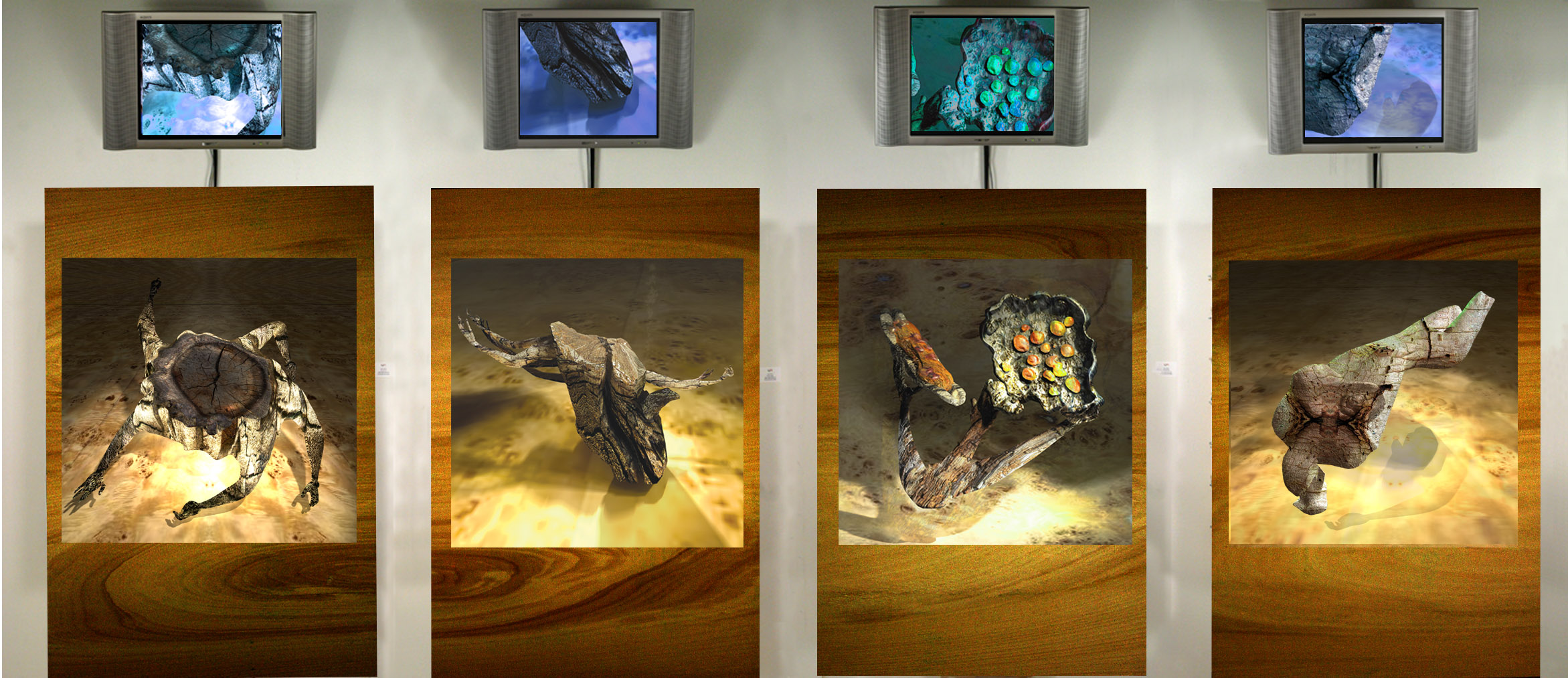
Burl-Arm + 4, Animation Installation w/ Digital Wood Prints, (2005)

Rusty Faces Series ( 2006-2007 )

Animation Installation w/ Digital Prints & LCD TVs

This series consists of three, large digital prints on copper, and four rust animations displayed on seven LCD TVs. The pieces emphasize work ethic and life attitude determine the degree to which one rusts. With digital animation technology, "Rusty-Faces" presents a contemporary artistic interpretation of the deterioration of mind, body, and spirit by harmful and self-destructive human behaviors.

BurlHair Series and LavaBody Series ( 2005-2006 ) Animation Installation w/ Digital Rock Prints, Mirrors & LCD TVs

3D lava body/hair images are printed on a rock surface, a procedure that involves using printing technology on exotic materials. Each of my rock prints is the result of extensive research in terms of color consistency and material experimentation.

The Matrox multi-display system allows the synchronized flow of animation among the six displays. The convex index, image shape, and dimension of the mirror generate an accurate virtual reflection of the lava animation. The convex index determines the size of the reflected lava animation, while the image shape determines the distance.

Burl + 4 Series ( 2004-2005 ) Animation Installation w/ Digital Wood-prints & LCD TVs

Includes various 3D images of different species, including human bodies and plants that are textured and formed by burl. These images are printed on various natural wood surfaces. The “Burl+4” series includes “BurlNuts+4,” “BurlBody+4,” “BurlFlower+4,” “BurlStampArm+4,” and “BurlHead + 4,” each of which is a group of pieces.

Natural wood shapes, human bodies, and primitive, folk, and contemporary art inspired the innovation of these 3D images. Related animation is screened alongside the prints on four LCD TVs. “Digital Nature” is the main theme in this art exploration.

Rawhide Series ( 2000-2004 )

Digital Rawhide Prints & Animation Projection 3D animation/modeling tribal-images are printed onto a rawhide surface using a digital inkjet printer. The rawhides are, in turn, stretched out by aluminum clamps and cotton strings, which are fastened to a naturally textured cedar wood frame. Various rawhides sizes and irregular shapes can be stretched using different lengths of strings at various angles.

All frames are made from 4” x 4” cedar wood, and stand at 60” wide and 72” high. By incorporating the LCD TVs, the 3D animations associated with the 3D images play in synchronization beside or above the rawhide prints.

Animation through Rawhide Projections 3D animation is projected onto both sides of the rawhides simultaneously. Due to the rawhides’ semi-transparency and roughly textured surface, the effects on the rawhides are spectacular, with both sides illuminated and in motion. This projection creates an illusion that the animation is permeating through the rawhides. The audience has the ability to admire the work from any angle.
