= Todd John Galda =

Canadian animator

TJ Galda

Background information
- Origin: Ontario, Canada
- Occupations: CG supervisor Consultant; Animator
- Years active: 1999—present

Todd John (TJ) Galda is a Canadian animator who has worked on 2 Academy Award-nominated films and 5 Emmy Award winning projects.

== Biography ==
Galda has distinguished himself in the field of film, animation, and video games since the 1990s. Most notably, Galda is recognized for being one of the 2006 Autodesk Maya Master Award recipients, as well as having earned a Lifetime Achievement award from the Ontario Government and appearing in McLean's Magazine, by the age of 29. Currently, he is the CG supervisor for Technicolor Creative Services, the company who brought color to film over 90 years ago. Working out of their North American VFX Headquarters, he helps to guide their visual effects department across multiple feature films.

An expert in his field, is asked to speak at round-table discussions, and has received several notable accolades. His noteworthy work includes helping with the creation of DreamWorks' newest animated logo, and working on award-winning feature films and television shows such as: Shark Tale, Over the Hedge, Kung Fu Panda, Fantastic Four, Rolie Polie Olie, and Rescue Heroes. His projects have accumulated a total of five Emmy Awards and one Academy Award nomination, as well as several Annies, video game awards (including Game of the Year), and other awards.

In his previous role at Electronic Arts Canada, Galda was in charge of all facets of art production for their $250 million dollar handheld gaming division (PSP, DS, and Wii), and overseeing production on over 25 games at a time.

Originally from Ontario, Canada), Galda is an instructor at the Vancouver Film School, and has also taught for Centennial College, the Bell Center for Creative Communication, and Electronic Arts' University. He has led courses in a wide range of topics, from lighting to project management, scripting, animation, rigging, modeling, and more.

Galda has just recently joined the Board of Advisors for Zerofootprint and is an active volunteer in the community.

Galda is the published author of Advanced Character Rigging: Creating Advanced Tendon and Muscle Systems.

== Filmography ==
- Passengers
- Assembly
- They Wait
- The 4400 (season 4)
- Kung Fu Panda
- The Fantastic Four
- Over the Hedge
- Shark Tale
- Rescue Heroes: The Movie (R&D)
- The Backyardigans (R&D)
- Rolie Polie Olie: The Baby Bot Chase
- Miss Spider: Sunnypatch Kids (special)
- Rolie Polie Olie: The Great Defender of Fun
- Pecola (both seasons)
- The Santa Claus Brothers
- Rolie Polie Olie (several seasons)
