= Sindhuja Rajaraman =

Indian artist and businesswoman

Sindhuja Rajamaran
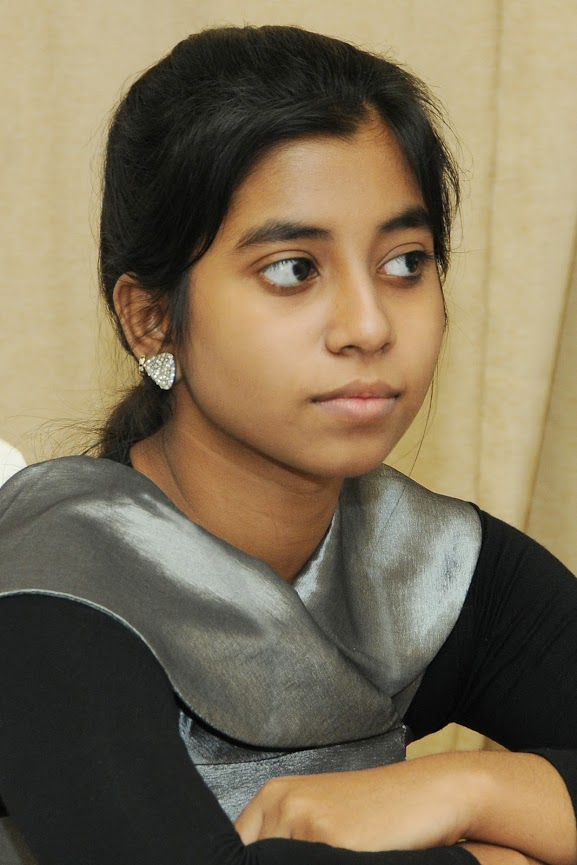
- FicciFlo, Women Entrepreneurs Meet 21 June 2012 at Hyatt Regency, Chennai
- Born: Sindhuja Kandamaran; January 26, 1997 (age 29); Chennai
- Occupations: Animator, Artist
- Parent(s): Rajamaran; Sumathi Rani

Sindhuja Rajamaran is an Indian animator and businesswoman. She became India's youngest CEO and 2D animator at the age of 14. She is reported to hold a Guinness World Record for becoming the youngest CEO in India of a Chennai-based animation company called Seppan, which was founded in October 2010 and had ten employees in 2014.

She has worked on three projects, including a project to create a replica of Thyagaraya Nagar. She has also done an Ad-Film with Joy-Alukas. She serves as a brand ambassador for Corel, who has described her as the youngest digital caricaturist in the world.

== History ==
Sindhuja Rajamaran was born on January 26, 1997. Her father is the first digital caricaturist in Tamil Nadu hailing from Ramanathapuram district and her younger sister is the youngest Indian to write haiku in India.

She started learning animation in her sixth standard. Later she worked four years under Kumaran Mani who was the founder of Tenth Planet Technologies. In Class IX, she took part in an animation competition held by an NGO where she made a three-minute-long animation film within 10 hours, entering the World Records as the fastest animation film. She was awarded the Fastest 2D Animator by Nasscom the Gaming and Animation Conclave 2010 which was held in Hyderabad. She went to her school, Velammal Matriculation School, till Class 10, and then was homeschooled.

At the age of 14, she was recognised as the youngest CEO in the country by National Association of Software and Service Companies after she took over as the CEO of Seppan Entertainment Pvt Ltd. A NGO ‘First Planet Technology (FPT)' recognised her potential and gave her the resources to start a new venture called ‘Seppan.com’. The post was created by her mentor, Kumaran Mani, CEO of 10th Planet Technology, to honour her skill and speed in animation. She did her graduation from iCAT Design & Media.
