= Niko Barun =

Croatian cartoonist and illustrator

Niko Barun (born 1965) is a Croatian cartoonist and illustrator. He experiments with different styles, so one of his works may be distinctly different from other art by him. His comics include Krapinjonci, Pipo, Small History of Money, and many more.

== Works ==
His 200 caricatures and over 300 illustrations have appeared in the following books, journals and magazines: "Trojica u trnju" "Samoborski list, "Naš Samobor", "Sraka", "Glas Slavonije", "Večernji list", "Slobodna Dalmacija". "Moja domovina Hrvatska", "Fun to Learn", "Junior Achievement", "Povratak profesora Baltazara", "Filipove bebe". To date, he has over 400 of comic pages in journals, including: "Gespenster", "Click-Clack", album "Mala povijest novca", "Striporama".

Barun has had three exhibitions: "Barokna strip alternativa" in Varaždin (1994), "Sferakon" in Samobor (1996), and "Gag strip" in Zagreb (2000).

He has also worked as an animator, fazer and drawer in for films, including: "Prozor na grad" and "Povratak profesora Baltazara".
