= Nick Hilligoss =

Australian stop motion animator

Nick Hilligoss is an Australian stop motion animator working with modelling and animation, with many past projects for Australian Broadcasting Corporation and ABC Natural History Unit in Melbourne. Hilligoss has received many awards for his animations.

== Filmography ==
- Once upon Australia: produced in 1995, this 26 minute documentary tries to show how the prehistoric life could have evolved besides the Continental drift of Australia. The program feature Sarcopterygian fishes, amphibians, dinosaurs (Allosaurus, Timimus and Leaellynasaura) and after them giant kangaroos. Other figures are the turtle Meiolania, a Tasmanian tiger and the giant lizard Megalania from the ancient Australian megafauna. The end of the program shows the extinction of humanity. Hilligoss says that he got some negative feelings during the production after watching Jurassic Park, because he thought people would not be impressed by his work after the CGIwork on Steven Spielberg's film. It took Hilligoss 2 ½ years to finish his work on the documentary.
- Turtle world: an 8-minute-long film based on the belief held by some ancient peoples that the world exists on the back of a giant Testudines. In the jungle growing on her back, a group of monkeys live. In time, they begin to build houses, causing deforestation and havoc. When the turtle realize what is happening, she dives into the deep ocean below her, destroying her world.
- Good riddance: In a town lives "Eco", a single living man working as exterminator. He tries to find ecologically acceptable methods to destroy vermin, instead of the devastating system used by the competing company SPLAT (Serious Pest Locators And Terminators), whose methods obliterate both varmints and owners in the mansions.
