= David Bolinsky =

American artist

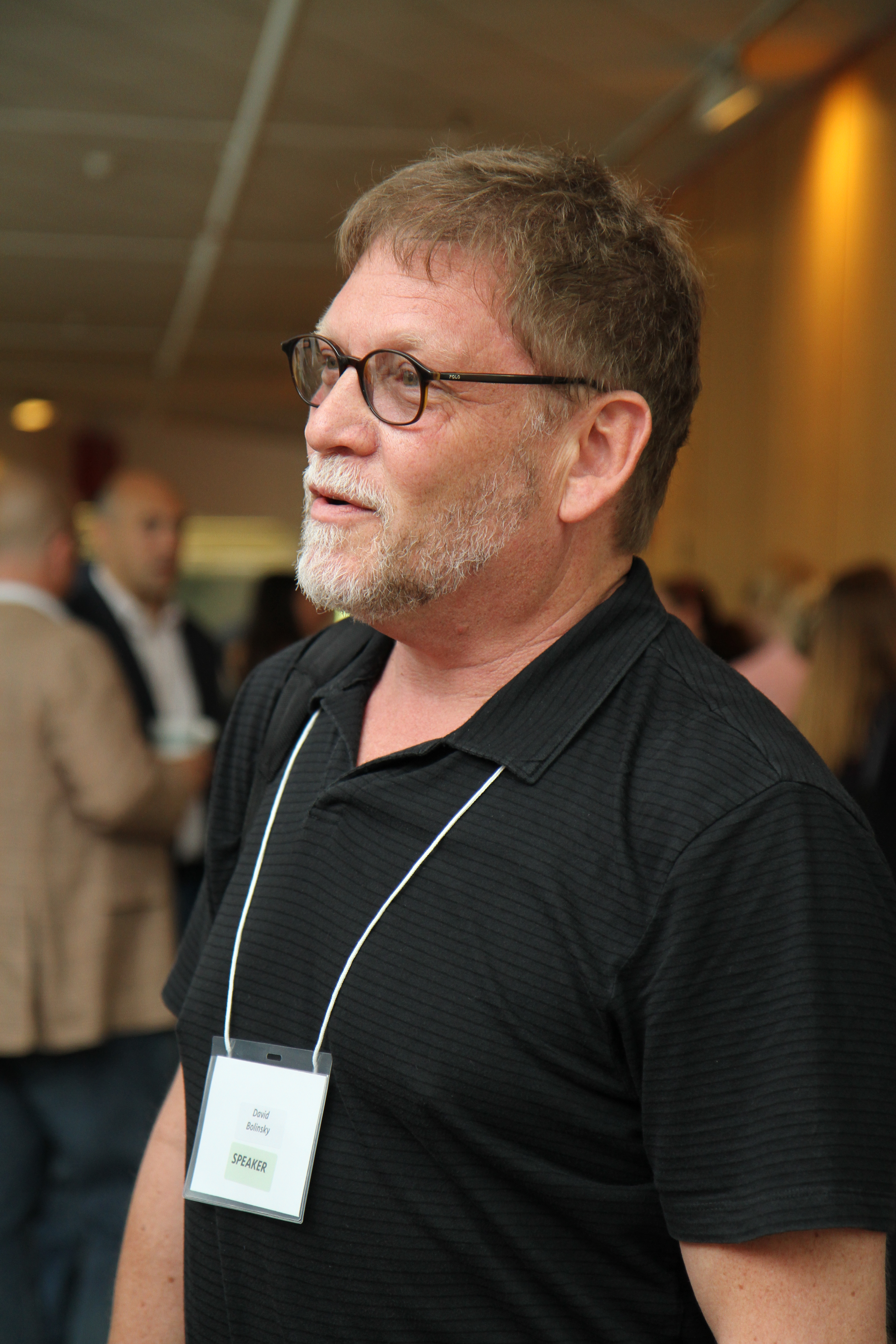
- Born: May 2, 1952 (age 74)
- Education: Ohio State University (BS, MA); Yale University (MD)
- Occupation: Medical Illustrator at e.mersion studios
- Spouse: Patty Harris
- Children: Jeremiah, Alexander, Shuanyi

David Bolinsky (born May 2, 1952) is a former lead medical illustrator at Yale. He is a co-founder of XVIVO, which produced the movie The Inner Life of the Cell for Harvard's Department of Molecular and Cellular Biology.

== Early life and education ==
Bolinsky's father, Joseph, was a sculptor and professor of art who taught at University at Buffalo, The State University of New York. His mother, Ruth, was a soprano with the New York City Opera, and both exposed Bolinsky to the world of visual and performing arts. His father began to teach him about flip book animations, drawing, painting, sculpting and pottery.

When Bolinsky turned 14, his biology teacher encouraged him to pursue drawing. After meeting Frank Netter, Bolinsky was inspired to get his M.D. and create animations for medical work instead of solely still life. In 1968, Netter presented him with the book The Moon is a Harsh Mistress, and this book gave Bolinsky the idea to do computer animations someday.

Bolinsky completed his 4 years of undergraduate studies from 1976 to 1980 at Ohio State University with a Bachelor of Science in medical illustration and a masters in anatomy.

Bolinsky began a new job at Michigan State University, where he had committed to attend Michigan State University College of Human Medicine quite soon after in 1977. He worked with dual faculty instructors in Human Medicine and Veterinarian Medicine, creating surgical illustrations for both subjects. His time with the Dean of Schools became impactful as he was encouraged to work at the biomedical center. Before entering Medical School, the biomedical center was closed by a newly hired Dean of school. Nonetheless, Bolinsky entered Medical School continuing his medical illustrations, having just signed a contract with a new publication. Bolinsky took a leave of absence and left Michigan State University to pursue an illustration project with Yale surgeon K.J Lee and continue medical school at Yale. He launched his first illustration company, Advanced Imaging Inc., in 1983.

== Career achievements ==
Bolinsky has given two Ted Talks: Visualizing the Wonder of a Living Cell and another on his journey with his daughter ShaungyiLi. He has written over 830 illustrations, working with major pharmaceutical companies such as Mayo Clinic and the National Institutes of Health. His work has also appeared in television such as HBO’s The Medicine Show as well as on NBC and ABC News. Other notable companies that David Bolinsky also partnered with for animation are Disney Imagineering, Genentech, the Bill & Melinda Gates Foundation, Johnson and Johnson, and schools such as Harvard University, Johns Hopkins University, Oxford University, and Yale University. His biggest accomplishment is the project The Inner Life of a Cell that visualizes aspects of cellular mechanics, with millions of views on the web. Bolinsky also designed and served as one of the narrators for an Internet video entitled Flu Attack! How A Virus Invades Your Body. Recently, Bolinsky founded e.mersion studios in 2012 for educational and commercial work.

== Awards ==
A list of honors and awards includes first place in the American Journal of Nursing Media Festival, Award of Excellence for Animation and Outstanding Example of Animation (AMI), first place in the Journal of Biocommunication, second place in the White House News Photographers Association Multimedia Innovation Contest (2010), American Medical Student Association Medical Art Award, Gold Award for Association of Visual Communications, Gold Award for International Film and Tv Festival of New York, Award of Excellence for the Society for Technical Communication, and Finalist in the Telly Awards Bronze Winner.
