= Graham Johnson (scientist) =

American animator and illustrator (born 1973)

- Johnson in 2022
- Born: 1973 (age 52–53); Ohio, U.S.
- Education: St. Mary's College of Maryland (B.A.); Johns Hopkins School of Medicine (M.A.); The Scripps Research Institute (PhD in Biology with a Biophysics track)
- Known for: Medical illustration, NSF Predoctoral Fellowship, NSF and Science Magazine Scientific Visualization Challenge, computational biology, and scientific visualization
- Scientific career
- Doctoral advisor: Arthur Olson TSRI

Graham Johnson is an animator, illustrator and, beginning in 2012, faculty fellow at the California Institute for Quantitative Biosciences. He has a master's degree in medical illustration from Johns Hopkins, (Note: Specifically, a degree in Medical and Biological Illustration from the Department of Art as Applied to Medicine.) and a PhD in biophysics from Scripps. After graduating from Johns Hopkins and while working at the Salk Institute, he illustrated the textbook Cell Biology. (Note: Cell Biology: See OCLC 70284432)

Johnson is the creator of the software applications "autoPACK" and "cellPACK" which enable modeling, simulation and visualization of mesoscopic three-dimensional spatial data utilizing packing algorithms.
