= Bunnicula =

Book series by James Howe

- Bunnicula: A Rabbit-Tale of Mystery; Howliday Inn; The Celery Stalks at Midnight; Nighty-Nightmare; Return to Howliday Inn; Bunnicula Strikes Again!; Bunnicula Meets Edgar Allan Crow
- Author: Deborah Howe; James Howe
- Language: English
- Genre: Children's literature
- Publisher: Atheneum Books
- Published: April 1979 – 2006

Bunnicula is a children's novel series. The first installment was written by James and Deborah Howe, and introduced a vampire rabbit named Bunnicula who sucks the juice out of vegetables. Deborah died in June 1978, before the first book was printed, and James continued the project alone. The series consists of seven books, published between 1979 and 2006.

== Characters ==
=== Bunnicula ===
The titular character is a harmless rabbit with unusual eating habits and minor vampiric qualities. Toby, a member of the Monroe family, found the rabbit in a theater while the film Dracula was screening. Bunnicula is subjected to many murder attempts by Chester. The authors never produced an actual origin for him or his abilities, nor did they ever explicitly confirm or deny that Bunnicula was a vampire.

=== Harold ===
Harold is an old, scruffy and loving dog under the Monroes' care who narrates the books.

=== Chester ===
The highly imaginative, prideful orange tabby cat who loves good literature and milk. Ever since Bunnicula's arrival, Chester has become increasingly jealous and convinced that the bunny could be a threat, though by the end he becomes friends with Bunnicula. Chester is often paranoid.

=== Howie ===
The carefree and sometimes slightly dim Dachshund puppy who was adopted by the Monroes from Chateau Bow-Wow, he views Chester as his father.

=== Peter "Pete" Monroe ===
The oldest of two boys who slacks off often, he often bullies his younger brother Toby and the pets, except for Bunnicula.

=== Toby Monroe ===
The younger of two boys, Toby is portrayed as kinder than Pete and is shown sharing snacks with Harold during his late-night reading sessions. He is depicted as being well liked by Harold, Chester, Bunnicula, and Howie. Toby’s family later adopts Bunnicula after bringing him home.

== Series plot ==
The story focuses on the Monroe family and their pets, but is told from the perspective of their dog Harold. Bunnicula is the family's pet rabbit which the Monroes found at a theater during a showing of the film Dracula.

=== Howliday Inn (1982) ===
When the Monroe family decides to leave for a vacation, they send Harold and Chester off to a kennel called Chateau Bow-Wow, where they meet the other inhabitants of the kennel, including a poodle named Louise and two dachshunds named Heather and Howard. The owner of the kennel, Dr. Greenbriar, takes the week off and the other staff, Jill and Harrison, are overworked. Louise goes missing and Chester becomes convinced that foul play was involved before he vanishes as well. Upon returning, he leads the other animals to find Harrison trying to capture Heather and Howard. Chester tells Harold later that Harrison caught wind that one of the animals in the shelter was very valuable. He kidnapped Louise and then Chester, thinking that it could have been one of them. It is revealed that it was the dachshunds, who are rare wire-haired dachshunds. When the Monroe family returns from their vacation, they reveal that they are adopting the runt of the Dachshund litter, who they name Howie.

=== The Celery Stalks at Midnight (1983) ===
Bunnicula has gone missing and Chester begins to fear for the town again. He believes that the vegetables that Bunnicula sucks dry could return as the rabbit's vampire slaves to use as an army to take over the town. He, Harold, and Howie set off to search the neighborhood. They witness Toby and Pete wearing dark robes and holding a group of frightened children prisoner. The pets fear that Bunnicula has begun to control people and run to the nearby school. After causing much mayhem they are caught by the Monroes. It is revealed that there was a carnival at the school that day and Toby, Pete and the other children were rehearsing for a play they were going to put on. Bunnicula is discovered to have been entered in the pet show at school. The title is a reference to the 1951 animated film of the same name by John Whitney.

=== Nighty Nightmare (1987) ===
Mr. Monroe has a midlife crisis and wants to do something exciting while he is at his lakeside retreat of Boggy Lake while fishing with Harold, Chester, and Howie. He decides to go camping out in the woods. They meet two men, Bud and Spud, and their dog Dawg. That night, they go out for a walk, and Dawg leads Harold, Chester, and Howie away from his masters and the Monroes to show them something "neat", getting them lost in the woods. Chester begins to suspect that Bud and Spud are planning to murder the Monroes and that Dawg is luring them away to keep them from interfering. Once they reach a house right in the middle of the woods, Chester tells a story about Bunnicula's origin in an attempt to lull Dawg to sleep and allow himself, Harold, and Howie to escape. While the plan is successful, Harold, Howie, and Chester fall asleep along with Dawg, and awaken shortly before dawn. After they return to the Monroes' camp, only to find it trashed and deserted, Dawg reveals that the house they visited is his own. The Monroes also stayed the night with them to avoid the rain, and are relieved that Harold, Howie, and Chester are unharmed.

=== Return to Howliday Inn (1992) ===
The Monroe family leaves Harold, Chester, and Howie at Chateau Bow-Wow again. The pets quickly notice differences, including a new group of animals staying there, including a sad Great Dane named Hamlet. The three Monroe pets learn that Hamlet's old owner left him there a long time ago. Chester finds his owner's new address and they leave the chateau to escort Hamlet there. The new address turns out to be a nursing home that does not allow animals. Hamlet finds his old owner, and it is revealed that the owner was a ventriloquist. Using ventriloquism, the pets and patients convince the staff of the nursing home to allow Hamlet to stay. When Harold, Chester, and Howie are picked up at the end, they fool the Monroes with the ventriloquism tricks they learned.

=== Bunnicula Strikes Again! (1999) ===
Chester suspects again that Bunnicula is a threatening vampire and starts drinking the rabbit's juice in the daytime so Bunnicula will die of starvation. One night, Harold notices Bunnicula crying while singing him a lullaby. Chester thinks he misses his mother, and in the next few days, he leads the two dogs to search for her to no luck. When Bunnicula becomes increasingly ill, he is taken to the veterinarian. Chester runs away to a condemned building, which collapses, and both he and Bunnicula are trapped under rubble. Harold and Howie manage to alert the Monroes who dig through the rubble and find them both unharmed. Chester finally accepts Bunnicula.

=== Bunnicula Meets Edgar Allan Crow (2006) ===
Pete writes to M.T. Graves, the author of his (and Howie's) favorite series, FleshCrawlers. He visits the Monroe household and stays in the guestroom, bringing with him his favorite pet crow, Edgar Allan Crow. Everyone is thrilled, except for Chester, who insists that the author is suspicious. Harold and Howie are not convinced, but Chester is convinced that there is a secret society among the crows and Edgar is a messenger sent to help Graves transform Bunnicula into a bat. When Bunnicula escapes, the entire party chases after him, and Harold and Howie begin to think that Chester may have been right. M.T. Graves is very careful about a black bag, and when Bunnicula is not found, Chester believes he is trapped in the bag. Harold dumps the bag, only to discover it is filled with stuffed animals. M.T. Graves tells them that he stayed at the Monroes' house so that he could conquer his phobia of animals.

== Spin-offs ==
Following the end of the Bunnicula series, James wrote a spin-off series called Tales from the House of Bunnicula, which is "written" by Howie, the Dachshund puppy who was introduced into the series in Howliday Inn. The Bunnicula and Friends: Ready to Read series contains six picture books about the adventures of the characters, and is aimed at beginner readers.

== Adaptations ==
A 1982 animated TV special (from Ruby-Spears) by the same name was created based on the first book and aired on the ABC Weekend Special.

An animated series loosely adapted from the book series began airing on Cartoon Network and on Boomerang on 6 February 2016.

A stage adaptation based on the books was written by Jon Klein and performed by the B Street Theatre in Sacramento, California. An additional stage adaptation was created for a children's theatre at the DR2 Theatre in New York, adapted by writer Charles Busch.

In 2022, Bunnicula: The Graphic Novel, an adaptation of the first book in the series by Andrew Donkin and art by Stephen Gilpin, was released.
