= Bunnicula (TV series) =

American animated television series

- Genre: Children's comedy; Action; Adventure; Black comedy; Dark fantasy; Comedy horror; Supernatural
- Based on: Bunnicula by: James Howe and; Deborah Howe
- Developed by: Jessica Borutski
- Voices of: Chris Kattan; Sean Astin; Brian Kimmet; Kari Wahlgren
- Theme music composer: Paul E. Francis
- Opening theme: "Bunnicula Theme"
- Composers: Paul E. Francis; Drew Neumann (episodes 1–8)
- Country of origin: United States
- Original language: English
- No. of seasons: 3
- No. of episodes: 104 (list of episodes)

Production
- Executive producer: Sam Register
- Producers: Jessica Borutski; Maxwell Atoms (season 1); Shaunt Nigoghossian (season 2)
- Editor: Nick Reczynski
- Running time: 10–11 minutes
- Production company: Warner Bros. Animation

Original release
- Network: Cartoon Network
- Release: February 6 – March 12, 2016
- Network: Boomerang; Boomerang SVOD
- Release: April 11, 2017 – December 30, 2018

Bunnicula is an American animated television series from Warner Bros. Animation developed by Jessica Borutski, produced by Borutski and Maxwell Atoms, and broadcast by Cartoon Network and Boomerang. The show is loosely based on the children's book series of the same name by James and Deborah Howe. In the show, a vampire rabbit named Bunnicula drinks carrot juice instead of blood to strengthen his super abilities in new paranormal adventures.

== Plot ==
After moving to New Orleans with her father and their two pets, Chester and Harold, Mina Monroe is left with a key given to her by her late Aunt Marie that she uses to open a cellar in the Orlock Apartments. Doing this frees a vampire rabbit named Bunnicula, who drains vegetables, instead of blood to strengthen his powers. Unaware of his traits, she adopts him and makes him a new member of the Monroe family. The series is mostly set with Chester and Harold joining Bunnicula in his supernatural adventures involving situations that only he can solve.

== Episodes ==
Season	Episodes		Originally released		
Season	Episodes		First released	Last released	Network
1	40	8	February 6, 2016	March 12, 2016	Cartoon Network
1	40	32	April 11, 2017	December 21, 2017	Boomerang; Boomerang SVOD
2	40		December 21, 2017	November 29, 2018	Boomerang; Boomerang SVOD
3	24		December 1, 2018	December 30, 2018	Boomerang; Boomerang SVOD

== Characters ==
=== Main ===
- Bunnicula (voiced by Chris Kattan) is the titular character of the show. He is a vampiric Dutch rabbit and the former pet of Dracula who was sealed in a cellar until Mina freed him. Bunnicula usually speaks in unintelligible nasal English, although Harold and other supernatural creatures can understand him. He can fly by transforming his ears into bat wings and gain various abilities by eating specific foods.
- Chester (voiced by Sean Astin) is Mina's sarcastic pet Siamese cat. Although he does value Bunnicula as a friend, he is often exasperated with him. This is mainly because he is constantly terrified of the monsters and supernatural phenomena that happen around him and his friends.
- Harold (voiced by Brian Kimmet) is Mina's pet dog. He loves his friends Chester and Bunnicula, and their owner, Mina. He is not particularly intelligent, but despite this he is the only one who can fluently understand Bunnicula and usually translates for him to Chester. He is also fiercely loyal and values the friendships he has.
- Mina Monroe (voiced by Kari Wahlgren) is a 13-year-old girl and the owner of Chester, Harold, and Bunnicula who has just moved to New Orleans from middle America with her father. She freed Bunnicula from his prison in the cellar with a key that her aunt Marie gave her. Mina is oblivious to Bunnicula's vampiric nature until the series finale, but chooses to embrace him after learning.

=== Others ===
- Arthur Monroe (voiced by Chris Kattan) is Mina's father who moves with his daughter to New Orleans from Middle America after inheriting an apartment from Aunt Marie. His face is usually unseen, blocked by the camera or other obstacles, that is until the series finale when his face is finally revealed.
- Marsha (voiced by Monie Mon) is Mina's cautious and shy best friend, who serves as a foil to her. Marsha is extremely unlucky and often the only human to notice supernatural activity.
- Becky (voiced by Kate Higgins) is Mina's other best friend. Becky is very monotone and sarcastic, acting like the stereotypical teenage girl.
- Scott Dingleman (voiced by Scott Menville) is Mina's love interest who shares many of her interests. After Bunnicula, Chester, and Harold accidentally erase and restore his memories, Scott gains the ability to understand them, but chooses to keep it a secret.
- Madame Polidori (voiced by Grey Griffin) is the owner of a shop that sells supernatural objects. She is named for John Polidori, author of The Vampyre.
- Patches (voiced by Eric Bauza) is a laidback, fun-loving "weredude", a cat with the ability to transform into a human. He moves into the Orlock Apartments in the episode "Revenge of the Return of the Curse of the Weredude".
- Lugosi (voiced by Richard Steven Horvitz) is a deformed and insane guinea pig obsessed with serving Bunnicula. He is later adopted by Marsha, who he declares his new master. He is named for Bela Lugosi, famous for playing Dracula in the 1931 film from Universal Pictures.
- Rusty Bones (voiced by Greg Eagles) is the ghost of a depressed blues singer who sings about his life and curses anyone who mocks him.
- Fluffy (voiced by Sumalee Montano) is a Doberman Pinscher who hunts vampires and is initially an enemy to Bunnicula before they become friends.
- Elvira (voiced by Kari Wahlgren) is an imaginary cat.
- Veronica Rabbit (voiced by Abby Trott) is a rabbit.
- Baron Karloff (voiced by Donovan Patton) is a vampiric French Bulldog and fan of Fluffy. He is named for Boris Karloff, who portrayed Frankenstein's monster.
- Hamburger Cheese (voiced by Scott Menville) is Mina's childhood imaginary friend.
- Mike Myers (voiced by Jeff Bergman) is a false animal protection officer.
- Cassandra (voiced by Audrey Wasilewski) is a ghostly Southern alligator.
- Rafferty (voiced by Richard Steven Horvitz) is an albino squirrel.
- Count Cavanda (voiced by Scott Menville) is a vampire tick. Count Cavanda is a parody of Count Dracula.
- Dr. Pistachio (voiced by Eric Bauza) is a squirrel.
- Kenko (voiced by Patrick Warburton) is an evil wrath demon.
- Chaos (voiced by Fred Tatasciore) is a cattle-headed demon gangster.
- The West-End Lionesses are a gang of anthropomorphic lionesses who operate in West End, New Orleans.
- The South Street Soul Stealers are a gang of spiritual skulls who operate on South Street.
- The Spanish Moss Swamp Beasts are a gang of swamp monsters.
- The Dumont Moth Men are a gang of mothmen.
- The Bay City Krakens are a gang of Krakens.
- The Jefferson Parish Pixies (all voiced by Karen Fukuhara) are a pixie gang who operate in Jefferson Parish.
- The Gentilly Rat Pack are a gang of anthropomorphic rats who operate in the sewers of Gentilly. They consist of an unnamed leader (voiced by Robert Catrini), Carmine, Danny, Enzo, Rocko, and Big Tony.
- The Futbol Furries are a gang of soccer-playing werewolves, led by an unnamed leader (voiced by Rhasaan Orange).
- The Skeleton Crew are a gang of skeletons who are vulnerable to Harold's love of bones.
- Bunnicula's Brother (voiced by Chris Kattan) is Bunnicula's younger brother, who can drain life force, instead of juice. Introduced in the series finale, he attacks various supernatural creatures before Bunnicula pacifies him with love energy.

== Broadcast ==
Bunnicula premiered on Cartoon Network on February 6, 2016, and then premiered on Boomerang on the same day. The series was picked up for a second and third season, but moved to Boomerang entirely on April 11, 2017.

Although Warner Bros. stated that the third season of Bunnicula would premiere on the Boomerang streaming service in 2019, every episode from that season first premiered on the Boomerang network, airing from December 1, and ending on December 30. After the series ended, reruns continued to air on Boomerang until 2021.

In Canada, the series started airing on Teletoon on April 2, 2016. The series premiered on Boomerang on May 2 in the United Kingdom and Ireland. The series premiered on Boomerang on July 18 in Australia and New Zealand.

In India, the series premiered on Pogo.

The series was streamed on Boomerang's SVOD subscription service from 2017 to 2023. As of 2021, the first season is viewable by purchase on YouTube within the United States, on both an individual-episode and full season basis.

As of 2025, the series is currently available on HBO Max in some regions.

== Home media ==
"Night of the Vegetable", a 2-disc DVD set featuring the first 20 episodes of season one, was released on June 27, 2017, by Warner Home Video. Originally, Warner Home Video was planning to release another 2-disc DVD set featuring the remaining 20 episodes of season one on February 13, 2018, but that release was cancelled for unknown reasons. Instead, Warner Home Video released "The Complete First Season", a 4-disc set containing all 40 episodes from season one, on May 8 the same year.

Bunnicula home video releases
Season	Episodes	Release dates
Season	Episodes	Region 1
1	40	Volume 1: Night of the Vegetable (episodes 1–20): June 27, 2017; The Complete First Season: May 8, 2018

== Reception ==
Bunnicula has received positive reviews. Common Sense Media gave the series three stars out of five. Critic Emily Ashby states that the series is a fun pick for the whole family to enjoy with its silly antics and lighthearted paranormality.
