= Any Witch Way =

Any Witch Way may refer to:

- Bunnicula S3E9
- Adam's Family Tree S1E4
