= Thingy =

Thingy may refer to:

- A placeholder word, used to refer to something you don't remember the name of at the specific moment in time.
- Thingy (band), an Indie rock band
- Thingee, an alien puppet character on children's television shows in New Zealand
- "The Thingy", an episode of Bunnicula, an animated series
