= Mister Tinker in Oz =

1985 book by James Howe

Mr. Tinker In Oz
- Mr. Tinker in Oz by James Howe
- Author: James Howe
- Illustrator: David Rose
- Language: English
- Genre: Fantasy/Children's novel
- Publisher: Random House
- Publication date: 1985
- Publication place: United States
- Media type: Print (Paperback)
- Pages: 64 pp
- ISBN: 0-394-97038-1
- OCLC: 11044733
- LC Class: PZ7.H83727 Mi 1985

Mister Tinker in Oz is an apocryphal Oz book, authored by James Howe and published in 1985 by Random House. The book involves an inventor responsible for Tik-Tok the Clockwork man, who involves Dorothy in a new adventure in Oz.

The book was part of a series of new Oz books published by Random House, which also included Dorothy and the Magic Belt, Dorothy and the Seven-Leaf Clover, and Ozma and the Wayward Wand.

== Plot summary ==
One night in Kansas, Dorothy meets Ezra P. Tinker, the inventor of Tik-Tok the clockwork man, and he tells her the thousand year guarantee has just run down. With the help of Mister Tinker's speckoscope and Julius Quickscissors they return to Oz. They encounter a group of babies called the Widdlebits and trek across the bottomless swamp. Finally, they make it to the Emerald City, where Dorothy is able to be sent home once again.

== Sources ==
- The Oz Encyclopedia at Piglet Press
- Mister Tinker in Oz in libraries (WorldCat catalog)
