= List of Bunnicula episodes =

Episodes of American animated TV series

This is the list of episodes for Bunnicula, an animated series based on the original books written by Deborah Howe and James Howe.

== Series overview ==
Season	Episodes		Originally released		
Season	Episodes		First released	Last released	Network
1	40	8	February 6, 2016	March 12, 2016	Cartoon Network
1	40	32	April 11, 2017	December 21, 2017	Boomerang; Boomerang SVOD
2	40		December 21, 2017	November 29, 2018	Boomerang; Boomerang SVOD
3	24		December 1, 2018	December 30, 2018	Boomerang; Boomerang SVOD

== Episodes ==
=== Season 1 (2016–17) ===
No. overall	No. in season	Title	Directed by	Written by	Storyboarded by	Original release date	U.S. viewers (millions)
Cartoon Network
1	1	"Mumkey Business"	Jessica Borutski	Maxwell Atoms and Jessica Borutski	Jessica Borutski	February 6, 2016	1.24
When Chester is tired of Bunnicula's ghoulish mischief, he decides to lock him back in the cellar, but this proves to be a mistake when a little beast attacks the apartment.
2	2	"Walking Fish"	Jessica Borutski	Jessica Borutski	Jessica Borutski	February 6, 2016	1.24
Bunnicula and Harold play some tunes on a mysterious harmonica that accidentally zombifies all the dead fish in New Orleans and they converge on the apartments.
3	3	"Spider Lamb"	Maxwell Atoms	Maxwell Atoms	Maxwell Atoms	February 13, 2016	1.12
After Harold comes home from having surgery when eating a soccer ball, Chester and Bunnicula commit to helping their friend get some rest and read him a bedtime story, but after a monstrous lamb-spider hybrid emerges from the book, Bunnicula and Chester are afraid their immobilized friend will be eaten, so they team up to save him.
4	4	"Alligator Tears"	Jessica Borutski	Maxwell Atoms and Jessica Borutski	Jessica Borutski	February 13, 2016	1.12
When a ghostly alligator looking for her missing earring is haunting the sewers spreading a crying curse through the apartment, only Bunnicula can set things right before everyone drowns in their own waterworks.
5	5	"Muddy Harry"	Maxwell Atoms	Maxwell Atoms	Maxwell Atoms	February 20, 2016	1.04
After Mina and her friends try to invoke Bloody Mary in the hall mirror, Harold discovers that they've actually conjured a mud monster that he is excited to introduce to his friends.
6	6	"Garlicked"	Jessica Borutski	Maxwell Atoms and Jessica Borutski	Maxwell Atoms, Jessica Borutski, and Frank Detrano	February 27, 2016	1.06
When Chester feeds Bunnicula garlic as a way to remove his vampire powers, Bunnicula's fur falls off and he becomes a cute, dancing skeleton, but after Chester realizes that Mina's heart will break if she realizes Bunnicula is a real vampire, he and Harold must cover up the problem.
7	7	"Whooo Is... the Knight Owl"	Jessica Borutski	Maxwell Atoms and Jessica Borutski	Jessica Borutski	March 5, 2016	1.24
When Chester realizes that Bunnicula isn't enough to protect the Orlock Apartments from supernatural forces, Bunnicula introduces his friends to the Knight Owl — a dedicated defender of the downtrodden, but the family's new protector seems to be a little too good at his job.
8	8	"Squeaky Doom"	Robert F. Hughes	Maxwell Atoms and Robert F. Hughes	Robert F. Hughes	March 12, 2016	0.98
The spirit of an evil Viking warrior known as Friendless Sven the Destroyer returns to life in the body of Harold's squeaky dog toy seeking revenge against Bunnicula.
Boomerang
9	9	"Son of Bunnicula"	Matthew Whitlock	Maxwell Atoms and Matthew Whitlock	Ian Wasseluk and Matthew Whitlock	April 11, 2017	N/A
After Chester assumes that an eggplant will cause Bunnicula to lay a monster egg, Bunnicula decides to pull a prank on Chester and dresses up as his own baby.
10	10	"Evil Cat Videos"	Maxwell Atoms	Maxwell Atoms and Karl Hadrika	Karl Hadrika	April 11, 2017	N/A
Chester isn't acting like himself lately, but the trouble doesn't really start until Bunnicula realizes that Chester has been watching a possessed video cassette.
11	11	"Chester's Shop of Horrors"	Matt Whitlock	Josie Campbell and Karl Hadrika	Karl Hadrika	April 11, 2017	N/A
Chester takes a shine to a sinister Venus flytrap because the plant scares Bunnicula, but the plant has plans of its own.
12	12	"Curse of the Weredude"	Ian Wasseluk	Maxwell Atoms and Ian Wasseluk	Ian Wasseluk	April 11, 2017; October 1, 2018 (Cartoon Network)	0.19 (Cartoon Network)
When Chester desires to be human to impress Mina, he gets more than he bargained for after Bunnicula introduces him to Patches the Weredude.
13	13	"Bride of Bunnicula"	Ian Wasseluk	Darrick Bachman and Karl Hadrika	Karl Hadrika	April 11, 2017	N/A
Mina builds a vegetable monster for her science project, but when a blast of static electricity brings the creature to life, Bunnicula instantly falls for her charms.
14	14	"Nevermoar"	Robert F. Hugues	Maxwell Atoms and Erin Kavanagh	Erin Kavanagh	June 15, 2017 (Boomerang SVOD); October 1, 2018 (Boomerang)	N/A
Bunnicula and Chester go into the internet to stop an evil raven from feasting on the anger and hatred of everyone online.
15	15	"Vampire Rabbit Season"	Ian Wasseluk	Maxwell Atoms and Lane Raichert	Lane Raichert	June 15, 2017 (Boomerang SVOD); October 1, 2018 (Boomerang)	N/A
Fluffy the Vampire Pointer sets out to vanquish Bunnicula once and for all when she suspects Mina and her pets are under his control.
16	16	"Hole of the Unworthy"	Robert F. Hughes	Karl Hadrika and Robert F. Hughes	James Fujii and Karl Hadrika	June 15, 2017 (Boomerang SVOD); October 2, 2018 (Boomerang)	N/A
A disfigured guinea pig visits Bunnicula and has plans to banish Chester to the Hole of the Unworthy.
17	17	"Adopt a Vampire"	Robert F. Hughes	Darrick Bachman and Edward Rivera	Edward Rivera	June 15, 2017 (Boomerang SVOD); October 2, 2018 (Boomerang)	N/A
Fed up with Bunnicula's shenangians, Chester decides to put him up for adoption, but when Harold ends up being taken away by a kooky old lady, the two must put their differences aside and save him.
18	18	"Haunted Dog House"	Robert F. Hughes	Maxwell Atoms and Robert F. Hugues	James Fujii	June 15, 2017 (Boomerang SVOD); October 3, 2018 (Boomerang)	N/A
Mina leaves the pets out overnight in the spooky old dog house, not realizing that the doghouse is haunted by the ghost of a playful puppy from the 1930s, who won't rest until someone plays with him.
19	19	"Lucky Vampire's Foot"	Matt Whitlock	Ben Joseph and Matt Sullivan	Matt Sullivan	June 15, 2017 (Boomerang SVOD); October 3, 2018 (Boomerang)	N/A
Chester steals Bunnicula's foot to improve his luck; Bunnicula's luck gets worse and worse.
20	20	"Ghost Chef"	Matthew Whitlock	Darrick Bachman and Erin Kavanagh	Erin Kavanagh	June 15, 2017 (Boomerang SVOD); October 1, 2018 (Boomerang)	N/A
Bunnicula summons the ghost of Mina's cooking idol to aid her.
21	21	"Catula"	Matt Whitlock	Ben Joseph and Matt Whitlock	Matt Whitlock	June 15, 2017 (Boomerang SVOD); October 1, 2018 (Boomerang)	N/A
After Bunnicula accidentally bites Chester, the cat is convinced that he is also becoming a creature of the night.
22	22	"Dreamcatcher"	Maxwell Atoms	Maxwell Atoms and Erin Kavanagh	Erin Kavanagh	June 15, 2017 (Boomerang SVOD); October 2, 2018 (Boomerang)	N/A
Mina is plagued by nightmares, so Bunnicula pulls Chester and Harold in her dreams to help solve the problem.
23	23	"Ghost Pepper"	Maxwell Atoms	Joseph Adams and Darrick Bachman	Joseph Adams	June 15, 2017 (Boomerang SVOD); October 2, 2018 (Boomerang)	N/A
Bunnicula consumes a spicy ghost pepper, then starts burning up everything in sight; Harold and Chester try to cool things off.
24	24	"Dating for Dummies"	Ian Wasseluk	Karl Hadrika, Erin Kavanagh, and Ian Wasseluk	Karl Hadrika and Erin Kavanagh	June 15, 2017 (Boomerang SVOD); October 6, 2018 (Boomerang)	N/A
Bunnicula and his friends realize Mina's dad has been played for a dummy when he goes on a date with a female ventriloquist.
25	25	"Sunday Bunnday"	Matt Whitlock	Lane Raichert and Matt Whitlock	Lane Raichert	June 15, 2017 (Boomerang SVOD); October 1, 2018 (Cartoon Network)	0.19 (Cartoon Network)
Bunnicula finds himself far from the Orlock Apartments at sunrise, and desperately attempts to return home before the sun's rays turn him to ash.
26	26	"Scaraoke"	Maxwell Atoms	Darrick Bachman and Lane Raichert	Lane Raichert	June 15, 2017 (Boomerang SVOD); October 7, 2018 (Boomerang)	N/A
After Mina performs some horrendous karaoke on an old blues singer's song, Bunnicula intervenes to stop the blues singer's ghost from ruining Mina's life.
27	27	"Bearshee"	Maxwell Atoms	Maxwell Atoms	Maxwell Atoms	September 28, 2017	N/A
A screaming spectral bear named Siobhan arrives at the apartments, and Bunnicula discovers she is scared of non-supernatural creatures.
28	28	"Beware Apartment 13!"	Ian Wasseluk	Karl Hadrika and Ian Wasseluk	Karl Hadrika	September 28, 2017	N/A
Things begin to mysteriously disappear around the Orlock Apartments; the gang follows clues to the mysterious Mr. Molesbee in Apartment 13.
29	29	"Puzzle Madness"	Maxwell Atoms	Matt Sullivan and Matt Whitlock	Matt Sullivan	September 28, 2017	N/A
Trapped in Bunnicula's evil puzzle box, Chester and Harold must solve three puzzles before they can escape.
30	30	"Return of the Curse of the Weredude"	Ian Wasseluk	Karl Hadrika and Ian Wasseluk	Karl Hadrika	September 28, 2017	N/A
Patches the Weredude enlists Chester to help him woo his girlfriend, but Chester falls for the same girl.
31	31	"Collar Me Crazy"	Eric Knutson	Joseph Adams and H. Caldwell Tanner	Joseph Adams	September 28, 2017	N/A
The pets are thrilled when a silver collar turns Bunnicula into a kindhearted, totally normal rabbit.
32	32	"Calendar Boys"	Erik Knutson	Darrick Bachman and Brandon Kruse	Brandon Kruse	September 28, 2017	N/A
Chester and Harold try to stop a pet calendar photo shoot that threatens to expose Bunnicula's vampire secret.
33	33	"Brussel Boy"	Matt Whitlock	H. Caldwell Tanner and Matt Whitlock	Matt Whitlock	September 28, 2017 (Boomerang SVOD); October 1, 2018 (Cartoon Network)	0.20 (Cartoon Network)
Mina's new friend, Russell, has a dark secret, and Bunnicula has to decide whether to help the poor lad or will he simply eat him.
34	34	"Vampire Tick"	Matt Whitlock	Jessica Borutski and Matt Whitlock	Lane Raichert	September 28, 2017	N/A
When a vampire tick attaches itself to Harold's butt, Bunnicula has to remove it before bad stuff goes down.
35	35	"Chestroldcula"	Matt Whitlock	Ben Joseph and Matt Whitlock	Edward Rivera	September 28, 2017	N/A
After a magical artifact combines Chester, Harold and Bunnicula into one uberpet, they must find a way to unmesh themselves.
36	36	"Never Been Scared"	Erik Knutson	Erin Kavanagh and Ian Wasseluk	Erin Kavanagh	September 28, 2017	N/A
When Mina wants to see a real ghost, her pets hire one to give her a little bit of a scare.
37	37	"Family Portrait"	Ian Wasseluk	Karl Hadrika, Erin Kavanagh, and Ian Wasseluk	Karl Hadrika and Erin Kavanagh	September 28, 2017	N/A
After an evil portrait swallows up Mina, her dad, and her friends, the pets must find a way to break the spell.
38	38	"My Imaginary Fiend"	Ian Wasseluk	Joseph Adams and Ian Wasseluk	Joseph Adams	September 28, 2017	N/A
Mina's imaginary friend returns to her life; Bunnicula is set on a collision course with a supernatural creature he has never had to face before.
39	39	"The Juicy Problem"	Maxwell Atoms	Maxwell Atoms	Maxwell Atoms	September 28, 2017 (Boomerang SVOD); October 1, 2018 (Cartoon Network)	0.20 (Cartoon Network)
Chester feeds Bunnicula mixed vegetable juices to get him to clean the house.
40	40	"Uninvited"	Ian Wasseluk	Maxwell Atoms and Erin Kavanagh	Erin Kavanagh	December 21, 2017	N/A
When Red Cap sets its sights on eating Mina, Marsha, and Becky for dinner, Bunnicula must save the day.

=== Season 2 (2017–18) ===
No. overall	No. in season	Title	Directed by	Written by	Storyboarded by	Original release date	U.S. viewers (millions)
Boomerang Streaming Service
41	1	"Three Heads Are Better Than One"	George Kaprielian	Maxwell Atoms	Hayley Foster	November 2, 2018 (Boomerang SVOD); March 8, 2018 (Boomerang)	N/A
Harold wants to prove that he can be responsible when he takes Cerberus' place as gatekeeper of the underworld, but it doesn't go too well.
42	2	"The Invisible Yam"	William Ruzicka	Maxwell Atoms	Antony Mazzotta	December 21, 2017	N/A
While Mina is away for the weekend, a depressed Bunnicula turns invisible after eating a very dry, rotten yam.
43	3	"Indistinguishable from Magic"	George Kaprielian and Shaunt Nigoghossian	Maxwell Atoms	Erin Kavanagh	December 21, 2017	N/A
Chester thinks Bunnicula is a robot made by aliens.
44	4	"Pranks for the Memories"	Andy Thom	Maxwell Atoms	Becks Wallace	December 21, 2017 (Boomerang SVOD); October 3, 2018 (Cartoon Network)	N/A
A prank war unfolds between Chester and Bunnicula.
45	5	"Revenge of the Return of the Curse of the Weredude"	George Kaprielian and Shaunt Nigoghossian	Maxwell Atoms	Joey Adams, Karina Gazizova, Matt Humpries, Matthew Peters, and Becks Wallace	December 21, 2017	N/A
When Patches decides to move in with Bunnicula and Harold, Chester knows that letting Mina's dad know about Patches' Were-Dude curse could be a problem.
46	6	"On Mina's Secret Service"	William Ruzicka	Maxwell Atoms	Todd DeJong and Raymond Santos	December 21, 2017	N/A
Harold must teach Chester how to be a 'secret service' animal if they are to rescue Bunnicula from some chipmunks, who have trapped him in their tree.
47	7	"Cellarmander"	George Kaprielian	Maxwell Atoms	Erin Kavanagh	December 21, 2017	N/A
A flooded basement means trouble for Bunnicula and the others when a Cellarmander eats them one by one. Together, Harold, Chester, Patches, and the Mumkey must rescue Bunnicula when he is eaten.
48	8	"The Eyes Have It"	William Ruzicka	Maxwell Atoms	Mariah-Rose McClaren	December 21, 2017	N/A
Bunnicula and the others traverse the sewers to retrieve Bunnicula's eye, but sewer mermaids won't make it easy.
49	9	"Chips and Salsa"	Andy Thom	Maxwell Atoms	Mariah-Rose McClaren	December 21, 2017	N/A
Mina and Marsha search the city for Bunnicula, who is having a party, so Harold and Chester try to locate him before Mina does.
50	10	"Mark of the Mandrake"	William Ruzicka	Maxwell Atoms	Antony Mazzotta	December 21, 2017	N/A
Bunnicula eats a mystical mandrake root and takes the size of a human.
51	11	"Down the Rabbit Hole"	Jessica Borutski	Maxwell Atoms	Hayley Foster	December 21, 2017 (Boomerang SVOD); October 3, 2018 (Cartoon Network)	N/A
Bunnicula helps a family of rabbits deal with a belligerent horse, who eats the rabbits of their carrots.
52	12	"Cat Burgled"	George Kaprielian	Maxwell Atoms	Erin Kavanagh	December 21, 2017	N/A
When Chester and the other Orlock apartment cats are trapped in a mysterious dimension by a human-hating ghost cat, Bunnicula and Harold must to rescue him.
53	13	"Goat Story"	George Kaprielian	Maxwell Atoms	Erin Kavanagh	December 21, 2017	N/A
Bunnicula's been framed for the crime of eating all the food in the fridge, so it's up to Chester and Harold to brush up on their detective skills and prove Bunnicula's innocence.
54	14	"Bunnicumoji"	William Ruzicka	Maxwell Atoms	Emi Yonemura	November 29, 2018	N/A
Bunnicula must travel into the world of text messaging to save an embarrassing message that Mina sent to Scott.
55	15	"Scott Free"	William Ruzicka	Maxwell Atoms	Emi Yonemura	March 8, 2018 (Boomerang); November 29, 2018 (Boomerang SVOD)	N/A
Bunnicula accidentally erases Scott's memory after the latter finds out about Bunnicula's secret, but also becomes rather intelligent. Chester and Harold use this to take advantage of Scott and make him cater to their every whim, but this also makes Mina miss the old Scott.
56	16	"Legend of the Lucky Locket"	George Kaprielian	Maxwell Atoms	Hayley Foster	September 26, 2018 (Boomerang SVOD)	N/A
The pets find a magical locket that shows them the future, and they also learn that Mina will be in mortal danger when she becomes an adult. They decide to train her to be ready for any possible dangers to keep her safe.
57	17	"Area 50 Bunn"	Andy Thom	Maxwell Atoms	Ernie Keen	March 10, 2018 (Boomerang); November 29, 2018 (Boomerang SVOD)	N/A
A government agent searches Orlock Apartments for supernatural activity in order to save his job.
58	18	"Bunn on a Plane"	Jessica Borutski	Maxwell Atoms	Mariah-Rose McClaren	March 11, 2018 (Boomerang); November 29, 2018 (Boomerang SVOD)	N/A
Bunnicula faces an ancient threat at 40,000 feet.
59	19	"Cat-aclysm"	William Ruzicka	Maxwell Atoms	Emi Yonemura	March 11, 2018 (Boomerang); November 29, 2018 (Boomerang SVOD)	N/A
Bunnicula absorbs some catnip and becomes an evil cat with the urge of destroying everything. It is up to Chester and the other cats to turn Bunnicula back to normal.
60	20	"Jurassicnicula"	Andy Thom	Maxwell Atoms	Emi Yonemura	March 12, 2018 (Boomerang); November 29, 2018 (Boomerang SVOD)	N/A
On a school field trip to the Natural History Museum, Bunnicula drains an ancient plant and his 'lizard brain' starts to take over.
61	21	"Bunzilla"	Andy Thom	Maxwell Atoms	Rafael Rosado and Rebecca Wallace	March 12, 2018 (Boomerang); November 29, 2018 (Boomerang SVOD)	N/A
Bunnicula absorbs a seaweed and gets transformed into a Godzilla-like creature whom a village of squirrels is scared of.
62	22	"The Chocolate Vampire Bunny"	William Ruzicka	Maxwell Atoms	Antony Mazzotta	March 14, 2018 (Boomerang); November 29, 2018 (Boomerang SVOD)	N/A
It is Easter, and when Bunnicula becomes chocolate after draining a cocoa bean, he is targeted by chocoholic children.
63	23	"Lord of the Lucky Locket"	George Kaprielian	Maxwell Atoms	Hayley Foster	September 26, 2018 (Boomerang SVOD)	N/A
The locket repairs itself and two ogres (John DiMaggio and Kevin Michael Richardson) decide to use it to capture Mina. It is up to Bunnicula to save the future.
64	24	"Bunderworld"	Andy Thom	Maxwell Atoms	Ernie Keen and Emi Yonemura	November 29, 2018	N/A
Patches explains his origins, and how he first encountered Bunnicula.
65	25	"The Gingerdread Man"	George Kaprielian	Maxwell Atoms	Erin Kavanagh	February 3, 2018; November 29, 2018 (Boomerang SVOD)	N/A
Chester and Bunnicula discover Harold is the king from a world entirely made of candy. Now they have to face its former king: The Gingerdread Man.
66	26	"Beach Blanket Bunn"	William Ruzicka	Maxwell Atoms	Antony Mazzotta and Emi Yonemura	November 29, 2018	N/A
Bunnicula (with Lugosi's special blend of beans used as a temporary sunblock) has an adventure at the beachside.
67	27	"The Curiosity Shop Killed the Cat"	Andy Thom	Maxwell Atoms	Ernie Keen	November 29, 2018	N/A
Madame Polodouri, thinking Chester is a Vampire Cat, kidnaps and exploits him along with three other animals.
68	28	"Bunn Vs."	George Kaprielian	Maxwell Atoms	Erin Kavanagh	November 29, 2018	N/A
Harold challenges Bunnicula to do about everything.
69	29	"Bunn in Space"	George Kaprielian	Maxwell Atoms	Brandon McKinney	November 29, 2018	N/A
After Bunnicula consumes a cabbage, he is shot into space and must find a way to make it back to Earth.
70	30	"Orlockdown"	Andy Thom	Maxwell Atoms	Brandon McKinney	November 29, 2018	N/A
When Count Orlock (the original vampire of the Orlock apartment) returns to take control of Bunnicula and rule the world, Chester and Harold must do everything to stop him.
71	31	"Prism Prison"	George Kaprielian	Maxwell Atoms	Hayley Foster	November 29, 2018	N/A
When Bunnicula, Chester, and Harold have vampire-dance-party, Prism-clad guardians take them to a vampire prison where other vampires both human and animal vampires alike are held.
72	32	"Lafitte's Lucky Locket"	Andy Thom	Maxwell Atoms	Becca Wallace	September 26, 2018 (Boomerang SVOD)	N/A
In this flashback episode, it is learned how Bunnicula helped Jean Lafitte defeat the British with their magical locket.
73	33	"A Dark and Stormy Night"	William Ruzicka	Maxwell Atoms	Antony Mazzotta	November 19, 2018 (Boomerang); November 29, 2018 (Boomerang SVOD)	N/A
Patches uses a magical pen to bring his stories to life, but it endangers the town.
74	34	"How The West Was Bunn"	Andy Thom	Maxwell Atoms	Becca Wallace	November 19, 2018 (Boomerang); November 29, 2018 (Boomerang SVOD)	N/A
Bunnicula must help the rabbit family defeat a ghost rat in a game of mini golf.
75	35	"Yellow Bellied Sound Sucker"	George Kaprielian	Maxwell Atoms	Hayley Foster	November 29, 2018	N/A
While playing with Bunnicula in the cellar, the pets accidentally release a peacock monster that can literally steal sounds out of the air. Unable to make a sound, the pets must stop the monster before it silences the world.
76	36	"The Fruit Fly"	William Ruzicka	Maxwell Atoms	Antony Mazzotta	November 29, 2018	N/A
When Bunnicula attempts to eat an apple as his first time to consume a fruit instead of a vegetable, he accidentally consumes a fly who lived inside the apple with a group of fruit flies and as a result, he starts turning into a Vampire Rabbit/Fly hybrid.
77	37	"Queen Wicked, the Wicked Queen"	George Kaprielian	Maxwell Atoms	Erin Kavanagh	November 29, 2018	N/A
After Bunnicula, Chester, and Harold escape an old Fairy Tale book, they accidentally bring with them the Wicked Queen from Snow White.
78	38	"Harold the Vampire Pointer"	William Ruzicka	Maxwell Atoms	Antony Mazzotta	October 29, 2017; November 29, 2018 (Boomerang SVOD)	N/A
When Fluffy the Vampire Pointer returns with a cold it is up to Harold and Bunnicula to stand in for her when a Vampire-Dog dares to challenge her.
79	39	"Blueberry Blues"	Andy Thom	Maxwell Atoms	Ernie Keen	November 29, 2018	N/A
Bunnicula becomes depressed after he sucks a blueberry dry.
80	40	"Iron Bunn"	William Ruzicka	Maxwell Atoms	Emi Yonemura	November 29, 2018	N/A
Bunnicula sucks a vegetable that had been burned by an iron pot, causing his body to become metallic (apart from that it can attract metal objects like a magnet).

=== Season 3 (2018) ===
No. overall	No. in season	Title	Directed by	Written by	Storyboarded by	Original release date	U.S. viewers (millions)
Boomerang Streaming Service
81	1	"Mastering the Genie"	George Kaprielian	Steve Clemmons	Hayley Foster	December 1, 2018 (Boomerang); March 28, 2019 (Boomerang SVOD)	N/A
A genie enjoys turning wishes into nightmares.
82	2	"Hare Club"	Andy Thom	Kyle Stafford	Antony Mazzotta	December 1, 2018 (Boomerang); March 28, 2019 (Boomerang SVOD)	N/A
After getting magically awesome hairstyles, the pets realize there is a price for beauty.
83	3	"The Maltese Bunny"	William Ruzicka	Jordan Gershowitz	Todd Dejong	December 4, 2018 (Boomerang); March 28, 2019 (Boomerang SVOD)	N/A
The pets use their detective skills to track down Mina's lost pony in the underworld.
84	4	"Termites!"	George Kaprielian	John Bailey Owen	Thomas Conner, Ryan Khatam, and Dan Root	December 4, 2018 (Boomerang); March 28, 2019 (Boomerang SVOD)	N/A
Chester's perfect day isn't all it is cracked up to be.
85	5	"Clone-icula"	Andy Thom	Steve Clemmons	Antony Mazzotta	December 7, 2018 (Boomerang); March 28, 2019 (Boomerang SVOD)	N/A
Bunnicula accidentally creates clones of himself and it is up to Chester and Harold to find a way to get rid of them.
86	6	"Hiccup in Smoke"	William Ruzicka	Jesse Porter	Todd Dejong	December 7, 2018 (Boomerang); March 28, 2019 (Boomerang SVOD)	N/A
Chester and Harold must get rid of Bunnicula's hiccups before it is too late.
87	7	"Purr-gatory"	George Kaprielian	Bryan Condon	Hayley Foster	December 10, 2018 (Boomerang); March 28, 2019 (Boomerang SVOD)	N/A
Bunnicula tries to resist the urge to scare Chester.
88	8	"Take the Bunny and Run"	Andy Thom	Merrill Hagan	Rafael Rosado	December 10, 2018 (Boomerang); March 28, 2019 (Boomerang SVOD)	N/A
Harold accidentally wins a dog race and the loser won't leave until he gets a rematch.
89	9	"Any Witch Way"	William Ruzicka	Dick Grunert	Mariah-Rose Marie	December 13, 2018 (Boomerang); March 28, 2019 (Boomerang SVOD)	N/A
A witch prevents Bunnicula from getting a hug from Mina.
90	10	"Up to Our Ears"	Andy Thom	Merrill Hagan	Rafael Rosado	December 13, 2018 (Boomerang); March 28, 2019 (Boomerang SVOD)	N/A
The pets must help Bunnicula get back his ears from a bunch of street gangs.
91	11	"Flunicula"	George Kaprielian	Carlos Ramos	Tom Conner	December 16, 2018 (Boomerang); March 28, 2019 (Boomerang SVOD)	N/A
Bunnicula has the flu and its up to Chester, Harold and Lugosi to find a cure for Bunnicula.
92	12	"So Campy"	William Ruzicka	Jordan Gershowitz	Rafael Rosado	December 16, 2018 (Boomerang); March 28, 2019 (Boomerang SVOD)	N/A
When the pets go on a camping trip, Harold tries to convince Chester why camping is fun.
93	13	"Wag the Dog"	George Kaprielian	Merill Hagan	Hayley Foster	December 18, 2018 (Boomerang); September 26, 2019 (Boomerang SVOD)	N/A
Harold's tail keeps getting him into trouble.
94	14	"Back in Thyme"	William Ruzicka	Jordan Gershowitz	Antony Mazzotta	December 18, 2018 (Boomerang); September 26, 2019 (Boomerang SVOD)	N/A
Bunnicula travels back in time to try and keep Mina's project from being destroyed.
95	15	"Hat-Cat"	Andy Thom	Kyle Stafford	Rafael Rosado	December 22, 2018 (Boomerang); September 26, 2019 (Boomerang SVOD)	N/A
Bunnicula gives Chester a magical hat of bravery.
96	16	"Poppet Master"	Andy Thom	Steve Clemmons	Mariah-Rose Marie	December 22, 2018 (Boomerang); September 26, 2019 (Boomerang SVOD)	N/A
Harold willingly creates puppet dolls of Chester, Bunnicula and himself, with dire consequences.
97	17	"The Party Animal"	William Ruzicka	Jordan Gershowitz	Todd Dejong	December 24, 2018 (Boomerang); September 26, 2019 (Boomerang SVOD)	N/A
Bunnicula enlists the help of a party expert in order to help loosen Chester up.
98	18	"Good Luck Cricket"	George Kaprielian	Dave Polsky	Thomas Connor	December 24, 2018 (Boomerang); September 26, 2019 (Boomerang SVOD)	N/A
A lucky cricket gives the pets good luck, but it comes at a price.
99	19	"Monster-Con"	William Ruzicka	Ethan Nicolle	Todd Dejong	December 26, 2018 (Boomerang); September 26, 2019 (Boomerang SVOD)	N/A
The pets go to a monster convention and realize Bunnicula's quite famous.
100	20	"Skin Deep"	George Kaprielian	Jesse Porter	Hayley Foster	December 26, 2018 (Boomerang); September 26, 2019 (Boomerang SVOD)	N/A
A monster scares the pets out of their skin.
101	21	"The Thingy"	Andy Thom	Dick Grunert	Rafael Rosado	December 28, 2018 (Boomerang); September 26, 2019 (Boomerang SVOD)	N/A
A doppelganger is on the loose in the Orlock Apartments.
102	22	"A Vampire at the Vet"	Andy Thom	Story by : Nick Reczynski; Teleplay by : Jordan Gershowitz	Rafael Rosado	December 28, 2018 (Boomerang); September 26, 2019 (Boomerang SVOD)	N/A
The pets try to get out of the Vet's office before they examine Bunnicula.
103	23	"Road Tripped"	William Ruzicka	Brady Klosterman	Antony Mazzotta	December 30, 2018 (Boomerang); September 26, 2019 (Boomerang SVOD)	N/A
The pets go on a road trip to a music festival in the underworld.
104	24	"Oh Brother!"	George Kaprielian	Jordan Gershowitz	Hayley Foster	December 30, 2018 (Boomerang); September 26, 2019 (Boomerang SVOD)	N/A
The ghosts and ghouls of the Orlock are spooked when a mysterious visitor appears and reveals a tie to Bunnicula's past.
