= The Misfits (novel) =

2001 novel by James Howe

The Misfits is a 2001 novel by James Howe. Published by Atheneum Books, the story follows four outcast seventh-graders who form a third-party political coalition, the "No-Name Party," during their middle school student council elections to combat bullying and name calling. The book is inspiring the creation of No Name-Calling Week, a national anti-bullying educational initiative launched in 2004 by GLSEN and Simon & Schuster. It got sequels, Totally Joe (2005),

== Plot ==
In the fictional town of Paintbrush Falls, twelve-year-old Bobby Goodspeed and his three best friends are routinely bullied. Later, they formed a group called the "Gang of Five." Motivated by the verbal harassment that they face, the group forms the "No-Name Party" to run in their seventh-grade student council elections. During the campaign, the friends confront their personal insecurities, culminating in the typically quiet Bobby delivering a powerful speech against derogatory labels. While they lose the election, their message resonates deeply; the principal establishes an annual "No-Name Day" to honor their cause. The story concludes with an epilogue showing the four friends' successful future.

== Reception ==
The Misfits received positive reviews from critics. Publishers Weekly described the novel as "hilarious and poignant," praising its message of encouraging young adults to celebrate their individuality.Kirkus reviews Highlighting the book's highly relatable on "12-year-old ways", Kirkus Reviews noted that "readers of every stripe will find themselves here and laugh (or cringe) as they catch on". It continued with a sequel, Totally Joe, in 2005, which tells the story of Joe's gay character.

In 2004, the Gay, Lesbian and Straight Education Network (GLSEN) partnered with Simon & Schuster to formally establish "No Name-Calling Week." The initiative that seeks to eradicate bullying targeted at a student's physical appearance, personal background, behavior, and sexual orientation. As of 2005, the program involved 5,100 educators across 36 states and was endorsed by more than 40 major national organizations, notably the National Education Association (NEA) and the Girl Scouts.

In 2023, the book was banned by school administrators in Texas because of its LGBT content.
