= Bunnicula: A Rabbit-Tale of Mystery =

1979 novel by Deborah Howe and James Howe

- Author: Deborah Howe and James Howe
- Illustrator: Alan Daniel
- Series: Bunnicula
- Genre: Children's novel, humor, mystery, vampire fiction
- Publisher: Atheneum Books
- Publication date: April 1979
- Publication place: United States
- Media type: Print (hardcover)
- Pages: 98 pp. (first edition)
- ISBN: 9780689307003
- OCLC: 680102206
- LC Class: PZ7.H836 Bu 1979

Bunnicula: A Rabbit-Tale of Mystery is a children's novel written by Deborah Howe and James Howe, illustrated by Alan Daniel, and published by Atheneum Books in 1979. It inaugurated the Bunnicula series. Based on a 2007 online poll, the National Education Association listed the novel as one of the "Teachers' Top 100 Books for Children". The series chronicles the adventures of the Monroe family and their pets, Harold the dog, Chester the cat, and Bunnicula the rabbit. The novels are narrated by Harold the family dog.

Deborah Howe died in June 1978, about ten months before the book was released, and James Howe wrote the sequels alone. It has been reissued numerous times, perhaps all with the original illustrations by Alan Daniel.

According to publisher Simon & Schuster sometime before 2002, James Howe dreamed up "a vampire rabbit named Bunnicula" in the mid-1970s and he thinks he was inspired by "movie versions of Dracula". Deborah suggested that he write a children's book.

== Plot summary ==
The novel introduces the Monroes, including the boys, Pete and Toby, as they return home from the movies on a dark and stormy night. Harold, the dog, notices that they return with a small bundle. The bundle turns out to be a rabbit they found at the theater, with a note tied around his neck written in an ancient Carpathian dialect. The rabbit has two tiny fangs and a black pattern on his back that looks like a cape. After some discussion the family decides to adopt him, and since they found him at the movie Dracula they decide to name him Bunnicula.

Shortly after adopting Bunnicula, the family notices vegetables mysteriously turning white. Chester, the cat, notices that in each of the vegetables there are two tiny holes. After reading a book on vampires, a jealous Chester becomes convinced that Bunnicula is a vampire. He notes that Bunnicula sleeps all day, appears to be able to get out of his cage on his own, and has tiny fangs, which Chester believes he uses to suck vegetables dry. Chester then convinces Harold to help him prove this by catching Bunnicula in the act. He strews himself, and Bunnicula's cage with garlic. This succeeds only in causing Mrs. Monroe to give him a bath. Later, after reading about killing vampires with a stake through the heart, Chester tries to punch a (meat) steak through the sleeping rabbit's heart. It doesn't do anything but confuse the poor rabbit, since it is just steak/meat. Finally, he tries to drown the rabbit by tossing his water dish on him. This behavior results in Chester being locked outside.

As the story progresses Harold refuses to cooperate in Chester's antics. With Chester no longer speaking to him, he begins to take a liking to Bunnicula. After a few days he notices that Bunnicula is beginning to look ill. He stays up late one night and discovers that Chester is putting on garlic and blocking Bunnicula from feeding, essentially starving the poor rabbit. Harold decides to act, and that evening before Chester awakes he takes Bunnicula out of his cage and places him in the family's dinner salad. Before the rabbit can feast Chester chases him off, and lands in the salad himself. Finally fed up with Chester's behavior, Harold confronts his friend and exposes him by barking loudly, alerting the entire family. At this point the family decides to take Chester to the vet to address his strange behavior. They also decide to take Bunnicula to the vet as they notice he seems ill. At the vet Chester is prescribed cat therapy. Bunnicula is put on a diet of vegetable juice. He takes to this so well, that the family decides to keep him on it permanently, at which point the mysterious white vegetables stop turning up. The Monroes, however, attribute the strange white vegetables to a vegetable blight at their supermarket, and change stores. The novel ends with the Monroes remaining blissfully unaware of Bunnicula's strange feeding habits, and the danger Chester believes them to be in.
