= James Howe =

American children's writer

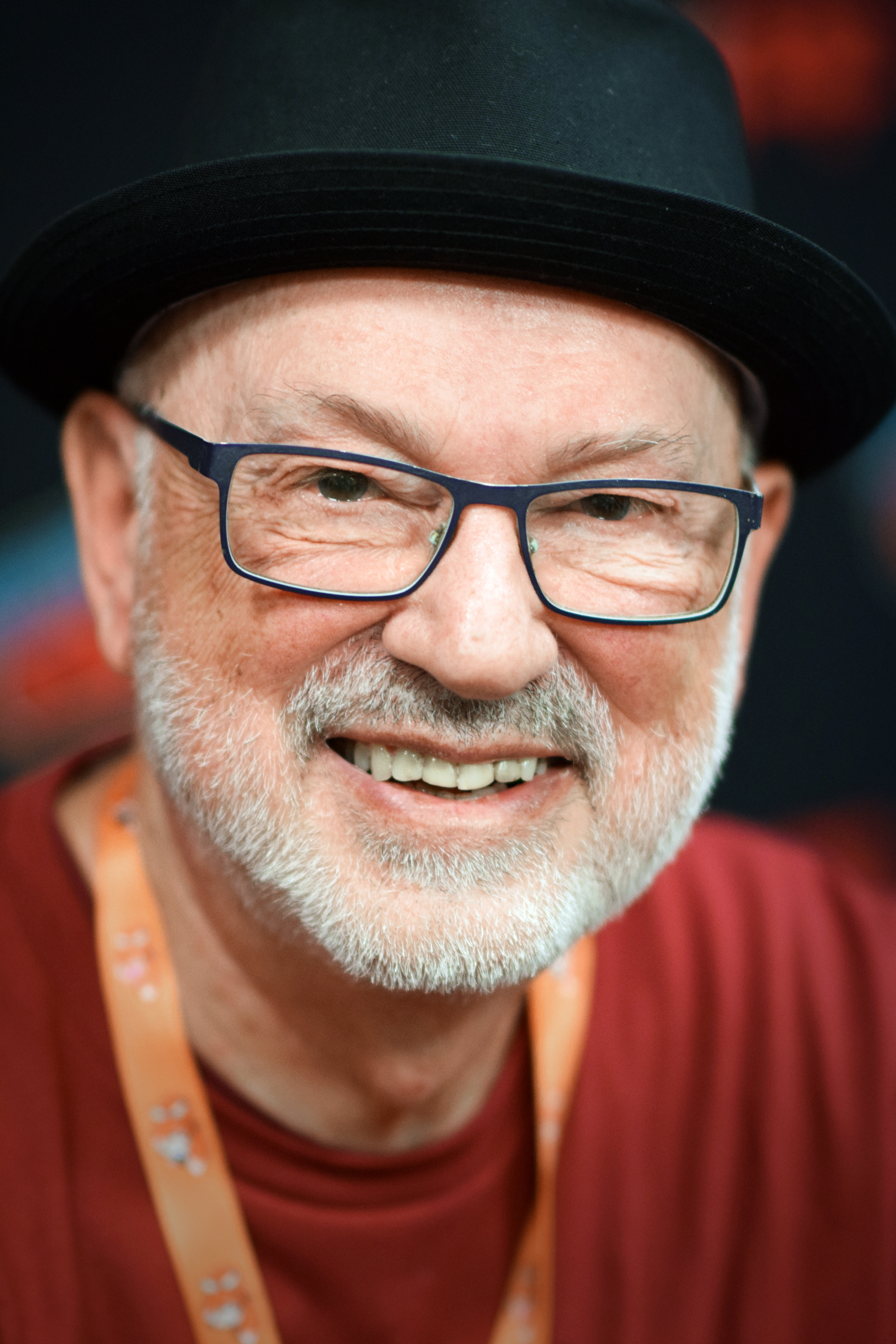
- Howe in 2022
- Born: August 2, 1946 (age 80); Oneida, New York, U.S.
- Occupation: Writer
- Spouses: Deborah Howe (m. 1969; died 1978) Mark Davis (m. 2011)
- Children: 1
- Writing career
- Genres: Juvenile fiction, picture books, young adult fiction, Horror

James Howe (born August 2, 1946) is an American children's writer who has written more than 79 juvenile and young adult fiction books. He is best known for the Bunnicula series about a vampire rabbit that sucks the juice out of vegetables.

== Biography ==
Howe was born in Oneida, New York. At the age of nine or ten, Howe wrote a play based on the "Blondie" comic strip as well as a variety of short stories and self-published newspapers. Of the latter his favorite is The Gory Gazette which he made for a self-founded club, Vampire Legion.

Howe continued to write plays during his theater studies at Boston University, and eventually moved to New York City to pursue a career as an actor and model while directing plays and working as a literary agent.

In the mid-1970s, Howe's mother-in-law encouraged him and his wife, Deborah Howe, to create a children's story based on a character the two had created while watching older Dracula movies, which at the time were played late at night on TVs. With his wife, he created Bunnicula: A Rabbit Tale of Mystery, about a pet rabbit suspected of being a vampire. The book went on to win more than ten Children's Choice awards, including the Dorothy Canfield Fisher Award and the Nene Award, and eventually evolved into a series. Ten months before Bunnicula was published Deborah died, inspiring the creation of The Hospital Book.

In 1981, Howe began writing full-time. In addition to the Bunnicula series, Howe has written picture books, children's novels, nonfiction, adaptations of classic stories, and screenplays for movies and television. In 1997, he published his first young adult novel, The Watcher. The Misfits, itself inspired by his child’s difficult experiences in middle school, was the inspiration behind GLSEN's annual No Name-Calling Week.

After the death of his first wife, Howe remarried and had one child. Howe and his second wife divorced after Howe came out as gay. In 2007, James Howe was the recipient of The E.B. White Read Aloud Award for Picture Books for his book Houndsley and Catina, illustrated by Marie-Louise Gay, and published by Candlewick Press.

On September 17, 2011, Howe married Mark Davis, a lawyer.

Howe was a consulting producer for the animated adaptation of the books.

== Bibliography ==
- Teddy Bear's Scrapbook, Deborah and James Howe, illustrated by David S. Rose (Atheneum Books, 1980), OCLC 5564508
- The Hospital Book (1981)
- A Night without Stars (1983)
- The Day the Teacher Went Bananas (1984)
- How the Ewoks Saved the Trees: An Old Ewok Legend (1984) - based on the Ewoks from Star Wars: Return of the Jedi
- Morgan's Zoo (1984)
- Mr. Tinker in Oz (1985) - based on the mythology of L. Frank Baum's Wizard of Oz series
- Babes in Toyland (1986)
- I Wish I Were a Butterfly (1987) - Illustrated by Ed Young
- Dances with Wolves: A Story for Children (1991) - featuring photographs by Ben Glass, based on the book and film Dances with Wolves written by Michael Blake
- The Secret Garden: A Stepping Stone Book (1993) – adaptation of the 1911 classic by Frances Hodgson Burnett
- When You Go to Kindergarten (1994)
- The New Nick Kramer, or My Life as a Baby-sitter (1995)
- The Watcher (1997)
- Kaddish for Grandpa in Jesus' Name Amen (2004)

=== The Misfits series ===
- The Misfits (1998)
- Totally Joe (2005)
- Addie on the Inside (2011)
- Also Known as Elvis (2014)
- The Misfits Collection (2015)

=== Bunnicula series ===
Audiobook versions were also released featuring narrators Victor Garber and Patrick Mulvihill.

- Bunnicula: A Rabbit-Tale of Mystery, Deborah and James Howe, illustrated by Alan Daniel (Atheneum, 1979); numerous editions including 25th Anniversary Edition
- Howliday Inn (1982)
- The Celery Stalks at Midnight (1983)
- Nighty-Nightmare (1987)
- Return to Howliday Inn (1992)
- Bunnicula Strikes Again! (1999)
- Bunnicula Meets Edgar Allan Crow! (2006)

==== Harold and Chester oversized picture books ====
All illustrated by Leslie H. Morrill (except Rabbit-Cadabra! which was illustrated by Alan Daniel).

- The Fright Before Christmas (1988)
- Scared Silly: A Halloween Treat (1988)
- Hot Fudge (1991)
- Creepy-Crawly Birthday (1992)
- Rabbit-Cadabra! (1993)
- A Book of 3 Spooky Plays - Play versions of Creepy-Crawly Birthday, The Fright Before Christmas, and Scared Silly: A Halloween Treat

==== Tales from the House of Bunnicula series ====
All illustrated by Brett Helquist. Audiobook versions of many titles in this series were released featuring narrator Joe Grifasi.

- It Came From Beneath the Bed! (2002)
- Invasion of the Mind Swappers from Asteroid 6! (2002)
- Howie Monroe and the Doghouse of Doom (2003)
- Screaming Mummies of the Pharaoh's Tomb II (2003)
- Bud Barkin, Private Eye (2004)
- The Odorous Adventures of Stinky Dog (2003)
- Tales From the House of Bunnicula: Writing Journal (a blank journal featuring artwork by Brett Helquist)

==== Bunnicula and Friends a Ready-To-Read series ====
Many of these titles are re-workings of previously released Bunnicula books rewritten by James Howe for younger readers and featuring new illustrations by Jeff Mack.

- The Vampire Bunny (2004)
- Hot Fudge (2004)
- Scared Silly (2004)
- Rabbit-Cadabra (2006)
- The Fright Before Christmas (2006)
- Creepy Crawly Birthday (2005)

==== Bunnicula pop-up book ====
One Bunnicula related pop-up book was released. It features a unique story and it is illustrated by Alan Daniel and Lea Daniel.

- Bunnicula Escapes!: A Pop-up Adventure (1994)

==== Bunnicula activity, fact, and joke books ====
All illustrated by Alan Daniel.

- Bunnicula's Wickedly Wacky Word Games: a Book for Word Lovers & Their Pencils! (1998)
- Bunnicula's Frightfully Fabulous Factoids: a Book to Entertain Your Brain! (1999)
- Bunnicula's Pleasantly Perplexing Puzzlers: A Book of Puzzles, Mazes, & Whatzits! (1999)
- Bunnicula's Long-lasting Laugh-alouds: a Book of Jokes & Riddles to Tickle Your Bunny-Bone! (1999)

=== Pinky and Rex series ===
All illustrated by Melissa Sweet.

- Pinky and Rex (1990)
- Pinky and Rex Get Married (1990)
- Pinky and Rex and the Spelling Bee (1991)
- Pinky and Rex and the Mean Old Witch (1991)
- Pinky and Rex Go To Camp (1992)
- Pinky and Rex and the New Baby (1993)
- Pinky and Rex and the Double-dad Weekend (1995)
- Pinky and Rex and the Bully (1996)
- Pinky and Rex and the New Neighbors (1997)
- Pinky and Rex and the School Play (1998)
- Pinky and Rex and the Perfect Pumpkin (1998)
- Pinky and Rex and the Just-right Pet (2001)

=== Sebastian Barth Mystery series ===
- What Eric Knew (1985)
- Eat your Poison, Dear (1986)
- Stage Fright (1986)
- Dew Drop Dead (1990)

=== There's a series ===
- There's a Monster Under My Bed (1986)
- There's a Dragon in My Sleeping Bag (1994)

=== Horace and Morris (and Dolores) series ===
All illustrated by Amy Walrod.

- Horace and Morris, but Mostly Dolores (1999)
- Horace and Morris Join the Chorus, but What About Dolores (2002)
- Horace and Morris Say Cheese (Which Makes Dolores Sneeze!) (2009)

=== Houndsley and Catina series ===
All illustrated by Marie-Louise Gay.

- Houndsley and Catina (2006)
- Houndsley and Catina and the Birthday Surprise (2007)
- Houndsley and Catina and the Quiet Time (2008)
- Houndsley and Catina Plink and Plunk (2009)

=== The Muppets books ===
Book based on Jim Henson's Muppets and Muppet Babies:

- The Case of the Missing Mother, illustrated by William Cleaver (Random House, 1983)
- The Muppet Guide to Magnificent Manners, illus. Peter Elwell (Random House, 1984)
- A Love Note for Baby Piggy, illus. Kathy Spahr (Weekly Reader, 1986)

=== Anthologies edited ===
- It's Heaven to be Seven (2000), eds. Roald Dahl, Beverly Cleary, Patricia MacLachlan, and Howe
- The Color of Absence: 12 Stories About Loss and Hope (2001)
- 13: Thirteen Stories That Capture the Agony and Ecstasy of Being Thirteen (2003)
