= Deborah Howe =

American children's writer (1946–1978)

- Born: August 12, 1946 Boston, Massachusetts, US
- Died: June 3, 1978 (aged 31)
- Occupation: Writer
- Genre: Juvenile fiction, young adult fiction, horror
- Spouse: James Howe (m. 1969)

Deborah Smith Howe (August 12, 1946 – June 3, 1978) was an American children's writer and actress. She and her husband James Howe wrote two books, Bunnicula: A Rabbit-Tale of Mystery and Teddy Bear's Scrapbook, but she died of cancer at age 31 before they were published in 1979 and 1980, respectively.

Deborah Smith was born in Boston, Massachusetts on August 12, 1946. Her father was Lester Smith, a radio newscaster in New York. She was raised in Chelsea, Massachusetts. In 1968, she graduated from Boston University with a B.F.A. in theater. At college, she met James Howe, another student studying acting. They married on September 28, 1969, and then together, they moved to New York City for their acting careers. She played in off-Broadway shows, working as an actress from 1969 to 1978.

Howe also worked as a model and tape recording artist, and she and her husband created children's records.

In 1978, Deborah and James Howe wrote Bunnicula and Teddy Bear's Scrapbook while Deborah was staying at St. Vincent's Hospital and Medical Center due to her illness. Her husband stated "writing the books became a form of therapy" for them while they were staying at the hospital, since the books were "humorous and they gave us laughter in writing them." She was diagnosed with ameloblastoma, a tumor-forming bone disease, and died 11 months after her diagnosis on June 3, 1978. A children's library at St. Vincent's was later named after her.

== Awards ==
Howe's work has won the following awards:

- AL Notable Children's Books
- CCBC Choices (Cooperative Children's Book Council)
- Dorothy Canfield Fisher Children's Book Award (VT)
- Emphasis on Reading Book Award (AL)
- Golden Sower Award (NE)
- Iowa Children's Choice Award
- IRA/CBC Children's Choices
- Land of Enchantment Children's Book Award (NM)
- Nene Award (HI)
- Pacific Northwest Young Reader's Choice Award
- Sequoyah Children's Book Award (OK)
- South Carolina Book Award
- Sunshine State Young Readers Award (FL)
