= List of Nickelodeon Animation Studios productions =

This article contains a list of productions made by Nickelodeon Animation Studios. This list includes animated television series, shorts, specials, and other projects.

== Television series ==
=== Original series ===
#	Title	Creator(s) / Developer(s)	Year(s)	Co-production(s)	Network	Notes
1990s
1	Doug	Jim Jinkins (d): Jim Jinkins, David Campbell, and Joe Aaron	1991–94	Jumbo Pictures; Ellipse Programmé	Nickelodeon	Seasons 1–4 only; Disney acquired the series in 1996 and produced three more seasons, which aired on ABC.
2	Rugrats	Arlene Klasky, Gábor Csupó, and Paul Germain	1991–2004	Klasky Csupo	Nickelodeon	
3	The Ren & Stimpy Show	John Kricfalusi (d): John Kricfalusi, Bob Camp, Jim Smith and Lynne Naylor	1991–96	Spümcø (seasons 1–2)	Nickelodeon (1991–95); MTV (1996)	Oversaw the production of seasons 1–2, directly produced seasons 3–5 and credited as Games Animation Inc.
4	Rocko's Modern Life	Joe Murray	1993–96	Joe Murray Productions	Nickelodeon	Credited as Games Animation Inc.
5	Aaahh!!! Real Monsters	Gábor Csupó and Peter Gaffney	1994–97	Klasky Csupo	Nickelodeon	Credited as Games Animation Inc.
6	Hey Arnold!	Craig Bartlett (d): Craig Bartlett, Joe Ansolabehere, and Steve Viksten	1996–2004	Snee-Oosh, Inc.	Nickelodeon	Credited as Games Animation Inc. for the first two seasons.
7	The Angry Beavers	Mitch Schauer (d): Mitch Schauer and Keith Kaczorek	1997–2006	Gunther-Wahl Productions, Inc.	Nickelodeon (1997–2003); Nicktoons (2006)	Credited as Games Animation Inc. for season 1 and Nicktoons for rest of its run.
8	CatDog	Peter Hannan	1998–2005	Peter Hannan Productions	Nickelodeon (1998–2004); Nicktoons (2004–05)	
9	The Wild Thornberrys	Arlene Klasky, Gábor Csupó, Steve Pepoon, David Silverman, and Stephen Sustarsic	1998–2004	Klasky Csupo	Nickelodeon	
10	SpongeBob SquarePants	Stephen Hillenburg (d): Derek Drymon, Tim Hill, and Nick Jennings	1999–present	United Plankton Pictures	Nickelodeon (1999–present); Nicktoons (2002; 2023–24; 2026)	
11	Rocket Power	Arlene Klasky and Gábor Csupó (d): Victor Wilson, Eryk Casemiro, Michael Bloom and Andy McElfresh	1999–2004	Klasky Csupo	Nickelodeon	
2000s
12	As Told by Ginger	Emily Kapnek (d): Kate Boutilier and Eryk Casemiro	2000–06	Klasky Csupo	Nickelodeon (2000–04); Nicktoons (2004–06)	
13	The Fairly OddParents	Butch Hartman	2001–17	Frederator Incorporated; Billionfold Inc. (seasons 6–10)	Nickelodeon (2001–16); Nicktoons (2017)	
14	Invader Zim	Jhonen Vasquez	2001–06		Nickelodeon (2001–02); Nicktoons (2006)	
15	Action League Now!	Robert Mittenthal, Will McRobb, and Albie Hecht	2001–02	Flying Mallet, Inc. Chuckimation	Nickelodeon	Spin-off of KaBlam!.
16	ChalkZone	Bill Burnett and Larry Huber	2002–08	Frederator Incorporated	Nickelodeon	
17	The Adventures of Jimmy Neutron, Boy Genius	John A. Davis	2002–06	O Entertainment; DNA Productions	Nickelodeon	Follow-up to Jimmy Neutron: Boy Genius. First CGI series
18	All Grown Up!	Arlene Klasky, Gábor Csupó, and Paul Germain (original characters) (d): Kate Boutilier, Eryk Casemiro, and Monica Piper	2003–08	Klasky Csupo	Nickelodeon	Spin-off of Rugrats.
19	My Life as a Teenage Robot	Rob Renzetti (d): Rob Renzetti, Alex Kirwan, Joseph Holt, Jill Friemark, and Dan Krall	2003–09	Frederator Incorporated	Nickelodeon (2003–05); Nicktoons (2008–09)	
20	Danny Phantom	Butch Hartman (d): Steve Marmel	2004–07	Billionfold Inc.	Nickelodeon	
21	Avatar: The Last Airbender	Michael Dante DiMartino and Bryan Konietzko	2005–08		Nickelodeon	
22	Catscratch	Doug TenNapel	2005–07		Nickelodeon	Loosely based on the comic Gear.
23	The X's	Carlos Ramos	2005–06		Nickelodeon	
24	El Tigre: The Adventures of Manny Rivera	Sandra Equihua and Jorge R. Gutierrez	2007–08	Mexopolis	Nickelodeon (2007–08); Nicktoons (2008)	
25	Tak and the Power of Juju	Avalanche Entertainment (original video game series) (d): Jed Spingarn, Nick Jennings, and Mitch Watson	2007–09	THQ	Nickelodeon	Based on the video game series of the same name.
26	Back at the Barnyard	Steve Oedekerk	2007–11	Omation Animation Studio	Nickelodeon (2007–10); Nicktoons (2011)	Follow-up to Barnyard.
27	The Mighty B!	Amy Poehler, Cynthia True, and Erik Wiese	2008–11	Paper Kite Productions; Polka Dot Pictures	Nickelodeon (2008–10); Nicktoons (2010–11)	
28	Making Fiends	Amy Winfrey	2008		Nicktoons	Miniseries based on the web series of the same name.
29	The Penguins of Madagascar	Tom McGrath and Eric Darnell (original characters) (d): Mark McCorkle and Bob Schooley	2008–15	DreamWorks Animation	Nickelodeon (2008–12); Nicktoons (2013–15)	Based on Madagascar franchise.
30	Fanboy & Chum Chum	Eric Robles	2009–14	Frederator Studios	Nickelodeon (2009–12); Nicktoons (2014)	
2010s
31	Planet Sheen	Keith Alcorn and Steve Oedekerk (d): Steven Banks	2010–13	Omation Animation Studio	Nickelodeon (2010–11); Nicktoons (2012–13)	Spin-off of The Adventures of Jimmy Neutron, Boy Genius and Jimmy Neutron: Boy Genius.
32	T.U.F.F. Puppy	Butch Hartman	2010–15	Billionfold Inc.	Nickelodeon (2010–13); Nicktoons (2013–15)	
33	Winx Club (revival)	Iginio Straffi	2011–16	Rainbow S.p.A.	Nickelodeon (2011–14); Nick Jr. Channel (2014–16)	Seasons 5–7 and four specials were co-produced in-house at Nick Animation.
34	Kung Fu Panda: Legends of Awesomeness	Ethan Reiff and Cyrus Voris (original characters) (d): Peter Hastings	2011–16	DreamWorks Animation	Nickelodeon (2011–14); Nicktoons (2016)	Based on Kung Fu Panda.
35	The Legend of Korra	Bryan Konietzko and Michael Dante DiMartino	2012–14	Ginormous Madman	Nickelodeon (2012–14); Nick.com (2014)	Sequel to Avatar: The Last Airbender.
36	Robot and Monster	Dave Pressler, Joshua Sternin, and J.R. Ventimilia	2012–15	Smasho! Productions; Lowbar Productions	Nickelodeon (2012); Nicktoons (2013–15); Noggin (app) (2015)	
37	Teenage Mutant Ninja Turtles (reboot)	Kevin Eastman and Peter Laird (original characters) (d): Ciro Nieli, Joshua Sternin, and J.R. Ventimilia	2012–17	Lowbar Productions	Nickelodeon (2012–17); Nicktoons (2017)	Reboot of 1987 series.
38	Monsters vs. Aliens	Conrad Vernon and Rob Letterman (original characters) (d): Mark McCorkle, Bob Schooley and Bret Haaland	2013–14	DreamWorks Animation	Nickelodeon	Based on franchise of the same name. Distributed by 20th Century Fox Television. Currently distributed by NBCUniversal Syndication Studios.
39	Sanjay and Craig	Jim Dirschberger, Jay Howell, and Andreas Trolf	2013–16	Forest City Rockers	Nickelodeon	
40	Breadwinners	Steve Borst and Gary "Doodles" DiRaffaele	2014–16		Nickelodeon (2014–15); Nicktoons (2016)	
41	Harvey Beaks	C. H. Greenblatt	2015–17		Nickelodeon (2015–16); Nicktoons (2017)	
42	Pig Goat Banana Cricket	Dave Cooper and Johnny Ryan	2015–18		Nickelodeon (2015–16); Nicktoons (2016–18)	
43	The Loud House	Chris Savino	2016–present		Nickelodeon (2016–present); Nicktoons (2023; 2025); TeenNick (2025); Paramount+ (2026)	
44	Bunsen Is a Beast	Butch Hartman	2017–18	Billionfold Inc.	Nickelodeon (2017); Nicktoons (2017–18)	
45	Welcome to the Wayne	Billy Lopez	2017–19	Yowza! Animation	Nickelodeon (2017); Nicktoons (2018–19)	Based on the web series of the same name. Produced by the New York studio.
46	The Adventures of Kid Danger	Dan Schneider	2018	Powerhouse Animation Studios; Schneider's Bakery	Nickelodeon	Animated spin-off of Henry Danger. Final series produced in association with Schneider's Bakery.
47	Rise of the Teenage Mutant Ninja Turtles	Kevin Eastman and Peter Laird (original characters) (d): Andy Suriano and Ant Ward	2018–20		Nickelodeon (2018–19); Nicktoons (2019–20)	Second reboot of 1987 series.
48	Pinky Malinky	Chris Garbutt and Rikke Asbjoern	2019		Netflix	Originated as a Cartoon Network-rejected pilot. Originally planned to air on Nickelodeon, it was later released on Netflix.
49	Middle School Moguls	Gina Heitkamp and Jenae Heitkamp	2019	Gengirl Media, Inc.	Nickelodeon	Miniseries.
50	The Casagrandes	Chris Savino and Miguel Puga (original characters) (d): Michael Rubiner and Miguel Puga	2019–22		Nickelodeon (2019–22); Nicktoons (2021)	Spin-off of The Loud House.
2020s
51	It's Pony	Ant Blades	2020–22	Blue Zoo Animation Studio	Nickelodeon (2020); Nicktoons (2021–22)	
52	Glitch Techs	Eric Robles and Dan Milano	2020		Netflix	Originally planned to air on Nickelodeon, it was later released on Netflix.
53	Kamp Koral: SpongeBob's Under Years	Stephen Hillenburg (original characters) (d): Vincent Waller, Marc Ceccarelli, Mr. Lawrence, Kaz, Luke Brookshier and Andrew Goodman	2021–24	United Plankton Pictures	Paramount+ Nickelodeon	Spin-off SpongeBob SquarePants. Released on Paramount+ and later on Nickelodeon.
54	Rugrats (reboot)	Arlene Klasky, Gábor Csupó and Paul Germain	2021–26	Klasky Csupo	Paramount+ (2021–23); Nickelodeon (2021–23); Nicktoons (2024); Nickelodeon Global (2026)	Reboot of 1991 series. Released on Paramount+ and later on Nickelodeon.
55	The Patrick Star Show	Stephen Hillenburg (original characters) (d): Luke Brookshier, Marc Ceccarelli, Andrew Goodman, Kaz, Mr. Lawrence and Vincent Waller	2021–present	United Plankton Pictures	Nickelodeon	Second spin-off of SpongeBob SquarePants.
56	Middlemost Post	John Trabbic III (d): Dave H. Johnson and John Trabbic III	2021–22		Nickelodeon	
57	Star Trek: Prodigy	Gene Roddenberry (original series) Kevin and Dan Hageman	2021–24	Secret Hideout; Roddenberry Entertainment; Brothers Hageman Productions; CBS Eye Animation Productions	Paramount+ (2021–22); Nickelodeon (2021–22); Netflix (2024)	Based on the Star Trek franchise. Released on Paramount+ and later on Nickelodeon for season 1.
58	Big Nate	Lincoln Peirce (original characters) (d): Mitch Watson	2022–24	John Cohen Productions	Paramount+ Nickelodeon (2022–23); Nicktoons (2024)	Based on the comic strip series of the same name. Released on Paramount+ and later on Nickelodeon.
59	Monster High	Garrett Sander (original characters); Mattel (toyline) (d): Shea Fontana	2022–24	Mattel Television	Nickelodeon	Based on the toyline of the same.
60	Transformers: EarthSpark	Hasbro (toyline) (d): Dale Malinowski, Ant Ward and Nicole Dubuc	2022–25	Entertainment One (season 1); Hasbro Entertainment (seasons 2–4)	Paramount+ Nickelodeon (2022–25); Nicktoons (2025–26)	Based on the toyline of the same name.
61	Rock Paper Scissors	Kyle Stegina and Josh Lehrman	2024–26		Nickelodeon	
62	The Fairly OddParents: A New Wish	Butch Hartman (original characters) (d): Daniel Abramovici, Ashleigh Crystal Hairston, Lindsay Katai and Dave Stone	2024	FredFilms; Billionfold Inc.	Nickelodeon	Follow-up to The Fairly OddParents.
63	Tales of the Teenage Mutant Ninja Turtles	Kevin Eastman and Peter Laird (original characters) (d): Christopher Yost and Alan Wan	2024–25	Point Grey Pictures	Paramount+	Follow-up to the film Teenage Mutant Ninja Turtles: Mutant Mayhem. Released on Paramount+ and later on Nickelodeon.
64	Max & the Midknights	Lincoln Pierce (original characters) (d): Sharon Flynn and David Skelly	2024–26	Jane Startz Productions	Nickelodeon (2024–25); Nicktoons (2025); TeenNick (2026)	Based on the children's book series of the same name.
65	Wylde Pak	Paul Watling and Kyle Marshall	2025–present		Nickelodeon (2025–present); TeenNick (2025)	
66	Avatar: Seven Havens	Michael Dante DiMartino and Bryan Konietzko (d): Sehaj Sethi	2026–present	Avatar Studios; Ginormous Madman	Paramount+	Sequel to The Legend of Korra.
Upcoming
67	Garfield	TBA	December 11, 2026	Paws, Inc.	Paramount+	Based on the comic strip of the same name.
68	Avatar Kuruk: Wave of Chaos	Bryan Konietzko	TBA	Avatar Studios	Paramount+	Prequel to Avatar: The Last Airbender.

=== Anthology series ===
#	Title	Creator	Years	Co-production(s)	Network	Notes
68	KaBlam!	Robert Mittenthal, Will McRobb, and Chris Viscardi	1996–2000	Flying Mallet, Inc. (season 4)	Nickelodeon	
69	Oh Yeah! Cartoons	Fred Seibert	1998–2002	Frederator Incorporated	Nickelodeon	
70	Nicktoons Film Festival	Fred Seibert	2004–09	Frederator Incorporated	Nicktoons	
71	Random! Cartoons	Fred Seibert	2008–09	Frederator Incorporated	Nicktoons	

=== Preschool Shows ===
#	Title	Creator(s) / Developer(s)	Years	Co-production(s)	Network	Notes
1990s
72	Blue's Clues	Traci Paige Johnson, Todd Kessler, and Angela Santomero	1996–2006	Out of the Blue Enterprises (uncredited)	Nickelodeon	Produced by Nick Digital.
73	Little Bill	Bill Cosby and Varnette P. Honeywood (original books and illustrations) (d): Fracaswell Hyman	1999–2004	Smiley, Inc. (uncredited)	Nickelodeon	Produced by Nick Digital.
2000s
74	Dora the Explorer	Chris Gifford, Valerie Walsh Valdes, and Eric Weiner	2000–19		Nickelodeon (2000–19); Noggin (2004); Nick Jr. Channel (2019)	Co-produced with the New York studio.
75	Oswald	Dan Yaccarino (d): Lisa Eve Hubman and Dan Yaccarino	2001–03	HIT Entertainment	Nickelodeon	
76	Blue's Room	Traci Paige Johnson and Angela Santomero	2004–07	Out of the Blue Enterprises (uncredited in season 1)	Nickelodeon	Produced by Nick Digital.
77	The Backyardigans	Janice Burgess	2004–13	Nelvana	Nickelodeon (2004–13); Noggin (2005); Nick Jr. Channel (2009–13)	
78	Go, Diego, Go!	Chris Gifford and Valerie Walsh Valdes	2005–13		Nickelodeon (2005–11); Nick Jr. Channel (2013)	Spin-off of Dora the Explorer. Co-produced with the New York studio.
79	Wonder Pets!	Josh Selig	2006–16	Little Airplane Productions	Nickelodeon (2006–10); Noggin (2009); Nick Jr. Channel (2010–16)	
80	Ni Hao, Kai-Lan	Karen Chau (d): Mary Harrington, Karen Chau, Judy Rothman, and Sascha Paladino	2008–11	Harringtoons Productions	Nickelodeon (2008–10); Nick Jr. Channel (2011)	
2010s
81	Team Umizoomi	Soo Kim, Michael T. Smith, and Jennifer Twomey	2010–15	Curious Pictures	Nickelodeon; Nick Jr. Channel	
82	Bubble Guppies	Jonny Belt and Robert Scull	2011–23	Wildbrain Entertainment (season 1); Nelvana (seasons 2–4); Jam Filled Toronto (seasons 5–6)	Nickelodeon	Co-produced with the New York studio.
83	Wallykazam!	Adam Peltzman	2014–17		Nickelodeon (2014–16); Nick Jr. Channel (2016–17)	Produced by the New York studio.
84	Dora and Friends: Into the City!	Chris Gifford and Valerie Walsh Valdes	2014–17		Nickelodeon (2014–16); Nick Jr. Channel (2015–17)	Second spin-off and sequel to Dora the Explorer. Produced by the New York studio.
85	Blaze and the Monster Machines	Jeff Borkin and Ellen Martin (d): Clark Stubbs, Jeff Borkin and Ellen Martin	2014–25	Nerd Corps Entertainment (season 1); WildBrain Studios (seasons 2–9)	Nickelodeon; Nick Jr. Channel	
86	Fresh Beat Band of Spies	Nadine van der Velde and Scott Kraft (d): Michael Ryan	2015–16	Nelvana; 6point2	Nickelodeon (2015); Nick Jr. Channel (2015–16)	Animated spin-off of The Fresh Beat Band.
87	Shimmer and Shine	Farnaz Esnaashari-Charmatz	2015–20		Nickelodeon (2015–18); Nick Jr. Channel (2018–20)	
88	Nella the Princess Knight	Christine Ricci	2017–21	Brown Bag Films	Nickelodeon (2017); Nick Jr. Channel (2018–19); Paramount+ (2021)	
89	Sunny Day	Abie Longstaff (d): Paula Rosenthal	2017–20	Pipeline Studios; Silvergate Media	Nickelodeon (2017–18); Nick Jr. Channel (2018–19); Amazon Prime Video (2020)	
90	Butterbean's Café	Jonny Belt and Robert Scull	2018–20	Brown Bag Films	Nickelodeon (2018–19); Nick Jr. Channel (2019-20)	Co-produced with the New York studio.
91	Blue's Clues & You!	Traci Paige Johnson, Todd Kessler, and Angela Santomero (d): Traci Paige Johnson and Angela Santomero	2019–24	9 Story Media Group; Brown Bag Films	Nickelodeon (2019–23); Nick Jr. Channel (2023–24); YouTube (2024)	Reboot of Blue's Clues.
2020s
92	Santiago of the Seas	Niki Lopez, Leslie Valdes, and Valerie Walsh Valdes	2020–23	Walsh Valdés Productions (season 1)	Nickelodeon (2020–23); Nick Jr. Channel (2023)	
93	Baby Shark's Big Show!	Pinkfong (d): Whitney Ralls, Gary "Doodles" DiRaffaele and Tommy Sica	2020–25	The Pinkfong Company; Pinkfong	Nickelodeon (2020–23); Nick Jr. Channel (2023–25)	
94	Face's Music Party	Nickelodeon (d): Jonas Morganstein and David Kleiler	2022–23	Jonas & Co.	Nickelodeon	
95	The Tiny Chef Show	Rachel Larsen, Adam Reid and Ozlem Akturk	2022–25	Imagine Kids+Family; Dunshire Productions; Factory (season 1); ShadowMachine (season 2–3); Tiny Chef Productions	Nickelodeon (2022–24); Nick Jr. Channel (2025)	
96	Bossy Bear	David Horvath and Sun-Min Kim (original characters) (d): Jason Hopley and Jeff D'Elia	2023–24	Imagine Kids+Family; Renegade Animation	Nickelodeon (2023–24); Nick Jr. Channel (2023–2024)	
97	Dora	Chris Gifford, Valerie Walsh Valdes, and Eric Weiner (original characters) Chris Gifford and Valerie Walsh Valdes	2024–present	Little Coop; Walsh Valdés Productions; Pipeline Studios	Paramount+ Nickelodeon (2024–25); Nick Jr. Channel (2026)	Reboot of Dora the Explorer. Released on Paramount+ and later on Nickelodeon.
98	Wonder Pets: In the City	Josh Selig (original characters) (d): Jennifer Oxley	2024–present	Snowflake Films NYC; Kavaleer Productions	Apple TV	Revival to Wonder Pets!. Released on Apple TV.
99	Super Duper Bunny League	Jamie Smart (d): Jonny Belt and Robert Scull	2025–present	Scull + Belt; Business Finland AudioVisual Prod. Incentive; Gigglebug Entertainment	Nickelodeon	Based on the comic book series of the same name.
Upcoming
100	HexVets and Magic Pets	Sam Davies (original graphic novels) (d): Nicole Dubuc	January 18, 2027	Boom! Studios; Blue Zoo Animation Studio	Nickelodeon	Based on the graphic novel series of the same name.

=== Adult animated series ===
#	Title	Creator(s) / Developer(s)	Years	Co-production(s)	Network	Notes
2000s
101	Stripperella	Stan Lee	2003–04	The Firm, Inc.	Spike TV	Nick Digital is credited for the CGI animation.
102	Fatherhood	Bill Cosby; Charles Kipps	2004–05	Smiley, Inc.	Nick at Nite	Uncredited

=== Short series ===
Title	Creator(s) / Developer(s)	Years	Co-production(s)	Notes
Nick Jr. Just for Me Stories		2001		Released on television and nickjr.com. Produced by Nick Digital.
Welcome to the Wayne (web shorts)	Billy Lopez	2014	Yowza! Animation	Released on Nick.com.
Bug Salad	Carl Faruolo	2018		Released on YouTube.
Mr. Sheep & Sleepy Bear	Alan Foreman	2018		Released on YouTube.
Space Kid and Cat	Greg Nix and David Kantarowicz	2018		Released on YouTube.
Kinderwood	Otto Tang	2020–21	Titmouse, Inc.	Released on Noggin.

== Short pilots ==
=== Nickelodeon (greenlit to series) ===
Title	Episode	Creator(s) / Developer(s)	Year	Co-production(s)	Notes
Rugrats	"Tommy Pickles and the Great White Thing"	Arlene Klasky, Gábor Csupó, and Paul Germain	1990	Klasky Csupo	
Ren & Stimpy	"Big House Blues"	John Kricfalusi	1990	Carbunkle Cartoons; Spümcø	
Doug	"Doug Can't Dance"	Jim Jinkins	1990	Jumbo Pictures	
Rocko's Modern Life	"Trash-O-Madness"	Joe Murray	1992	Joe Murray Studios Company	
Aaahh!!! Real Monsters	N/A	Gábor Csupó and Peter Gaffney	1993	Klasky Csupo	
Psyched for Snuppa	N/A	Michael Pearlstein	1993	Stretch Films, Inc. Jumbo Pictures	Pilot for the KaBlam! segment Sniz & Fondue.
Arnold	N/A	Craig Bartlett	1994		Later screened theatrically during the release of Harriet the Spy in 1996. Greenlit as Hey Arnold!.
The Angry Beavers	"Snowbound"	Mitch Schauer	1994	Gunther-Wahl Productions, Inc.	
CatDog	"Dog Gone"	Peter Hannan	1995	Peter Hannan Productions	
SpongeBob SquarePants	"Help Wanted"	Stephen Hillenburg	1997		
ChalkZone	N/A	Bill Burnett and Larry Huber	1998	Frederator Incorporated	Aired as part of Oh Yeah! Cartoons.
The Wild Thornberrys	N/A	Arlene Klasky, Gábor Csupó, Steve Pepoon, David Silverman, and Stephen Sustarsic	1998	Klasky Csupo	
The Fairly OddParents!	N/A	Butch Hartman	1998	Frederator Incorporated	Aired as part of Oh Yeah! Cartoons.
Jimmy Neutron: Boy Genius	"Runaway Rocketboy!"	John A. Davis	1998	O Entertainment; DNA Productions	First Nicktoon based on a feature-length movie. Greenlit as The Adventures of Jimmy Neutron, Boy Genius.
As Told by Ginger	"The Party"	Emily Kapnek	1998	Klasky Csupo	
Rocket Beach	N/A	Arlene Klasky and Gabor Csupo	1998	Klasky Csupo	Greenlit as Rocket Power.
My Neighbor Was a Teenage Robot	N/A	Rob Renzetti	1999	Frederator Incorporated	Aired as part of Oh Yeah! Cartoons. Greenlit as My Life as a Teenage Robot.
Invader Zim	N/A	Jhonen Vasquez	1999	Wumberlog Productions	
All Growed Up	N/A	Arlene Klasky, Gábor Csupó, and Paul Germain	2001	Klasky Csupo	Greenlit as All Grown Up!.
Danny Phantom	N/A	Butch Hartman	2003	Billionfold Inc.	
The Backyardigans	N/A	Janice Burgess	2002	Nickelodeon Digital	made at the New York studio
Avatar: The Last Airbender	N/A	Michael Dante DiMartino and Bryan Konietzko	2004		
Catscratch	Doug TenNapel		2004		
El Tigre	"A Fistful of Nickels"	Sandra Equihua and Jorge R. Gutierrez	2005		
The X's	N/A	Carlos Ramos	2005		
Super Scout	N/A	Cynthia True and Amy Poehler	2006	Frederator Incorporated; Polka Dot Pictures; Paper Kite Productions	Aired as part of Nicktoons Film Festival. Greenlit as The Mighty B!.
Umizumiz	N/A	Soo Kim, Michael T. Smith and Jennifer Twomey	2006		Greenlit as Team Umizoomi.
Fanboy	N/A	Eric Robles	2008	Frederator Incorporated	Aired as part of Random! Cartoons. Greenlit as Fanboy & Chum Chum.
T.U.F.F. Puppy	N/A	Butch Hartman	2008	Billionfold Inc.	
Planet Sheen	N/A	Keith Alcorn and Steve Oedekerk	2010	O Entertainment; Omation Animation Studio	
Pig Goat Banana Mantis!	N/A	Dave Cooper and Johnny Ryan	2012	Nick Cross Animation	Greenlit as Pig Goat Banana Cricket.
Breadwinners	N/A	Steve Borst and Gary Doodles	2012		Released as part of Nickelodeon's 2012 animated shorts program.
Bad Seeds	N/A	C. H. Greenblatt	2013		Released as part of Nickelodeon's 2013 animated shorts program. Greenlit as Harvey Beaks.
The Loud House	N/A	Chris Savino	2013		Released as part of Nickelodeon's 2013 animated shorts program.
The Loud House	"The Loudest Mission: Relative Chaos"	Chris Savino	2017		Pilot for The Casagrandes.
Rock, Paper, Scissors	"TV Time"	Kyle Stegina and Josh Lehrman	2023		Released as part of Nickelodeon's Intergalactic Shorts Program
Wylde Pak	"Alpac-Attack"	Paul Watling and Kyle Marshall	2025		Released as part of Nickelodeon's Intergalactic Shorts Program

=== Nickelodeon (not greenlit to series) ===
Title	Creator(s) / Developer(s)	Year	Co-production(s)	Notes
Christmas in Tattertown	Ralph Bakshi	1988	Bakshi Animation	Originally was a pilot for a show named Tattertown. Eventually shown on Nickelodeon as a Christmas special until 1992.
The Crowville Chronicles	Brian Cosgrove	1990	Cosgrove Hall Films; Thames Television	
Trash	Brian Cosgrove	1990	Cosgrove Hall Films; Thames Television	
Big Beast Quintet	Joey Ahlbum and Marc Catapano	1990	Ahlbum Animation, Inc.	
Thunder Lizards	Joey Ahlbum and Marc Catapano	1990	Ahlbum Animation, Inc.	
The Weasel Patrol	Ken Macklin and Lela Dowling	1990	Mark Zander Productions	
The Louie & Louie Show	Gary Baseman	1993	Curious Pictures	Aired as part of KaBlam!.
Kid Komet and Galaxy Gal	Bob Camp and Jim Gomez	1997		
Hector the Get-Over Cat	John R. Dilworth	1998	Stretch Films, Inc.	
The Henry and June Show	Mark Marek	1999	Crank! It! Out! Inc	Planned spin-off of KaBlam!.
The Carmichaels	Arlene Klasky and Gábor Csupó	1999	Klasky Csupo	Planned spin-off of Rugrats, it was eventually made into A Rugrats Kwanzaa.
The Proud Family	Bruce W. Smith	1999	Hyperion Animation	Later picked up as a series by Disney Channel.
Simply Sisters	Mitch Schauer	1999	Gunther-Wahl Productions, Inc.	Planned spin-off of The Angry Beavers.
Stewy the Dog Boy	Dennis Messner	1999	Flying Mallet, Inc.	Aired as part of KaBlam!.
Terrytoons Presents: Crubside	Paul Terry and Frank Moser (original characters) (d): Mary Harrington and Robert Taylor	1999		Planned Terrytoons reboot for the network.
Garbage Boy		1999		Produced by Nick Digital.
Constant Payne	Micah Wright	2001		
Psyko Ferret	Atul Rao, Kim Saltarski, and Greg van Riel (d): Atul Rao, Kim Saltarski, Greg van Riel, Karen Krenis, Brian Strause, Emily Kapnek, and Paul Greenberg	2001	Klasky Csupo	
Skeleton Key	Andi Watson	2001	Slave Labor Graphics; Sunbow Entertainment	
Crash Nebula	Butch Hartman and Steve Marmel	2004	Frederator Incorporated	Planned spin-off of The Fairly OddParents.
The Patakis	Craig Bartlett	2004	Snee-Oosh, Inc.	Planned spin-off of Hey Arnold!
What's Cooking?	Arlene Klasky	2004	Klasky Csupo	
Chicken Town	Niko Meulemans	2005	Klasky Csupo	
Commander Bunsworth	Aglaia Mortcheva	2005	Klasky Csupo	
Junkyard Teddies	Arlene Klasky	2005	Klasky Csupo	
Kung Fu Spy Troll	David Fremont	2005		
Rollin' Rock Starz	Gábor Csupó	2005	Klasky Csupo	
SCHMUTZ	James Proimos and David Hale	2005	Klasky Csupo	
Wiener Squad	Niko Meulemans	2005	Klasky Csupo	
Zeek & Leo	Niko Meulemans	2005	Klasky Csupo	
Ace Bogart: Space Ape	Neal Sopata	2006	Klasky Csupo	
Big Babies	Arlene Klasky	2006	Klasky Csupo	
Eggheads	Arlene Klasky	2006	Klasky Csupo	
Grampa and Julie: Shark Hunters	Jef Czekaj	2006	Klasky Csupo	Adaptation of the comic of the same name that was regularly published on Nickelodeon Magazine.
Little Freaks	Erin Ehrlich	2006	Klasky Csupo	
My Stupid Cat	Everett Peck	2006	Klasky Csupo	
Ricky Z	Arlene Klasky	2006	Klasky Csupo	
Ronnie Biddles	John Matta and Ken Daly	2006	Klasky Csupo	
The Modifyers	Lynne Naylor and Chris Reccardi	2007		Aired as part of Shorts in a Bunch.
Adventure Time	Pendleton Ward	2008	Frederator Incorporated	Aired as part of Random! Cartoons. Later picked up as a series by Cartoon Network.
Mall Spies	Al Madrigal	2008		
Space Animals	Fabrice Sénia	2008	Planktoon Studios	
The Bravest Warriors	Pendleton Ward	2009	Frederator Incorporated	Aired as part of Random! Cartoons. Later picked up as a series by Cartoon Hangover and VRV.
Star and the Forces of Evil	Daron Nefcy	2009		Later picked up as a series by Disney XD and Disney Channel.
Leroy Dorsalfin	Mike Geiger	2009	Mike Geiger Animation	
Spellementary School	Butch Hartman	2011	Billionfold, Inc. Frederator Studios	Planned spin-off to The Fairly OddParents.
Super Macho Fighter	Jorge R. Gutierrez	2012	Mexopolis	
Level 15	Wolf-Rüdiger Bloss	2012		
Sky Rat	Craig Bartlett	2013	Snee-Oosh, Inc.	
Crazy Block	Iginio Straffi	2014	Rainbow S.p.A. (co-owned by Viacom)	
Harpy Gee	Brianne Drouhard	2014		
Planet Panic	Gene Goldstein	2018		

=== Produced for other Paramount-owned networks ===
Title	Creator(s) / Developer(s)	Year	Co-production(s)	Network	Status	Notes
Sugarless	Arlene Klasky; Erin Ehrlich	2005	Klasky Csupo	Noggin/The N	Failed	
Twinkle	Dora Nagy	2005	Klasky Csupo	Nick Jr.	Failed	
Chickiepoo and Fluff: Barnyard Detectives		2007		Noggin	Failed	Produced by Nick Digital

== Feature films and specials ==
=== Broadcast releases ===
#	Title	Year	Co-production(s)	Notes
1	Globehunters: An Around the World in 80 Days Adventure	2000	DIC Entertainment; Frederator Incorporated	Originally planned to premiere in 2000, the film eventually premiered as part of Nickelodeon Sunday Movie Toons in December 2002.
2	The Electric Piper	2000	Frederator Incorporated	Originally planned to premiere in 2000, the film eventually premiered in 2003.
3	Maniac Magee	2003	Edmonds Entertainment	Visual effects by Nick Digital
4	The Alan Brady Show	2003		Produced by Nick Digital
5	Holly Hobbie & Friends	2006–07	American Greetings	Miniseries of animated specials
6	Winx Club: The Secret of the Lost Kingdom (Nickelodeon version)	2012	Rainbow S.p.A.	Nickelodeon produced edited versions of these Winx Club movies. The plots were changed slightly, and the movies were re-dubbed to use the voice cast from the Nickelodeon revival of the series.
7	Winx Club: Magical Adventure (Nickelodeon version)	2013	Rainbow S.p.A.	Nickelodeon produced edited versions of these Winx Club movies. The plots were changed slightly, and the movies were re-dubbed to use the voice cast from the Nickelodeon revival of the series.
8	Half-Shell Heroes: Blast to the Past	2015		Special based on Teenage Mutant Ninja Turtles toy line Half-Shelf Heroes.
9	Albert	2016		
10	Hey Arnold!: The Jungle Movie	2017	Snee-Oosh, Inc.	Sequel to Hey Arnold!: The Movie and The Journal. Revival film and series finale of Hey Arnold!.
11	Lucky	2019		
12	Baby Shark's Big Movie!	2023	Pinkfong	Released simultaneously on Nickelodeon and Paramount+.
13	No Time to Spy: A Loud House Movie	2024		Released simultaneously on Nickelodeon and Paramount+.
14	A Loud House Christmas Movie: Naughty or Nice	2025		

=== Digital releases ===
#	Title	Release date	Co-production(s)	Notes
1	Rocko's Modern Life: Static Cling	2019	Joe Murray Productions	Revival special of Rocko's Modern Life. Originally planned to air on Nickelodeon, it was later released on Netflix.
2	Invader Zim: Enter the Florpus	2019	Maven Animation Studio	Revival film of Invader Zim. Originally planned to air on Nickelodeon, it was later released on Netflix.
3	The SpongeBob Movie: Sponge on the Run	2020	Paramount Animation; Nickelodeon Movies; United Plankton Pictures; MRC	Distributed by Paramount+ and premium VOD services in the U.S. in 2021. Released on Netflix worldwide on November 5, 2020. Originally planned for a summer 2020 theatrical release, but moved to streaming due to the COVID-19 pandemic. Released in Canadian theaters on August 14, 2020.
4	The Loud House Movie	2021	Nickelodeon Movies	Originally planned for a 2020 theatrical release, it was later released on Netflix.
5	Rise of the Teenage Mutant Ninja Turtles: The Movie	2022	Nickelodeon Movies	Released on Netflix.
6	Blue's Big City Adventure	2022	Nickelodeon Movies; 9 Story Media Group; Brown Bag Films; Line By Line Media; Boxel Animation	Released on Paramount+.
7	Baby Shark's Big Movie!	2023	Nickelodeon Movies; Pinkfong	Released simultaneously on Nickelodeon and Paramount+.
8	The Casagrandes Movie	2024	Nickelodeon Movies; Mighty Studios	Released on Netflix.
9	No Time to Spy: A Loud House Movie	2024	Nickelodeon Movies	Released simultaneously on Nickelodeon and Paramount+.
10	Saving Bikini Bottom: The Sandy Cheeks Movie	2024	Nickelodeon Movies; United Plankton Pictures	Released on Netflix.
11	Plankton: The Movie	2025	Nickelodeon Movies; United Plankton Pictures	Released on Netflix.

=== Direct-to-video ===
All the films (except the international release of Charlotte's Web 2: Wilbur's Great Adventure) were distributed to home video by Paramount Home Entertainment.

#	Title	Release date	Co-production(s)	Notes
1	Blue's Big Musical Movie	2000		
2	Charlotte's Web 2: Wilbur's Great Adventure	2003	Universal Pictures International; Paramount Pictures	Animation services
3	As Told by Ginger: The Wedding Frame	2004	Klasky Csupo	Series finale of As Told by Ginger. Originally planned to air on television, it was later released on VHS and DVD instead in the United States.
4	Rugrats Tales from the Crib: Snow White	2005	Klasky Csupo	
5	Rugrats Tales from the Crib: Three Jacks and a Beanstalk	2006	Klasky Csupo	

== Theatrical films ==
Title	Release date	Co-production(s)	Budget	Gross	Rotten Tomatoes	Metacritic
Hey Arnold!: The Movie	June 28, 2002	Snee-Oosh, Inc. Nickelodeon Movies	$3–4,000,000	$15,249,308	29%	47
