= List of Pig Goat Banana Cricket episodes =

Pig Goat Banana Cricket is an American animated television series on Nickelodeon. Created by Dave Cooper and Johnny Ryan, the series follows the adventures of the eponymous characters Pig (Matt L. Jones), Goat (Candi Milo), Banana (Thomas F. Wilson), and Cricket (Paul Rugg). Most episodes present the escapades of the four characters separately until they meet at the end. The first season premiered on July 16, 2015.

On June 25, 2015, it was announced that the series had been picked up for a second season of 14 episodes, ahead of the series premiere.

The first 20 episodes of the first season aired on Nickelodeon. For the remainder of season one and the entirety of season two, episodes aired on sister network Nicktoons. The show ended on August 11, 2018.

== Series overview ==
Season	Episodes		Originally released		
Season	Episodes		First released	Last released	Network
Pilot			August 13, 2012		Vimeo
1	26	20	July 16, 2015	February 26, 2016	Nickelodeon
1	26	6	September 25, 2016	November 13, 2016	Nicktoons
2	14		November 20, 2016	August 11, 2018	Nicktoons

== Episodes ==
The episodes below are listed in the order they were originally broadcast.

=== Pilot (2012) ===
Title	Directed by	Written by	Original release date
Pig Goat Banana Mantis!	Dave Cooper and Nick Cross	Johnny Ryan	August 13, 2012
Pig, Goat, Banana, and Mantis live in a semi-isolated cement tree house they inherited from their Old Uncle Robot. They grew up in the tree house, raised by their Uncle, until the trithalium crystals in his cerebrex burned out, causing him to permanently deactivate, leaving them suddenly on their own. Because they all grew up in the same treehouse together, they have developed a really close bond, but they still have very different personalities that often clash in dramatic ways. However, even though they do battle with each other from time to time, they always come together whenever a crisis threatens their home or strange family unit.

=== Season 1 (2015–16) ===
No. overall	No. in season	Title	Directed by	Written by	Storyboarded by	Original release date	Prod. code	US viewers (millions)
Nickelodeon
1	1	"Pig Goat Banana; Cricket High Five!"	Nick Cross, Ben Jones, and Gabe Swarr	David Sacks and Johnny Ryan	Nick Cross, Ben Jones, Brian Morante, and Gabe Swarr	July 16, 2015	101	1.24
Pig befriends a shopping cart, Goat tries to find somewhere to play her new song, Banana leads troopers to a cave and Cricket uses beauty spray to impress Goat. Note: This episode aired as a sneak peek on July 16, 2015, two days before its series premiere on July 18, 2015.
2	2	"Fudge-pocalypse"	Luke Brookshier	Doug Lieblich	Dalton Grant and John Trabbic III	July 18, 2015	102	1.23
Pig's love of the fudge bubbles causes the town to be flooded; Goat uses her ark to save the town; Banana is captured by pirates and Cricket re-creates his life on a deserted island.
3	3	"Super Space Meatball"	Luke Brookshier	Doug Lieblich, Johnny Ryan, David; Sacks, and Merriwether Williams	Dalton Grant and John Trabbic III	July 25, 2015	108	1.24
A space meatball gives the friends superpowers; Goat is battling Lipstick Horse; Pig stops the Time Donut from stealing; Cricket is upset that he has no powers and Banana joins the villains.
4	4	"The Chronicles of Cutesachusetts"	Joe Horne	David Sacks and Johnny Ryan	Brianne Drouhard and Monica Tomova	August 1, 2015	104	1.50
Pig cleans the toilet and is sucked into another world. Goat struggles to fix a hole in the roof. Banana is too lazy to simply put a jar of peanut butter away. Cricket modifies a vacuum that sucks everyone into another world.
5	5	"Prank Thy Neighbor"	Carl Faruolo	David Sacks, Johnny Ryan, and Merriwether Williams	Phil Jacobson and Kahee Lim	August 8, 2015	106	1.24
The gang gets new hick neighbors, the Hamshanks; Banana vows to prank them; Pig falls in love with one of the Hamshanks; Goat is infected and slowly turns into a Hamshank and Cricket searches for a cure to help his beloved Goat.
6	6	"Miss Cutesy Meow; Meows"	Luke Brookshier	Doug Lieblich	Dalton Grant and John Trabbic III	September 7, 2015	111	1.18
Pig gets an undercover mission at the Picklemart. Banana buys a new friend who turns against him. Goat has to rush to make an audition for her new movie and Cricket has to protect his secret toy collection.
7	7	"Let's Get Tiny"	Carl Faruolo and Kim Roberson	David Sacks, Johnny Ryan, and Merriwether Williams	Phil Jacobson and Kahee Lim	September 18, 2015	110	1.39
Pig wants to help a whale with his blowhole. Goat sides with some misfit paintings after being accused of stealing from a museum. Cricket helps a team of bacteria cheerleaders win their match. Banana plots to get his old boss back.
8	8	"The Most Beautiful; Roach in the World"	Ian Graham	Merriwether Williams	Brianne Drouhard and Monica Tomova	September 25, 2015	112	1.07
Pig finds a police kit in a cereal box, and assists his moustached idol; Goat enters a cockroach into a beauty pageant; Banana gets trapped in a factory and Cricket must return to kindergarten to get a diploma.
9	9	"The Tooth of My True; Love"	Luke Brookshier	Doug Lieblich, Johnny Ryan, David; Sacks, and Merriwether Williams	Dalton Grant and John Trabbic III	October 2, 2015	107	1.33
Goat is saved by a masked hero and believes he's her one true love; Pig becomes a musical chairs champion by body checking competitors; Banana is mistaken for a popular toy and Cricket's female clone is smarter than him and they both remove their brains to battle each other.
10	10	"Gauntlet of Humiliation"	Joe Horne and Ben Jones	Doug Lieblich, Johnny Ryan, David; Sacks, and Merriwether Williams	Brianne Drouhard and Monica Tomova	October 9, 2015	105	1.04
Pig, Goat, Banana and Cricket all have their own adventures while trying to replace a broken television; Pig gets a job at Sky Burger; Goat enters a talent show; Banana creates a fragrance; Cricket invents total immersion TV.
11	11	"DJ Wheelbarrow Full of Nachos"	Joe Horne	Justin Charlebois, Doug Lieblich, Johnny Ryan, and David Sacks	Brianne Drouhard and Monica Tomova	October 16, 2015	109	0.97
Pig becomes an outlaw as he distributes illegal pickles. Cricket reunites with an old experiment that calls him, dad. Banana sues Ranger Rhino to get his video games back. Goat's concert is ruined when her kid sister shows up.
12	12	"Underpants-Palooza"	Kim Roberson and Carl Faruolo	David Sacks and Johnny Ryan	Phil Jacobson and Kahee Lim	November 6, 2015	113	1.11
Pig's parents come to town for a visit. Goat becomes a subject for her own reality show; Cricket uses science to become more appealing and Banana scares his junior ranger using a legendary monster.
13	13	"Bananaland"	Luke Brookshier	Doug Lieblich, Johnny Ryan, David; Sacks, and Merriwether Williams	Sara Jerzykowski and John Trabbic III	November 13, 2015	114	0.84
Banana builds his own theme park, Cricket needs to hire a new lab assistant, Goat joins a band of country bears and Pig takes care of the house while his roommates are away.
14	14	"Zombie Broheims"	Ian Graham	Justin Charlebois	Brianne Drouhard and Monica Tomova	November 20, 2015	115	0.79
Banana makes Pig his substitute scoutmaster for the day. Banana joins a herd of zombies. Goat wants to be Customer of the Day at the Smoothie shop. Cricket awaits the best cookie in the world from being ready in his lab.
15	15	"Happy Chalawunga!"	Carl Faruolo	Merriwether Williams	Phil Jacobson and Kahee Lim	December 4, 2015	103	1.05
Pig goes to the sewers to search for Filthy the Foot; Banana must go shopping for Chalawunga gifts; Goat wants to be in the Chalawunga Parade to sing her song and Cricket creates Mecha Foot as a gift for Pig.
16	16	"Mall Ya Later"	Kim Roberson	Merriwether Williams	Phil Jacobson and Kahee Lim	January 15, 2016	116	0.79
A new mall is built around The Treehouse; Banana wants to buy a toy gun but must make enough money to first; Goat starts a wizarding kiosk; Cricket has to manage a Jorts store and Pig goes to the movies.
17	17	"Total Bananarchy"	Luke Brookshier and Kim Roberson	Doug Lieblich	Sara Jerzykowski and John Trabbic III	January 22, 2016	117	0.90
Pig makes a wish to become the new president of the planet on his birthday; Banana gets The Shragger to be his bodyguard; Goat builds a sculpture for Pig's birthday and in search for a more organized society, Cricket flies to Mars.
18	18	"Angry Old Raisin"	Ian Graham	Justin Charlebois	Brianne Drouhard and Joe Orrantia	February 5, 2016	118	0.90
Cricket tries to impress Dr. Eggplant Face. Pig causes destruction while visiting his elderly neighbor's house; Goat inadvertently sends an offensive e-mail to the president and Banana performs in a talent show.
19	19	"Cow Duck Avocado; Mantis"	Cosmo Segurson	Merriwether Williams	Phil Jacobson and Kahee Lim	February 19, 2016	119	0.93
Banana takes role of an avocado; Pig becomes the belt of a movie star; Goat finds a movie director and Cricket tries to make a movie on his own.
20	20	"It's Time to Slumber; Party"	Kim Roberson	David Sacks and Johnny Ryan	Sara Jerzykowski and John Trabbic III	February 26, 2016	120	0.95
Cricket picks his nose and tries to stop it; Pig does not have anyone to have a slumber party with; Goat joins the force in order to attend a VIP concert and Banana does news casting.
Nicktoons
21	21	"Secret Origins: Special; Edition"	Ian Graham	Justin Charlebois, Doug Lieblich, Johnny Ryan, David Sacks, and Merriwether Williams	Brianne Drouhard and Joe Orrantia	September 25, 2016	121	N/A
Each member of the gang tells their version of how they all became roommates, with the stories ranging from a high school rebel comedy by Goat to a space adventure by Cricket to an old fairy tale by Pig and whatever is in Banana's imagination.
22	22	"Moby Woof"	Cosmo Segurson	Doug Lieblich	Phil Jacobson and Kahee Lim	October 2, 2016	122	N/A
Pig competes to become the next Picklemart mascot; Banana asks the sun to go away so he can sleep; Cricket visits each of his friends' dreams to ask them for a gift and Goat meets the world's biggest dog at the circus, and he steals her horn.
23	23	"Prince Mermeow Moves; In!"	Kim Roberson	Merriwether Williams	Sara Jerzykowski and John Trabbic III	October 16, 2016	123	0.12
When Prince Mermeow moves into the treehouse, he makes miserable rules for the four friends. Pig goes to the North Pole, Banana spends the night in the woods, Cricket is forced to go to a public pool and Goat is tricked into making her room better.
24	24	"The Mud Munchkins; Must Be Crazy"	Cosmo Segurson	Justin Charlebois	Phil Jacobson and Kahee Lim	October 23, 2016	125	0.10
Pig needs to find a place where his shopping cart family is accepted; Cricket needs to go to the bathroom in a clean environment; Goat loses her thermos to the Mud Munchkins and Banana makes real life imitate video games.
25	25	"Gold Rush"	Ian Graham	David Sacks and Johnny Ryan	Brianne Drouhard and Joe Orrantia	November 6, 2016	124	0.11
Banana searches for gold with his friends; Pig uses dancing shoes on a dancing date; Goat struggles to cross a busy street and Cricket loses his butt after turning it into gold. Note: This episode aired in Canada on September 4, 2016.
26	26	"King of TV"	Kim Roberson	Doug Lieblich	Sara Jerzykowski and John Trabbic III	November 13, 2016	126	0.09
Pig and Angry Old Raisin try to get back the TV remote; Goat has to cross a road toll; Banana befriends a train full of hobos and Cricket takes his new robot out to dinner before using her to obtain the remote.

=== Season 2 (2016–18) ===
No. overall	No. in season	Title	Directed by	Written by	Storyboarded by	Original release date	Prod. code	US viewers (millions)
27	1	"Road Trippin'"	Kim Roberson	Jacob Fleisher	Sara Jerzykowski and John Trabbic III	November 20, 2016	203	N/A
On a road trip to go see the Pretty Panda at the zoo, Goat stops at a concert, Pig stops at a trampoline theme park. Banana has to do jail time and Cricket has to get him back.
28	2	"Heat Wave"	Ian Graham	Johnny Ryan and David Sacks	Brianne Drouhard and Joe Orrantia	December 4, 2016	201	N/A
Pig wants to have a pool party; Goat gets confused for a secret agent; Banana beats the heat by stealing an ice cream truck and Cricket gets trapped in a cave.
29	3	"Charm School"	Cosmo Segurson	Justin Charlebois	Phil Jacobson and Kahee Lim	December 4, 2016	202	N/A
Pig needs to learn some manners; Goat wants to protect her favorite city landmark; Banana becomes a world-famous stuntman and Cricket wants to get Pig back to his old ways.
30	4	"The Goofy Turkey Zone"	Cosmo Segurson	Jacob Fleisher	Phil Jacobson and Kahee Lim	April 12, 2017	210	0.12
Cricket goes back in time to date Goat; Goat wishes to be a great musician; Banana needs to win a video game competition and Pig possesses Angry Old Raisin's scooter.
31	5	"The Ding-A-Ling Circus"	Ian Graham	Eric Acosta, Justin Charlebois, Jacob Fleisher, Johnny Ryan, and David Sacks	Brianne Drouhard and Joe Orrantia	April 19, 2017	213	0.17
The gang helps save a failing circus; Goat beautifies the oddities; Banana rigs the midway; Pig starts a flea circus and Cricket trains the animals.
32	6	"Steak Bus"	Ian Graham	Jacob Fleisher	Brianne Drouhard and Joe Orrantia	April 26, 2017	208	0.13
Pig directs a commercial for the Picklemart; Banana attempts to eat the perfect steak; Cricket needs to get his super suit dry cleaned and Goat is recruited to be a famous wrestler.
33	7	"Witness Protection Program"	Kim Roberson	Eric Acosta	Sara Jerzykowski and Zach Smith	May 3, 2017	211	0.12
The gang must go in disguise to hide from a dangerous criminal: Pig as a professor, Goat as a businesswoman, Cricket as a baby and Banana as a plumber.
34	8	"Flowers for Burgerstein"	Ian Graham	Justin Charlebois	Brianne Drouhard and Joe Orrantia	May 10, 2017	209	0.12
Banana reunites with his musical family; Pig takes Angry Old Raisin to a dog show; Goat falls in love with Tony Towel and Cricket makes Burgerstein smart.
35	9	"Hotel It on the Mountain"	Kim Roberson	Justin Charlebois	Sara Jerzykowski, Zach; Smith, and John Trabbic III	May 17, 2017	205	0.21
The roommates open a hotel; Pig is the bellboy, Goat is the chef, Banana is the hotel manager and Cricket is the maid.
36	10	"Where Do Pickles Come; From?"	Cosmo Segurson	Eric Acosta	Phil Jacobson and Kahee Lim	May 24, 2017	212	0.12
Goat wants to build a new entertainment center; Cricket wants to impress Goat by being a vigilante; Banana becomes an Internet celebrity and Pig finds out where pickles come from.
37	11	"Hospital Time"	Kim Roberson and Cosmo Segurson	Johnny Ryan and David Sacks	Phil Jacobson and Kahee Lim	May 31, 2017	214	0.20
The gang want to get to the hospital to eat the world's best mashed potatoes; Banana plays a betting game; Pig does a surgery with Angry Old Raisin; Goat fixes Tony Towel and Cricket makes himself sick.
38	12	"Love Boat"	Cosmo Segurson	Johnny Ryan and David Sacks	Phil Jacobson and Kahee Lim	August 11, 2018	204	N/A
The gang takes a cruise vacation. Cricket shows off his discount ticket; Banana plays matchmaker; Pig wants more room in his body to eat pickles and Goat has to cover for her mistake. Note: This episode aired in Poland on August 29, 2017.
39	13	"It's on Like Con Con"	Ian Graham	Eric Acosta	Brianne Drouhard and Joe Orrantia	August 11, 2018	206	N/A
At Convention Con, Pig's movie is debuting; Banana finds a way to make money on comics; Cricket wants an elusive toy and Goat seeks help to win the costume contest. Note: This episode aired in Poland on August 31, 2017.
40	14	"Jimmy Ron Cricket"	Kim Roberson	Johnny Ryan and David Sacks	Sara Jerzykowski and Zach Smith	August 11, 2018	207	N/A
Pig goes on a tour of the Picklemart. Banana finds his old ranger friend. Cricket's brother escapes from prison and Goat's idol pays her a visit. Note: This episode aired in Poland on September 1, 2017.
