= Jenny Beeching =

British singer-songwriter

Jenny Beeching (born 1950 in Romford) is a British songwriter, singer and guitarist.

== Career ==
Jenny Beeching's first began performing professionally in 1966 alongside Christina Williamson. During the 1960s and 1970s, she worked with Tony Cliff, Dave Cooper, and Bert Jansch. Between 1979 and 1986 she released the albums A Right Song and Dance (1979), No More Sad Goodbyes (1983), and Hotline From London (1986). She worked extensively with violinist Chris Haigh, with whom she performed in Hong Kong, the United States, former Yugoslavia, and Australia. Recently she has worked as a writer of songs for children, which include Electricity and Recycle It!.
