= The Bagel and Becky Show =

- Also known as: Dave Cooper's The Bagel and Becky Show; Bagel and Becky
- Genre: Adventure; Comedy; Slapstick; Animated sitcom
- Created by: Dave Cooper
- Based on: Bagel's Lucky Hat by Hector Mumbly
- Developed by: Doug Hadders; Adam Rotstein; Ken Cuperus
- Directed by: Jamie LeClaire; Phil Lafrance
- Voices of: Kevin McDonald; Nikki Payne; Michael Therriault; Doug Hadders; Craig Brown; Janet Porter; Bryn McAuley; Ellen-Ray Hennessy
- Composer: Matt Ouimet
- Country of origin: Canada
- Original language: English
- No. of seasons: 1
- No. of episodes: 26

Production
- Executive producers: John Leitch; Michelle Melanson Cuperus; Kyle MacDougall; Henrietta Hurford-Jones
- Producer: Heather Wilson
- Editor: Lucas Armstrong
- Running time: 23 minutes
- Production companies: Radical Sheep Productions; Jam Filled Entertainment

Original release
- Network: Teletoon
- Release: November 14, 2016 – March 3, 2017

The Bagel and Becky Show (also known as Dave Cooper's The Bagel and Becky Show or simply Bagel and Becky) is a Canadian animated children's television series created by Dave Cooper, the co-creator of Nickelodeon's Pig Goat Banana Cricket, and produced by Radical Sheep Productions and Jam Filled Entertainment for Teletoon. The series debuted worldwide on Teletoon+ in Poland on November 14, 2016. 26 episodes were produced.

== Plot ==
The Bagel and Becky Show is about siblings Bagel the dog and Becky the cat, as they try to seek out fun and adventure in their zany, eccentric, downright crazy town of Awkward Hills.

== Characters ==
=== Main ===
- Bagel (voiced by Kevin McDonald) is an energetic, dimwitted and happy-go-lucky yellow and brown Golden Retriever that often gets himself and Becky into trouble.
- Becky (voiced by Nikki Payne) is a cautious and intelligent maroon and white tuxedo cat that tries to get herself and Bagel out of trouble.
- Percy (voiced by Doug Hadders) is a neurotic, lonely blue pigeon desperate to be friends with Bagel and Becky. He has agoraphobia, despite being a pigeon, and his terrible luck and tendency to be on the receiving end of any accidental mayhem resulting from Bagel and Becky's misadventures doesn't exactly do him any favors either.

=== Recurring ===
- Mom (voiced by Ellen-Ray Hennessy) is Bagel and Becky's large human mother. She likes to cook up delicious pancakes every morning.
- Loaf (voiced by Craig Brown) and Lisa (voiced by Janet Porter) are the main antagonists. They are a pair of a brown gopher and an orange flying squirrel, both bent on destroying Bagel and Becky.
- Mayor Torgo (voiced by Michael Therriault) is the mayor of Awkward Falls. He is actually an evil, malevolent alien, but despite his poor disguise, only Becky seems to notice.
- Old Man Jenkinsbot (voiced by Michael Therriault) is an intelligent, elderly robot that acts like an evil mad scientist. His inventions are often misused by Bagel and Becky.
- Argentina (voiced by Bryn McAuley) and Phillipe (voiced by Craig Brown) are two greedy, somewhat antagonistic explorers who hate when Bagel and Becky discover something before they do, and will go to any lengths to do so.
- Cyril (voiced by Michael Therriault) is a barber that Bagel is terrified of.
- Skip Pauseforeffect (voiced by Craig Brown) is a local television personality who hosts Bagel and Becky's favourite game shows.

== Episodes ==
No.	Title	Written by	Storyboard by	Polish air date	Canadian air date	Prod. code
1	"Dig Your Own Hole" "Blood Is Thicker Than Water, But Thinner Than Pancakes"	Doug Hadders and Adam Rotstein	Steve Stefanelli Matt Roach	November 14, 2016	February 6, 2017	101
Bagel digs himself and Becky into an ancient lake. Bagel and Becky get into a fight.
2	"Three Heads Are Better Than Two" "The Long, Hot, Toxic Summer"	Doug Hadders and Adam Rotstein Doug Hadders, Adam Rotstein, and Ken Cuperus	Ian Westoby Matt Roach	November 15, 2016	February 7, 2017	102
Bagel breaks the rules at Jenkinsbot's place and touches everything. Bagel accidentally creates a giant, terrifying, mutant hedge maze.
3	"Election Destructionation" "Becky on the Inside"	Doug Hadders and Adam Rotstein Doug Hadders, Adam Rotstein, and Ken Cuperus	Steve Stefanelli Jeff Amey	November 16, 2016	February 8, 2017	103
Becky competes with a human-hating alien who wins mayoral elections unopposed. Bagel and Percy shrink themselves inside Becky.
4	"A Slide in the Park" "It Ain't Easy Bein' Grease"	Doug Hadders and Adam Rotstein Doug Hadders, Adam Rotstein, and Ken Cuperus	Matt Roach Ian Westoby	November 17, 2016	February 9, 2017	104
Bagel and Becky build their own playground. Bagel and Becky travel through time.
5	"Hair Today, Gone Tomorrow" "Hats Not All"	Doug Hadders and Adam Rotstein Doug Hadders, Adam Rotstein, and Ken Cuperus	Steve Stefanelli Jeff Amey	November 18, 2016	February 10, 2017	105
Bagel doesn't like getting haircuts. Bagel finds out that his lucky hat's gone.
6	"Jawed Off" "Adventures in Bagel Sitting"	Josh Sager and Jerome Simpson Stephanie Kaliner	Matt Roach Ian Westoby	November 21, 2016	February 11, 2017	106
Bagel develops a powerful jaw after eating large amounts of chewing gum. Jenkinsbot babysits Bagel and Becky for Mom's night out.
7	"To the Moon, Bagel. To the Moon." "Aero-Dumb-Namic!"	Evan Thaler Hickey Shawn Kalb	Brad Cayford Steve Stefanelli	November 22, 2016	February 12, 2017	107
Bagel and Becky go to the Moon to replace Mom's Faberge Moon. Becky makes a life-size paper airplane.
8	"I Got You, Bib" "Where the Balls Roll Wild and Free"	Dave Dias Stephanie Kaliner	Matt Roach Ian Westoby	November 23, 2016	February 13, 2017	108
Bagel and Becky get their old bibs. Mom gives Bagel and Becky a rubber ball.
9	"Old Man Lovinsbot" "Rash and Burn"	Stephanie Kaliner Shawn Kalb	Brad Cayford José Pou	April 21, 2017	February 14, 2017	109
Bagel and Becky try to cheer Jenkinsbot up by recreating his lost love. Bagel gets a rash on his back shaped like a treasure map.
10	"Declawbotomy" "Lord of the Fleas"	Josh Sager and Jerome Simpson Evan Thaler Hickey	José Pou Leisl Adams	November 24, 2016	February 15, 2017	110
Bagel clips Becky's nails after she ignores him during her annual shredathon. Bagel finds a hobo hat.
11	"Can Don't" "Oh Nose You Didn't"	Shawn Kalb Evan Thaler Hickey	Matt Roach Brad Cayford	November 25, 2016	February 16, 2017	111
Bagel finds a can he can't open and wants to know what's inside. Bagel gets a robotic nose.
12	"Waking Bagel" "Sleep Overthrow"	Josh Sager and Jerome Simpson Evan Thaler Hickey	Steve Stefanelli Ian Westoby	November 28, 2016	February 17, 2017	112
Bagel finds himself trapped in his dream world. Bagel invites Loaf and Lisa over for a sleepover.
13	"Fur Yer Eyes Only" "Boot the Bot"	Josh Sager and Jerome Simpson Evan Thaler Hickey	Leisl Adams José Pou	November 29, 2016	February 18, 2017	113
Bagel goes bald and uses hair-growth serum. Bagel and Becky try rebooting Jenkinsbot.
14	"Sofa, So Good" "My Tooth!"	Sadiya Durrani Craig Martin	Matt Roach Steve Stefanelli	November 30, 2016	February 19, 2017	114
Bagel and Becky get sucked into their clubhouse sofa. Bagel and Becky make the tooth fairy retire.
15	"Toxic Waste Not, Toxic Want Not" "About Face"	Shawn Kalb Josh Sager and Jerome Simpson	Leisl Adams José Pou	February 6, 2017	February 20, 2017	115
Bagel and Becky accidentally start an outbreak of an infectious contagion. Bagel and Becky's funny faces freeze on them.
16	"The Mayor Affair" "Holy Hydrant"	Evan Thaler Hickey Sadiya Durrani	Brad Cayford Ian Westoby	February 7, 2017 February 8, 2017	February 21, 2017	116
Becky is suspicious about Mayor Torgo falling for Mom. Bagel, Becky, and Percy break into the Fire Hydrant Museum to see the world's oldest fire hydrant.
17	"Sky Dog" "Moussed Moose"	Craig Martin Shawn Kalb	Steve Stefanelli Leisl Adams	February 9, 2017 February 10, 2017	February 22, 2017	117
Bagel and Becky help Percy overcome his fears. Bagel tries out a new hairstyle.
18	"Out of Tune" "Pancake Panic"	Josh Sager and Jerome Simpson Shawn Kalb	José Pou Matt Roach	February 13, 2017 February 14, 2017	February 23, 2017	118
Bagel and Becky sell their bedroom to a land developer. Mum's recipe for the world's fluffiest pancake is mysteriously stolen!
19	"I'll Be Bath" "Buried Treasure of Friendship"	Sadiya Durrani Craig Martin	Ian Westoby Brad Cayford	February 15, 2017 February 16, 2017	February 24, 2017	119
A visitor from the future warns Bagel that dirt will control his mind. Bagel and Becky are trapped with Phillippe and Argentina.
20	"Horrormarket" "Beware the Pancake"	Evan Thaler Hickey Stephanie Kaliner	Leisl Adams Steve Stefanelli	April 17, 2017	February 25, 2017	120
All of the kids in town search for the last box of their favorite snack. After devouring another batch of Mum's pancakes, Bagel and Becky decide to return the favor by making her a pancake.
21	"It's a Dry, Dry, Dry World" "Match Point"	Stephanie Kaliner Andrew Harrison	José Pou Mark Thornton	April 18, 2017	February 26, 2017	121
Bagel and Becky use a vacuum cleaner to suck up all the moisture in the atmosphere. Becky becomes obsessed with the red dot of a laser pointer.
22	"Rumplestinkskin" "Plates Gonna Plate"	Andrew Harrison Josh Sager and Jerome Simpson	Matt Roach Ian Westoby	April 19, 2017	February 27, 2017	122
A strange and elusive elf begins framing Bagel for creating terrible smells. Bagel wins the town's Plate-Smashing Competition by breaking every plate in town.
23	"O Brother Who Art Thou" "Wrath of Motherthing"	Jeff Sager Josh Sager and Jerome Simpson	Steve Stefanelli Leisl Adams	April 20, 2017	February 28, 2017	123
While helping Jenkinsbot spring clean his basement Bagel and Becky stumble across something unexpected. Torgo is desperate to impress his Motherthing on Mother's Day.
24	"Attack of the Night Shifties" "Drift Miffed"	Stephanie Kaliner Shawn Kalb	Matt Roach Ian Westoby	April 24, 2017	March 1, 2017	124
Bagel, Becky and Percy hear strange laughter coming from the park. Bagel loses his precious house key in a massive snow drift.
25	"The 12 Quadrillion Days of Christmas" "Weredo's and Weredon'ts"	Evan Thaler Hickey	Leisl Adams Steve Stefanelli	April 25, 2017	March 2, 2017	125
When Bagel finds a wishbone, he wishes it was Christmas every day. Awkward Hills is plagued by a series of hair-related crimes.
26	"The Man with the Golden Walker" "Hairball"	Jeff Sager	José Pou Ian Westoby	April 26, 2017	March 3, 2017	126
The kids are excited to get a visit from Mum's dad- Grandpa. After Becky coughs up a hairball, she and Bagel teach other kids how to play their favorite sport.

== Release ==
=== Broadcast ===
The Bagel and Becky Show debuted on Teletoon+ in Poland on November 14, 2016, and later premiered on Teletoon in Canada on February 6, 2017. The series also aired on CITV in United Kingdom, ABC Me in Australia, RTÉ2 in Ireland and Pop in Pakistan.
