= Sunny Day (TV series) =

Children's animated television series

- Genre: Animated series
- Based on: The Fairytale Hairdresser series by: Abie Longstaff; Lauren Beard
- Developed by: Paula Rosenthal; Sarah Blondine Mullervy
- Directed by: Shawn Seles; Dave Barton Thomas; Joey So (season 1)
- Voices of: Lilla Crawford; Rob Morrison; Élan Luz Rivera; Taylor Louderman; Kevin Duda; Melissa van der Schyff; Eleanor Snowdon
- Theme music composer: Joleen Belle; Joaquim Svarre; Michelle Buzz
- Composers: George Gabriel (season 1); Kevin Kliesch (season 2)
- Countries of origin: United States; United Kingdom; Canada
- Original language: English
- No. of seasons: 2
- No. of episodes: 60 (list of episodes)

Production
- Executive producer: Paula Rosenthal
- Producers: TJ House (episodes 1–27); Heather A. Tilert (episodes 1–27); Kirk Van Wormer; Darin Bristow; Rachel Simon (season 2)
- Running time: 22 minutes
- Production companies: Pipeline Studios; Silvergate Media; Nickelodeon Animation Studio

Original release
- Network: Nickelodeon
- Release: August 21, 2017 – August 10, 2018
- Network: Nick Jr.
- Release: October 21, 2018 – December 1, 2019
- Network: Amazon Prime Video
- Release: March 1, 2020

Sunny Day is an animated children's television series produced by Silvergate Media and Nickelodeon Animation Studio and animated by Pipeline Studios. The series revolves around Sunny (voiced by Lilla Crawford), a tween-age hairdresser who runs her own hair salon with the help of her dog Doodle (Rob Morrison), hair colorist Rox (Élan Luz Rivera), and receptionist Blair (Taylor Louderman). Sunny's best customers are Timmy (Kevin Duda), who is in charge of hosting events and shows in Sunny's hometown, and Cindy (Melissa van der Schyff), the unlucky town chef who has a constant bad hair day. The series is loosely based on the Random House picture book series Fairytale Hairdresser by Abie Longstaff and illustrated by Lauren Beard. Each episode features an original song written by Peter Lurye.

The show's production was announced in March 2016. On April 5, 2016, the show was renewed for a second season of 20 episodes. The series premiered on Nickelodeon in the United States on August 21, 2017. New episodes moved to the separate Nick Jr. Channel in October 2018. The show also aired in Canada on Treehouse TV and on Nick Jr. and Milkshake! in the United Kingdom.

The entire series was added to Paramount+ on March 24, 2021. As of January 1, 2024, the entire series was removed due to licensing contracts.

== Premise ==
Taking place in the seaside city of Friendly Falls, the series follows a professional hairstylist named Sunny who works at her own hair salon. Sunny uses her creativity and knowledge of hair care to solve problems. The other salon employees are Sunny's talking dog Doodle, Rox the hair colourist, and Blair the receptionist. Sunny's best customers are Timmy, who hosts every town event in Friendly Falls, and Cindy, the unlucky local baker with constantly messy hair.

While the setting of the series is different, the message and characterization mirror Abie Longstaff's original vision in Fairytale Hairdresser books, which feature salon-owner Kittie Lacey, "the facilitator and the problem-solver ... at the heart of the community" "who works hard, defeats evil-doers, [and] shows solidarity with the girls she helps."

== Characters ==
=== Main ===
- Sunny (voiced by Lilla Crawford in the US and Lily Portman in the UK) is a creative tween-aged hair stylist who runs her own salon. She has multi-colored hair (mainly blonde with pink, purple, and red streaks).
- Doodle (voiced by Rob Morrison in the US and Chris Garner in the UK) is Sunny's talking pet dog and sidekick.
- Rox (voiced by Élan Luz Rivera in the US and Abigail Wisdom in the UK) is the fun-loving hair colorist at Sunny's salon.
- Blair (voiced by Taylor Louderman in the US and Eleanor Snowdon in the UK) is the cheerful and happy-go-lucky optimist. She is a receptionist and manicurist at Sunny's salon.

=== Recurring ===
- Timmy (voiced by Kevin Duda in the US and Alan Medcroft in the UK) is one of Sunny's friends. He is in charge of events.
- Cindy (voiced by Melissa van der Schyff in the US and Imogen Sharp in the UK) is the town bakery.
- Junior (voiced by Denim Steele and Jesus Del Orden) is Rox's little brother. He is 6 in his first few appearances and turns 7 in "Clowning Around".
- Johnny-Ray (voiced by Kyle Dean Massey in the US and Geraint Thomas in the UK)

=== Villains ===
- Lacey (voiced by Sarah Stiles) is a topiary tree artist and pageant queen.
- KC (also voiced by Melissa van der Schyff) is Lacey's talking poodle.
- Scratch (voiced by Josh Ruben in the US and Geraint Thomas in the UK) is the strong-willed neighborhood animal catcher.

== Episodes ==
Season	Episodes		Originally released		
Season	Episodes		First released	Last released	Network
1	40	27	August 21, 2017	August 10, 2018	Nickelodeon
1	40	13	October 21, 2018	June 23, 2019	Nick Jr.
2	20	9	April 14, 2019	December 1, 2019	Nick Jr.
2	20	11	March 1, 2020		Amazon Prime Video

== Broadcast ==
Sunny Day debuted on Treehouse TV in Canada in September 2017 and debuted on Nick Jr. in the United Kingdom on 5 March 2018. The series debuted in Australia on Nick Jr. on 19 February 2018.

== Home media ==
Nickelodeon and Paramount Home Entertainment released the first DVD of the show with the same title on May 22, 2018. Then released a second DVD, Welcome to Pet Parlor, on September 3, 2019. On September 6, 2019, the first season was added to Paramount+, with the second season being added on September 16. It was removed from the streaming service on January 1, 2024.

== Awards and nominations ==
Year	Award	Category	Nominee	Result	Ref.
2018	Daytime Emmy Awards	Outstanding Casting for an Animated Series or Special	Sunny Day	Nominated	

== Merchandise ==
Books are released, and a toy line from Mattel was confirmed.
