= Nina Brosh =

Israeli fashion model

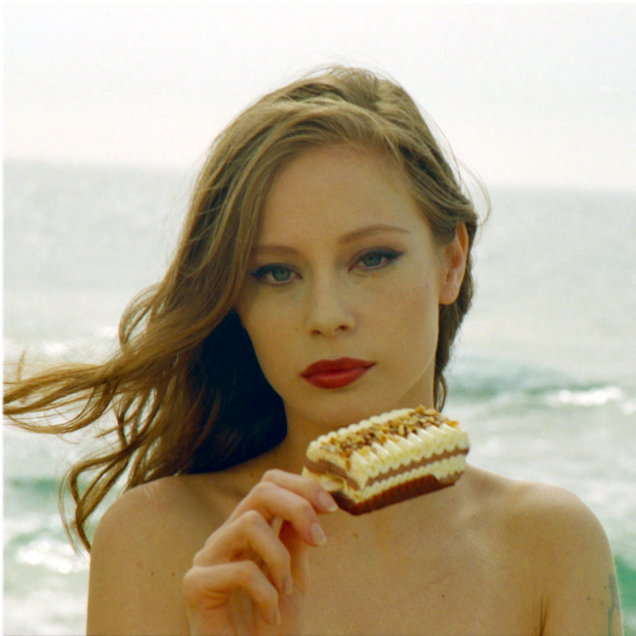
- Brosh-Vic in 1994
- Born: Ruti-Nina Brosh-Vic; November 12, 1975 (age 50); Ramat Yishai, Israel
- Other name: Vic
- Children: 2
- Modeling information
- Height: 1.73 m (5 ft 8 in)
- Hair color: Blonde
- Eye color: Blue
- Agency: IMG Models; Marilyn (Paris); Nova (Munich)

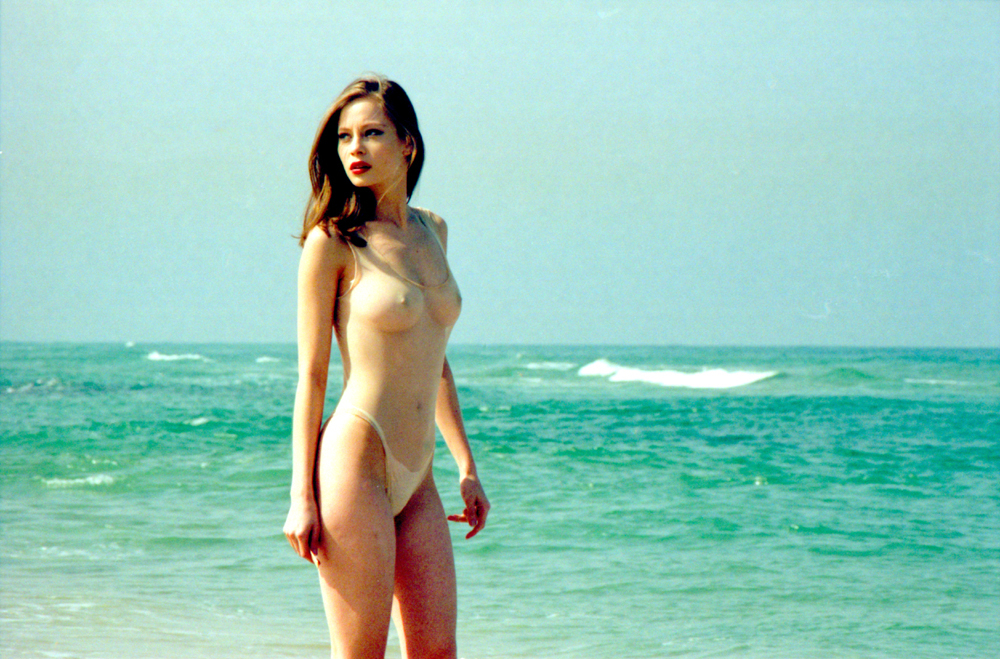
Brosh-Vic in 1994

Ruti-Nina Brosh-Vic (Hebrew: נינה ברוש; born November 12, 1975) is an Israeli model and actress.

During the 1990s, she led campaigns for brands such as Givenchy, Yves Saint Laurent, Dolce & Gabbana, Chanel, Dior, DKNY, Bebe, Dim and Miu Miu. In the 1990s, she appeared on the covers of magazines such as Vogue and Elle.

== Early life ==
Ruti-Nina Brosh-Vic was born in Ramat Yishai, Israel, to a father of Russian-Jewish descent, and to a Jewish mother who was born in China. On her father's side, she is a great-great-granddaughter of Rabbi Yehuda Leib Maimon. She was named Nina after her grandmother.

=== Modelling ===
During the 1990s, she led campaigns for brands such as Givenchy, Yves Saint Laurent, Dolce & Gabbana, DKNY, Chanel, Dior, Bebe, Dim and Miu Miu.

=== Acting ===
She starred in Duran Duran's "Femme Fatale" music video. In 1998, she appeared opposite Vincent Gallo in the independent movie Johnny 316. In 2000, she appeared opposite Katherine Moennig in the short film The Ice People.
