= List of Sunny Day episodes =

Sunny Day is an animated children's television series produced by Silvergate Media. The following is a list of episodes.

== Series overview ==
Season	Episodes		Originally released		
Season	Episodes		First released	Last released	Network
1	40	27	August 21, 2017	August 10, 2018	Nickelodeon
1	40	13	October 21, 2018	June 23, 2019	Nick Jr.
2	20	9	April 14, 2019	December 1, 2019	Nick Jr.
2	20	11	March 1, 2020		Amazon Prime Video

== Episodes ==
=== Season 1 (2017–2019) ===
No. overall	No. in season	Title	Written by	Original release date	Treehouse debut	Prod. code	U.S. viewers (millions)
Nickelodeon
1	1	"Stick With Me"	Alison Greenaway	August 21, 2017	September 2, 2017	107	0.98
Rox and Blair get stuck together with sticky hairspray. Timmy and Cindy help Sunny find the ingredients for an "unsticking" solution while Rox and Blair learn about teamwork.
2	2	"Sunny's Birthday Wish List"	Jodi Reynolds	August 23, 2017	September 3, 2017	108	1.03
Doodle, Rox, and Blair try to help Sunny with her birthday wish list while Cindy prepares a cake for her.
3	3	"Puppy Love"	Alison Greenaway	August 25, 2017	September 9, 2017	104	1.06
Doodle finds a lost puppy and enlists the help of the girls in order to prevent her from being caught by the neighborhood dogcatcher, Scratch.
4	4	"Style Swap"	Sindy Boveda Spackman & Jodi Reynolds	August 29, 2017	September 10, 2017	106	0.80
Blair and her pop star idol Mandy swap places for the day after discovering that they look almost identical.
5	5	"Sunny and the Princesses"	Brian Hohlfeld	August 31, 2017	September 16, 2017	102	0.80
When Timmy gets a job as the chauffeur for two visiting princesses, Dominica and her younger sister Annabella, Sunny and the girls bring Anabella on a tour of the town.
6	6	"Junior's Teddy Bear"	Nicole Dubuc	September 8, 2017	TBA	113	0.91
Sunny helps Rox's younger brother search for his teddy bear after it goes missing, unaware it was at the salon the entire time.
7	7	"Friendship Day"	Brian Hohlfeld	September 19, 2017 (Note: This episode was released early on iTunes on June 5, 2017 and later as a sneak preview on Nick Jr. on June 10.)	September 17, 2017	101	0.90
Doodle thinks that Sunny has forgotten about him on Friendship Day, so he runs away from the salon only to be caught by Scratch.
8	8	"Top Dog"	Jodi Reynolds	September 21, 2017	TBA	112	0.84
When Doodle enters Timmy's pet show contest, he must decide if it is more important to win or to help a friend in need.
9	9	"Messenger Mix-Up"	Kacey Arnold	October 6, 2017	TBA	111	0.67
Timmy has volunteered to deliver the mail around town, but a mix-up causes all of the packages to go to the wrong people.
10	10	"Pumpkin Pursuit"	Jodi Reynolds	October 13, 2017	TBA	114	0.76
Blair hopes to enter Timmy's costume contest, but trouble arises when Lacey steals her pumpkin costume.
11	11	"The Topi-Hairy Contest"	Brian Hohlfeld	October 20, 2017 (Note: This episode was first released as a sneak preview on Nick Jr. on July 7, 2017.)	TBA	109	0.65
Timmy is hosting a topiary sculpting contest and Sunny is excited to enter. However, when her entry is sabotaged by Lacey, Sunny uses her hair-styling skills to create a new topiary out of hair.
12	12	"The Royal Visit"	Brian Hohlfeld	October 27, 2017	TBA	110	0.81
Sunny and friends help teach the egotistical Prince Dudley how to be kind to others after Timmy is appointed to bring the prince to a royal ball.
13	13	"If Timmy Gives You Apples"	Rachel Vine	November 3, 2017	November 12, 2017	103	0.63
Timmy's enthusiasm for delivering apples start to get the best of him when the salon overflows in fruit.
14	14	"Lacey's Salon"	Melinda LaRose	November 17, 2017	TBA	117	0.70
Lacey opens up her own salon to rival Sunny's, but results become disastrous when famous opera singer Dame Tralada comes in.
15	15	"Wild Styled"	Jodi Reynolds	December 1, 2017	TBA	116	0.59
After Blair gets lost on a camping trip, Sunny and Rox use their styling tools—and skills—to find her.
16	16	"Best Christmas Ever"	Brian Hohlfeld	December 8, 2017	TBA	120	0.60
Doodle is trapped in a snowstorm when meeting his younger sister on Christmas Eve.
17	17	"Sunny Not So Simple Concert"	Jodi Reynolds	January 19, 2018	February 3, 2018	119	0.81
Sunny and the girls organize a concert for Jonny-Ray to showcase his simple things, but Sunny doesn't follow the rules.
18	18	"Clowning Around"	Jodi Reynolds	February 9, 2018	February 24, 2018	118	0.73
When Rox's cousin Lulu runs off after ruining Junior's birthday party, the girls have to find her and discover she has a special skill to save the party.
19	19	"Poodle Puff Pals"	Jodi Reynolds	March 23, 2018	March 25, 2018	121	0.71
Lacey and KC have a falling out because Lacey doesn't listen to her, and Sunny has to help the two reconcile.
20	20	"Cirque Du Sunny"	Alan Denton	April 13, 2018	June 3, 2018	122	0.66
When the circus gets postponed, Sunny and her friends start their own circus which proves to be harder than they thought.
21	21	"The Royal Portrait"	Jodi Reynolds	May 14, 2018	June 10, 2018	126	0.59
Rox is asked to make Prince Dudley's royal portrait, only for him to appoint himself.
22	22	"A Day At The Beach"	Nicole Dubuc	June 4, 2018	TBA	115	0.69
A musical duo called the Surf Bros get lost on their way to a beach concert, and Sunny and Doodle must help them get to the stage on time.
23	23	"Sleepover Surprise"	Rachel Vine	June 11, 2018	July 22, 2018	125	0.71
The girls have a slumber party at the salon, but when the fun is interrupted by a mysterious visitor, they work together to catch the culprit.
24	24	"The Forever Home"	Jodi Reynolds	June 18, 2018	August 12, 2018	127	0.83
Blair bonds with a dog at Scratch's adoption center and comes to the rescue when she gets in trouble.
25	25	"Lulu The Woodland Fairy"	Ed Valentine	June 25, 2018	August 19, 2018	128	0.76
Lulu tries to become a Woodland Fairy like Rox, but the girls' help only gets in the way.
26	26	"Sunny Squad"	Brian Hohlfeld	July 9, 2018	September 16, 2018	124	0.78
Sunny and her friends compete in a soccer match against Lacey and KC and Rox and Junior discover where their true talents lie.
27	27	"Band Together"	Rachel Vine	August 10, 2018	November 26, 2017	105	1.08
The girls form a rock band to perform in a talent show hosted by Timmy, but when Lacey threatens their fun, the girls use magic tricks to save the day.
Nick Jr.
28	28	"Timmy Big Day"	Alan Denton	October 21, 2018	TBA	132	0.35
29	29	"Pancake Party"	Rachel Vine	October 28, 2018	TBA	129	0.40
30	30	"Cindy and the Cupcake Machine"	Melinda LaRose	November 4, 2018	December 2, 2018	123	0.43
31	31	"Dance Buddies"	Kim Beyer-Johnson	November 11, 2018 (Note: This episode was first released as a sneak preview on September 2, 2018.)	September 8, 2018	130	0.42
32	32	"Skating Siblings"	Jodi Reynolds	November 18, 2018	TBA	131	0.33
33	33	"Violet's Adventure"	Jodi Reynolds	November 25, 2018	TBA	133	0.33
34	34	"A Different Duo"	Melinda LaRose	December 2, 2018	TBA	135	0.29
Johnny-Ray wins a chance to perform with rap music star Fee-B, but their styles don't mesh and they part ways; it takes Johnny-Ray helping Fee-B, Sunny and the girls out of a jam to realize what the pair can achieve.
35	35	"Jump"	Rachel Vine	January 13, 2019	TBA	138	0.44
Doodle puts on jumping shoes meant for Felix the Fearless; when he does, he's having too much fun jumping, and trying to stop is impossible to do.
36	36	"Pet Parlor"	Alan Denton	February 3, 2019	TBA	134	0.37
When the salon is overrun with pet clients, Doodle dreams up a Pet Parlor that the girls build with Timmy's help; before the salon can open, they will need to find and save Dame Tralada's dog.
37	37	"Parlor Problems"	Alison Greenaway	February 24, 2019	TBA	136	0.44
Lacey and KC step in to manage the increasingly busy Pet Parlor, but lose track of Hannah's dog, Tutu; Sunny and company must try to undo a series of mix-ups before Tutu's big show.
38	38	"A Berry Good Smell"	Kacey Arnold & Brian Hohlfeld	March 24, 2019	TBA	137	0.27
Sunny and Doodle search for a special berry that is used in an ingredient in Dame Tralada's shampoo; a bird who also is fond of the berries scoops up Her Majesty.
39	39	"3 Headed Rose"	Alison Greenaway	May 19, 2019	TBA	139	0.42
When Peter's prized flower wilts under Sunny, Rox, Blair and Doodle's watch, they head to the woods to find another.
40	40	"The Royal Wedding"	Jodi Reynolds	June 23, 2019	TBA	140	0.26
Dominica and Annabella's prince Corgi, George, bonds with a spunky, scruffy stray named Ginger; the dogs are set for a royal wedding, but Scratch interferes.

=== Season 2 (2019–2020) ===
Silvergate renewed Sunny Day for a second season. According to The Hollywood Reporter, the second season will feature a new vehicle, Groom and Vroom, which was designed only on pets, in addition to the Glam Van. In addition, Lacey and KC will also join Sunny, Doodle, Rox, and Blair to help out for the joint.

No. overall	No. in season	Title	Written by	Original release date	Treehouse debut	Prod. code	U.S. viewers (millions)
Nick Jr.
41	1	"Sunny and the Springtacular"	Ben Ward	April 14, 2019	2019	202	0.42
An excited Doodle offers to watch the famous baby chicks before the big Springtacular show; when Doodle loses track of them, he needs Sunny's help to find the chicks in time for their performance with Dame Tralada.
42	2	"Doodle the Boss"	Alan Denton	July 28, 2019	2019	201	0.23
Seeing everyone performing unique jobs at the salon inspires Doodle to start a smoothie stand; when Doodle realizes business ownership isn't for him and gets in over his head, Sunny helps bail him out.
43	3	"Monkey Business"	Jodi Reynolds	August 25, 2019	2019	203	0.32
Peter enlists Sunny and Doodle to help track down a playful monkey that was mistakenly delivered to his shop and is now loose in the town.
44	4	"Get Her to the Vet"	Alan Denton	September 15, 2019	2019	204	0.25
Rosie is nervous about her first trip to the vet, Dr. Vanessa; after a series of misunderstandings and a high-speed chase result in Rosie being stuck, Sunny, Blair and Martina must save Rosie and get her to the vet.
45	5	"Sunny and the Groom & Vroom"	Sarah Blondine Mullervy	September 29, 2019	2019	205	0.35
46	6	"Doodle and the Poodle"	Lisa Kettle	October 13, 2019	TBA	206	0.30
47	7	"Sunny-Go-Round"	Christianne Hedtke	November 3, 2019	TBA	207	0.27
48	8	"Princess Puppy Party"	Jodi Reynolds	November 17, 2019	TBA	208	0.27
49	9	"Commercial Success"	Jared Shalek	December 1, 2019	TBA	209	0.24
Amazon Prime Video
50	10	"On Thin Ice"	Kevin Burke & Chris "Doc" Wyatt	March 1, 2020	TBA	210	N/A
51	11	"Bad Hairbot Day"	Greg Hahn	March 1, 2020	TBA	213	N/A
52	12	"Blair's Appointment"	Morgan Von Ancken	March 1, 2020	TBA	211	N/A
53	13	"All At Sea"	Ben Ward	March 1, 2020	TBA	218	N/A
54	14	"Double Trouble"	Alan Denton	March 1, 2020	TBA	219	N/A
55	15	"The Flower Parade"	Alan Denton	March 1, 2020	TBA	215	N/A
56	16	"A Hairy Situation"	Ruth Morrison and Sarah Blondine Mullervy	March 1, 2020	TBA	216	N/A
57	17	"Chasing Rainbows"	Jared Shalek	March 1, 2020	TBA	212	N/A
58	18	"Blair's Day Off"	Jodi Reynolds	March 1, 2020	TBA	214	N/A
59	19	"Pin Pal"	Alan Denton	March 1, 2020	TBA	217	N/A
60	20	"Sunny and the Fireworks Festival"	Sarah Blondine Mullervy	March 1, 2020	TBA	220	N/A
The Friendly Falls Fireworks Festival has everyone buzzing. But when Sunny accidentally puts the event in jeopardy, she's got to work with her friends to make things right in time for the big fireworks show.

=== Style Files ===
Style Files are a series of live-action tutorials provided by Sunny that involve the hairstyle featured at the end of every episode.
