= Johnny 316 =

- Directed by: Erick Ifergan
- Screenplay by: K.A. Rivers
- Story by: Erick Ifergan; K.A. Rivers
- Based on: Salome by Oscar Wilde
- Produced by: Erick Ifergan; K.A. Rivers
- Starring: Vincent Gallo; Seymour Cassel; Louise Fletcher; Nina Brosh
- Cinematography: Toby Irwin
- Edited by: Katz
- Music by: Vincent Gallo
- Release date: 1998
- Running time: 77 minutes
- Language: English

Johnny 316 is a 1998 independent film from French director Erick Ifergan. The film stars Vincent Gallo, alongside Seymour Cassel, Louise Fletcher, and Nina Brosh.

== Synopsis ==
"A preacher without resources spends his days reciting Bible verses. One day he meets a young jobless girl who wanders on Hollywood Boulevard. An impossible love story begins."

== Cast ==
- Vincent Gallo as Johnny
- Seymour Cassel as Store Keeper
- Louise Fletcher as Sally's Mother
- Nina Brosh as Sally
- Melissa van der Schyff as Salome

== Production and release ==
Johnny 316 made its debut at the 1998 New York Underground Film Festival. Afterwards, the film became unavailable to watch for nine years. In 2006, the film underwent additional shooting, and was finally completed. In 2007, the film re-emerged, screening at another festival.

Following its second screening, the film continued to be unavailable to watch, until it surfaced on YouTube in 2012. Ifergan's production company, Serial Dreamer, released a new trailer for the film in 2015, advertising it as "the hidden gem of controversial actor Vincent Gallo."

== Reception ==
Robert Kohler of Variety gave the film a moderately positive review, writing that "Erick Ifergan's Johnny 316 takes Oscar Wilde's Salome and transfers it to Hollywood Boulevard. This 'Sally' never dances, but she does meander the boulevard in a movie that similarly wanders and never finds a groove, tone or point of view. The rather inspired central idea of Gallo as a modern-day John the Baptist goes undeveloped, with a ton of pretense in its wake."
