= Melissa van der Schyff =

Canadian actress (born 1995)

- Born: South Africa
- Occupations: Actress, singer, comedian, songwriter

Melissa van der Schyff (sometimes stylized Melissa Van Der Schyff) is a Canadian American award-winning actress, singer, comedian and songwriter who is best known for her work on Broadway. She was nominated for a 2012 Drama Desk Award and Outer Critics Circle Award for "Outstanding Featured Actress in a Musical" for originating the role of Blanche Barrow in the Broadway Musical Bonnie & Clyde, which opened at the Gerald Schoenfeld Theatre in New York City on 1 December 2011.

== Early life ==
Born in South Africa and raised in Canada, during her younger years, van der Schyff aspired to become a jazz singer, noting Miles Davis and John Coltrane as inspirations to her. She performed at various shows around her hometown when she was just 15 earning a General Motors Award for Excellence for Jazz Vocals as well as performing live on CBC Radio. Melissa graduated summa cum laude from the College of Santa Fe (Now named Santa Fe University of Art and Design) with her B.F.A in Acting and a Minor in Music. She also studied at The British American Drama Academy in London, England as well as with Lily Parker of the Actors Studio.

== Later career ==
Melissa worked in TV and film in Los Angeles as well as performing in many premiere west coast theaters including The Mark Taper Forum, Ahmanson Theatre, South Coast Repertory, Kirk Douglas Theatre and La Jolla Playhouse.

Her break came when Broadway director Jeff Calhoun (Newsies) cast her as Mary Jane in Deaf West Theatre's production of the musical, Big River, which later became her Broadway debut when the show transferred from Deaf West Theatre to The Mark Taper Forum in Los Angeles and then on to the Roundabout Theatre company's American Airlines Theatre on Broadway. Along with the rest of the cast, she received a 2004 Tony Honor Award for Excellence in Theatre and the show received a Tony Nomination for Best Revival. Variety magazine said she brought "unaffected charm to her brief ingenue role, vocally and dramatically" and that she was "a captivating balance of innocence and sensuality." Her vocals were compared to Dolly Parton for her country number "You Oughta Be Here With Me" by the L.A. Times, New York Times, Washington Post, Daily Variety and a host of other reviews.

She went on to star in another Deaf West Theatre and Center Theatre Group production, as Catherine in Pippin at the Mark Taper Forum in Los Angeles, which was described by the Hollywood Reporter as "...an exceptionally eloquent and moving performance." Melissa had to learn sign language for her role, as the show was performed simultaneously in ASL and English.

Other plays she has acted in include originating the role of Virginia/Clara in the South Coast Repertory's World Premiere of An Italian Straw Hat, originating the role of Yelenka in the La Jolla Playhouse's World Premiere musical Zhivago directed by Des McAnuff, originating the role of Ginny in the staged musical workshop of Post Office at the Kirk Douglas Theatre which was composed by Michael Friedman of Bloody Bloody Andrew Jackson and directed by Mark Brokaw, Ballad which earned her an Ovation Award nomination and a Drama-Logue Award, Pud in the West Coast Premiere of Horton Foote's Laura Dennis and The Transformation of Benno Blimpie at the McCadden Place Theatre which earned her a spot in Entertainment Today's top ten talents to watch out for in L.A.

=== Bonnie and Clyde ===
Big River and Pippin director, Jeff Calhoun, cast van der Schyff as Blanche Barrow in the very first reading of the world premiere Frank Wildhorn musical "Bonnie and Clyde" when it was just half a script and a few songs. She went on to develop her role at The La Jolla Playhouse for which she earned a 2009 Craig Noel Award for Outstanding Featured Actress in a Musical, the Asolo Repertory Theatre in Sarasota, Florida and finally on Broadway at the Gerald Schoenfeld Theatre where she was nominated for a Drama Desk Award and Outer Critics Circle Award. The New York Times praised her voice and said she had performed the show's best song, which is "a slender, shimmering hymn to small and ordinary pleasures", and The Faster Times named her as one of the best singers of the show. Playbill Editor Blake Ross named van der Schyff singing "That's What You Call A Dream" in Bonnie and Clyde as one of his 2011 Unforgettable Experiences.

Time Out New York said "Melissa van der Schyff, as goody two shoes Blanche Barrow...is a wow throughout with a voice like a country stream..." while Variety raved "...giving a standout performance is Melissa van der Schyff, singing and acting commandingly as Clyde's sister-in law Blanche."

The New York Observer's Rex Reed wrote: "...holding her own corner of the stage in every scene is Melissa van der Schyff, a knockout belter...she plays the sympathetic and pivotal role of Blanche Barrow, the wife of Clyde's brother Buck and a woman who sacrifices her ideals and self-respect for love...she stops the show as a kind of operatic Dolly Parton, while the audience begs for more."

=== Television and film ===
Melissa van der Schyff has also acted in several films, including Ashton Kutcher's A Lot Like Love where she plays Kutcher's sister-in-law, the Showtime original movie The Great Commission and was featured as herself in Broadway the Movie. van der Schyff also starred as Tina Carso on the TV series Chicago Hope and worked as voice-over artist on The Muppets, Rubber Chicken Cards, and various commercials, jingles and animation projects. She was cast as a series regular and sketch writer on the National Lampoon Lemmings in which she performed many sketches she wrote, as well as numerous celebrity impressions. Original Lemming members included John Belushi, Christopher Guest and Chevy Chase. Melissa was also cast as a series lead in the MTV pilot The Whitey Show which was produced by Seinfeld's Jason Alexander. She voices the Yodeling Yogurt in "Young Norville", a Wallykazam! episode.

=== Music ===
van der Schyff is also an award-winning songwriter and singer, and was voted Artist of the Year by Femmusic.com and nominated for an Independent Music Award for her single, "Divine". She co-wrote songs for the feature film The Legend of Tillamook's Gold and the Showtime original film, The Great Commission.

=== Video game ===
She voiced Samantha Muldoon in the 2013 video game Grand Theft Auto V and also performed "I Like Things Just The Way They Are" ingame radio. She also appeared in Lego Dimensions as the voice of Jillian Holtzmann from Ghostbusters.

== Filmography ==
=== Film ===
- 1998 Johnny 316 – Salome

=== Television ===
- 2022–2024 Alice's Wonderland Bakery – Jojo (voice)
- 2017–2019 Sunny Day – Cindy, KC (voices)

=== Videogames ===
- 2023 Warcraft Rumble – Lady Vespria (voice)
- 2022 Diablo Immortal – Leigh (voice)
- 2015 Lego Dimensions – Jillian Holtzmann (voice)
- 2013 Grand Theft Auto V – Samantha Muldoon, The Local Population (voices)
