= Abie Longstaff =

Australian children's book author

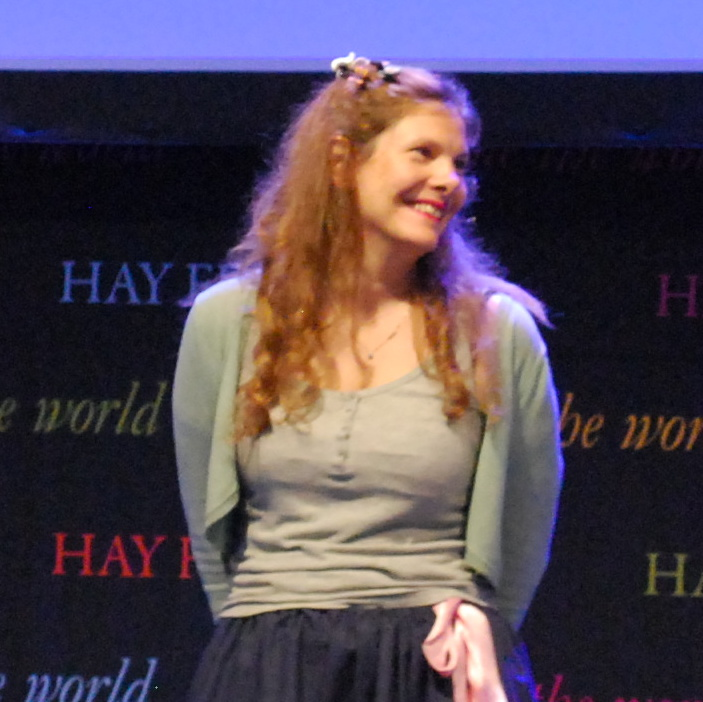
- Longstaff being introduced at the Hay Festival in 2017
- Born: Australia
- Occupation: Author
- Writing career
- Language: English
- Genre: Children's fiction
- Notable work: The Fairytale Hairdresser
- Website: www.abielongstaff.com

Abie Longstaff is an Australian-born British author of children's fiction known for The Fairytale Hairdresser picture book series, illustrated by Lauren Beard, as well as books for older children and educational books for schools.

== Early life and career ==
Longstaff was raised in Australia and lived in Hong Kong and France before relocating to England, where she resides today. She lives in Hove. Before becoming a writer Longstaff was a barrister and a legal policy analyst with an interest in policing.

== Writing career ==
Longstaff appears in the British Library’s current list of the "Top 500 Most Borrowed Authors" at number 192.

Along with illustrator Lauren Beard, she is the winner of the Never Too Young Award for the best book for children under four for The Mummy Shop.

Longstaff was a judge for the Amnesty (Carnegie) CILIP 2018 Commendation which was eventually won by Angie Thomas's The Hate U Give. In 2019 she was elected to the Management Committee of the Society of Authors

=== Television ===
The Nickelodeon children's television series Sunny Day, produced by Silvergate Media, is based on Longstaff's The Fairytale Hairdresser books.

== Critical reception ==
Longstaff's fiction incorporates the genre and associated tropes of fairy tales and magic, frequently offset with modern settings and humour.

Her Fairytale Hairdresser books have been described as giving ‘a new spin on a traditional fairy tale’. The Guardian called them considerably more nuanced and subversive than they appear on the surface and they are known for their positive representation of diversity and multiculturalism.

Longstaff's books for older children make use of historical references, and complex literary elements such as footnotes and non-fiction material, alongside characters who are ‘brave and smart and inspirational’.

== Books ==
=== Picture books ===
- Pirate House Swap, illustrated by Mark Chambers: Random House (2011)
- The Mummy Shop, illustrated by Lauren Beard: Scholastic (2013)
- Just the Job for Dad, illustrated by Lauren Beard: Scholastic (2014)
- We’re having a Super Baby! illustrated by Jane Massey: Scholastic (2015)
- Superhero Hotel, illustrated by Migy Blanco: Scholastic (2017)

==== The Fairytale Hairdresser series ====
- The Fairytale Hairdresser and Rapunzel, illustrated by Lauren Beard: Random House (2011)
- The Fairytale Hairdresser and Cinderella, illustrated by Lauren Beard: Random House (2012)
- The Fairytale Hairdresser and Sleeping Beauty, illustrated by Lauren Beard: Random House (2013)
- The Fairytale Hairdresser and Snow White, illustrated by Lauren Beard: Random House (2014)
- The Fairytale Hairdresser and Father Christmas, illustrated by Lauren Beard: Random House (2014)
- The Fairytale Hairdresser and the Little Mermaid, illustrated by Lauren Beard: Random House (2015)
- The Fairytale Hairdresser and the Sugar Plum Fairy, illustrated by Lauren Beard: Random House (2015)
- The Fairytale Hairdresser and Beauty and the Beast, illustrated by Lauren Beard: Random House (2016)
- The Fairytale Hairdresser and the Princess and the Pea, illustrated by Lauren Beard: Random House (2016)
- The Fairytale Hairdresser and Aladdin, illustrated by Lauren Beard: Random House (2017)
- The Fairytale Hairdresser and the Princess and the Frog, illustrated by Lauren Beard: Random House (2018)
- The Fairytale Hairdresser and Thumbelina, illustrated by Lauren Beard.
- The Fairytale Hairdresser and Red Riding Hood, illustrated by Lauren Beard.

=== Chapter books ===
- The Magic Potions Shop: The Young Apprentice, illustrated by Lauren Beard: Random House (2015)
- The Magic Potions Shop: The River Horse, illustrated by Lauren Beard: Random House (2015)
- The Magic Potions Shop: The Blizzard Bear, illustrated by Lauren Beard: Random House (2016)
- The Magic Potions Shop: The Lightning Pup, illustrated by Lauren Beard: Random House (2016)
- The Magic Potions Shop: The Firebird, illustrated by Lauren Beard: Random House (2017)
- The Magic Potions Shop: The Emerald Dragon, illustrated by Lauren Beard: Random House (2017)

=== Fiction for older children ===
- The Trapdoor Mysteries: A Sticky Situation, illustrated by James Brown: Hachette (2016)
- The Trapdoor Mysteries: The Scent of Danger, illustrated by James Brown: Hachette (2018)
- How to Catch a Witch: Scholastic (2016)
- How to Bewitch a Wolf: Scholastic (2017)

=== Books for schools ===
- The Malice Family, illustrated by Sholto Walker: Pearson (2011)
- The Snow Queen, illustrated by Michael Foreman: HarperCollins (2013)
- Rumpelstiltskin, illustrated by Caroline Romanet: HarperCollins (2015)
- The Wizard of Oz, illustrated by Louise Pigott: HarperCollins (2015)
- We Want a Dog! Illustrated by Mar Ferrero: OUP (2017)
- Sometimes Mum is Silly, illustrated by Natalie Eldred: OUP (2017)
