= Brianne Drouhard =

American animator and comic artist

- Born: July 10, 1980 (age 46); Othello, Washington, U.S.
- Education: California Institute of the Arts
- Occupations: Animator, storyboard artist, comic book artist, director
- Years active: 2004–present
- Notable work: Teen Titans; Harpy Gee

Brianne Drouhard (born July 10, 1980) is an American animator, storyboard artist, director, and comic book artist, known for her book Billie the Unicorn and her webcomic, Harpy Gee. Drouhard has been involved in animation since 2004, when she was a character designer for the Teen Titans TV series. Her current projects include the upcoming Golden Axe show, Harpy Gee and Boom! Studios' Mega Princess. She will be the co-executive producer for the upcoming Starfire show.

Drouhard has contributed to several television series, including The Avengers: Earth's Mightiest Heroes, Class of 3000, Out of Jimmy's Head, Pig Goat Banana Cricket, and Santiago of the Seas. She also directed and produced the TV short Amethyst, Princess of Gemworld.

== Early life ==
Drouhard was born on July 10, 1980, in Othello, Washington to Noran (née Bones) and Brian Drouhard, a farmer. She attended the California State Summer School for the Arts and the Character Animation Program at the California Institute of the Arts.

== Career ==
Drouhard worked as a character designer on various animated TV shows throughout the 2000s, such as Scooby-Doo! Mystery Incorporated and Teen Titans. While she was working on Batman: The Brave and the Bold from 2008 to 2011, DC Comics announced the formation of DC Nation Shorts to everyone working in the animation department at Warner Bros. Looking at the list of characters that Drouhard could present a pitch for, the character of Amethyst stood out to her, even though she did not know the character well. Drouhard had already been pitching her Harpy Gee concept for several years at this point, and presented it as an alternative after her Amethyst pitch. However, DC liked Drouhard's concept episodes more than expected, and she was told to write even more episodes.

Drouhard began posting her fantasy webcomic Harpy Gee in January 2014. Following the adventurer Harpy and her goblin cat, Drouhard switches up her storytelling style and artistic processes rapidly during the creation of Harpy Gee. Lauren Davis of io9 listed it among her favorite webcomics of 2014. A Nick animated short was produced for the show as part of the Nickelodeon Animated Shorts Program.

Collaborating with Kelly Thompson, Drouhard created the comic book Mega Princess in 2016, which follows the adventures of princess Maxime and her pony Justine who go to rescue her younger brother. Published by Kaboom!, Mega Princess has a younger target-audience.
