= Johnny Ryan =

American alternative comics creator, writer and animator (born 1970)

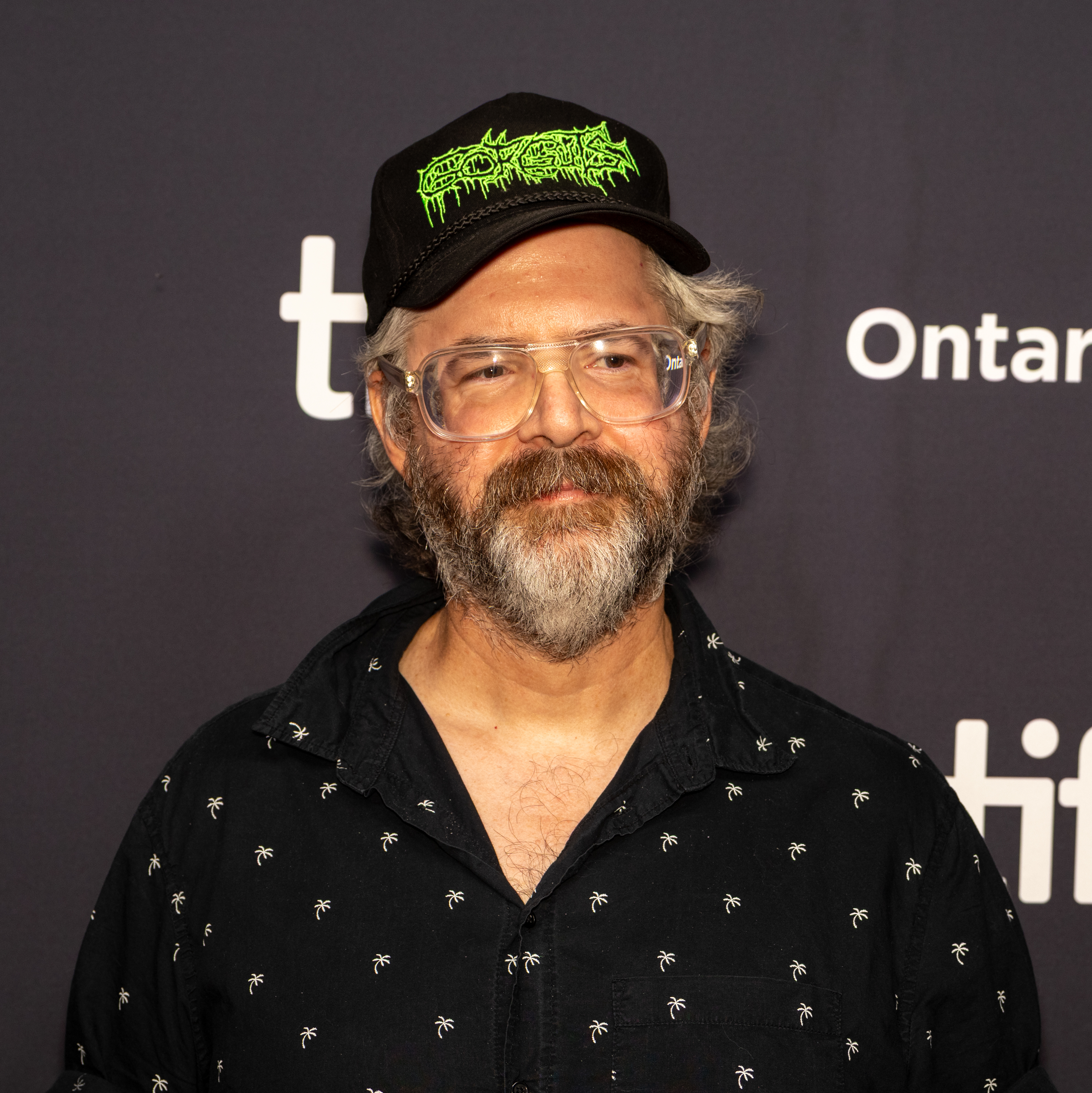
- Ryan at TIFF 2025
- Born: John F. Ryan IV; November 30, 1970 (age 55) Boston, Massachusetts, U.S.
- Areas: Cartoonist, Writer
- Pseudonym: Hector Mumbly
- Notable works: Angry Youth Comix; Blecky Yuckerella; Prison Pit

John F. Ryan IV (born November 30, 1970, in Boston, Massachusetts) is an American alternative comics creator, writer, and animator. He created Angry Youth Comix, a comic book published by Fantagraphics, and "Blecky Yuckerella", a comic strip which originated in the alternative newspaper the Portland Mercury and now appears on Ryan's website. He also created Pig Goat Banana Cricket, a TV show made jointly with Dave Cooper that Nickelodeon picked up. He was the story editor for Looney Tunes Cartoons. In a throwback to the days of underground comix, Ryan's oeuvre is generally an attempt to be as shocking and irreverent as possible.

== Career ==
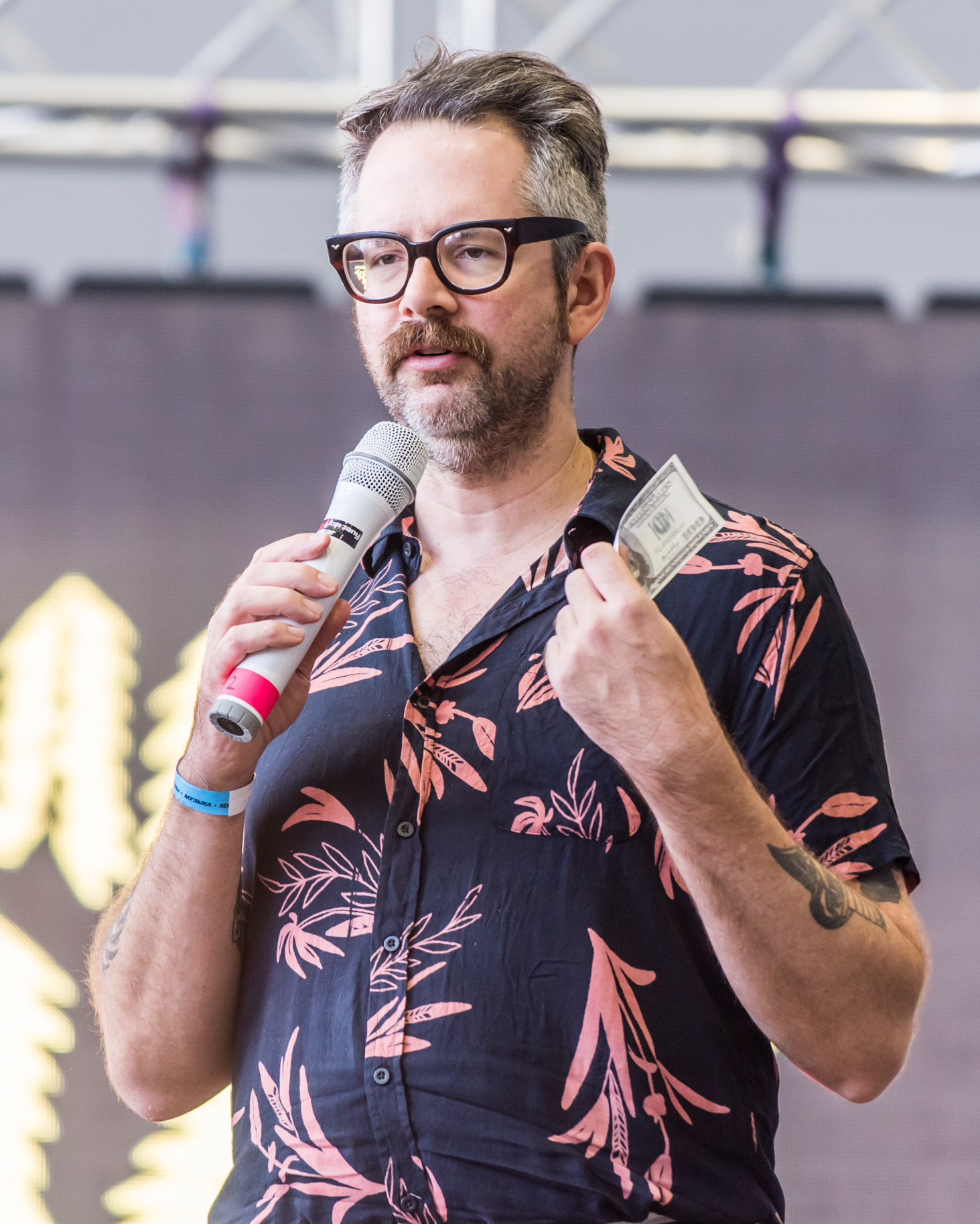
Johnny Ryan at Bigfest Lite (2018)

Ryan originally self-published Angry Youth Comix, producing eleven mini-comic issues from 1994 to 1998. In 1998, he began showing his work to Peter Bagge, creator of Hate comics, who introduced the material to Eric Reynolds of Fantagraphics. In 2001, Fantagraphics began publishing volume 2 of the series.

Collaborating with Dave Cooper under the pen name "Hector Mumbly", Ryan's comics appeared in nearly every issue of Nickelodeon Magazine, including the May 2005 issue, where they created a comic called “Cupcake Of Time”, including which it featured a Pig, A Banana, a Robot and a Toliet, which was a precursor of Pig Goat Banana Cricket. Cooper and Ryan also collaborated on a "Wonder Woman vs. Supergirl" story for the DC Comics anthology Bizarro. Ryan collaborated with Peter Bagge in both Angry Youth Comix and Bagge's Hate Annual, in addition to penciling and inking two stories for Bagge's DC series Sweatshop. In 2006, Ryan guest-edited a special comics issue of Vice magazine, which included contributions from over thirty of Ryan's comics contemporaries. Ryan contributed comics to Marvel's 2009 anthology Strange Tales.

Ryan's illustrations have appeared in MAD, LA Weekly, National Geographic Kids, Hustler Magazine, The Stranger, and elsewhere. Ryan has also done work for clients such as Nobleworks greetings cards, Rhino Records, and Fox TV. His comics have been translated into Spanish, Portuguese, and French.

== Awards ==
Angry Youth Comix was nominated for a Best Mini Ignatz Award at the 2000 Small Press Expo. It has since been nominated for multiple Harvey and Eisner Awards. "Prison Pit" won an award for "Best Lettering" at the Stumptown small press festival in Portland, OR in April 2011.

== Personal life ==
Ryan grew up in Boston and studied English literature at the University of Massachusetts Amherst. Ryan lives in Los Angeles. He has one daughter.

== Bibliography and filmography ==
=== Fantagraphics ===
- Angry Youth Comix #1-14 (2000-2008) collected in:
  - Portajohnny: The Best of Angry Youth Comix: The Early Years (2003) ISBN 1-56097-547-4
  - What're You Lookin' At?: Volume I of the Collected Angry Youth Comix (2004) ISBN 1-56097-621-7
  - Johnny Ryan's XXX Scumbag Party: Volume II of the Collected Angry Youth Comix (2007) ISBN 1-56097-867-8
  - Take A Joke: Volume III of the Collected Angry Youth Comix (2011) ISBN 1-60699-464-6
  - Angry Youth Comix (2015) ISBN 978-1-60699-811-3 - Complete Collection Hardcover Omnibus of all 14 issues of series.
- Shouldn't You Be Working? #1-2 (2003-2004)
- Blecky Yuckerella, originally serialized in the Portland Mercury and Vice Magazine, collected in:
  - Blecky Yuckerella (2005) ISBN 1-56097-674-8
  - Blecky Yuckerella: Back in Bleck (2007) ISBN 1-56097-790-6
  - Comics Are For Idiots (2009) ISBN 1-56097-974-7 — Blecky Yuckerella collection
  - Blecky Yuckerella: "Fuc- --u, -ss --le" (2011) ISBN 1-60699-415-8
- Prison Pit #1-6 (2009-2018) collected in:
  - Prison Pit: The Complete Collection (2020) ISBN 978-1-68396-313-4
- A New Low (2017) ISBN 978-1-68396-004-1 - Collection of cartoons featured on Vice News.
- Porn Basket (2021) ISBN 978-1-68396-501-5 - Collection of Sketchbook drawings.
- Barely Human (2022) ISBN 978-1-68396-559-6 - Collection of Instagram drawings.
- Fatcop (2024) ISBN 9781683969228

=== The Mansion Press ===
- Johnny Ryan's Wet Market #1-3 (2023-2024)
- The Tales of Terror
  - Fuck My Son (2023)
  - Maniac Army (2023)
  - Who Raped My Horse? (2024) ISBN 978-2-492646-40-9
  - Campground Slut (2025)
  - 56th Street Maggots (2026)

=== Other Publishers ===
- The Comic Book Holocaust (Buenaventura Press, 2006) ISBN 0-9766848-9-6
- The Klassic Komics Klub (Buenaventura Press, 2007) ISBN 0-9800039-2-X
- New Character Parade (Pigeon Press, 2010) ISBN 978-1-93544-308-7

=== Television and filmography (partial) ===
- MAD (2012), episodes "I Am Lorax / Modern Family Circus" (additional designer, writer), "Potions 11 / Moves Like Jabba" (additional design)
- Pig Goat Banana Cricket (2015-2018) (creator, voice actor, co-executive producer)
- Johnny Ryan's Prison Pit (2014) (writer) - animated adaptation of comic book.
- JJ Villard's Fairy Tales (2020) (writer, creative consultant)
- Looney Tunes Cartoons (2020-2024) (writer)
- Funny Pages (2022) (Art department)
- The Day the Earth Blew Up: A Looney Tunes Movie (2024) (writer)
- Fuck My Son! (2025) (based on the comic book by)
