= Lauren Beard =

British children's book illustrator

Lauren Beard is a British children's book illustrator best known for illustrating 'The Fairytale Hairdresser' series written by Abie Longstaff, published by Penguin Random House. She is from Manchester, England and graduated from Loughborough University in 2006.

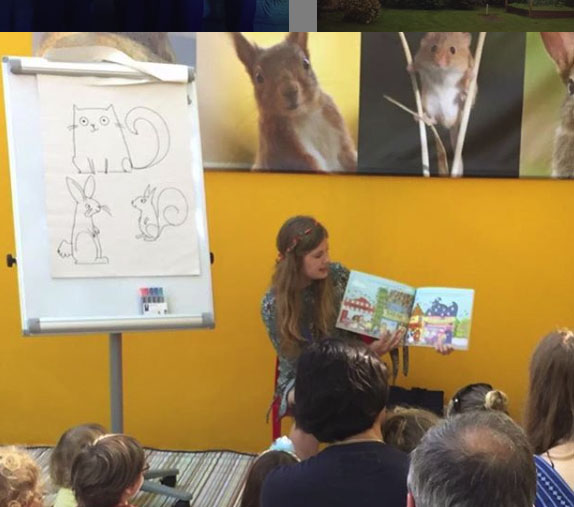
Lauren Beard illustrator

== Picture books ==
- The Mummy Shop, written by Abie Longstaff, illustrated by Lauren Beard: Scholastic (2013)
- Just the Job for Dad, written by Abie Longstaff, illustrated by Lauren Beard: Scholastic (2014)
- Princess Milly's Mixed Up Magic - The Birthday Surprise written by Clemecy Pearce, illustrated by Lauren Beard
- Princess Milly's Mixed Up Magic - The Fancy dress festival written by Clemecy Pearce, illustrated by Lauren Beard
- Princess Milly's Mixed Up Magic - The Ballerina Ball written by Clemecy Pearce, illustrated by Lauren Beard

=== The Fairytale Hairdresser series ===
- The Fairytale Hairdresser and Rapunzel, written by Abie Longstaff, illustrated by Lauren Beard: Random House (2011)
- The Fairytale Hairdresser and Cinderella, written by Abie Longstaff, illustrated by Lauren Beard: Random House (2012)
- The Fairytale Hairdresser and Sleeping Beauty, written by Abie Longstaff, illustrated by Lauren Beard: Random House (2013)
- The Fairytale Hairdresser and Snow White, written by Abie Longstaff, illustrated by Lauren Beard: Random House (2014)
- The Fairytale Hairdresser and Father Christmas, written by Abie Longstaff, illustrated by Lauren Beard: Random House (2014)
- The Fairytale Hairdresser and the Little Mermaid, written by Abie Longstaff, illustrated by Lauren Beard: Random House (2015)
- The Fairytale Hairdresser and the Sugar Plum Fairy, written by Abie Longstaff, illustrated by Lauren Beard: Random House (2015)
- The Fairytale Hairdresser and Beauty and the Beast, written by Abie Longstaff, illustrated by Lauren Beard: Random House (2016)
- The Fairytale Hairdresser and the Princess and the Pea, written by Abie Longstaff, illustrated by Lauren Beard: Random House (2016)
- The Fairytale Hairdresser and Aladdin, written by Abie Longstaff, illustrated by Lauren Beard: Random House (2017)
- The Fairytale Hairdresser and the frog princess, written by Abie Longstaff, illustrated by Lauren Beard: Random House
- The Fairytale Hairdresser and Thumbelina, written by Abie Longstaff, illustrated by Lauren Beard: Random House

== Chapter books ==
- The Magic Potions Shop: The Young Apprentice, written by Abie Longstaff, illustrated by Lauren Beard: Random House (2015)
- The Magic Potions Shop: The River Horse, written by Abie Longstaff, illustrated by Lauren Beard: Random House (2015)
- The Magic Potions Shop: The Blizzard Bear, written by Abie Longstaff, illustrated by Lauren Beard: Random House (2016)
- The Magic Potions Shop: The Lightning Pup, written by Abie Longstaff, illustrated by Lauren Beard: Random House (2016)
- The Magic Potions Shop: The Firebird, written by Abie Longstaff, illustrated by Lauren Beard: Random House (2017)
- The Magic Potions Shop: The Emerald Dragon, written by Abie Longstaff, illustrated by Lauren Beard: Random House (2017)
