= Pig Goat Banana Cricket =

American animated television series (2015–2018)

- Poster featuring the main characters in order
- Also known as: Pig Goat Banana Cricket!
- Genre: Comedy
- Created by: Dave Cooper; Johnny Ryan
- Based on: Pig Goat Banana Mantis! (2012)
- Developed by: David Sacks; Johnny Ryan; Dave Cooper
- Voices of: Matt Jones Candi Milo Thomas F. Wilson Paul Rugg
- Theme music composer: David Burns
- Opening theme: Pig Goat Banana Cricket
- Composer: David Burns
- Country of origin: United States
- Original language: English
- No. of series: 2
- No. of episodes: 40 (list of episodes)

Production
- Executive producers: Johnny Ryan; David Sacks; Dave Cooper
- Producer: Louis J. Cuck
- Editor: Joelle Kristy
- Running time: 22 minutes
- Production company: Nickelodeon Animation Studio

Original release
- Network: Nickelodeon
- Release: July 16, 2015 – February 26, 2016
- Network: Nicktoons
- Release: September 25, 2016 – August 11, 2018

Pig Goat Banana Cricket, also abbreviated as PGBC, is an American animated television series created by Dave Cooper and Johnny Ryan for Nickelodeon. The show follows the interwoven adventures of the titular quartet. It premiered on July 16, 2015, as a sneak preview after the 2015 Kids' Choice Sports. It officially premiered two days later on July 18, 2015.

== Plot ==
Pig Goat Banana Cricket focuses on the titular quartet, a group of anthropomorphic best friends and roommates: Pig, who is obsessed with pickles, Goat, who has musical dreams, Banana, who loves video games and Cricket, who is talented at mad science. The four embark on surreal journeys on their own, which are then interwoven together. The show is set in Boopelite City, a gigantic and whirring metropolis where many of the buildings look like archaic clockworks. The streets are constantly teeming with characters of intensely varied description, and the sidewalks are crammed with anthropomorphic animals, robots, anthropomorphic foods, anthropomorphic sea creatures, and more. The four roommates live in a treehouse, which sits in the middle of the city, surrounded by the forest, the seas and anywhere else the friends could possibly go.

== Episodes ==
Season	Episodes		Originally released		
Season	Episodes		First released	Last released	Network
Pilot			August 13, 2012		Vimeo
1	26	20	July 16, 2015	February 26, 2016	Nickelodeon
1	26	6	September 25, 2016	November 13, 2016	Nicktoons
2	14		November 20, 2016	August 11, 2018	Nicktoons

== Characters ==
=== Main ===
- Pignatius "Pig" Abalonea Plutonius XIV (voiced by Matt Jones) is a dimwitted anthropomorphic pig who has a large liking for pickles. Pig is the "fool" of the group and causes most of their problems. Pig is hardly able to read by himself. He says "That's my favorite!", often when he sees something or someone he likes. Pig is resistant to what would normally be life-threatening injuries.
- Goat (voiced by Candi Milo) is a sweet and cheerful anthropomorphic goat girl who has been Pig's roommate for the past 29 years. She is the "artist" of the group being able to play the guitar and having a penchant for acting. Goat can be very easily irritated by others' antics and often displays anger, causing her to babble, speak gibberish, and occasionally puff up her chest when angry (e.g. "Flib flabbin' flibble flubbin!"). Her catchphrase is "Totally goatally", which she says when she agrees with something. Goat has normal human-shaped ears (not goat-shaped) normally obscured underneath the locks of hair on the sides of her head (as seen in Steak Bus). The horns on top of her head have holes in them.
- Banana (voiced by Thomas F. Wilson) is a lazy, selfish anthropomorphic banana who enjoys playing video games. He has Boy Scouts for henchmen. Banana is the "wise-guy" of the group who loves to have fun and pull pranks. Banana is afraid of primates of all species, because they eat his kind. Banana tends to cry when put into pressure but quickly stops. He says "Sweet mama's monkeys" when he is surprised or shocked, and "simpledy doo" after finishing a task.
- Cricket (voiced by Paul Rugg) is an anthropomorphic cricket (a mantis in the pilot and robot in the comic) who is a genius inventor and speaks with a lisp. Cricket is the "brains" of the group. He is also the most responsible of the four and usually is forced to clean up their messes. Cricket has a crush on Goat, and while she has hugged him (and Banana/Pig simultaneously) and said she loves him, this can simply be behavior towards a friend. He sometimes says "Holy laser farts", when he is surprised or shocked.

=== Recurring ===
- Burgerstein is Cricket's lab assistant. He has a hamburger for a head and is made up of machines and other things. As his name implies, he is based on Frankenstein's Monster. He is called a "burgerbrain" by Cricket often, and Burgerstein grunts or babbles to express his intentions. In some episodes, Burgerstein temporarily becomes smart due to Cricket's inventions.
- Goat's reflection is seen in many episodes as Goat looks in the mirror often for self-admiration or grooming. She is eventually revealed to be a distinct entity, and she and Goat get into an argument when TJ gives the reflection the 'Customer of the Day' award even though it was Goat who got him a soufflé.
- Thomas Jefferson (later nicknamed TJ) debuts in "The Chronicles of Cutesachusetts" where he emerges from a nickel to battle Goat, and later saves the day by battling Lady Primavera. He later runs a smoothie café in "Zombie Broheims" where he prevents Goat from being Customer of the Day because he swore to hate her forever. While discussing cookies she made, he calls Betsy Ross a hag.
- Sleazy Beave is a beaver who debuted in "Fudge-pocalypse". Sleazy Beave is open to pretty much anything as he is nearly homeless. He was willingly about to marry Delooney Hamshank (by the force of Ma Hamshank) but was then pranked by Pig who was wearing the wedding outfit. He appears to have a secondary superhero personality named The Masked Maniac as well.
- Rasta Rat is a very laid-back Jamaican-accented rat who has dreadlocks. He wears a green, red, and yellow beanie hat. A running gag is he constantly gets slammed onto the fourth wall.
- President of the Planet is a dog in a business suit who rules the entire planet. He can be a noble person when he wants to be, but can also be quite brute and honest in his opinions, like when he told Goat that her superpower was complete garbage without a second thought in "Super Space Meatball".
- The Junior Rangers are the "boy scout" division of the Boopelite park rangers. They are a group of children varying in species who do various activities like real life Boy Scouts. They are watched over by Banana, who often lazes on the job. Some of the rangers do work for Banana that differs from normal activities, such as pranking the Hamshanks or rescuing Banana from Big Ballah Koala.
  - Ranger Rex
  - Barton is a rat.
  - Tom and Tabitha are crocodiles.
  - Junior Ranger Elephant is a pink elephant. Banana calls him Greg.
  - Junior Ranger Sneezy
- Ranger Slothbones is a sloth who was a former ranger scout leader.
- Junior Ranger Kyle is a dog who got left behind.
- Ranger Rhino is a rhinoceros who is in charge of the Junior Rangers. He often tells off Banana for not doing his duty but still has a soft spot for him, such as in "Wheelbarrow Full of Nachos" where he asks Banana to hang out with him.
- Breakfast Burrito – a very lazy burrito. For example, in "The Chronicles of Cutesachusetts", Banana simply asked him to put away a jar of peanut butter, only for him to immediately sit on his couch and fall asleep.
- Armpit Willy is an alligator who wears a seamed cap and has thick, long armpit hairs. His catchphrase is "Bushy bushy".
- Lady Primavera Van de Snuggles is an evil green rabbit princess who debuts in "The Chronicles of Cutesachusetts" where she tricks Pig into hunting the skunkataurs while taking over their land and returns in "Gauntlet of Humiliation", where she makes a cameo appearance by visiting Armpit Willy at his pool when Pig makes a fast food delivery to him.
- Calvin Clam is an arrogant clam that works as a fashion designer at the "Calvin Clam Underpants Factory", despite the fact that he is allergic to underwear, he is a parody of Calvin Klein.
- Lipstick Horse is an evil white horse who debuts in "Super Space Meatball" where he steals people's groceries.
- Time Donut is a donut that runs through time to steal whatever he wants and partners with Lipstick Horse.
- Prince Mermeow is a mermaid-cat hybrid that rules Catlantis who debuts in Pig Goat Banana Cricket High Five.
- Angry Old Raisin is an elderly male raisin who rides a scooter.
- Owl Woman Lady is the mother of Angry Old Raisin.
- Clerk McGirk
- That's messed up son Koala is a deep-voiced koala whose catchphrase is "Now that's messed up son".
- Shragger is a dog who is a security guard and biker of the Picklemart.
- He's So Crazy Squirrel
- Tony Towel is a repairman who uses a magic towel.
- Jorts Duck is a business duck who runs a jorts store and tricks Cricket into wearing them so he can escape in "Mall Ya Later".
- Vice President of the Planet
- Lila Twinklepipes
- Lord Garglemouth
- Psychopath Giraffe

== Voice cast ==
- Matt Jones as Pig, He So Crazy Squirrel, Dog Truck, Mama Cart, Cart Pups
- Candi Milo as Goat, JR Tom, JR Kyle, Owl Woman Lady, Back-up Singers, Geek, Dakota, Additional Voices
- Thomas F. Wilson as Banana, Bodybuilder, Chef, Beefy Teamster #2, Additional Voices
- Paul Rugg as Cricket, Cricket's Brain, Pickle Statue, Man with Tie, Aide (1), Aide (2), Additional Voices

=== Additional voices ===
- Kurtwood Smith as Angry Old Raisin
- Jeff Bennett as Rasta Rat, Pirate Leader, Sleazy Beave, Angler Fish, Mr. Manelli, Ranger Rhino, Pickle Mascot, Time Donut, Doctor, Clerk McGuirk, Banana's Brothers, Additional Voices
- Vanessa Marshall as JR Kyle, Melba, Mary Louise Pizzagut, Woman, Angry Old Raisin's Mother, Additional Voices
- Maile Flanagan as JR Barton, JR Elephant, Clerk, Dino Lady, Bruce, Additional Voices
- John DiMaggio as Pig's Dad, Burgerstein, Armpit Willy, Bank Robber, Breakfast Burrito, The Shragger, Additional Voices
- Tom Kenny as Pig's Mom, Quandarious Cooch, Gunk Knuckler, Steve, Earthworm
- James Adomian as President of the Planet, Mailbox, Baby Hamshank Demon, Head Zombie, Digestive Enzymes, Additional Voices
- Fred Tatasciore as Thomas Jefferson, Mold, Ranger Rex, Weightlifter, Talking Pickle, Jehosephat, Additional Voices
- Justin Roiland as Psychopath Giraffe, Radical Rick, Customer
- Carl Faruolo as That's Messed Up Son Koala, Broccoli, Sun (1), Wanda, Additional Voices
- Nika Futterman as Junior Ranger, Fan on Bus, Sun (2), Girl (3), Mariachi Possum
- Yuri Lowenthal as JR Sneezy, Prince Mermeow of Catlantis, Awesome Shoes, Fox
- Grey Griffin as Sleeping Kid
- Eric Bauza as Avocado, Mantis, Cow
- Eric Edelstein as Timmy, Painting #2, Painting #3
- Echo Kellum as Guitar, Lil' Doctor Dirty
- Rob Paulsen as Early Bird, Cousin Eel, Hands, Barbershop Quartet, Jebediah, Nice Dog, Co-Worker, Townsperson #1
- Danny Jacobs as Barbershop Quartet, Cuddles, Jr., Lasagna, Townperson #2
- James Urbaniak as Nose Picker Fish
- Dyana Liu as Lady Primavera Van de Snuggles, Tiny Goosey, B-Girl
- Debra Wilson as Nasty Cat, Mrs. Manelli, Lady Fart, Nerd #1
- Nolan North as Lipstick Horse, P. Pickles Pickleman, Boy, Whale, Penguin, Santa, Big Balla Koala, Additional Voices
- Gary Anthony Williams as DJ Wheelbarrow Full of Nachos, Tubey Dude Stand, Cyborg, Coach McGinty, Additional Voices
- Kari Wahlgren as Ashley, Ranger Mom, Miss Smileybells, Tofu Jones, Wheat Germ, Sissy Salad, Additional Voices
- Mo Collins as Owl Contestant, Feral Ann, Sally Salad, Beautiful Woman
- Maria Bamford as Delooney, Ma Hamshank, B.A.R.F.
- Mindy Sterling as Brainy Jane, Brainy Jane's Brain
- Danny Trejo as Filthy the Foot
- Dylan Saunders as Tooth, Fortune Cookie, Guy (1)
- Patton Oswalt as Jimmy Ron Cricket
- Ashly Burch as Lila Twinklepipes, Sorority Girl #1
- Johnny Ryan as Alexander Hamilton, Brando, School Bus
- Peter Giles as Wagon, Criminal, Zit
- Jessie Francis as Pilow Carpenter
- Sirena Irwin as Shlaverne Difozifini, Statue of Liberty, Banana's Mom & Sisters, Tina Towel
- Bill Fagerbakke as Banana's Dad
- Diedrich Bader as Tony Towel
- David Cross as Thaddeus D. Actwell
- "Weird Al" Yankovic as Mr. Ding-a-Ling
- David Cronenberg as Dr. Cronenbird
- Artt Butler as Orion, Plaintain, Prisoner, Space Technician
- Cosmo Segurson as Louis Cluck
- Robert Englund as Lost Larry, Hockey Mask

== Production ==
Developed as Pig Goat Banana Mantis!, a pilot directed by the independent animator Nick Cross, the stories were described by Ryan as difficult to write, given their intertwined nature and the 11-minute running time. This process was smoothened by the running time being doubled and the direction from the network being clarified. The two had to adjust to the studio environment, and described their career in comics as preparing them for production. Jones, Milo, and Wilson reprise their roles from the original short. Mantis, who had been previously voiced by James Urbaniak, was renamed Cricket and recast with voice actor Paul Rugg.

The animation style tends to go back and forth between hand-drawn animation and flash animation using Toon Boom Harmony software; while the show is primarily animated at Yeson Entertainment Studios in South Korea, some episodes are outsourced to Ánima Estudios in Mexico.

Johnny Ryan and Dave Cooper both claimed the series was influenced by Rick Meyerowitz, Basil Wolverton, Jim Woodring, Dr. Seuss, Tex Avery, Chuck Jones and Max Fleischer.

On June 25, 2015, Nickelodeon renewed Pig Goat Banana Cricket for a second season ahead of the series premiere.

The first episode, "Pig Goat Banana Cricket High Five!", was originally screened at San Diego International Comic-Con on July 11, 2015, along with previews for upcoming episodes of Sanjay and Craig and Harvey Beaks, plus the series premiere of The Loud House.

Ratings for the series were initially favorable. However, ratings began to experience a steep drop mid-season (as an example, the episode "Mall Ya Later" only pulled in 0.79 million viewers) and the last episode aired on Nickelodeon, "It's Time to Slumber Party", was only viewed by 0.95 million viewers.

=== Move to Nicktoons ===
Only the first season of the show aired on Nickelodeon. Following the broadcast of "It's Time to Slumber Party" on February 26, 2016, Nickelodeon removed the series from its schedule due to low ratings and the status of the show remained in limbo for 7 months. It was announced in September 2016 that the second season of the series would be moved to sister network Nicktoons on September 25, 2016. Season 2 episodes premiered on the Nicktoons network sporadically until May 31, 2017. The three remaining episodes were first aired in Poland in 2017; eventually, those episodes aired in the United States one year later on August 11, 2018.

== Broadcast and reception ==
The series premiered in Canada on October 10, 2015, on YTV and on October 18, 2015, on the original channel. In Australia and New Zealand, it premiered on Nickelodeon on October 3, 2016, in Asia, debuted on Nickelodeon on February 23, 2018. In the UK and Ireland, it was broadcast on Nicktoons on January 6, 2018. In Arabia, it aired on Nicktoons at launch. The series is available in India on the Voot streaming service. The series was later added to Paramount+ in 2020, however it was removed in June 2023 for unknown reasons. It is still available for purchases on other services such as Amazon Prime Video.

The pilot, published by Cross and titled Pig Goat Banana Mantis!, was promoted to a Staff Pick on Vimeo.

A writer for Juxtapoz praised the animation, calling it reminiscent for those of "the Ren and Stimpy generation". Andrew Wheeler of ComicsAlliance noted that Ryan's billing as "J. Ryan" was likely to separate him from his controversial reputation in the underground comix scene. Heidi MacDonald of the Comics Beat wrote that it looked "wonderful".
