= Dave Cooper =

Canadian cartoonist (born 1967)

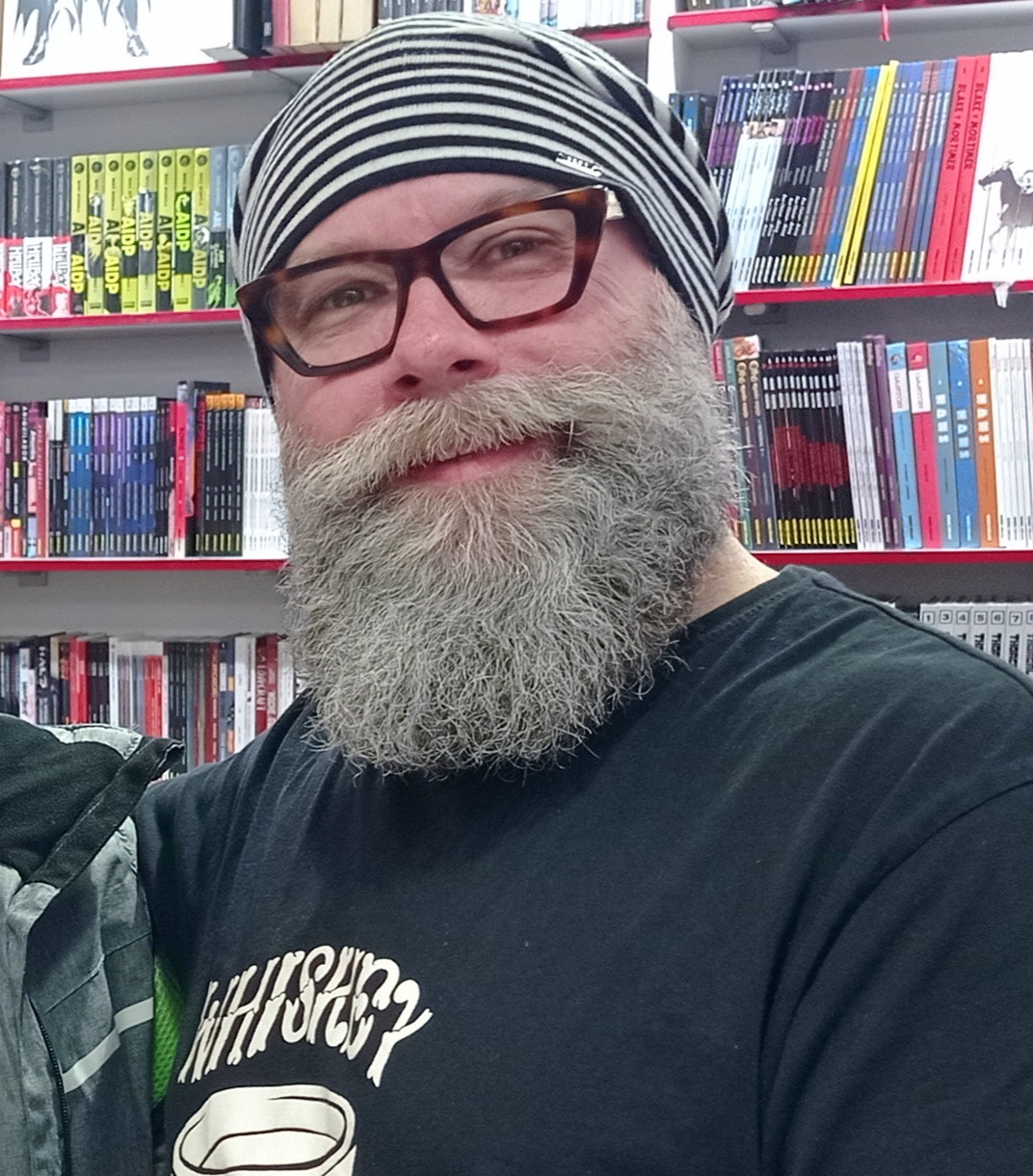
- Born: David Charles Cooper; November 7, 1967 (age 59) Nova Scotia, Canada
- Areas: Cartoonist, painter, animator, producer
- Pseudonym: Hector Mumbly
- Notable works: Suckle, Crumple, Weasel, Pig Goat Banana Cricket, The Bagel and Becky Show
- Awards: Harvey Award (2000); Ignatz Award (2000)

Dave Cooper (born November 7, 1967) is a Canadian cartoonist, oil painter and animator.

== Biography ==
Cooper was born in Nova Scotia on November 7, 1967 and moved to Ottawa, Ontario at the age of nine. He began his career in the 90s, making underground comics for Seattle's Fantagraphics Books. During the production of Batman: The Animated Series, he created numerous pieces of widely-seen promotional art based on Bruce Timm’s designs that are still used on licensed products. His periodical Weasel won both the underground Ignatz Award and the Harvey Award in 2000. His psycho-erotic graphic novel Ripple sported an introduction by David Cronenberg. Years later Cronenberg would be a guest star on Cooper's Pig Goat Banana Cricket.

At the turn of the century, Cooper morphed into an oil painter, showing alternately at galleries in Los Angeles and New York City. He also had a large retrospective of his comicbook artwork in Angouleme and Paris in 2002. Monographs of his paintings included introductions by comedian David Cross, and filmmaker Guillermo del Toro.

Around 2008, Cooper turned his attention to the field of animation, ultimately getting two of his original kids TV shows greenlit — Pig Goat Banana Cricket for Nickelodeon and The Bagel and Becky Show for Teletoon/BBC (based on the book Bagel’s Lucky Hat) despite not being involve the latter show’s production. His short adult film, The Absence of Eddy Table was released in the fall of 2016 and has since won a number of awards internationally.

In the summer of 2017, Cooper returned to oil painting, embarking on ambitious new works for his largest gallery show to date — 70 paintings for Paris 2020. Concurrently, he completed his largest single commission for a Madrid museum—a 13'-wide nod to Bosch's The Garden of Earthly Delights.

In 2019, a French publisher released a 300-page English/French retrospective of Cooper's work, Pillowy, the Art of Dave Cooper. Also in 2019, Cooper joined the board of directors of Ottawa's cutting-edge artist-run centre Saw Gallery.

Cooper lives in Ottawa, Canada.

== Awards ==
- Harvey Award, Best New Series, 2000 — Weasel
- Ignatz Award, Outstanding Artist, 2000 — Weasel

== Selected works ==
- Suckle (1997) ISBN 1-56097-301-3
- Weasel #1–5
- Crumple (2000) ISBN 1-56097-321-8
- Dan and Larry (2002) ISBN 1-56097-433-8
- Ripple (2003) ISBN 1-56097-543-1
- Overbite (Weasel 6) (2003) ISBN 1-56097-550-4
- Underbelly (Weasel 7) (2005) ISBN 1-56097-615-2
- Bagel's Lucky Hat (as Hector Mumbly, 2007) ISBN 0-8118-4875-2
- Bent (2010) ISBN 1-60699-378-X
- Ripple deluxe re-release (2017) ISBN 1-68396-026-2
- Mudbite (2018) ISBN 978-1-68396-087-4
- Dog Head #1 (2024) ISBN 978-2-492646-41-6
