= List of The Backyardigans episodes =

The Backyardigans is a CGI-animated musical TV series created by Janice Burgess. It was written and recorded at Nickelodeon Animation Studio. The series first previewed on the Canadian network Treehouse TV with the episode "Pirate Treasure" on September 11, 2004. Its official debut on Nickelodeon's Nick Jr. block followed on October 11, 2004. The fourth season wrapped production in 2010 and finished airing on Nick Jr. on July 12, 2013.

The series was based upon a live-action pilot called Me and My Friends, which was filmed in 1998 at Nickelodeon Studios Florida. During the course of the series, 80 episodes of The Backyardigans aired over four seasons. The episodes are listed below as ordered in the complete series collection on iTunes, DVD releases, and other digital services.

== Series overview ==
| Season | Episodes | Originally released | |
| Season | Episodes | First released | Last released |
|---|---|---|---|
| Pilots | 2 | Unaired | |
| 1 | 20 | October 11, 2004 | June 19, 2006 |
| 2 | 20 | October 9, 2006 | January 17, 2008 |
| 3 | 20 | January 14, 2008 | June 5, 2009 |
| 4 | 20 | October 26, 2009 | July 12, 2013 |

== Episodes ==
=== Pilots (1998–2002) ===
| Title | Directed by | Written by | Original release date |
|---|---|---|---|
| "Me and My Friends Flag Tag" | Maggie Greenwald | James Still | Unaired |
A live-action pilot with full-body puppets, filmed at Nickelodeon Studios Florida in 1998. In this pilot, Uniqua, Pablo, Tyrone, and Tasha plan on playing "flag tag" with homemade flagpoles made by Uniqua, but Pablo accidentally ruins it by not waiting for the glue on the flags to dry before they play. Pablo learns to wait by doing other things in the meantime. Note: This pilot was produced in September 1998. It was not publicly available until it was posted online on June 27, 2025.
| "Nick Digital pilot" | N/A | Janice Burgess | Unaired |
A computer-animated pilot created at Nick Digital. In this pilot, Uniqua hides in the woods and repeatedly makes a “mysterious sound” to draw Pablo and Tyrone in, who then use sticks to get her out of a pit of quicksand. Note: This pilot was produced in 2002. It was given the working title "Hiking Through the Woods" in an unfinished script leaked on December 25, 2025.

=== Season 1 (2004–2006) ===
| No. overall | No. in season | Title | Directed by | Written by | Storyboard by | Original release date |
|---|---|---|---|---|---|---|
| 1 | 1 | "Pirate Treasure" | Bill Giggie | McPaul Smith | Otis Brayboy | September 11, 2004 (Canada); October 12, 2004 (U.S.) |
Uniqua and Austin are pirates and seek a hidden treasure after discovering half of a treasure map. Unbeknownst to them, Pablo and Tyrone have the other half and are looking for the same treasure. Genre: Reggae and ska Songs: "A Pirate Says Arrr", "Scurvy Pirate" (tune: "Drunken Sailor"), "Treasure", "Falling Off a Log"
| 2 | 2 | "The Heart of the Jungle" | Bill Giggie | Janice Burgess | Lyndon Ruddy | September 12, 2004 (Canada); October 13, 2004 (U.S.) |
Professor Uniqua explores the jungle to deliver Sherman the Worman to his residence. Tarzans Pablo, Tyrone, and Austin attempt to warn her about the jungle's perils, which she is mostly unaware of. Genre: Gilbert and Sullivan Songs: "I'm Tarzan", "Where in the World Do the Wormans Live? (Hey Sherman)", "Into the Thick of It", "It's Drizzling, It's Pouring" (tune: "I'm Called Little Buttercup")
| 3 | 3 | "The Yeti" | Bill Giggie | McPaul Smith | Rob Walton | October 11, 2004 |
Uniqua and Tyrone track Yeti Pablo through the Frozen North. They are accompanied by Tasha, who claims to be a Frozen North expert, and insists that yetis do not exist, until she eventually encounters Pablo near the end. Genre: Rhythm and blues Songs: "Yeti Stomp", "Keep On Snow Going", "Row Your Boat" (tune: "Row, Row, Row Your Boat"), "There's No Such Thing as a Yeti"
| 4 | 4 | "The Snow Fort" | Bill Giggie | Radha Blank | John D. Williamson and Don Spencer | October 19, 2004 |
While Royal Canadian Mounted Police officers Tyrone and Pablo defend the snow fort that guards the world's largest snowball, ski patrol members Tasha and Uniqua mistake them for people who need help. Genre: Western swing Songs: "I'm a Mountie" (tune: "She'll Be Coming 'Round the Mountain"), "Ski Patrol to the Rescue", "Snowball Duty", "Who Could It Be?"
| 5 | 5 | "Secret Mission" | Bill Giggie | McPaul Smith | Lyndon Ruddy | October 14, 2004 |
Secret agents Uniqua, Pablo, and Tyrone sneak into a museum to deliver a mysterious piece of a bone to its rightful owner. They are assisted by a spy gadget, a power rope and a bottle of maple syrup. However, laser beams, booby traps and cages make this mission more difficult than the agents had predicted. Genre: Tango Songs: "Secret Agent", "Sneaking and Hiding", "The Treasures of Ancient Egypt", "Laser Limbo Tango" (tune: "Limbo Rock") Other background music: Every time Uniqua sets up the Power Rope, the four first notes of Fritz Kreisler's Liebesfreud are heard.
| 6 | 6 | "It's Great to Be a Ghost!" | Bill Giggie | Jonny Belt | John D, Williamson and Don Spencer | October 25, 2004 |
In a haunted house, ghosts Uniqua, Pablo, and Tyrone try to scare unsuspecting stranger Tasha who's brave and not scared of the ghosts, until Tyrone scares her near the end. Genre: 1920s jazz Songs: "It's Great to Be a Ghost!", "What's So Scary 'Bout That?", "Hide and Go Boo", "When I'm Booin'" (tune: "When You're Smiling")
| 7 | 7 | "Riding the Range" | Bill Giggie; Michael Shiell | McPaul Smith | John Flagg | October 15, 2004 |
Cowboy Tyrone is on his way to Texas for a hoedown. He has mistakenly taken Uniqua's jumprope. Thinking a bandit stole it, she, Tasha, and Pablo head west. In the end, the trio learn that the bandit was actually Tyrone. Genre: Rap and hip hop Songs: "Riding the Range", "There's an Echo In This Canyon", "Texas, Here I Come", "Buffalo Girls and Boys" (tune: "Buffalo Gals")
| 8 | 8 | "The Key to the Nile" | Bill Giggie; Michael Shiell | Janice Burgess | John Flagg | October 18, 2004 |
Princess CleoTasha (played by Tasha), ruler of Ancient Egypt, and her royal servants Pablo, Tyrone, and Austin seek three presents for the Sphinx Uniqua in order to learn the secret to restoring the Nile river's flow. However, there is just one thing: Princess CleoTasha is bossy and doesn't say please or thank you to her servants after they give her what she wants. Genre: Broadway music Songs: "I Love Being a Princess", "3 Presents for the Sphinx", "I Want My River Back", "Please and Thank You" (tune: "Shine On, Harvest Moon")
| 9 | 9 | "Knights Are Brave and Strong" | Bill Giggie; Michael Shiell | Robert Scull | John Flagg | October 11, 2004 |
Queen Tasha sends Uniqua The Pink to bring a message to King Austin, who shall make her a knight if she succeeds. Along the way, she meets the Moose of the Mist (Tyrone) and Pablo the guardian of the gate, who join her quest in hopes of becoming knights as well. Genre: Big band/swing Songs: "Queens Are Never Wrong", "A Message, A Message" (tune: "A-Tisket, A-Tasket"), "P.U.! (Stinky Swamp Song)", "The Ballad of the Brave Pink Knight (Hey, Uniqua)"
| 10 | 10 | "Viking Voyage" | Bill Giggie; Michael Shiell | Adam Peltzman | John Flagg | November 1, 2004 |
Vikings Uniqua, Pablo, and Tyrone seek to discover uncharted lands. When Mermaid Tasha tries to prevent their ship from moving, they outwit her through song. Genre: Rockabilly Songs: "If You Wanna Be a Viking", "Extra, Extra Tough" (tune: "The Yellow Rose of Texas"), "Hold Tight", "Rockabilly Lullaby (Hush Little Mermaid)"
| 11 | 11 | "Castaways" | Bill Giggie; Michael Shiell | Leslie Valdes | Lyndon Ruddy | August 18, 2005 (Noggin); September 19, 2005 (Nickelodeon) |
Uniqua, Pablo, and Tyrone are castaway on a deserted island. As they struggle to find food and a place to live, they receive mysterious help from Austin, who's too shy to introduce himself. Genre: Bossa nova Songs: "Castaways", "Shy Guy", "Hut by the Sea" (tune: "By the Beautiful Sea"), "Who's There?"
| 12 | 12 | "Race to the Tower of Power" | Bill Giggie; Michael Shiell | Adam Peltzman | Rob Walton | July 18, 2005 |
Supervillains Yucky Man (Pablo) and Dr. Shrinky (Tyrone) plan to steal the Key to the World, which lies in the Tower of Power. Superheroes Weather Woman (Uniqua) and Captain Hammer (Austin) must reach the tower first in order to prevent the theft from occurring. Genre: Salsa Songs: "Superheroes vs. Supervillains", "Key to the World" (tune: "Three Blind Mice"), "The Sea of Gobbly Goo", "You and Me to the Rescue"
| 13 | 13 | "The Quest for the Flying Rock" | Bill Giggie; Michael Shiell | Radha Blank | Lyndon Ruddy | February 21, 2005 |
Uniqua finds a mysterious map that depicts two ways to reach the legendary flying rock on top of Stonestep Hill. She and Tasha decide to journey through the tropical jungle while Pablo and Tyrone cross the hot and dry desert. Genre: Disco Songs: "Flying Rock Song" (tune: "Hail, Hail, the Gang's All Here"), "Questing, Questing", "Shake Your Body", "Trudge, Trudge, Trudge"
| 14 | 14 | "Polka Palace Party" | Bill Giggie; Michael Shiell | McPaul Smith | John Flagg | September 21, 2005 |
Sherman plans to hold a surprise birthday party for his brother Herman at the Cheyenne Polka Palace. Tyrone (on the tuba), Uniqua (on the clarinet), Pablo (on the accordion), and Austin (on the drums) must reach the palace by sundown in order to play at the celebration. Genre: Polka Songs: "Tuba Polka," "Gotta Love the Clarinet", "Feeding Time", "Oh My Sherman" (tune: "Oh My Darling, Clementine"), "Dancin' the Worman Polka"
| 15 | 15 | "Surf's Up" | Bill Giggie; Michael Shiell | Janice Burgess | Rob Walton | April 25, 2005 |
Surfer Pablo hopes to ride the perfect wave at Tiki Beach. Following the instructions of Mysterious Lifeguard Austin, and with the help of fellow surfers Uniqua and Tyrone, he discovers that he must learn a set of "rad moves" before he can find the beach. Genre: Afrobeat Songs: "Cruisin' the Dunes", "Rad Moves", "Mystery Lifeguard" (tune: Guantanamera), "Surf's Up (Ho Daddy)"
| 16 | 16 | "Eureka!" | Bill Giggie; Michael Shiell | Keith Kaczorek | Lyndon Ruddy | September 20, 2005 |
Scientists Uniqua and Tasha search the South Dakota mountains for a Flapasaurus fossil. While searching, they come across prospectors Pablo and Tyrone, who are looking for gold in the same area. Genre: Township Jive Songs: "Digging for Gold", "Those Bones" (tune: "Dem Bones"), "Eureka!", "One Good Turn Deserves Another"
| 17 | 17 | "Race Around the World" | Bill Giggie; Michael Shiell | Rodney Stringfellow | John Flagg | March 10, 2006 |
Austin has never won a race before, but he is well prepared for the very difficult "Race Around the World" competition. He competes with veteran racers Uniqua, Pablo, and Tyrone for his first gold medal. Tasha is the announcer and referee of the race. Genre: Zydeco Songs: "Racing Day", "Go, Go, Go", "Snow Is Cold But I Am Cool", "Austin's Lament Song" (tune: "Twinkle, Twinkle, Little Star")
| 18 | 18 | "Monster Detectives" | Bill Giggie; Michael Shiell | Adam Peltzman | Lyndon Ruddy | October 31, 2005 (Note: This episode was first released on Its Great to Be a Ghost! VHS/DVD on August 30, 2005.) |
Uniqua's soccer ball has been stolen by Pablo, a fearsome but friendly Soccer Monster. Tyrone, a monster detective, helps Uniqua retrieve her ball by infiltrating the Soccer Monster's castle. In the end, Uniqua realizes that Pablo just wants someone else to play soccer with him. Genre: Rock Songs: "I'm a Soccer Monster", "The Rules", "Hide and Seek" (tune: "When the Saints Go Marching In"), "Gotta Get the Job Done"
| 19 | 19 | "Cave Party" | Bill Giggie; Michael Shiell | Anne D. Bernstein | Rob Walton | September 22, 2005 |
Uniqua, Pablo, and Tyrone are the Valley Cave People. The Mountain Cave People, Tasha and Austin, invite them to their cave to howl at the Moon. While waiting for the three Valley Cave People to arrive, the two Mountain Cave People use new inventions to pass the time. Genre: Calypso Songs: "Three Cheers for Ugh!", "Drumming Song", "Skate Ahead", "The Hokey Pokey"
| 20 | 20 | "High Tea" | Bill Giggie; Michael Shiell | Radha Blank | Lyndon Ruddy | June 19, 2006 (Note: This episode was first released on Polka Palace Party VHS/DVD on January 24, 2006.) |
When Uniqua, Pablo, and Tyrone disagree on how to spend the day, they let Tasha decide. She leads them on a quest for the perfect cup of tea that takes them to Borneo, the Ming Empire (ruled by a grumpy Emperor Austin) and the Gobi Desert. Genre: Irish folk music Songs: "Pip Pip Cheerio" (tune: "There'll Be a Hot Time in the Old Town Tonight"), "Zip, Zip, Zip (From Tree to Tree)", "The Grumpy Emperor", "Galloping Song" Background of other music: When the grumpy Emperor Austin denies the tea set, the first ten notes of Enrique Santos Discépolo's Cambalache are heard.

=== Season 2 (2006–2008) ===
Jake Goldberg replaces Zach Tyler Eisen as the voice of Pablo.

Leon G. Thomas III replaces Corwin C. Tuggles as the singing voice of Tyrone.

Jordan Coleman replaces Reginald Davis Jr. as the voice of Tyrone starting with the episode 'Whodunit'

| No. overall | No. in season | Title | Directed by | Written by | Storyboard by | Original release date |
|---|---|---|---|---|---|---|
| 21 | 1 | "Mission to Mars" | Mike Shiell | Robert Scull | Lyndon Ruddy | October 9, 2006 |
Uniqua, Pablo, and Austin are Astronauts. They are sent by ground controllers Tyrone and Tasha to Mars in a Space Shuttle to investigate an odd audio signal. This episode features guest appearances by Alicia Keys as Mommy Martian and Shakyra Lipscomb (Alicia Keys' niece) as Boinga. Genre: Kenyan Highlife Songs: "We're Going to Mars", "Ready for Anything", "Astronauts Never Give Up", "Almost Everything Is Boinga Here" (featuring Alicia Keys and Shakyra Lipscomb)
| 22 | 2 | "Samurai Pie" | Mike Shiell | Adam Peltzman | Lyndon Ruddy | October 16, 2006 |
Samurai pie maker Tyrone must train apprentice Austin to make the Great Pie for Empress Tasha, while fending off a raid from pie-stealing ninjas Uniqua and Pablo (the latter of whom is very clumsy). Genre: Spaghetti Western Songs: "Samurai Pie", "Do You Wanna Make Pies?", "The Great Pie", "Ninjas Like Pie Too" (tune: "Blue Tail Fly")
| 23 | 3 | "Scared of You" | Mike Shiell | Rodney Stringfellow | Dave Pemberton | October 23, 2006 (Note: This episode was first released on Mission to Mars DVD on October 16, 2006.) |
Austin is having his worst birthday ever when his master, Mad Scientist Tasha, orders him to bring three monsters back to her laboratory. The creatures (Werewolf Uniqua, Vampire Pablo, and Mummy Tyrone) end up being invited to a surprise birthday party that awaits Austin when he returns to Tasha. Genre: Jump blues "Songs": "I Got a Secret", "Scared of You", "Hurry Home", "Monster Dance Party"
| 24 | 4 | "Whodunit" | Mike Shiell | Janice Burgess | Lyndon Ruddy | October 17, 2006 |
Pablo the detective explores Mystery Manor's mazes and secret passageways to find out who stole Lady Tasha's jewels. Genre: Gypsy jazz in the style of Django Reinhardt Songs: "Aha!", "Mysterious, Very Mysterious", "The Fleeting Phantom Figure in the Garden", "Whodunit?"
| 25 | 5 | "The Legend of the Volcano Sisters" | Mike Shiell | Radha Blank | Rob Walton | October 18, 2006 |
The Legendary Luau Brothers, Pablo the Swift, Tyrone the Strong, and Austin, must appease the short-tempered and hard to please Volcano Sisters (Uniqua and Tasha) with a special gift to keep them from ruining their luau with a volcanic eruption. Pablo and Tyrone think they are hoping for valuable items, but Austin knows that they really desire invitations to the luau. At the end of the episode, Austin receives the title "Austin the Smart". Genre: Tarantella "Songs": "We Love a Luau", "We'll Get You What You Want", "Huka Pele", "We're Glad"
| 26 | 6 | "The Secret of Snow" | Mike Shiell | Jonny Belt, Robert Scull and Janice Burgess | Dave Pemberton | December 15, 2006 |
Uniqua loves snow and wants to know its secret. A mysterious narrator (Austin) advises her to ask Ice Lady Tasha. However, Ice Lady Tasha is hard to please and thinks Uniqua is only interrupting her work and sends her away to different locations (the desert and the jungle along with Cowboy Pablo and Tyrone of the Jungle). Uniqua sorts the Ice Lady out and learns a valuable lesson about what matters most. Genre: Dixieland Songs: "I Love Snow" (tune: Jingle Bells), "Fill It Up With Ice" (tune: "Good King Wenceslas"), "Make the Ice" (tune: "Deck the Halls"), "The Secret of Snow"
| 27 | 7 | "The Swamp Creature" | Mike Shiell | Koyalee Chanda | Lyndon Ruddy | October 19, 2006 |
In an attempt to gain more customers, swamp tour guides Uniqua and Pablo promise to show short-tempered and bossy tourists Tasha and Austin the seemingly imaginary Swamp Creature. However, the creature turns out to be real, and he's played by Tyrone. Genre: 1960s surf pop Songs: "The Totally Awesome Swamp Adventure", "He's Green", "The Customer Is Always Right", "An Awesomely Bad Time"
| 28 | 8 | "Horsing Around" | Mike Shiell | Chris Nee | Rob Walton | March 19, 2007 (Note: This episode was first released in The Legend of The Volcano Sisters DVD on February 6, 2007.) |
Cowgirl Uniqua and Jockey Pablo are rivals and decide to race each other to see who is the best horse-rider. Austin is the race announcer. They are joined by a rather unusual third racing team: the calm Farmer Tyrone and his slow-moving burro. Genre: Klezmer Songs: "The Horse-Ridin' Cry", "When I Win", "I Betcha I Can", "Keep Goin' Along" (tune: "The Daring Young Man on the Flying Trapeze")
| 29 | 9 | "Special Delivery" | Mike Shiell | Scott Gray | Dave Pemberton | February 14, 2007 |
Uniqua, Pablo, and Tasha are a rough and tough but good biker gang called the "Do-Gooders". Tyrone is a mailman who is very frightened of bikers. While driving along in his mail truck, he gets frightened of the Do-Gooders and drives off. A bag of mail falls out, prompting the Do-Gooders to return it to him. Unfortunately, Tyrone believes that they are chasing him and trying to steal his mail. Genre: Norteño Songs: "We Are the Do-Gooders", "I Never Fail to Deliver the Mail", "Gotta Gas It Up", "Special Delivery" (tune:"La Cucaracha")
| 30 | 10 | "International Super Spy" | Mike Shiell | Robert Scull | Lyndon Ruddy and Rob Walton | September 17, 2007 |
| 31 | 11 | "International Super Spy" | Mike Shiell | Robert Scull | Lyndon Ruddy and Rob Walton | September 17, 2007 |
Pablo is a smooth secret agent who is hired by Miss "T" (Tasha) to protect three containers, said to contain a "recipe for disaster", from the evil Lady in Pink (Uniqua) and her sidekick, Henchman Tyrone. Austin is an undercover agent, who helps Pablo throughout his missions. After Pablo manages to obtain the three secret containers, the Lady in Pink and Henchman Tyrone trick him into handing them over. However, they discover that the canisters simply contain the ingredients needed to make chocolate milk. The song "The Lady in Pink" features an elaborate 007-style music video featuring pop singer Cyndi Lauper as a guest star. Genre: Jazz Songs: "International Super Spy", "The Lady in Pink" (featuring Cyndi Lauper), "Good and Bad Don't Mix", "A Recipe for Disaster", "International Super Spy"
| 32 | 12 | "Movers of Arabia" | Mike Shiell | Scott Gray | Dave Pemberton | March 20, 2007 |
Tyrone, the Sultan of Arabia, has a lot of magical stuff he needs moved from his treasure cave to his palace. He phones Uniqua and Pablo, the Movers of Arabia, to do the job. They are excited, as this is their first job, and upon arriving to the palace, Sultan Tyrone gives them a bottle containing a genie (Austin) who will grant them three wishes in case they are in trouble. Genre: Surf rock Songs: "I Am the Sultan", "Movers of Arabia", "I Wish", "The Genie Bottle" (tune: "Take Me Out to the Ball Game")
| 33 | 13 | "Cops and Robots" | Mike Shiell | Adam Peltzman | Lyndon Ruddy | March 21, 2007 |
Officer Uniqua and Sergeant Tyrone are the space police who must stop evil robots Pablonator (Pablo) and T-900 (Tasha) from breaking into the robot factory and reprogramming the galaxy's robots from "good" to "bad". Genre: Jug band Songs: "Can't Stop the Cops/Bots" (tune: "Shoo Fly, Don't Bother Me!"), "We Are Bad Bots", "Steer, Baby, Steer", "I Feel Good"
| 34 | 14 | "Sinbad Sails Alone" | Mike Shiell | Radha Blank | Rob Walton | February 22, 2008 |
Tyrone is Sinbad, a short-tempereded and lone sailor on a quest to find the end of a rainbow. Pablo is Sinbad's biggest fan who sneaks aboard the ship in order to help him, though Sinbad does not appreciate it. They encounter Siren Uniqua and Medusa (Tasha) during their search for food and water. During the trip, Pablo keeps attempting to help Sinbad with a job, but ends up only causing trouble by accident. However, when they reach a waterfall at the end of the rainbow, and Sinbad gets caught in the sail, Pablo turns out to be a bit helpful after all as he stops the ship using its anchor in time, and Sinbad learns that everyone, even brave sailors like him need help once in a while. Genre: Mambo "Songs": "I'm Sinbad the Sailor", "Siren Says", "Gotta Dodge", "Do It Myself"
| 35 | 15 | "Best Clowns in Town" | Mike Shiell | Adam Peltzman | Rob Walton | September 21, 2007 (Note: This episode was first released of Movers & Shakers on May 29, 2007.) |
Uniqua, Pablo, and Austin are a team of clowns looking for a circus to perform with. Tyrone is the short-tempered and grumpy ringmaster of his own circus, which is heading for Big City. When Tyrone inadvertently misses his train, the clowns make a big deal with him: if they can get Ringmaster Tyrone to his train before it reaches Big City, he must let them join. Even with all sorts of wacky hikings unfolding, they still reach Big City in time for the circus' next show. Genre: Circus music Songs: "Best Clowns in Town", "That's Not Funny" (tune: "Goodnight, Ladies"), "The Show Must Go On", "At the Circus"
| 36 | 16 | "Save the Day" | Mike Shiell | Rodney Stringfellow | Lyndon Ruddy | March 22, 2007 |
Fisher-lady Tasha is determined to catch an oversized trout. She is saved from sharks and other dangerous hazards by diligent Harbor Patrollers Uniqua, Pablo, and Tyrone on separate occasions. Tasha ends up rescuing the patrollers with her fishing pole when their boat starts to sink. Genre: Psychedelic soul "Songs": "Save the Day", "I'll Catch a Whopper" (tune: "Pop Goes the Weasel"), "Nothing Too Tough", "Uh-Oh!"
| 37 | 17 | "Into the Deep" | Mike Shiell | Adam Peltzman | Lyndon Ruddy | June 27, 2007 |
Pablo and Tyrone are deep-sea explorers who plan to videotape a mermaid. They find two mermaids (Uniqua and Tasha), who mishear the deep-sea explorers talking and believe that they will be captured. The mermaids do everything they can to get rid of them until realizing that Pablo and Tyrone want to capture them on film, rather than in cages. Genre: Bollywood Songs: "Into the Deep", "Call of the Mermaid", "Our Garden", "You've Got to Be Brave"
| 38 | 18 | "News Flash" | Mike Shiell | Janice Burgess | Dave Pemberton | January 18, 2008 (Note: This episode was first released on Into the Deep DVD on July 31, 2007.) |
Pablo and Tyrone are farmers who want their prized corn crop to be present on the news. The local station, W-I-O-Wa, does not consider their corn "real news" and denies their request to be featured. Desperate to see their corn on television anyway, the mischievous farmers trick the news team (Uniqua, Tasha, and Austin) into thinking that a real alien spaceship will land in their corn field. Genre: Motown Songs: "W-I-O-Wa", "Corn", "News Flash", "It's All News to Us"
| 39 | 19 | "Catch That Butterfly" | Mike Shiell | Koyalee Chanda | Lyndon Ruddy | January 16, 2008 |
Professor Pablo, a famed English insect expert, is hunting the gilded golden butterfly. He chases it to the West, where he hires stagecoach drivers Uniqua and Tyrone to help him catch it. Genre: Comic opera Songs: "The Gilded Golden Butterfly", "We're Tough", "How Hard Can It Be?", "The Butterfly Hunt" (tune: "The Barber of Seville")
| 40 | 20 | "A Giant Problem" | Mike Shiell | Adam Peltzman | Rob Walton | January 17, 2008 (Note: This episode was first released on Super Secret Super Spy DVD on September 18, 2007.) |
Short-tempered and grumpy Queen Uniqua really wants to take a nap, but she finds herself unable to do so with Giant Tasha on the loose. She hires clumsy wizards Pablo and Tyrone to get rid of Tasha. Genre: 1980s pop Songs: "Nobody's Bigger Than a Giant", "It's Hard to Be a Wizard", "I Know a Spell", "On Top of the World"

=== Season 3 (2008–2009) ===
Gianna Bruzzese replaces Naelee Rae as the voice of Tasha.

Gabriella Malek replaces Kristin Klabunde as the singing voice of Tasha starting with the episode 'Chichen-Itza Pizza'.

Damani Roberts briefly replaces Leon G. Thomas III as the singing voice of Tyrone for three episodes starting with the aforementioned episode.

Tyrel Jackson Williams eventually replaces Damani Roberts as the singing voice of the character for the remainder of the series, starting with the special 'Tale of the Mighty Knights'.

| No. overall | No. in season | Title | Directed by | Written by | Original release date |
|---|---|---|---|---|---|
| 41 | 1 | "Who Goes There?" | Dave Palmer | Chris Nee | April 4, 2008 |
Tyrone is a night watchman at a museum where the exhibits (Lady Uniqua, a character from an Impressionist painting; General Pablo, a statue; and Austocles (Austin), a figure on a Greek urn) come to life at night. When Tyrone discovers them, he chases the art through the building and inadvertently makes a mess of the museum. The exhibits manage to help him clean it up before Curator Tasha arrives. Genre: Flamenco Songs: "Who Goes There?", "Tired of Hanging Around", "The Art is on the Loose", "The Splatter Paint Flamenco"
| 42 | 2 | "Blazing Paddles" | Dave Palmer | Rodney Stringfellow | April 11, 2008 (Note: This episode was first released on Tales of the Mighty Knights on February 26, 2008.) |
Uniqua is the sheriff of Ping Pong Mesa, a small western town. Tyrone is the town saloon barkeeper, Tasha is the bar-room Can-can dancer, and Austin is the deputy. When the evil Ping Pong Bandit (Pablo) arrives and beats each resident in a game of ping pong, he steals their paddles. When the town residents get Uniqua, even she cannot beat him. Pablo steals her paddle, too, and he even names himself the new sheriff of the town. However, Uniqua decides to practice her ping pong skills in the desert and returns to the town in disguise as the Pink Fury to beat Pablo. Genre: Raï Songs: "The Sheriff Makes It Right", "Ping Pong", "I Must Be Ready", "No One Gets to Play Today"
| 43 | 3 | "Garbage Trek" | Dave Palmer | Robert Scull | January 15, 2009 |
In this homage to Star Trek, Lieutenant Uniqua, Captain Tasha, and Ensign Austin of the U.S.S. Collector roam the galaxy collecting space garbage. The evil Moose-ians, Pablo and Tyrone, try to steal the garbage away by tricking them with fake distress calls. Genre: Jazz-funk Songs: "Garbage Trek", "Trash Day", "That Garbage Funk", "You Can Do It"
| 44 | 4 | "Fly Girl" | Dave Palmer | Chris Nee | February 1, 2008 |
Uniqua is a pilot who delivers singing telegrams to three grumpy residents: a pirate played by Pablo, a maharani played by Tasha, and Tyrone the abominable snowman. She attempts to cheer them up, but wrongly believes that her arrival has done nothing but anger them. The grumpy telegram recipients visit Uniqua's airport and reveal that she made them happy. Genre: 1950s rock and roll in the style of Elvis Presley Songs: "Singing Telegram", "Clean, Clean", "A Grump Like You", "Thank You"
| 45 | 5 | "What's Bugging You?" | Dave Palmer | Adam Peltzman | May 12, 2008 |
Uniqua and Tyrone are pest controllers who deal with wild creatures by talking to them instead of exterminating them. Lady Tasha hires them to rid her house of Wormans before Mr. Spiffy (Pablo) arrives to inspect her dwelling. Unfortunately, everything Uniqua and Tyrone do just attracts more Wormans. Genre: Rhumba Songs: "What's Bugging You?", "My Name Is Spiffy", "Get Those Little Critters", "The Worman Party"
| 46 | 6 | "Chichen-Itza Pizza" | Dave Palmer | Robert Scull | June 6, 2008 (Note: This episode was first released on High Flying Adventures! DVD on May 13, 2008.) |
Uniqua and Tasha own a pizzeria in Chichen-Itza in ancient Mexico. After receiving an order from Mayan King Tyrone, they must cross the Mexican jungle to bring a pizza to his pyramid. Genre: College rock Songs: "Chichen-Itza Pizza", "A Bicycle Built for Two" (tune: "Daisy Bell"), "I Quit!", "Yum!"
| 47 | 7 | "To the Center of the Earth" | Dave Palmer | Billy Aronson | March 7, 2008 |
Tyrone has dropped his lucky penny into a hole. Victorian-era inventors Uniqua and Pablo decide that it must have fallen to the center of the earth and use their rocket-drill to find it. Whenever they stop somewhere, they spot the penny and Tyrone tries to get it by himself, but the inventors stop him. They use one of their inventions to get it, but the inventions end up losing it by accident. At the center of the earth, it's up to the three to get the penny from a dinosaur. Genre: 1930s small novelty band Songs: "Amazing Inventors", "To the Center of the Earth", "The Diamond Slide", "The Extendo-Arm"
| 48 | 8 | "Front Page News" | Dave Palmer | Scott Gray | June 27, 2008 |
Tasha is the photographer for Bigopolis Big News. A giant robot is inadvertently causing trouble in the city and her grumpy boss, Pablo the editor, asks her to get a picture of him and resident superheroes Bug Girl (Uniqua) and Captain Bubble (Tyrone). However, Tasha becomes so preoccupied with helping the heroes that she forgets to take a photograph. Genre: Berlin Cabaret Songs: "I've Got a Secret Identity", "Front Page News", "Bug Girl", "Cheese, Cheese"
| 49 | 9 | "Tale of the Mighty Knights" | Dave Palmer | Adam Peltzman | January 14, 2008 |
| 50 | 10 | "Tale of the Mighty Knights" | Dave Palmer | Adam Peltzman | January 14, 2008 |
Knights Uniqua and Tyrone are appointed to guard King Pablo’s egg. They chase it through the woods and meet the Grabbing Goblin (Austin), who attempts to steal the egg and add it to his collection of junk. Knight Uniqua, Sir Tyrone, and the Grabbing Goblin encounter the Flighty Fairy (Tasha) after losing King Pablo's egg. The egg, which has sprouted wings, leads them to the dreaded Dragon Mountain. This episode uses an alternate opening in the style of 1970s rock. The final song features vocals by Adam Pascal. Genre: Rock opera Songs: "We're Knights, "A Challenge", "Goblin", "Tweedily-Dee", "Dragon Mountain", "Not An Egg Anymore" (featuring Adam Pascal)
| 51 | 11 | "Le Master of Disguise" | Dave Palmer | Janice Burgess | April 18, 2008 |
Inspector Austin of the Paris police is chasing down Le Master of Disguise (Pablo), whom he has cornered on the Orient Express bound for Istanbul. Because Le Master of Disguise always changes his appearance, Austin must interrogate each of the passengers to find out which one is the criminal he is looking for. Genre: Jùjú Songs: "Le Master of Disguise", "Who Can It Be?", "I'm a Cowboy", "Could Le Master of Disguise Do This?"
| 52 | 12 | "Match on Mt. Olympus" | Dave Palmer | Robert Scull | August 4, 2008 (Note: This episode was first released on Mighty Match-Up! DVD on July 8, 2008.) |
Pablo and Tyrone (the weatherman and sportscaster on an Ancient Greek news station) forecast sunny weather that is perfect for playing basketball. They are just about to start playing when it starts to rain. They decide to climb Mount Olympus to ask Tasha, the evil Goddess of Weather, for sunshine. Along the way, they meet and befriend the Goddess of Naps (Uniqua) and the God of Laughter (Austin). They challenge Tasha to a game of basketball that will determine whether or not it will continue raining. Genre: Samba Songs: "It's a Sunny Day", "The Gods of Mount Olympus" (tune: "Big Rock Candy Mountain"), "Basketball", "I'm Busy"
| 53 | 13 | "The Great Dolphin Race" | Dave Palmer | Rodney Stringfellow | July 11, 2008 |
Under the sea in Atlantis, Uniqua and Pablo run a dolphin stable for their rude and short-tempered employer and resident dolphin racer, Tyrone. One day, Uniqua rescues an incredibly fast dolphin from a giant clam. She keeps the dolphin and trains him as a racer, but Tyrone says that the dolphin is too small to race. Uniqua then challenges Tyrone to a race. If she wins, she gets to keep Sea Squirt in Tyrone's stable. If Tyrone wins, she and Sea Squirt must leave forever. Genre: Cumbia Songs: "We Love Dolphins", "Someday", "I'll Be With You All the Way" (tune: "Home on the Range"), "The Greatest Dolphin Race"
| 54 | 14 | "Caveman's Best Friend" | Dave Palmer | Adam Peltzman | January 13, 2009 |
Austin the caveman wants a pet, so he visits Uniqua's pet store and gets a dinosaur puppy named Boy. Uniqua warns him that Boy should always have his leash on, but Austin is too far away to hear her. He removes the leash and Boy runs off, leading Uniqua and Austin on a chase throughout their prehistoric village. Genre: Early soul Songs: "I Want a Pet", "I Need a Hand", "Where Has My Dinosaur Gone" (tune: "Where, Oh Where Has My Little Dog Gone?"), "Now Would Be a Good Time to Whistle"
| 55 | 15 | "Ranch Hands from Outer Space" | Dave Palmer | Rodney Stringfellow | January 12, 2009 |
Overworked rancher Tasha wants to hire some ranch hands to help her out. Aliens Zuniqua (Uniqua) and Zablo (Pablo) have landed their ship just outside her farm. They have run out of pancakes to fuel their ship and must assist Tasha in order to receive a plate of pancakes as a reward. Genre: 1960s Italian pop Songs: "I Gotta Get to Work", "We'll Work for Pancakes", "Zoid-Zoid!", "Oh, My!"
| 56 | 16 | "Robin Hood the Clean" | Dave Palmer | Scott Gray | February 27, 2009 (Note: This episode was first released on Robin Hood the Clean DVD on February 10, 2009.) |
Uniqua, Tyrone, and Tasha live in the perpetually dirty town of Filthingham. They wish to be clean, but evil Mayor Austin Stinkypants has forbidden cleanliness and locked all of their cosmetic products away. Deciding that enough is enough, Tyrone start to sneaking from the town and enlists the help of Robin Hood the Clean (Pablo) to stop Stinkypants. Genre: Countrypolitan Songs: "Everything is Filthy in Filthingham", "We Wish We Could Wash", "Robin Hood the Clean", "The Festival of Soap"
| 57 | 17 | "Escape from Fairytale Village" | Dave Palmer | Billy Aronson | June 5, 2009 (Note: This episode was first released on Escape from Fairytale Village! DVD on October 7, 2008.) |
Tyrone the paperboy has a new route through the forest in Fairytale Village. He meets Uniqua the witch (from "Hansel and Gretel" tale), Pablo the giant (from "Jack and the Beanstalk" tale), and Austin the wolf (from "The Three Little Pigs" tale). Genre: Bluegrass in the style of Jerry Reed Songs: "Newspaper, Newspaper!", "You're in Fairytale Village", "Gotta Dash", "Why Does Everyone Want to Eat Me?"
| 58 | 18 | "Pirate Camp" | Dave Palmer | Kerri Grant | June 9, 2008 |
Uniqua and a visibly nervous Pablo attend Captain Austin's pirate camp. Aboard his ship, Captain Austin instructs the campers in the fundamentals of pirating. They learn to heave-ho, swashbuckle, and scallawag. When Austin accidentally steps into the boot of the ghost Captain Redboots (Tasha), he is transported to Redboots' cave and needs his campers to save him. Genre: Garage rock Songs: "Pirate Camp", "Ya Gotta Have Pirattitude", "The Scalawag", "Redboots"
| 59 | 19 | "The Two Musketeers" | Dave Palmer | Robert Scull | January 14, 2009 |
Pablo and Tyrone are the Two Musketeers. They fight against the Empress, whose guards (Uniqua and Austin) pursue them. A masked lady (Tasha) hopes to become the third musketeer, but Tyrone and Pablo refuse to let her join. Later, the Musketeers are locked by the guards and thrown into the palace prison, where Tasha is the only person who can break them out. Genre: Son cubano Songs: "It's Great to Be a Musketeer", "Number Three", "We Don't Care For the Empress", "In the Name of the Empress"
| 60 | 20 | "The Masked Retriever" | Dave Palmer | Janice Burgess | September 16, 2010 |
Uniqua loves her job as a librarian in Viejo, California. When the evil Don Austin refuses to return a book, she becomes the Masked Retriever and tracks him down. Genre: Jazz in the style of Herb Alpert & the Tijuana Brass Songs: "The Masked Retriever", "I Love the Library", "I'm Going to Get That Book Back", "A Happy Ending"

=== Season 4 (2009–2013) ===
Chris Grant Jr. replaces Jordan Coleman as the voice of Tyrone.

Avion Baker replaces Jamia Simone Nash as the singing voice of Uniqua.

Nicholas Barasch replaces Thomas Sharkey as the singing voice of Austin.

| No. overall | No. in season | Title | Directed by | Written by | Original release date |
|---|---|---|---|---|---|
| 61 | 1 | "Robot Rampage" | Dave Palmer | Janice Burgess | May 21, 2010 (Note: This episode was first released on Robot Repairman DVD on October 13, 2009.) |
| 62 | 2 | "Robot Rampage" | Dave Palmer | Janice Burgess | May 21, 2010 |
Austin and Robot Roscoe run a repair shop in the futuristic Mega City, where robots perform daily tasks and never break down. When the robots belonging to Uniqua, Tyrone, and Tasha malfunction, Austin and Roscoe must find out what is causing the problem. Evil Professor Bug (Pablo) is revealed to be making all of the robots in Mega City malfunction so that he can take over. It's up to Austin, his repair skills, and the help of his friends to defeat the steampunk professor and fix the robots. Genre: Roller disco Songs: "Robots Never Ever Break", "Robot on a Rampage", "Professor Bug", "Screw Loose", "I Get Whatever I Want", "Like a Robot", "Give Me the Remote"
| 63 | 3 | "Catch That Train!" | Dave Palmer | Rodney Stringfellow | October 2, 2009 |
Uniqua is a train engineer in Moscow, Russia. Tsar Tyrone and his assistant Pablo Pablovich are heading to the Winter Palace. However, Pablo releases the train's external brake while Tyrone is napping on the train by accident. Uniqua and Pablo must chase the train across Russia using a handcar, a horse-drawn sleigh, and skis. Genre: Ragtime Songs: "Yes Sir, I Am the Engineer", "We've Got to Catch That Train!", "Don't Sleepwalk on the Train", "It Was a Really Good Choo-Choo Ride"
| 64 | 4 | "Attack of the 50 Foot Worman" | Dave Palmer | Scott Gray | November 27, 2011 |
Sherman the Worman becomes a giant after covering himself in Scientist Pablo's experimental growth formula by accident. Pablo and his assistant Uniqua must find a solution to shrink Sherman back to his original size. Genre: 1950s jazz Songs: "I'm a Scientist", "Mix It Up", "Where'd It Go?", "That Worman Must Shrink"
| 65 | 5 | "Dragon Express" | Dave Palmer | Rodney Stringfellow | January 15, 2012 (Note: This episode was first released on Join the Adventurers' Club DVD on January 5, 2010.) |
It is Pablo's first day as an employee at the Dragon Express delivery service. He meets Air Boss Uniqua and fellow driver Austin in the mountains of Norway. As they make deliveries to Cliff Top Castle and the Mountain Mine, Pablo teaches Austin the art of "fancy flying." When Pablo gets into trouble delivering a package to the Ice Palace, Austin must use his newly learned flying skills to help his friend. Genre: Strauss waltz Songs: "Dragon Express", "Fancy Flying", "Dragon Jock", "Woo Hoo"
| 66 | 6 | "Flower Power" | Dave Palmer | Scott Gray | November 27, 2009 |
Flower seller Uniqua is pricked by the thorn of an unusual flower and gains the power to make flowers of any size. Gardener Pablo dubs her Flower Girl, and she defends Garden City from the evil Gloom Meister (Austin). Genre: Rebetiko Songs: "Things Are Always Rosy", "Superhero Practice", "Me and My Shadows", "This Is My Song"
| 67 | 7 | "The Funnyman Boogeyman" | Dave Palmer | Rodney Stringfellow | October 26, 2009 |
The Boo Crew (Uniqua and Pablo) are searching for monsters. They find the Boogeyman (Austin) in an abandoned theater, but he turns out to be a comedian looking for an audience. Genre: Martinique Biguine Songs: "The Boo Crew", "Find Me", "Catch That Boogeyman", "Giant Shoes"
| 68 | 8 | "Follow the Feather" | Dave Palmer | Jeff Borkin | July 8, 2013 |
After finding the feather of a flying polka-dotted pony, Adventurer Tyrone brings Pablo and Tasha on a quest to find the mysterious being. As they travel to Tibet, they receive help from Uniqua, who tells them that they must follow the inscriptions on the feather to locate the pegasus. Genre: Psychedelic rock Songs: "Watch Her Fly", "Follow the Feather", "Things Could Always Be Worse", "She Won't Fly"
| 69 | 9 | "Break Out!" | Dave Palmer | Carin Greenberg | November 5, 2010 (Note: This episode was first released on Escape From the Tower DVD on March 30, 2010.) |
Sister princesses Uniqua and Tasha have been locked in a castle tower for many years. They plan to break out with the help of their magic mirror (Austin). However, evil guards Pablo and Tyrone discover their scheme and try to stop them from escaping the castle tower. Genre: Wall of Sound Songs: "Break Out!", "You Can't Get Out of Here", "Dance For Your Life", "The Chase Is On"
| 70 | 10 | "The Action Elves Save Christmas Eve" | Dave Palmer | Adam Peltzman | December 7, 2009 |
Snappy (Uniqua), Mr. Jingles (Pablo), and Flappy (Tasha) are a group of helpful elves who assist Santa Claus. They must retrieve Santa's sack when the Abominable Brothers (Tyrone and Austin) steal it on Christmas Eve. Genre: Memphis soul Songs: "Action Elves", "Magic Sack", "Snowball Fight", "To Fill the Sack for Santa" (tune: "The Twelve Days of Christmas")
| 71 | 11 | "Los Galacticos" | Dave Palmer | Adam Peltzman | July 9, 2013 |
Pablo, Tyrone, and Tasha are the world-famous Mariachi band Los Galacticos. After receiving a new tour bus, they quickly learn that it is actually a spaceship. They launch themselves into space by accident and learn that they must defend the Earth from a duo of evil Googor aliens (Uniqua and Austin), who plan to cover the planet in goo. Genre: Mariachi and Banda Songs: "Los Galacticos", "We Love Goo", "Pushing Every Button", "Earth Es Muy Bueno"
| 72 | 12 | "For the Love of Socks!" | Dave Palmer | Kerri Grant | November 27, 2011 |
Uniqua, Pablo, and Tyrone work in the world's sock factory under the watchful eye of Foreman Tasha. When Tasha loses her pencil in the machine, causing it to break down, they must enter its cavernous depths to fix the contraption. Genre: Bhangra Songs: "Socks, Wonderful Socks", "That's My Job, That's My Job", "A Life Without Socks Is Not a Life For Me", "Gotta Get the Pencil"
| 73 | 13 | "The Flipper!" | Dave Palmer | Scott Gray | November 11, 2012 (Nick Jr. Channel) (Note: This episode was first released on Operation Elephant Drop DVD on July 13, 2010.); April 25, 2013 (Nickelodeon) |
Uniqua, Pablo, and Tasha are the Meteor Watch Squad. They scan the sky for meteors and learn that one is heading for the Earth. Pablo, who has created an untested anti-meteor device, gets coated with a vial of space goo and transforms into a giant Hulk-like creature whenever he gets overexcited about the meteor. Uniqua and Tasha must calm him down so that he can use his machine to stop the meteor from reaching the atmosphere. Genre: Rock and roll in the style of Bo Diddley Songs: "Today Could Be the Day" (tune: Bo Diddley), "Where Is Meteor?", "Don't Flip Out" (tune: I Want Candy), "The Meteor Watchers' Celebration"
| 74 | 14 | "Elephant on the Run" | Dave Palmer | Jeff Borkin | April 22, 2010 |
Delivery agents Pablo and Tyrone are bringing an Indian elephant to the Dandeli Wildlife Sanctuary for Park Ranger Tasha. When Miss Rhamaswami (Uniqua) and her assistant Austin-Ji steal the elephant in hopes of keeping her as a pet, the agents must take the elephant back before Tasha notices. Genre: Alternative rock Songs: "We Are Delivery Agents", "Havin' an Elephant for a Pet", "Elephant, Where Could You Be?", "Right Where She Belongs"
| 75 | 15 | "The Magic Skateboard" | Dave Palmer | Rodney Stringfellow | July 10, 2013 |
Uniqua, Pablo, Tyrone, and Austin are taking part in a skateboarding competition. Tyrone is new to the sport and is unsure of his abilities. After his skateboard breaks, he finds a magic skateboard in a cave and begins boarding better than he ever has. He wants to use it in the competition, but learns that his skills matter more than winning. Genre: Forró Songs: "The Showoff Showdown", "Get a Little Better", "I Found the Magic Skateboard", "May the Best Dude Win"
| 76 | 16 | "Pablor and the Acorns" | Dave Palmer | Ellen Martin | July 12, 2013 (Note: This episode was first released on Christmas With the Backyardigans DVD on October 5, 2010.) |
Tyrone, Tasha, and Austin are Acorn Scouts who plan to climb Buttercup Mountain to earn their mountain-climbing merit badges. Meanwhile, space supervillains Uniquor (Uniqua) and Pablor (Pablo) battle for a powerful crystal. Pablor crash-lands on planet Earth and notices the crystal on top of the mountain. The Acorns offer to lead the brusque and rude Pablor to the top of the mountain and teach him what they have learned as Acorns. Genre: Society band Songs: "Acorns", "The Crystal of Power", "Hold My Hand", "I'd Rather Be an Acorn"
| 77 | 17 | "Super Team Awesome!" | Dave Palmer | Jeff Borkin | July 11, 2013 |
Tyrone is the tour guide for Old Gushie Cavern. A boulder breaks loose and threatens to plug the cavern's geyser, which will cause the Earth to explode. Tyrone calls for help and is assisted by Princess Strong Blossom (Uniqua), Pirate Pablo, and Jungle Girl (Tasha). Genre: Country rock Songs: "I'm a Tour Guide", "I'm a Superhero", "Super Heroes For Goodness Sake", "Super Team Awesome!"
| 78 | 18 | "The Big Dipper Diner" | Dave Palmer | Rodney Stringfellow | February 25, 2011 |
Uniqua and Pablo work at the Big Dipper Diner. Their best customers, space officers Tyrone and Tasha, are hunting down a dangerous alien criminal known as the Blarg. Unfortunately, Blarg is identical to Hugs, one of the diner's friendliest regulars. Genre: Folk rock Songs: "The Big Dipper Diner", "Two Eggs Moony-Side Up", "Something Suspicious Going On", "Stop That Alien!"
| 79 | 19 | "The Amazing Splashinis" | Dave Palmer | Janice Burgess | May 28, 2010 |
Uniqua, Pablo, and Tyrone are the world's greatest synchronized diving team, the Amazing Splashinis. They want to perform their most daring trick, the Sextuple Somersault Splash, but a playful sea monster has taken over their pool. Genre: Balalaika orchestra Songs: "The High Dive", "The Sextuple Somersault Splash", "Let's Go", "You'd Make a Great Splashini"
| 80 | 20 | "The Tale of the Not-So-Nice Dragon" | Dave Palmer | Adam Peltzman | December 16, 2012 (Note: This episode was first released in We Arrr Pirates! DVD on March 8, 2011.) |
In a sequel to the "Tale of the Mighty Knights" episodes, Tasha the Flighty Fairy and Austin the Grabbing Goblin are invited to a tea party at King Pablo's castle. When a monstrous red dragon attacks the kingdom and takes the members of King Pablo's court hostage, Tasha and Austin must save them with the help of Dragon. Genre: 1930s Broadway Songs: "A Wonderful Day for Tea", "We're Not Knights", "We're Stuck in a Cave", "Mini-Muffins" Note: This episode is the series finale.
