= David Abbott (advertising) =

British advertising executive (1938–2014)

- Abbott in 1988.
- Born: 11 October 1938; London, United Kingdom
- Died: 17 May 2014 (aged 75); London
- Resting place: Highgate Cemetery
- Education: Merton College, Oxford
- Occupations: Advertising executive, copywriter, creative director, author

David John Abbott (11 October 1938 – 17 May 2014) was a British advertising executive who founded Abbott Mead Vickers BBDO. He was one of the most celebrated advertising executives in the world, and regarded as the greatest copywriter of his generation. Highlights of his career include the creation of the J.R. Hartley television commercial for Yellow Pages as well as work for Volkswagen, Volvo, The Economist, the RSPCA, Sainsbury's Supermarkets and Chivas Regal.

== Career history ==
Born in Hammersmith, West London, David Abbott won a scholarship to read History at Merton College, Oxford but left before graduating to nurse his father who was ill with cancer and who later died. Abbott began as a copywriter working in-house at Kodak after discovering a book at a market stall about advertising on Madison Avenue. In 1963 he started work at the Mather & Crowther agency before moving to the Manhattan-based Doyle Dane Bernbach in 1965.

At Doyle Dane Bernbach, Abbott was taken under the wing of Bill Bernbach, the visionary creative director of DDB. In 1971 he returned to the UK and founded French Gold Abbott with Richard French and Mike Gold. Abbott co-founded Abbott Mead Vickers alongside Adrian Vickers and Peter Mead in 1977, having first met Vickers at Oxford University in 1959. The agency's clients included Volvo, Sainsbury's, IKEA, Chivas Regal, The Economist, Yellow Pages, and the RSPCA. In 1991, BBDO acquired a stake in AMV and the agency's name became Abbott Mead Vickers BBDO.

Abbott retired from advertising in October 1998 at the age of 60 to concentrate on writing his first novel.

== Awards and accolades ==
David Abbott was D&AD President in 1975 and President's Award Winner in 1986.

The One Club for Art and Copy inducted Abbott into its Creative Hall of Fame in 2001 three years after he retired. Abbott was the second Briton, after David Ogilvy, to be inducted into the hall of fame.

== FCUK controversy ==
In 2000 David Abbott wrote an open letter to Campaign Magazine in response to the publication awarding FCUK their advertiser of the year accolade. The letter to the publication read:

Fcuk me, what a brilliant choice for advertiser of the year. Fcuking great idea to put fcuking four-letter words on fcuking big posters, where every fcuking eight-year-old can see them. What a fcuking cool way to get up the noses of those fcuking parents and teacher tossers who are trying to bring their kids up as fcuking goody-goodies. That’s the way to sell a youth brand, though haven’t I seen it fcuking before on the lav walls? Anyhow, great to see the industry magazine behaving in such a fcuking great way - makes me fcuking nostalgic, it does.

In response to this letter Trevor Beattie, the man behind the campaign, hit back at Abbott during the Cannes Lions International Festival of Creativity accusing him of boring the pants off the audience with a lengthy diatribe.

== Published works ==
Together with Alfredo Marcantonio and John O'Driscoll, David Abbott authored a book about the history of Volkswagen advertising entitled 'Remember those great Volkswagen ads?', a comprehensive account of the most influential campaign in the history of advertising. His first novel, The Upright Piano Player, was published in 2010 by MacLehose Press. John Burnham Schwartz, the author of Bicycle Days and Reservation Road, called Abbott's debut novel 'a wise and moving debut, an accomplished novel of quiet depths and resonant shadows.'

== Personal life ==
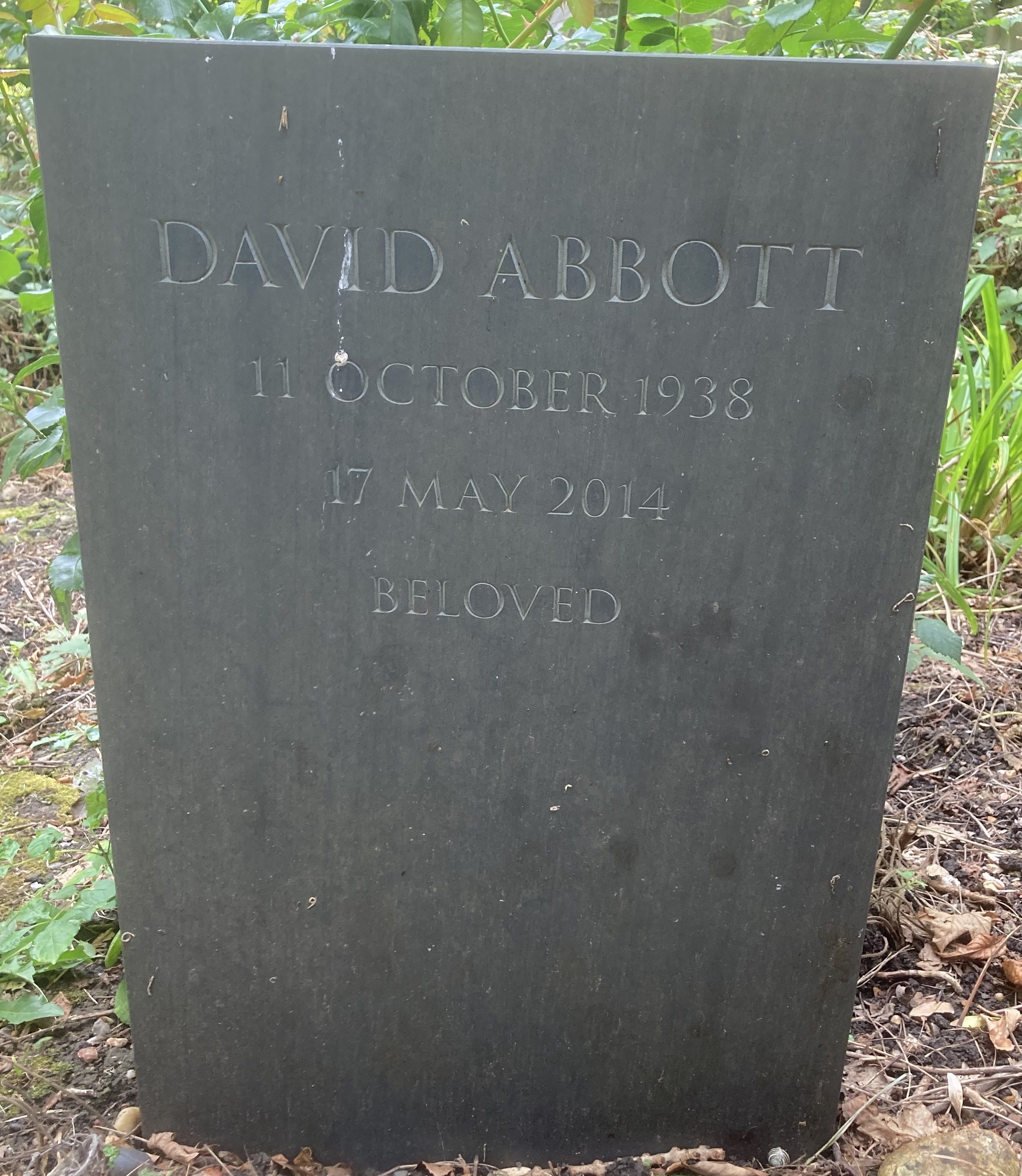
Grave of David Abbott in Highgate Cemetery

Abbott was married and had four children and eight grandchildren.

== Death ==
David Abbott died at the age of 75 after undergoing heart surgery at London's Royal Brompton Hospital. He was buried on the eastern side of Highgate Cemetery.
