= Pablo the Penguin =

Pablo the Penguin may refer to:

- A character from the Disney film The Three Caballeros
- A character from the Nickelodeon TV show The Backyardigans
