= Sean Curley =

American actor (born 1995)

- Born: July 14, 1995 (age 31); United States
- Occupation: Actor

Sean Curley (born July 14, 1995) is a Mexican American actor. He is known as the singing voice of Pablo on the children's TV series The Backyardigans. He also played Josh Learner in Reservation Road.

== Early life ==
Sean Curley was born in the United States on July 14, 1995.

== Career ==
He starred as Chip in the Broadway musical Beauty and the Beast before starring as a boy in Fiddler on the Roof. In 2004, he landed on two voice roles in children's television — Spencer Piggle in Whoopi's Littleburg and as the singing voice of Pablo on The Backyardigans, both of which aired on the Nick Jr. programming block. In 2007, he starred as Josh Learner in Reservation Road, which was based on the book by John Burnham Schwartz. In 2009, he starred as a twelve-year-old Lyn in The Men Who Stare at Goats, which was based on the book by Jon Ronson.

== Credits ==
=== Film ===
Year	Title	Role
2007	Reservation Road	Josh
2009	The Men Who Stare at Goats	Lyn (12 years old)

=== Television ===
Year	Title	Role	Note
2004	Whoopi's Littleburg	Spencer Piggle	Main role (3 episodes)
2004-2010	The Backyardigans	Pablo (singing voice)	Recurring (79 episodes)

=== Stage ===
Year	Title	Role	Note
	Beauty and the Beast	Chip	Broadway Debut
February 26, 2004 – January 8, 2006	Fiddler on the Roof	Boy	Broadway
