= Castaways (song) =

2005 single by The Backyardigans

Song by The Backyardigans

from the album The Backyardigans
- Released: July 12, 2005
- Genre: Bossa nova
- Length: 1:28
- Label: Nick
- Composer: Douglas Joel Wieselman
- Lyricists: Leslie Valdes; McPaul Smith
- Producers: Evan Lurie; Douglas Wieselman

"Castaways" is a song that aired in the animated children's television series The Backyardigans. It went viral on TikTok in 2021.

== History ==
The song was originally released in 2005, on the first season of The Backyardigans. It aired on the show's 11th episode of the same name. It was later released in the album The Backyardigans along with other songs from the show.

== Musical style ==
The song is set to a bossa nova style. It is sung by a group of children, which makes unclear what some of the notes sung are. The lyrics are fairly simple and talk about the group of friends being castaways (per the title), lost with no way to go back home.

== Virality ==
The song became viral on TikTok in March 2021 and was included in over 1,200,000 videos on the platform. After achieving virality on the platform, users contributed to the song rising in Spotify charts, with more than 15 million streams. The song's virality has prompted covers and reimagined versions in different genres to be uploaded to TikTok. Merlysha Pierre (swagsurfff) is believed to be the first, or one of the first people, on the platform to upload videos about The Backyardigans and the song "Castaways". The song was later the subject of a video by music theory YouTuber Adam Neely, who talked about the backstory of the song and its production, as well as details regarding its composition and what qualities it has that might have contributed to its popularity.

The song's virality made another song from the show, "Into the Thick of It!", trend in the Spotify Viral 50 United States chart. Another Backyardigans song, "International Super Spy" trended on TikTok later in the year, but did not chart anywhere.

The song has also inspired many remixes and playlists to be released and compiled within months of the viral takeoff.

In June 2022, the song was featured on the latest Nick Jr. series Face's Music Party in the episode "Pirates/Confidence".

== Song credits ==
=== Producer ===
- Evan Lurie
- Douglas Wieselman

=== Songwriters ===
- Douglas Joel Wieselman - composer
- Leslie Antonio Valdes - lyricist
- McPaul Smith Lawrence - lyricist

=== Vocals ===
- Uniqua -Jamia Simone Nash
- Pablo -Sean Curley
- Tyrone- Corwin C. Tuggles

== Charts ==
Castaways debuted on the #1 spot on Spotify's Viral 50 United States chart for May 12, 2021. The song remained #1 on the Viral 50 chart until June 4, 2021, and fell to second place on June 5, 2021.
