= Janice Burgess =

American television producer (1952–2024)

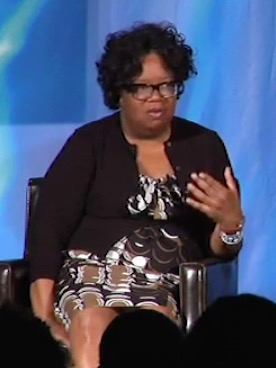
- Burgess in 2010
- Born: March 1, 1952; Pittsburgh, Pennsylvania, U.S.
- Died: March 2, 2024 (aged 72); New York City, U.S.
- Education: The Ellis School; Brandeis University (BA)
- Occupations: Screenwriter; producer; television executive
- Known for: The Backyardigans; Winx Club

Janice Burgess (March 1, 1952 – March 2, 2024) was an American television executive, screenwriter and producer for Nickelodeon. She created the Nick Jr. series The Backyardigans and worked as a writer and story editor for Nickelodeon's revival of Winx Club. Both shows were produced at the Nickelodeon Animation Studio. Burgess joined Nickelodeon in 1995 as executive-in-charge of production.

== Early life and education ==
Burgess was born in Pittsburgh, Pennsylvania, where she grew up in the Squirrel Hill neighborhood and attended the Ellis School. She frequently played in her backyard, and she later used those memories as inspiration for The Backyardigans. "I really remember it as a wonderful, happy, safe place... you could have these great adventures just romping around. From there, you could go anywhere or do anything." She loved musicals, and her mother frequently played a wide array of music. Planning to become an art historian, she graduated from Brandeis University in 1974 with a bachelor's degree in art history.

== Career ==
According to an interview with Investor's Business Daily, Burgess did not enjoy traveling "in art circles with collectors and high society," so she sought out a different career after college. She volunteered for a job at the public television station WQED, where she was put in charge of craft services.

In the early 1990s, Burgess held positions at the Children's Television Workshop, including as an assistant travel coordinator for 3-2-1 Contact and project manager for Ghostwriter. For the latter, she coordinated the efforts of a tie-in magazine and teacher materials with the content and goals of the television show. It was during this job that she was notified of an opening at Nickelodeon; Burgess joked that she interviewed for the job "about 11,000 times." She was hired as the executive in charge of production for Nick Jr., overseeing the development of Blue's Clues and Little Bill. Burgess later became the vice president of Nickelodeon's Nick Jr. division.

=== The Backyardigans ===
While working as an executive, Burgess attended scripting and concept development meetings, where she enjoyed helping the creative teams with characters and storylines. Burgess was eventually given the opportunity to transition to a creative role by the senior vice president of Nick Jr, Brown Johnson. She asked Burgess to develop an idea for a new Nick Jr. show, and Burgess produced a pilot episode called "Me and My Friends" at Nickelodeon Studios Florida in 1998. The pilot was a live-action, full-body puppet show that featured music and dance; it was not picked up for a full series. Several months after the rejection, Brown Johnson asked Burgess to retool the concept, as she liked the characters and music from Burgess's pilot and felt the show would work better in animation.

Using the characters from "Me and My Friends," Burgess wrote a second pilot, which was produced at Nickelodeon's New York studio in 2002. The show, now fully animated and renamed The Backyardigans, was greenlit for a full season of 20 episodes. Reflecting on the shift to animation, Burgess said, "Sometimes your first attempt is just not all that great. In this case, my second attempt was much better." The Backyardigans premiered on Nickelodeon on October 11, 2004.

I really enjoy a big adventure. I think Die Hard is one of the greatest films ever, not to mention Terminator 2. I love those big films... I wanted to bring some of that fantastical nature to young children, but to do it in a way that is safe, hopefully not scary, and not 'imitatable' except in your head.

— Janice Burgess on the inspirations for The Backyardigans

Burgess served as executive producer for The Backyardigans throughout its run of four seasons. In 2006, she described her work on the show positively: "making The Backyardigans has become sort of like an adventure that I go on with my friends. Of course, we get paid, but we do get to be carefree in our work, enjoy each other, hang around a lot, travel a little bit, and make up stuff."

Burgess drew inspiration from action films when writing episodes of the show, as she wanted to adapt high-stakes stories for a young audience. She also was inspired by memories of playing in her own childhood backyard. The series received eight Daytime Emmy Award nominations, and Burgess won the 2008 Emmy for Outstanding Special Class Animated Program. After The Backyardigans wrapped production in 2010 on the fourth and final season, much of the series' staff members regrouped to work on Nickelodeon's Winx Club, including Burgess. She worked as a writer, story editor, and creative consultant on the action-adventure series.

== Death ==
Burgess died in hospice care in Manhattan on March 2, 2024, the day after her 72nd birthday. She was diagnosed with breast cancer in 2018, six years prior.
