= Sofie Zamchick =

American singer-songwriter (born 1994)

- Born: Sofie Zamchick; April 2, 1994 (age 32)
- Genres: Indie pop, indie folk
- Occupations: Singer, songwriter, actress, voiceover artist, puppeteer
- Instruments: Vocals, guitar, piano, marimba, percussion
- Years active: 1997–present
- Website: Website

Sofie Zamchick (born April 2, 1994) is an American singer, songwriter, actress, and voiceover artist. She is best known as the voice of Linny the Guinea Pig on the American animated children's television series, Wonder Pets!. Zamchick attended Juilliard Pre-College throughout high school and the Experimental Theatre Wing at NYU's Tisch School of the Arts. She is a versatile musician and plays the marimba, guitar, piano, and various other instruments.

Zamchick grew up in Tenafly, New Jersey and attended Tenafly High School.

== Acting ==
Zamchick has acted and sung in television shows, films, commercials, and voiceovers. As early as the age of 11, she had already appeared in three Metropolitan Opera productions, the "American Girl Revue" musical at The American Girl Place, Kidz Bop CDs, two Eve Sussman films, and sang for Matthew Barney's Cremaster 3. The operas were Rusalka, Marriage of Figaro, and La Juive. She also co-starred with Whoopi Goldberg playing a cat named TJ on the Nick Jr. program, Whoopi's Littleburg. Other notable works include Priscilla, The Rape of the Sabine Women, and 89 Seconds at Alcázar. She was also featured in a Virgin Mobile commercial with musician Wyclef Jean.

=== Wonder Pets! ===
Zamchick played the voice of the main character, Linny the Guinea Pig, on the Emmy Award-winning television series, the Wonder Pets!.
