= Whoopi's Littleburg =

- Genre: Children; Preschool
- Created by: Jonny Belt; Robert Scull
- Written by: Alan Katz
- Directed by: Robert Scull; Tim Hill
- Starring: Whoopi Goldberg; Josh Gustin; Sean Curley; Sofie Zamchick; Mary Birdsong; Dr. John
- Composers: Whoopi Goldberg; Dr. John; Guy Davis
- Country of origin: United States
- Original language: English
- No. of seasons: 1
- No. of episodes: 3

Production
- Executive producers: Jonny Belt; Robert Scull; Whoopi Goldberg
- Producers: Tom Leonardis; Jill Katz
- Running time: 30 minutes
- Production companies: Lil' Whoop Productions, Inc. Shot in the Dark Productions; Nick Jr. Productions

Original release
- Network: Nickelodeon
- Release: January 18 – June 7, 2004

Whoopi's Littleburg is a musical puppet animated television miniseries of three specials produced for Nickelodeon's Nick Jr. block. It was created by Jonny Belt and Robert Scull, the latter of whom co-directed the show along with Tim Hill and later made the more notable The Backyardigans and Bubble Guppies also for Nickelodeon. The show uses a blend of puppetry and live-action characters.

The miniseries focuses on a five-year-old piglet named Spencer, who has recently moved to the town of Littleburg. Young children and puppets make up the majority of the population and hold the community's jobs, and very few adult characters are seen. The only major adult characters are Spencer's mother and Mayor Whoopi (portrayed by Whoopi Goldberg), whose behavior resembles that of a preschool teacher. The setting was modeled after a nursery school classroom. Multiple original songs are woven into each story, normally in conjunction with the episode's moral. Whoopi Goldberg, Dr. John, and Guy Davis composed the theme music.

== Characters ==
=== Main ===
- Spencer Piggle (voiced by Josh Gustin and singing voice by Sean Curley) is a light-pink pig and the newest Littleburg citizen. He is five years old.
- Mayor Whoopi (played by Whoopi Goldberg) is Spencer's tour guide around Littleburg, and the only major human character in the series.
- TJ/Tiger Jane (performed by Sofie Zamchick) is a light-purple cat who is Spencer's closest friend. She is six years old.
- Mrs. Peg Piggle (performed by Mary Birdsong) is Spencer's mother, who teaches him about the town through song.
- Peggy Piggle is Spencer's baby sister.
- The Sun (voiced by Dr. John) is an anthropomorphic Sun (who can set and become the Moon at night) seen above Littleburg.
- Phil is a horse with a love of painting. He is dressed in a necktie.
- Dave is a chicken who is almost always seen with his favorite food, pretzels.
- Gordy (performed by Timothy Doner) is a male bird that is green and yellow. He is the town shouter. He is two years old and learns new words.

=== Guest stars ===
Rosie Perez, Mary Testa, and Sandra Bernhard made guest appearances on the show.

== Episodes ==
Three specials and a pilot episode were produced.

=== Pilot (2003) ===
Title	Original release date
"Pilot"	2003
Spencer, a piglet, moves to a town inhabited by preschoolers. "Welcome to Littleburg" uses a similar plotline.

=== Season 1 (2004) ===
No.	Title	Original release date
1	"Welcome to Littleburg"	January 18, 2004
Spencer attempts to make new friends. Guest star: Mary Testa as the Sock Lady
2	"Tah-Dah! Day"	March 19, 2004
Spencer worries that he has trouble thinking of a talent to demonstrate at Littleburg's Tah-Dah! Day celebration, so his friends must help him find it. Guest star: Sandra Bernhard as the Macaroni Lady
3	"But I Still Like You"	June 7, 2004
Spencer and TJ quit the sleepover after arguing and deciding to not play with each other after TJ accidentally breaks Spencer's flashlight that he got from the circus when he was little. So Mayor Whoopi and Spencer's mother must help them understand that, even though friends and family members get mad at each other sometimes, that doesn't mean they won't love each other anymore. Guest star: Rosie Perez as the Flashlight Lady

== Release ==
Whoopi's Littleburg was first announced at Nickelodeon's upfront presentation on March 24, 2003. In June, it joined the channel's 2004–05 programming slate. It was advertised as a series of specials. Episodes were aired sporadically throughout 2004, with reruns shown once weekly. During its run, VITAC representatives deemed Littleburg "educational enough" to receive free closed captioning and subtitling. In 2006, the series' soundtrack was released to Nick Jr. Radio, a webcasting station featuring songs from preschool-oriented programs.

== Reception ==
The miniseries received positive reviews from critics, many of which praised its music and appeal towards multiple age groups. The Hollywood Reporter's Marilyn Moss stated that Whoopi's Littleburg was "a lively and educational adventure into a friendly television space" and that the series was "likely to attract a wide audience." Writing for The New York Times, Kathryn Shattuck called the series a "saga of empowerment" and dubbed the series' songs "fanciful." Lynne Heffley of the Los Angeles Times praised the show's music, saying that it "is a standout component, woven deftly throughout." In his review for The Christian Science Monitor, M.S. Mason noted that "this amusing, sweet-natured show for tiny tots will earn kudos from parents as well. Whoopi Goldberg has a wonderful ability to make kids giggle with the aid of puppets." Jacqueline Cutler of the Hays Daily News lauded Goldberg's performance in particular and felt that "Goldberg emanates no-nonsense warmth. When she talks to the puppets, she neither camps it up or talks down, and that even approach makes the show work."
