= Nickelodeon Digital =

American animation studio

Nickelodeon Digital Nickelodeon Animation Studio New York
- Formerly: Nickelodeon Creative Labs (1994–99)
- Type: Division
- Industry: Animation; Digital content
- Founded: 1994; 32 years ago
- Founder: Amy Friedman
- Headquarters: New York City; Burbank, California (2001–present)
- Owner: Skydance Corporation
- Parent: Nickelodeon Animation Studio

Nickelodeon Digital, often shortened to Nick Digital and originally known as Nickelodeon Creative Labs, is an American animation studio based in New York City which opened in 1994. It is a division of Nickelodeon Animation Studio. Nickelodeon Digital produces some of Nickelodeon's animated series and creates digital content and motion graphics for the Nickelodeon Group. The company's Burbank, California branch creates CGI and visual effects for Nickelodeon's animated series.

Nick Digital has also worked on shows for other Viacom networks, including TV Land, Noggin, and Spike TV.

== History ==
Nickelodeon Creative Labs was founded in 1994 by Amy Friedman. The company produced motion graphics and short-form material for the Nickelodeon network, including the award-winning Short Films by Short People interstitial series. Soon after its founding in 1994, Nickelodeon Creative Labs introduced an animated mascot consisting of two eyes & a mouth voiced by Chris Phillips for Nick Jr. named Face, who would also often change to a different color and interact with the block's characters (on-screen and off). In 1996, Nickelodeon Creative Labs began producing the Nick Jr. series Blue's Clues in-house using Adobe After Effects, Photoshop, and Power Macintosh computers.

In October 1999, Nickelodeon Creative Labs relaunched as Nick Digital; it was now also producing Little Bill, another Nick Jr. series. In 2001, a Nick Digital branch at Nickelodeon Animation Studio began producing visual effects for Nickelodeon's animated series. The same year, Nick Digital produced the second Backyardigans pilot (featuring the same synopsis as the later episode "The Heart of the Jungle"). The studio used CGI and motion capture, a method that was ultimately rejected by creator Janice Burgess.

== List of productions ==
| Name | Year(s) | Notes |
|---|---|---|
| Face | 1994–2003 | interstitial series; animation production from 2000 to 2003 |
| Natalie's Backseat Traveling Web Show | 1996–97 | interstitial series |
| Blue's Clues | 1996–2004 | |
| Little Bill | 1999–2002 | |
| Garbage Boy | 1999 | short film |
| SpongeBob's Nicktoon Summer Splash | 2000–01 | interstitial series |
| Dora the Explorer | 2000–14 | |
| Astrology with Squidward | 2000 | interstitial series |
| Nick Jr. Presents | 2000 | interstitial series |
| Blue's Big Musical Movie | 2000 | |
| 2001 Kids' Choice Awards | 2001 | animated graphics |
| Nick Jr. Just for Me Stories | 2001 | interstitial series |
| The Baseball Card Shop | 2001 | short film |
| 2002 Kids' Choice Awards | 2002 | Jimmy Neutron and SpongeBob SquarePants segments |
| Noggin Mascot | 2002–03 | interstitial series |
| Play with Me Sesame | 2002–03 | |
| Backyardigans | 2002 | unaired pilot |
| Shpidah! | 2002 | unaired pilot |
| Linny the Guinea Pig | 2003 | interstitial series |
| 2003 Kids' Choice Awards | 2003 | The Fairly OddParents segment |
| The Alan Brady Show | 2003 | TV Land special |
| Gary the Rat | 2003 | |
| This Just In! | 2004 | |
| Blue's Room | 2004–07 | |
| The Backyardigans | 2004–10 | |
| My World: Maya the Indian Princess; Happy Holi, Maya! | 2004–05 | interstitial series |
| Mighty Bug 5 | 2004 | interstitial series |
| Big Shorty | 2004 | unaired pilot |
| Go, Diego, Go! | 2005–11 | |
| Umizumis | 2006 | unaired pilot |
| Bubble Guppies | 2006 | unaired pilot |
| Lolly and the Pipsqueaks | 2006 | unaired pilot |
| Friday: The Animated Series | 2007–08 | |
| Chickiepoo and Fluff: Barnyard Detectives | 2007 | interstitial series and unaired pilot |
| Nicktoons Film Festival 5 | 2008 | opening & bumpers |
| Bubble Guppies | 2011–23 | |
| Charlie and Mr. Two | 2013 | short film |
| Wallykazam! | 2014–17 | |
| Welcome to the Wayne | 2014–19 | |
| Dora and Friends: Into the City! | 2014–17 | |
| Blaze and the Monster Machines | 2014–21 | |
| Bad Bad Bunny | 2014 | short film |
| Butterbean's Café | 2018–20 | |

=== Visual effects ===
- SpongeBob SquarePants (1999–present)
- Cry Baby Lane (2000)
- The Fairly OddParents (2001–17)
- Invader Zim (2001–04)
- Maniac Magee (2003)
- Stripperella (2003–04)
- Whoopi's Littleburg (2004)
- Fatherhood (2004–05)
- Avatar: The Last Airbender (2005–08)
- Catscratch (2005–07)
- The X's (2005–07)
- Holly Hobbie & Friends (specials, 2006–07)
- Random! Cartoons (2006–07)
- El Tigre: The Adventures of Manny Rivera (2007–08)
- The Modifyers (2007; pilot)
- Tak and the Power of Juju (2007–09)
- Ni Hao, Kai-Lan (2007–11)
- The Mighty B! (2008–11)
- The Penguins of Madagascar (2008–12)
- Fanboy & Chum Chum (2009–12)
- T.U.F.F. Puppy (2010–13)
- Winx Club (2011–16)
- Kung Fu Panda: Legends of Awesomeness (2011–13)
- Robot and Monster (2012–14)
- Sanjay and Craig (2013–16)
- Earmouse and Bottle (2013; short film)
- Breadwinners (2014–16)
- Harvey Beaks (2015–17)
- Pig Goat Banana Cricket (2015–18)
- Shimmer and Shine (2015–20)
- The Loud House (2016–present)
- Bunsen Is a Beast (2017–18)
- Hey Arnold!: The Jungle Movie (2017)
- Rocko's Modern Life: Static Cling (2019)
- Invader Zim: Enter the Florpus (2019)
- The Casagrandes (2019–22)
