= ClickStart =

Children's computer system

The ClickStart (with the slogan My First Computer) is an educational computer system created for children aged between 3 and 6 years (toddler to kindergarten) by LeapFrog Enterprises and was introduced in 2007. It is LeapFrog's second home console, and the first to come with its own games. The entire system consists of a console unit and a wireless keyboard and mouse set. It is also designed to have specifically designed cartridges to be inserted into it, simply called My First Computer Software. The console also introduces Scout, a green-colored dog character who also appears in later LeapFrog products.

== System ==
The system consists of a base console unit (the CPU, which connects to a TV and accepts the software cartridges) and a wireless keyboard with a single-button optical mouse and mouse pad attached. The mouse pad is attached to the right-hand side of the keyboard by default, but can be removed and re-attached to the left-hand side of the keyboard to cater to left-handers as necessary. The keyboard accepts four AA-sized batteries and communicates with the console by means of four infrared transmitter LEDs. It also has a red LED to that lights up upon pressing a key or moving the mouse.

Signal sent from the keyboard is incompatible with other infrared keyboard receivers, however. Despite the red LED only blinking when the keyboard is being used, the keyboard constantly transmits a signal (apparently remaining battery strength) unless it is left unused for a few minutes, in which then it would automatically shut itself off. It can be turned back on by just pressing any of the keys on the keyboard or pressing the mouse button. The mouse can be replaced in the event of the cord or the mouse breaking down. The back of the keyboard includes a groove in which the mouse can be clipped on for storage.

The console unit consists of a single IR receiver, a power switch on the front, a cartridge slot and grooves to hold six other cartridges on the top, a power in socket (for use with a 5v DC adapter which is sold separately, although other compatible 5v DC adapters can be used at the expense of the warranty of the console) and a lead with an RCA-style video out and monaural audio out jack around the back, and a port on the left side of the console. The port is a mini 6-DIN connector and its purpose and use is unknown as it is neither mentioned nor explained in the manual. Additionally, two of the pins are blocked, making it impossible to connect standard PS/2 devices to the console. The console is capable of booting and is fully functional even without a cartridge inserted. The console part of the system takes four C-Sized batteries, or a DC 5v power adapter. Also worth mentioning is the console contains a TV system switch in the battery compartment, allowing the console to work in both PAL and NTSC environments, indicating possibility that the console is region-free.

The system, as of 2024, is sold in both violet and green color varieties. Originally, the system was only available in green and was not shipped with any games at all (possibly explaining the reason why the console is designed to operate even without a cartridge inserted). However, with the introduction of the violet colored variant of the system, the packaging was revamped and a game cartridge is now included. The green system kit is shipped with a copy of Finding Nemo: Sea of Keys, while the violet system kit is shipped with a copy of Disney Princess: The Love of Letters. Most recently, a version with British accent voices was introduced for the British market. It appears that regardless of voice accent in the main menu, both versions will support games from either regions.

== Storyline and usage ==
Screenshot of the ClickStart main menu, with Scout on the bottom-left corner of the screen. The Scout's Puppy Pals cartridge is present on the console.

When the console is used for the first time, an adult is required to set up the user for the console. This includes the user's name, and difficulty level. Upon completion, the child is allowed to log in for the first time, in which Tad and Dot (two LeapFrog characters) gift the user a puppy, Scout. Apparently the user is to babysit Scout while Tad and Dot are away. Subsequent log-ins will start with Tad and Dot coming on-screen and calling Scout into view before leaving. From here, the main menu appears and the user is given access to four built-in games, the cartridge game if its present, and Scout's dog house, in which the user can go to interact with Scout and the multiple items inside it. Playing any of the built-in games will earn the user dog biscuits or bones, which could be given to Scout in the dog house to have him perform tricks.

The four built-in games are:

- Inbox - Allows the user to receive "e-cards" from an adult or other users if an e-card sent from the settings screen. If no e-card was sent from the settings screen, a game featuring Dot or Tad will trigger.
- ABC Tree - Allows the user to practice basic keyboarding skills.
- Type Time - Also allows the user to practice basic keyboarding and spelling skills. Has a free-type mode, but with a bad word blacklist in place it prevents the user from spelling out obscenities and even some valid words.
- 123 Click - Allows the user to practice basic mousing, colors and pre-math skills.

The console allows up to three users to be set up in addition to a guest mode. User data is stored on the console itself. Additionally, a settings mode allows the parent or guardian to adjust the difficulty settings as desired, or even send a postcard to a desired user. Sending a postcard for the first time requires a password from the LeapFrog website to unlock. The password is SCOUT.

== List of games ==
- Learning Carnival
- Scout's Puppy Pals
- Animal Art Studio
- Finding Nemo: Sea of Keys
- Thomas & Friends: Learning Destinations
- Toy Story: To 100 and Beyond!
- The Backyardigans: Number Pie Samurai
- Disney Princess: The Love of Letters
- Cars: The Road to Learning
- Dora the Explorer: Friends! ¡Amigos!
- Go, Diego, Go!: Learning Expeditions
- Bob the Builder: Project: Learn It
- Ni Hao, Kai-Lan
