= Doug Wieselman =

American musician and composer (born 1954)

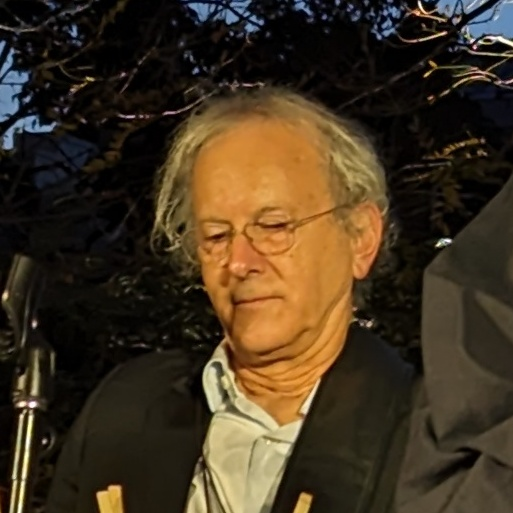
- Wieselman in 2023

Background information
- Born: Douglas Joel Wieselman; November 30, 1954 (age 71); Los Angeles, California, U.S.
- Genres: Jazz
- Instruments: Clarinet; soprano saxophone; baritone saxophone

Douglas Joel Wieselman (born November 30, 1954) is an American composer and jazz musician. He plays primarily clarinet and tenor saxophone, though he occasionally also plays soprano and baritone saxophone.

== Early life and education ==
Wieselman was born in Los Angeles. He earned a bachelor's degree in music at University of California, Santa Cruz in 1976, where he first played with Wayne Horvitz; he played with Horvitz extensively into the 1990s.

== Career ==
In 1982, Wieselman began working with Robin Holcomb, and played with her again from 1987 to 1996. In the late 1980s he also worked with Bill Frisell, Guy Klucevsek, and Anthony Coleman. He started his own group, the Kamikaze Ground Crew, in 1983, with Gina Leishman, and also co-founded the New York Composer's Orchestra in 1986. Other credits include work with Karen Mantler, Nels Cline, Ben Perowsky, and others.

In addition to his work in jazz, Wieselman has also written music for the performances of the Flying Karamazov Brothers and played as a session musician for pop and rock acts such as She & Him, Cibo Matto, Anohni and the Johnsons, Joan As Police Woman, Iron and Wine, Lou Reed, Yo la Tengo, Martha Wainwright, Shudder To Think, Translator, Shearwater and others. He was also a lead composer on The Backyardigans, from which his song "Castaways" became a viral hit on TikTok in 2021.

== Discography ==
- Todos Santos with Wayne Horvitz (Sound Aspects Records, 1988)
- Dimly Lit (Tzadik Records, 2003)
- From Water (88 Records, 2014)

With Marc Ribot's Ceramic Dog

- YRU Still Here? (Northern Spy, 2018)
