= Reservation Road =

2007 film by Terry George

- Theatrical release poster
- Directed by: Terry George
- Written by: John Burnham Schwartz; Terry George
- Based on: Reservation Road by John Burnham Schwartz
- Produced by: Nick Wechsler; A. Kitman Ho
- Starring: Joaquin Phoenix; Mark Ruffalo; Jennifer Connelly; Mira Sorvino
- Cinematography: John Lindley
- Edited by: Naomi Geraghty
- Music by: Mark Isham
- Production company: Random House Films
- Distributed by: Focus Features
- Release dates: September 13, 2007 (Toronto International Film Festival); October 19, 2007 (United States)
- Running time: 98 minutes
- Country: United States
- Language: English
- Box office: $1.8 million

Reservation Road is a 2007 American crime drama film directed by Terry George and based on the book of the same title by John Burnham Schwartz, who, along with George, adapted the novel for the screenplay. The film, starring Joaquin Phoenix, Jennifer Connelly, and Mark Ruffalo, deals with the aftermath of a fatal car crash. It was released to theaters on October 19, 2007.

== Plot ==
Dwight Arno is an attorney going through a divorce from his wife Ruth. As part of the divorce agreement, Ruth has custody of their son Lucas while Dwight has visitation rights. Dwight takes Lucas to a baseball game. When Dwight and Lucas leave the game, Ruth calls Dwight to remind him that he is late in returning Lucas home. Dwight, worried of losing his visitation rights, drives Lucas home in a rush. Dwight loses control of his vehicle and strikes a young boy, Josh Learner, standing by the roadside. Dwight, panicked, drives away and tells Lucas they collided with a tree log.

Josh does not survive the accident. Dwight learns of Josh's death on the news. Overwhelmed with guilt and fear, he frantically attempts to cover up evidence linking him to the hit-and-run. Meanwhile, Josh's mother, Grace, slowly begins to move on from the death of her son, but her husband Ethan is determined to find the perpetrator and bring them to justice. Ethan decides to hire a lawyer, who happens to be Dwight.

Dwight is consumed with guilt and contemplates turning himself in to the police. When he goes to the police station, the investigating officer mistakes him for Ethan's lawyer and tells him that the case is going nowhere. Dwight leaves the station without confessing. When he picks up his daughter Emma from her piano lessons with Ruth, Dwight is forced to face his guilt and the reality of his situation. Dwight asks Ruth to take care of Lucas for a week, telling her that it will be the last week for a long time.

Ethan privately investigates the case; eventually discovers the horrifying truth that Dwight is the perpetrator. Angered at this revelation, Ethan confronts Dwight with a gun. Ethan forces Dwight into the trunk of his car and lets him out after a short drive. Dwight grabs the gun, pointing it at Ethan, then himself and begins to cry, saying how he wishes he had died instead of Josh. Ethan leaves Dwight to deal with his remorse. The film ends with Lucas, watching a taped confession of Dwight's hit-and-run.

== Cast ==
- Joaquin Phoenix as Ethan Learner
- Mark Ruffalo as Dwight Arno
- Jennifer Connelly as Grace Learner
- Mira Sorvino as Ruth Wheldon
- Elle Fanning as Emma Learner
- Eddie Alderson as Lucas Arno
- Sean Curley as Josh Learner
- Antoni Corone as Sergeant Burke
- John Slattery as Steve Cutter

== Production ==
=== Filming ===
The film was shot in Stamford, Connecticut, starting in late October, 2006, with the very first city scene from Annapolis, Maryland, and the next scene at Cove Island Park in Stamford. Parts of the movie were also filmed at Lake Compounce Amusement Park in Bristol, Connecticut, and the Olde Blue Bird Inn & Gas Station and adjacent Baseball Field in Easton, Connecticut. Shots of Martha's Vineyard, Massachusetts are used in the trailer and movie.

== Release ==
Reservation Road grossed a total of $36,269 in its first weekend. It ended up making $121,994 in the United States, and ended with a worldwide gross of $1,783,190. The film was released on DVD on April 8, 2008.

== Reception ==
The film received mixed reviews from critics. Metacritic gives the film an average score of 46 out of 100, based on 29 reviews. Rotten Tomatoes gives the film 38% based on reviews from 112 critics, with an average rating of 5.23/10. The website's critics consensus reads, "While the performances are fine, Reservation Road quickly adopts an excessively maudlin tone along with highly improbable plot turns."
