= Bicycle Days =

1989 novel by John Burnham Schwartz

- First edition (US)
- Author: John Burnham Schwartz
- Cover artist: Scott Hunt
- Language: English
- Publisher: Summit Books (US); Heinemann (UK)
- Publication date: 1989
- Publication place: United States
- Media type: Print
- Pages: 255
- ISBN: 0-671-66600-2

Bicycle Days is the debut novel by American author John Burnham Schwartz published in 1989 on his 24th birthday. It began as an undergraduate thesis for Harvard's Department of East Asian Studies and became a critically acclaimed bestseller. It was inspired by his time living in Japan.

== Plot ==
The book follows Alec Stern as he arrives in Tokyo, newly graduated from Yale. He starts a new job, living with a Japanese family; the book portrays his life in Japan as he adapts to the culture, made far easier by his ability to speak Japanese ...

== Reception ==
Reviews were generally positive :

- The New York Times, "Reminiscent of A Good Man in Africa...or one of Kingsley Amis's gentler comodies of manners."
- Publishers Weekly called this a "promising, if overly self-absorbed debut novel."
- People commented "it's too bad Schwartz wrote his intimate story in the third person. As it is, Schwartz outlines the most incidental happenings of Alec's life without letting us get inside his mind. It's as if a great deal yet not nearly enough has been revealed in Bicycle Days."
