= Kristin Klabunde =

American actress (born 1991)

Kristin Danielle Klabunde (born September 12, 1991, in New Jersey) is an American actress and singer. She is the singing voice of Tasha on the Nickelodeon animated preschool series The Backyardigans. She has had guest roles on television including Saturday Night Live, As the World Turns, and Gilmore Girls.

== Career on Broadway ==
On Broadway, she played Molly and Annie in Annie, and Young Cosette and Young Éponine in Les Misérables. Off-Broadway, she played Mary in The Secret Garden, Pearl in The Scarlet Letter, and Sarah Crew in A Little Princess.

== Personal life ==
Klabunde volunteers at charity events including Kids with a Cause, Kids Helping Kids Charity, Children's Hope International Coalition, and Make a Wish Foundation. She lives in North Hollywood, California.
