= The Backyardigans =

Animated children's television series

- Also known as: Backyardigans
- Genre: Adventure; Comedy; Musical
- Created by: Janice Burgess
- Directed by: Bill Giggie (season 1); Mike Shiell (seasons 1–2); Dave Palmer (seasons 3–4)
- Voices of: Various; see below
- Composers: Evan Lurie; Douglas Wieselman
- Countries of origin: United States; Canada
- Original language: English
- No. of seasons: 4
- No. of episodes: 80 (list of episodes)

Production
- Executive producers: Nickelodeon: Janice Burgess; Robert Scull; Jonny Belt; Kay Wilson Stallings; Nelvana Limited: Scott Dyer; Doug Murphy; Paul Robertson
- Running time: 21–23 minutes
- Production companies: Nelvana Limited; Nickelodeon Animation Studio (Note: Credited as Nick Jr. Productions (seasons 1-3) and Nickelodeon Productions (season 4))

Original release
- Network: Nickelodeon (United States); Treehouse TV (Canada)
- Release: October 11, 2004 (Note: The series was first previewed in Canada on Treehouse TV on September 11, 2004, followed by its official debut on Nickelodeon in the USA on October 11, 2004.) – July 12, 2013

The Backyardigans (/bækˈjɑːrdɪɡənz/ bak-YAR-dih-gənz) is an animated musical children's television series created by Janice Burgess for Nickelodeon. The series was written and recorded at Nickelodeon Animation Studio and co-produced with Nelvana. It centers on five anthropomorphic animal neighbors who imagine themselves on fantastic adventures in their backyard. Each episode is set to a different musical genre and features four songs, composed by Evan Lurie with lyrics by McPaul Smith. The Backyardigans' adventures span many different genres and settings. The show's writers took inspiration from action-adventure films, and many episodes are parodies of films.

Janice Burgess had been a production executive at Nick Jr. since the mid-1990s. The Backyardigans originated as a live-action pilot episode titled "Me and My Friends", filmed at Nickelodeon Studios Florida and completed in September 1998. The characters were played by full-body puppets on an indoor stage. The pilot was rejected by Nickelodeon, and Burgess decided to rework the concept into an animated series. In 2001, a second pilot was animated at Nickelodeon Digital in New York. It was completed and screened in early 2002. The second pilot was successful, and the series entered production in 2003.

The show ran for four seasons, totaling 80 episodes. Most episodes aired on Nickelodeon on weekday mornings. A fifth season of the series was planned to be produced in 2009. However, in 2010, Burgess decided to move on to a different series: Nickelodeon's revival of Winx Club. Burgess worked as a creative director and writer for Winx Club before eventually retiring from Nickelodeon in 2014.

The Backyardigans received generally positive reviews from audiences and critics who consider it superior to Nickelodeon's other preschool shows because its writing was sophisticated and enjoyable for older viewers. The New York Times and Common Sense Media commended the show for including frequent nods to an older audience, such as references to action-adventure franchises. The quality of the show's music was also well received by critics, and the show received eight Daytime Emmy Award nominations for its music.

== Plot ==
The show centers around a group of five animal neighbors named Uniqua, Pablo, Tyrone, Tasha, and Austin. They share a large backyard between their houses. In each episode, they meet in the backyard and imagine themselves on a fantastical adventure. Their adventures span a variety of different genres and settings; many episodes involve visiting different parts of the world, traveling back or forward in time, and using magic or supernatural powers. The characters give themselves different jobs or roles depending on the episode's imaginary setting, such as detectives, knights, or scientists. From the second season onward, many episodes are parodies of action-adventure films such as James Bond, Star Trek, Indiana Jones, and Ghostbusters.

The openings and endings of the episodes follow a similar pattern. The stories begin with the characters in the backyard, introducing themselves and explaining the scenario they are about to imagine, which causes the backyard to transform into an environment fitting the scenario they are imagining. When the Backyardigans finish their adventure, their stomachs begin to growl, leading to them deciding to have a snack at one of their houses. As they return home, the fantasy sequence fades, restoring the original backyard setting. The characters sing a closing song, say their goodbyes to the audience, then walk inside the house that belongs to the snack inviter and close the door. As the episode ends, at least one character reopens the door and shouts a phrase related to the adventure.

The show follows the format of a stage musical. Each episode is set to a different genre of music and features four songs. The characters sing and dance to the songs with original choreography. The song and dance routines are often used to introduce a character's imaginary role, further the plot, or explain a problem. In addition to singing songs in a new genre each episode, the show's background music changes to match, scoring all of the Backyardigans' actions.

== Characters ==
The five main characters of the series. From left to right: Tyrone, Pablo, Uniqua, Austin, and Tasha

In the Canadian/American dub, each of the five main characters on the show has a separate voice actor for speaking and singing voices. Meanwhile, the voice actors in the European dub provide both speaking and singing voices. Live-action dancers first performed the dancing on the show, and their movements were later transported to animation. Choreographer Beth Bogush described the process: "What we do is we film the live footage in the studio, send that off, and they do a leica, and then they send it to the animators. The animators watch and were pretty precise. What we film for that day is pretty close to what you see in the character."

=== Main ===
- Uniqua is a pink-spotted unique creature of indeterminate species who is very curious, self-confident, and adventurous. She likes to tell jokes and make her friends laugh. The series uses the name "Uniqua" for both the character and her unique species. She usually imagines herself having roles that require brains and courage, such as a scientist or pirate captain. Creator Janice Burgess described Uniqua as the child she wished she was like as a child. She is the only Backyardigan to appear in every episode. Her voices are provided by:
  - LaShawn Jefferies - speaking
  - Jamia Simone Nash - singing (Seasons 1–3)
  - Avion Baker - singing (Season 4)
  - Lizzie Waterworth - UK dub
- Pablo is a blue penguin who is high-strung, frenetic, and tends to overreact. Due to his energy and impetuousness, he often goes into a "panic attack" when he faces an obstacle, running around in circles and telling his friends not to worry until someone gets his attention by calling his name three times. Pablo's panic attacks became less prominent after the first season, though in the fourth-season episode "The Flipper!", his propensity for getting overexcited is the main plot point. He is best friends with Tyrone. He appears in every episode with the exception of the third-season episode, "Chichen-Itza Pizza". His voices are provided by:
  - Zach Tyler Eisen - speaking (Season 1)
  - Jake Goldberg - speaking (Seasons 2–4)
  - Sean Curley - singing
  - Janet James - UK dub
- Tyrone is a red-haired orange moose who is laid-back and cool-headed. He is best friends with Pablo, of whom he is almost the complete opposite in terms of personality, with his calm and easygoing character. Tyrone is known for his sarcastic comments, one of them being "That certainly was convenient." At the end of most episodes, he says, "That was an excellent adventure, don't you think?" Despite not appearing to wear pants, Tyrone somehow manages to put his hands in his pockets. His voices are provided by:
  - Reginald Davis Jr. - speaking (Season 1 to Season 2 Episode 3)
  - Jordan Coleman - speaking (Season 2 Episode 4 to Season 3)
  - Chris Grant Jr. - speaking (Season 4)
  - Corwin C. Tuggles - singing (Season 1)
  - Leon Thomas III - singing (Season 2 to Season 3 Episode 5)
  - Damani Roberts - singing (Season 3 Episodes 6–8)
  - Tyrel Jackson Williams - singing (Season 3 Episode 9 to Season 4)
  - Maria Darling - UK dub (Seasons 1–2)
  - Emma Tate - UK dub (Seasons 3–4)
- Tasha is a strong-willed yellow hippopotamus who is rational, skeptical, and highly motivated, as well as occasionally bossy, wanting things being done her way. She is the most serious of the Backyardigans, though she can be just as easygoing as the others from time to time. She is more feminine than the tomboyish Uniqua. Her catchphrase is "Oh, for goodness sakes!" Nickelodeon describes Tasha as "deceptively sweet" and "tough-as-nails." Her voices are provided by:
  - Naelee Rae - speaking (Seasons 1–2)
  - Gianna Bruzzese - speaking (Seasons 3–4)
  - Kristin Klabunde - singing (Season 1 to Season 3 Episode 5)
  - Gabriella Malek - singing (Season 3 Episode 6 to Season 4)
  - Maria Darling - UK dub (Seasons 1–2)
  - Emma Tate - UK dub (Seasons 3–4)
- Austin is a shy but fun-loving purple kangaroo. In the first season, he is reserved and soft-spoken. In later episodes, Austin becomes more outgoing and is revealed to be smart and imaginative. Austin appears the least frequently of the main cast, but takes the role of the lead character in several episodes. Beth Bogush described him as "the one pulling up the rear. He's kind of a get-along guy." His voices are provided by:
  - Jonah Bobo - speaking
  - Thomas Sharkey - singing (Seasons 1–3)
  - Nicholas Barasch - singing (Season 4)
  - Lizzie Waterworth - UK dub

=== Recurring ===
- The Wormans are a fictional species of colorful worm-like creatures who speak in squeaks and gibberish.
  - Sherman (vocal effects by Oliver Wyman) is a small, orange-spotted yellow Worman. Sherman is easily scared due to his small size. He has a brother named Herman (also voiced by Wyman) who appears in "Polka Palace Party".
- Dragon (vocal effects by Oliver Wyman, singing voice by Adam Pascal) is a friendly, green-colored dragon who appears in the special "Tale of the Mighty Knights" and the episode "The Tale of the Not-So-Nice Dragon". He hatched from a spotted egg and lives inside of Dragon Mountain.
- Green-colored aliens with eyestalks appear in "Mission to Mars", "News Flash", "Los Galacticos", and "The Big Dipper Diner".
- A very hungry, irritable and bad tempered giant clam appears in "The Legend of the Volcano Sisters" and "The Great Dolphin Race". He is very protective of his pearl. He pants and acts like a dog.
- Voices were included in the episodes "Secret Mission" and "It's Great to Be a Ghost!" that do not come from any shown character.
- Robot Roscoe (voiced by Evan Mathew Weinstein) is a robot owned by Austin, who appears in the two-part special "Robot Rampage" and the episode "Elephant on the Run".

== Episodes ==
Season	Episodes	Originally released	
Season	Episodes	First released	Last released
Pilots	2	Unaired	
1	20	October 11, 2004	June 19, 2006
2	20	October 9, 2006	January 17, 2008
3	20	January 14, 2008	June 5, 2009
4	20	October 26, 2009	July 12, 2013

== Production ==
I really enjoy a big adventure. I think Die Hard is one of the greatest films ever, not to mention Terminator 2. I love those big films... I wanted to bring some of that fantastical nature to young children, but to do it in a way that is safe, hopefully not scary, and not 'imitatable' except in your head.

— Janice Burgess on the inspirations for The Backyardigans

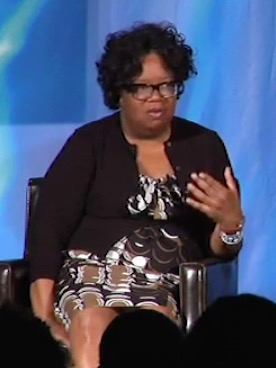
Janice Burgess, the show's creator

Burgess drew inspiration from action films when writing episodes of the show, as she wanted to adapt high-stakes stories for a young audience. In an interview with the Pittsburgh Post-Gazette, Burgess was asked what inspired the show; she responded, "I know this is going to sound very strange, but the things I really draw upon are action films. I like Die Hard, Star Wars, the Tolkien movies ... I thought it would be fun to take kids on that big adventure." The character of Uniqua was based on how Burgess viewed herself as a child; as a result, Uniqua was written as the leader of the Backyardigans, and was the only character who appeared in every episode.

The main characters were based on designs by children's book author and illustrator Dan Yaccarino. Michael Lennicx, an artist at Nick Digital, co-designed the characters.

Before Nickelodeon ordered the first season, two pilot episodes of The Backyardigans were made. The first was a live-action pilot titled "Me and My Friends," filmed at Nickelodeon Studios in September 1998. The characters were played by full-body puppets who danced on an indoor stage. The pilot was rejected by Nickelodeon, and Burgess decided to rework the concept into an animated show. The original pilot was assumed lost for decades, but was leaked online in June 2025.

Between 2001 and 2002, a second pilot was created; it was a computer-animated short produced at Nick Digital. The second pilot was greenlit by Nickelodeon to become a full-length series. Nickelodeon called the show "a home-grown Nick Jr. property," as "the whole creative team... [had] been part of the Nick Jr. family for years."

In December 2009, Nickelodeon Preschool president Brown Johnson stated that Nickelodeon intended to keep the show running for "at least another five years. Maybe forever." Nickelodeon believed that The Backyardigans was an ideal "evergreen" property: a series that would stay in production for a long time through multiple generations. A fifth season was planned in 2009. However, in 2010, Burgess decided to end The Backyardigans to start working on Nickelodeon's newer projects: a revival series of Winx Club. Burgess brought the former Backyardigans crew onto Winx Club as well. This included lyricist McPaul Smith; writers Jeff Borkin, Adam Peltzman, and Carin Greenberg; line producer Sara Kamen; and script coordinator Jonathan Foss. Burgess worked as a story editor, writer, and creative consultant on Winx Club. The crew considered it a natural progression, as Winx Club was also a musical action-adventure show, but it targeted an older audience, allowing them to branch out.

== Reception ==
The Backyardigans received eight Daytime Emmy Award nominations, and Burgess won the 2008 Emmy for Outstanding Special Class Animated Program. In a 2016 article for The Chicago Tribune, drama critic Chris Jones called The Backyardigans "a fabulously inventive TV show." DVD Talk's John Crichton gave the show a "hearty recommendation," citing its "enjoyable (and varied) music score, the character voices (both spoken and singing) and the impressive visual presentation." Slate named the Backyardigans episode "The Swamp Creature" one of the best episodes of children's television.

Critics noted that the series held broad appeal to older viewers, due to its high-quality music and focus on character-driven, non-educational stories. Susan Stewart of The New York Times said "it's hard to say whether The Backyardigans is a fantasy for children or for their parents," commending the show's animation and storytelling. Common Sense Media's Emily Ashby wrote, "It's not always easy to find a show you like as much as your youngsters do, but The Backyardigans definitely has the potential to fit that bill." Journalist Virginia Heffernan wrote, "with each episode devoted not just to a separate quest but also to a different musical genre...the show blows you away with its artistic exactitude."

In 2021, the songs "Castaways" and "Into the Thick of It" went viral on TikTok, with the former appearing in more than 745,000 videos and the latter appearing in more than 46,000 videos as of June 2021. Due to their success on TikTok, "Castaways" and "Into the Thick of It" reached number 5 and 13 respectively on the Spotify viral 50 chart in the US for the week beginning on June 10, 2021.

== Accolades ==
Award	Year	Category	Nominee(s)	Result	Ref.
Annie Awards	2007	Best Animated Television Production for Children	The Backyardigans	Nominated	
Annie Awards	2007	Best Music In a Television Production	Evan Lurie, Robert Scull, and Steven Bernstein (for "International Super Spy")	Nominated	
Daytime Emmy Awards	2007	Outstanding Individual Achievement in Animation	Jeff Astolfo	Won	
Daytime Emmy Awards	2008	Outstanding Special Class Animated Program	The Backyardigans	Won	
Daytime Emmy Awards	2009	Outstanding Children's Animated Program	Janice Burgess, Jonny Belt, Robert Scull, Ellen Martin, Scott Dyer, Pam Lehn, and Jennifer Hill	Nominated	
Daytime Emmy Awards	2009	Outstanding Achievement in Music Direction and Composition	Evan Lurie and Doug Wieselman	Nominated	
Daytime Emmy Awards	2009	Outstanding Writing in Animation	Adam Peltzman, Janice Burgess, and McPaul Smith	Nominated	
Daytime Emmy Awards	2010	Outstanding Children's Animated Program	Janice Burgess, Robert Scull, Jonny Belt, Pam Lehn, Scott Dyer, Ellen Martin, Lynne Warner, Susan Ma, Jennifer Hill, and Sara Kamen	Nominated	
Daytime Emmy Awards	2011	Outstanding Children's Animated Program	Janice Burgess, Robert Scull, Jonny Belt, Pam Lehn, Scott Dyer, Ellen Martin, Lynne Warner, Jennifer Hill, and Sara Kamen	Nominated	
Daytime Emmy Awards	2012	Outstanding Writing in Animation	Adam Peltzman, Jeff Borkin, Kerri Grant, Scott Gray, Rodney Stringfellow, and Janice Burgess	Nominated	
Daytime Emmy Awards	2013	Outstanding Music Direction and Composition	Evan Lurie and Doug Wieselman	Nominated	
Daytime Emmy Awards	2014	Outstanding Music Direction and Composition	Evan Lurie and Doug Wieselman	Nominated	
Gemini Awards	2007	Best Pre-School Program or Series	Scott Dyer, Jocelyn Hamilton, Ellen Martin, Doug Murphy, Tracey Dodokin, Jennifer Hill, Janice Burgess, Robert Scull, and Patricia R. Burns	Won	
Gemini Awards	2008	Best Pre-School Program or Series	Scott Dyer, Janice Burgess, Jocelyn Hamilton, Jennifer Hill, Pam Lehn, Ellen Martin, and Doug Murphy	Nominated	

== Related media ==
=== Live events ===
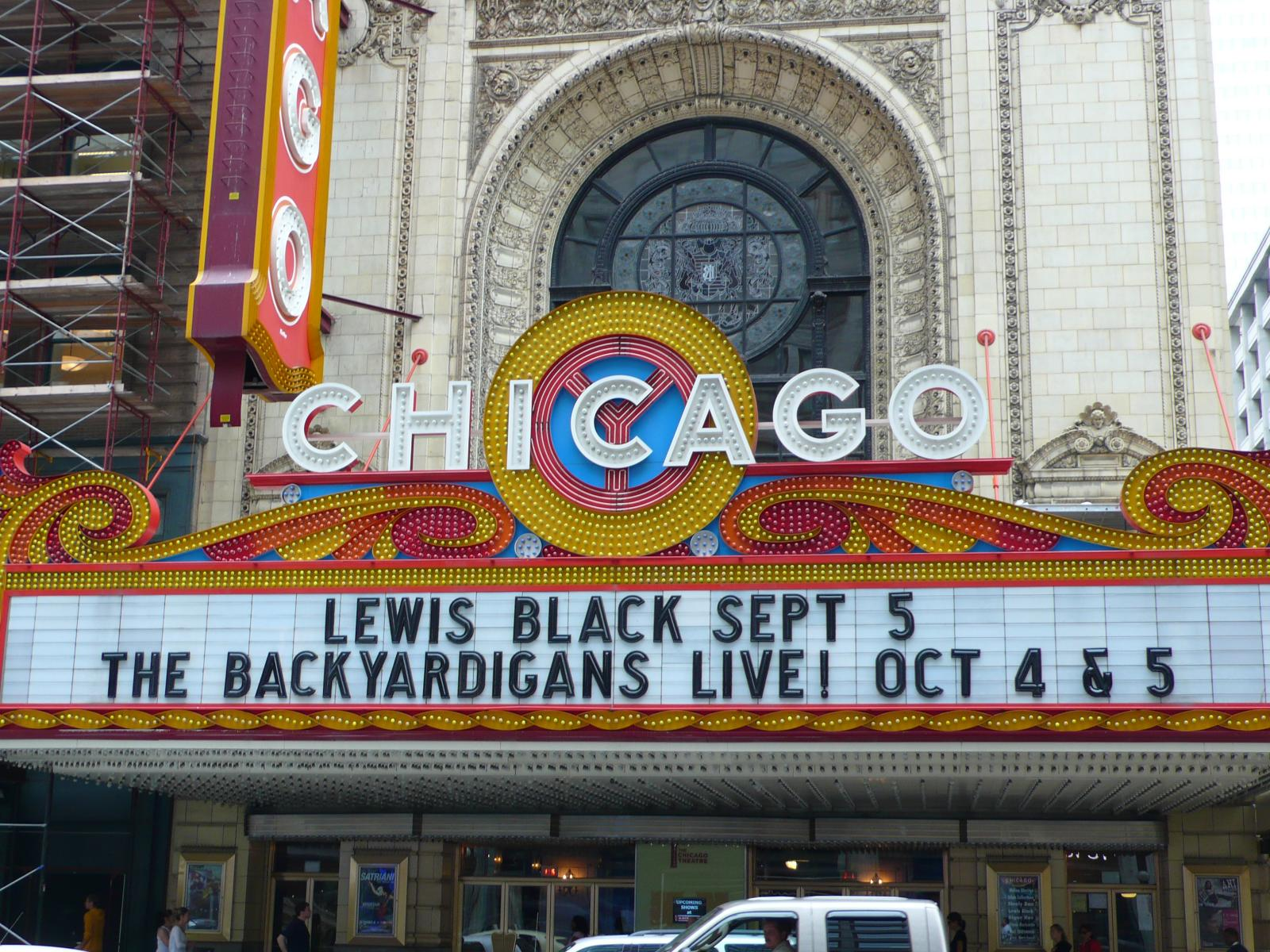
The marquee of the Chicago Theatre advertising a Backyardigans live event in 2008

The Backyardigans was adapted into several stage shows. These included 2008's "Tale of the Mighty Knights" and 2010's "Storytime Live!" (an event featuring other Nick Jr. Channel characters from Dora the Explorer, Wonder Pets!, and Ni Hao, Kai-Lan, as well as hosts Moose and Zee). In Canada, separate live shows called "Quest for the Extra Ordinary Aliens" (2008) and "Sea Deep in Adventure" (2009) were created.

=== Merchandise ===
In June 2005, Nickelodeon & Viacom Consumer Products debuted the show's licensing program at that year's International Licensing Show. Ultimately, the rights were split between it and Nelvana, with the former holding merchandising rights outside of Canada, where they would be held by the latter, which would also hold international program distribution and home video licensing rights outside of the United States.

Activision released a The Backyardigans PC game titled "Mission to Mars," in October 2006. There were also interactive Backyardigans games produced for the LeapPad and VTech V.Smile consoles and a LeapFrog ClickStart game titled "Number Pie Samurai," teaching children necessary computer skills.

From 2005 to 2007, Kohl's had a section devoted to the series' merchandise, including a clothing line and toys exclusively in-store.

Over one hundred storybooks (both original stories and episode-based) were released throughout the series' run. Most of these were released in both Canada and the United States; however, a 2006 series of educational books were exclusively sold in Canada and marketed under the Treehouse TV brand.

Fisher-Price produced numerous plush toys and interactive character toys (mostly Uniqua, Pablo, and Tyrone). There are also Beanie Babies of the main characters available.

=== Distribution ===
Nelvana held distribution and marketing rights to the series worldwide, except for the United States, where those were held by Nickelodeon.

=== Home media ===
==== North America ====
All 80 episodes of the show were released across a series of 21 DVDs. Ten episodes of the first season were also released across a series of five VHS tapes. All releases were distributed by Paramount Home Entertainment on behalf of Nickelodeon in the United States and Nelvana International in Canada.

===== VHS =====
Name	Release date	Number of episodes	Episode titles
It's Great to Be a Ghost!	August 30, 2005	2	"It's Great to Be a Ghost!"; "Monster Detectives"
The Snow Fort	November 8, 2005	2	"The Snow Fort"; "The Yeti"
Polka Palace Party	January 24, 2006	2	"Polka Palace Party"; "High Tea"
Cave Party	March 7, 2006	2	"Cave Party"; "Race Around the World"
Surf's Up!	May 30, 2006	2	"Surf's Up!"; "Riding the Range"

===== DVD =====
Name	Release date	Number of episodes	Episode titles
It's Great to Be a Ghost!	August 30, 2005	4	"It's Great to Be a Ghost!"; "Monster Detectives"; "The Key to the Nile"; "Pirate Treasure"
The Snow Fort	November 8, 2005	4	"The Snow Fort"; "The Yeti"; "Knights Are Brave and Strong"; "Secret Mission"
Polka Palace Party	January 24, 2006	4	"Polka Palace Party"; "High Tea"; "The Heart of the Jungle"; "Viking Voyage"
Cave Party	March 7, 2006	4	"Cave Party"; "Race Around the World"; "Eureka!"; "Castaways"
Surf's Up!	May 30, 2006	4	"Surf's Up!"; "Riding the Range"; "Race to the Tower of Power"; "The Quest for the Flying Rock"
Mission to Mars	October 10, 2006	4	"Mission to Mars"; "Samurai Pie"; "Scared of You"; "Whodunit"
The Legend of the Volcano Sisters	February 6, 2007	4	"The Legend of the Volcano Sisters"; "The Swamp Creature"; "Horsing Around"; "Special Delivery"
Movers & Shakers	May 29, 2007	4	"Movers of Arabia"; "Cops and Robots"; "Sinbad Sails Alone"; "Best Clowns in Town"
Into the Deep	July 31, 2007	4	"Into the Deep"; "Save the Day"; "News Flash!"; "Catch that Butterfly"
Super Secret Super Spy	September 18, 2007	3	"International Super Spy"; "The Secret of Snow"; "A Giant Problem"
Tale of the Mighty Knights	February 26, 2008	3	"Tale of the Mighty Knights"; "Blazing Paddles"; "Garbage Trek"
High Flying Adventures!	May 13, 2008	4	"Fly Girl"; "Who Goes There?"; "What's Bugging You?"; "Chicken-Itza Pizza"
Mighty Match-Up!	July 8, 2008	4	"Match on Mt. Olympus"; "The Great Dolphin Race"; "Ranch Hands from Outer Space"; "Caveman's Best Friend"
Escape from Fairytale Village!	October 7, 2008	4	"Escape from Fairytale Village!"; "Front Page News!"; "Le Master of Disguise"; "Pirate Camp"
Robin Hood the Clean	February 10, 2009	4	"Robin Hood the Clean"; "The Two Musketeers"; "The Masked Retriever"; "To the Center of the Earth"
Singing Sensation!	August 4, 2009	21	Songs: "A Pirate Says Arrr!"; "Save the Day"; "Sinbad the Sailor"; "Ya Gotta Have Pirattitude"; "Viking Song"; "A Message, A Message" (tune: "A-Tisket, A-Tasket"); "On Top of the World"; "We're Knights, That's Right!"; "Not an Egg Anymore" (featuring Adam Pascal); "Everything is Filthy in Flithingham"; "Ready for Anything"; "Bad Bots"; "Can't Stop the Cops" (tune: "Shoo Fly, Don't Bother Me"); "Intergalactic Garbage Trek"; "Front Page News"; "Going to Mars"; "Riding the Range"; "Go, Go, Go"; "The Yeti Stomp"; "International Super Spy"; "The Lady in Pink" (featuring Cyndi Lauper)
Robot Repairman	October 13, 2009	3	"Robot Rampage"; "Catch that Train!"; "Attack of the 50 Foot Worman"
Join the Adventurer's Club	January 5, 2010	4	"Follow the Feather"; "Dragon Express"; "The Funnyman Boogeyman"; "Flower Power"
Escape from the Tower	March 30, 2010	4	"Break Out!"; "Los Galacticos"; "For the Love of Socks!"; "The Tale of the No-So-Nice Dragon"
Operation Elephant Drop	July 13, 2010	4	"Elephant on the Run"; "The Magic Skateboard"; "The Flipper!"; "Super Team Awesome!"
Christmas with the Backyardigans	October 5, 2010	4	"The Action Elves Save Christmas Eve"; "The Big Dipper Diner"; "Pablor and the Acorns"; "The Amazing Splashinis"
We Arrrr Pirates!	March 8, 2011	4	"Pirate Camp"; "Pirate Treasure"; "Sinbad Sails Alone"; "The Tale of the Not-So-Nice Dragon"

===== Episodes on Nick Jr. compilation DVDs =====
Name	Release date	Number of episodes	Episode titles
Nick Jr. Favorites Vol. 2	October 18, 2005	1	"The Quest for the Flying Rock"
Nick Jr. Favorites Vol. 3	February 7, 2006	1	"Race to the Tower of Power"
Nick Jr. Favorites Vol. 4	June 6, 2006	1	"Pirate Treasure"
Nick Jr. Favorites Holiday	September 26, 2006	1	"The Snow Fort"
Nick Jr. Favorites Vol. 5	March 13, 2007	1	"Knights Are Brave and Strong"
Nick Jr. Favorites Vol. 6	August 7, 2007	1	"Monster Detectives"

==== International releases ====
In November 2005, Nelvana International signed a deal with Paramount Home Entertainment to release the series on DVD in the United Kingdom, France, Germany, Spain, Italy, and Latin American and Scandinavian territories.

In March 2008, Nelvana signed a new worldwide DVD distribution agreement with FremantleMedia Enterprises, excluding North America. This deal included all three seasons, allowing the final two seasons to debut outside of North America and the entire series as a whole to debut in Japan on DVD.

Name	Release date	Number of episodes	Episode titles
Polka Palace Party	August 28, 2006	4	"Polka Palace Party"; "High Tea"; "The Heart of the Jungle"; "Viking Voyage"
Cave Party	February 5, 2007	4	"Cave Party"; "Race Around the World"; "Eureka!"; "Castaways"
Surf's Up	July 2, 2007	4	"Surf's Up"; "Riding the Range"; "Race to the Tower of Power"; "The Quest for the Flying Rock"
The Snow Fort	October 15, 2007	4	"The Snow Fort"; "The Yeti"; "Knights Are Brave and Strong"; "Secret Mission"
Mission to Mars	June 16, 2008	5	"Mission to Mars"; "Samurai Pie"; "Scared of You"; "Whodunit"; "The Legend of the Volcano Sisters"
The Secret of Snow	October 27, 2008	15	"The Secret of Snow"; "The Swamp Creature"; "Horsing Around"; "Special Delivery"; "International Super Spy: Part 1"; "International Super Spy: Part 2"; "News Flash"; "Catch that Butterfly"; "A Giant Problem"; "Who Goes There?"; "Blazing Paddles"; "Rubbish Trek"; "Fly Girl"; "What's Bugging You?"; "Chichen-Itza Pizza"
Into the Deep	February 16, 2009	5	"Cops and Robots"; "Sinbad Sails Alone"; "Best Clowns in Town"; "Save the Day"; "Into the Deep"
Tale of the Mighty Knights	April 13, 2009	5	"To the Centre of the Earth"; "Front Page News"; "Tale of the Mighty Knights: Part 1"; "Tale of the Mighty Knights: Part 2"; "Le Master of Disguise"
Movers of Arabia	June 29, 2009	5	"Movers of Arabia"; "Match on Mt. Olympus"; "The Great Dolphin Race"; "Caveman's Best Friend"; "Ranch Hands from Outer Space"
Robin Hood the Clean	August 31, 2009	5	"Robin Hood the Clean"; "Escape from Fairytale Village"; "Pirate Camp"; "The Two Musketeers"; "The Masked Retriever"

==== iTunes releases ====
All four seasons have been released on the iTunes Store in the United States and Canada; however, in the former country, three episodes from the first season are excluded: "Secret Mission," "It's Great to Be a Ghost!," and "High Tea".

=== CD releases ===
There were three The Backyardigans albums released in North America, with one such album also released in Europe, all by Nick Records/Sony BMG Strategic Marketing Group. Each has approximately 20 tracks, while Born to Play has four bonus tracks only available on the iTunes Store.

==== The Backyardigans ====
Released on July 12, 2005. It debuted at #32 on the Billboard 200, selling 46,000 copies in its first week. It contains nineteen tracks from the first season, including the opening theme.

1. "The Backyardigans Theme Song"
2. "You and Me to the Rescue"
3. "Castaways"
4. "Questing, Questing"
5. "A Pirate Says Arr"
6. "Yeti Stomp!"
7. "Queens are Never Wrong"
8. "Those Bones" (tune: "Dem Bones")
9. "Buffalo Girls & Boys" (tune: "Buffalo Gals")
10. "Trudge, Trudge, Trudge"
11. "Secret Agent"
12. "Laser Limbo Tango" (tune: "Limbo Rock")
13. "Row Your Boat" (tune: "Row, Row, Row Your Boat")
14. "Into the Thick of It"
15. "P.U.! (The Stinky Swamp Song)"
16. "Flying Rock Song (II)" (tune: "Hail, Hail, the Gang's All Here")
17. "When I'm Booin'" (tune: "When You're Smiling")
18. "Please and Thank You" (tune: "Shine On, Harvest Moon")
19. "Rockabilly Lullaby (Hush Little Mermaid)"

==== Groove to the Music ====
This second CD was released on July 11, 2006. It contains eighteen tracks from the first two seasons.

1. "Hold Tight"
2. "Gotta Get the Job Done"
3. "Shake Your Body"
4. "Rad Moves"
5. "We're Going to Mars"
6. "Drumming Song"
7. "Eureka!"
8. "The Rules"
9. "Tree to Tree"
10. "What's So Scary 'Bout That?"
11. "The Ballad of the Brave Pink Knight"
12. "I Love Being a Princess"
13. "Aha!"
14. "Skate Ahead"
15. "We'll Get You What You Want"
16. "Ski Patrol to the Rescue"
17. "Super Heroes vs. Super Villains"
18. "Oh, My Sherman" (tune: "Oh My Darling, Clementine")

==== Born to Play ====
The third and final Backyardigans CD was released on January 22, 2008. It contains sixteen tracks from the first two seasons, as well as all the songs from "Tale of the Mighty Knights" from the third season. This album was released in a cardboard foldout case, rather than a jewel case like the previous two releases. Borders carried the jewel case release exclusively, which included a booklet. The album's digital releases featured four additional bonus tracks not included on the CD.

===== Tracks =====
1. "Ready for Anything"
2. "We Love a Luau"
3. "Dancin' the Worman Polka"
4. "I Feel Good"
5. "Go, Go, Go!"
6. "The Customer is Always Right"
7. "Surf's Up, Ho Daddy"
8. "Almost Everything is Boinga" (featuring Alicia Keys)
9. "Nothing Too Tough"
10. "W-I-O-Wa"
11. "I'm a Mountie" (tune: "She'll Be Coming 'Round the Mountain")
12. "Racing Day"
13. "I Never Fail to Deliver the Mail"
14. "Lady in Pink" (featuring Cyndi Lauper)
15. "Nobody's Bigger Than a Giant"
16. "Hurry Home"
17. "I Have a Challenge"
18. "Dragon Mountain"
19. "That Goblin Has Grabbed"
20. "I'm Not an Egg Anymore" (featuring Adam Pascal)
21. "Tweedily-Dee"
22. "We're Knights, That's Right"

===== Digital bonus tracks =====
1. "I Betcha I Can"
2. "Phantom Footsteps"
3. "Do It Myself"
4. "The Call of the Mermaid"

=== Revival series ===
In 2024, The Backyardigans was revived by Nickelodeon as a series of animated music videos on YouTube, this time only starring Uniqua, Tyrone, and Pablo. Notably, these videos are music videos that consist only of remakes of existing songs from the show, and have drawn strong internet criticism.
