= John Burnham Schwartz =

American novelist and screenwriter (born 1965)

- Born: 1965 (age 60–61); New York City, U.S.
- Education: Manhattan Country School; Harvard College (BA)
- Occupations: Novelist; screenwriter
- Parent(s): Alan U. Schwartz; Paula Dunaway
- Website: johnburnhamschwartz.com

John Burnham Schwartz (born 1965) is an American novelist and screenwriter. Schwartz is best known for his novels Reservation Road (1998) and The Commoner (2008). His fifth novel, Northwest Corner, a sequel to Reservation Road, was published in 2011. He is an editor at large at Penguin Random House.

== Career ==
John Burnham Schwartz was born in 1965, in New York City, the son of Alan U. Schwartz, an entertainment attorney, and Paula Schwartz (née Dunaway), an editor and writer. Schwartz's parents later apparently divorced; in 1983 his mother married the poet W. S. Merwin, and was known as Paula Merwin.

Growing up in New York City, Schwartz attended the Manhattan Country School. He later attended Harvard College, where he majored in Japanese studies. After graduating in 1987, with a B.A. in East Asian Studies, he initially accepted a position with a Wall Street investment bank, before finally turning the position down, after selling his first novel. That book, Bicycle Days, a coming of age story about a young American man in Japan, was published in 1989 on his 24th birthday, and garnered strong reviews. In 1991 he was a recipient of a Lyndhurst Foundation Award.

Schwartz's second novel Reservation Road (1998), about a family tragedy and its aftermath, was critically acclaimed, and in 2007 was made into a major motion picture. The film, starring Joaquin Phoenix, Mark Ruffalo, and Jennifer Connelly, was directed by Terry George, based on a screenplay that was co-written by Schwartz and George.

Schwartz went on to publish Claire Marvel (2002), a love story set in the United States and France, and, in 2008, The Commoner, a novel inspired by the life of Empress Michiko of Japan, the current empress and crown princess of Japan, and the first commoner to marry into the Japanese imperial family.

He was a co-writer, with Sam Levinson and Samuel Baum, of the screenplay for The Wizard of Lies, a 2017 HBO movie about the disgraced financier Bernie Madoff, based on the non-fiction book of the same title by Diana B. Henriques; the screenplay was a 2018 nominee for a Writers Guild of America Award, for an adapted long-form program.

Schwartz has contributed articles to publications including The New Yorker, The New York Times Book Review, The Boston Globe, and Vogue. He has taught at Harvard, the University of Iowa Writers' Workshop, and Sarah Lawrence College. He is the Literary Director of the Sun Valley Writers' Conference, based in Ketchum, Idaho.

He lives in Brooklyn, New York, with his wife, screenwriter and food writer Aleksandra Crapanzano, and their son Garrick.

== Novels ==
- Bicycle Days (1989)
- Reservation Road (1998)
- Claire Marvel (2002)
- The Commoner (2008)
- Northwest Corner (2011)
- The Red Daughter (2019)

== Filmography ==
- The Wizard of Lies (2017) – co-screenwriter, with Sam Levinson and Samuel Baum
