= Winx Club season 1 =

Winx Club
- Season 1
- Italian DVD cover (left) and artwork for the 2011 specials (right)
- No. of episodes: 26

Release
- Original network: Rai Due; Nickelodeon (2011 specials)
- Original release: 28 January – 26 March 2004

Season chronology
- Next → Season 2

The first season of the animated series Winx Club aired in Italy from 28 January to 26 March 2004, consisting of 26 episodes. The series was created by Iginio Straffi, who also acted as its executive producer and director of the season.

The season revolves around Bloom, a 16-year-old girl from Earth who discovers she has magical abilities, as she enrolls in the Alfea High School for Fairies. Along with her newfound best friend Stella, a 17-year-old, Bloom meets her new apartment roommates Flora, Musa and Tecna, and together, they form the Winx Club. During their adventures, they become good friends and get to know some of the boys from another school called Red Fountain, but also encounter some adversaries, including a trio of young witches called the Trix.

In February 2011, Nickelodeon's parent company Viacom became a co-owner of the Rainbow studio. Rainbow and Nickelodeon Animation Studio produced a Winx Club revival series, which began with four television specials that retell the first two seasons of the original show. The first three specials summarized the plot of the first season with new animation, and they aired on June 27, August 1, and September 18, 2011.

== Production ==
Comic artist Iginio Straffi conceived the idea for Winx Club in the mid-1990s, when he noticed that action cartoons were usually focused on male heroes. By 2001, he had developed a short pilot episode for the series, then titled Magic Bloom. This animation included many concepts that would eventually appear in the series, such as the five original Winx members and the Trix, but the characters were younger and their outfits were not modelled after fashion trends. The pilot garnered the support of Italy's public broadcasting company, RAI, but Straffi was unsatisfied with the final product. He made the decision to scrap the animation and heavily rework the concept, despite a financial investment of over €100,000 in the completed pilot.

Production on the retooled series was underway by 2002, and Rainbow estimated that the episodes would be delivered to distributors by Autumn 2003. At the October 2003 MIPCOM event, Rainbow screened the show's first episode to international companies. Later that month, the American network Fox announced that it had picked up the show's first season of twenty-six episodes. The first season eventually made its world premiere on Rai Due on 28 January 2004.

== Episodes ==
No. overall	No. in season	Italian title / Cinélume English title 4Kids English title	Italian air date	American air date
1	1	"Una fata a Gardenia" / "An Unexpected Event" "It Feels Like Magic"	28 January 2004	19 June 2004
Bloom, an ordinary 16-year-old high school girl living on Earth, encounters a battle between a 17-year-old fairy named Stella and an ogre named Knut. As Stella's magic scepter is stolen, Bloom intervenes, discovering that she has magical powers and manages to turn the tide. Stella invites Bloom to attend Alfea, a boarding school for fairies, to fully master her new powers. Knut returns with more ghouls and a troll, launching a surprise attack at Bloom's home. Stella and Bloom call in the Specialists, Sky, Brandon, Timmy, and Riven: a group of boys from Magix at Red Fountain, a school for Specialists, who capture the troll and defeat Knut. The next morning, Bloom has agreed to go to Alfea.
2	2	"Benvenuti a Magix!" / "Welcome to Magix!" "More Than High School"	30 January 2004	26 June 2004
Bloom arrives at Alfea, under the name Princess Varanda of Callisto, a student who had declined her admission. She is introduced to her new roommates, Flora, Tecna, and Musa. The girls then go for a day out in Magix City. While calling her parents, she spots Knut spying on her friends, and follows him. She learns that Knut is working for the Trix: three witches from the school of Cloud Tower named Icy, Darcy, and Stormy. After pitifully trying to defend herself, Bloom is captured by the Trix, but the other girls rescue her. When the girls are caught sneaking back into school, Bloom confesses her real name to Headmistress Faragonda and discipline head Griselda, but Faragonda forgives her transgression and lets her attend the school. The girls agree on Bloom's name for their group: The Winx Club.
3	3	"L'anello di Stella" / "Alfea College for Fairies" "Save the First Dance"	2 February 2004	3 July 2004
Alfea and the neighboring boys school, Red Fountain, prepare for a ball to begin the school year. However, Headmistress Griffin of Cloudtower plans to spoil the ball as revenge for being excluded. She picks The Trix's suggestion of replacing the magic egg gifts with snake-rat eggs. While Bloom prepares her dress for the ball, she spots the Trix casting a spell on the eggs, so she tells her friends, and they reverse the spell in time for the ball. Later Bloom spots the Trix trying to steal Stella's ring, and tries to fight them off, transforming into a fairy for the first time. Although the Trix are able to escape, the other Winx girls inform Bloom that Stella's ring is safe and that they swapped the contents of the case with a baby duck (Pepe) that bonds with Icy.
4	4	"La palude di Melmamora" / "The Black-Mud Swamp" "The Voice of Nature"	4 February 2004	10 July 2004
As part of Professor Palladium's field trip, the class must navigate the Black-Mud Swamp to reach a clearing in the Gloomy-Wood Forest by listening to nature and without using any magic. The boys from Red Fountain are transporting a troll prisoner but the Trix cause their aircraft to crash land, and the troll is freed. The Winx and the Red Fountain boys end up meeting in the swamp, and must work together, despite their differences, to find their way out. They encounter the troll who is harassing some other Alfea fairies, and chase him off, however, the Trix find the troll and send him away. Although the Red Fountain boys failed to deliver the troll, they remark they are starting to feel like a team. The Winx girls, although they finished last in their assignment, are commended by their teachers for their helping others.
5	5	"Appuntamento al buio" / "Date with Disaster" "Date with Disaster"	6 February 2004	17 July 2004
While the Winx are on kitchen duty, Stella is invited on a date with Prince Sky (Brandon) at the brand-new Black Lagoon restaurant and also asks for help on picking out an outfit. While selecting her attire, Stella decides not to wear the ring of Solaria and gives it to Bloom for safekeeping (believing she will not need her magic powers). The next morning, Stella starts acting completely different, becoming irritable and refusing to say anything about last night. During classes, Bloom notices that Stella is absent and goes back to their dorm to check, only to find Stella has torn the room apart. An enraged Stella begins asking Bloom where her ring is, and eventually blasts her when she doesn't say. Stella then suddenly vanishes, leaving the other four to find Prince Sky at Red Fountain for information. To their shock, Sky says he worked out all night and he never wrote the invitation. The Winx then decide to find the Black Lagoon, only it doesn't show up on Tecna's map, and no one in the city seems to know where it is. Just as Musa is ready to quit, a strange man gives them the exact location. The girls find a beautiful restaurant on the edge of town, though Flora finds it strange how the gorgeous tree feels dead. She quickly reveals that an illusion has been cast, revealing a run-down shack. The Winx venture inside and find Stella who begins attacking them. The girls transform, and quickly learn that the entire date was a plot by the Trix. They sent the fake invitation and kidnapped her to get her ring of Solaria. However, when she didn't wear it, they sent Darcy disguised as Stella back to Alfea to find it. The Trix also reveal the real Stella trapped in magic energy rings and force Bloom into an ultimatum; hand over the ring or Icy will kill Stella. In the end, Bloom decides Stella is more important, transforms out of fairy form and gives them the ring, while also beginning her role as the unofficial leader.
6	6	"Missione a Torrenuvola" / "Mission at Cloudtower" "Secret Guardian"	9 February 2004	24 July 2004
After returning to Alfea, Bloom researches the Ring of Solaria, hoping to find out what made the Trix go to such lengths to get it. Meanwhile, the Trix use a spell on the ring, hoping to access an extremely powerful magic known as the Dragon Flame, only to have their spell blow up in their faces as the ring proves negative. An infuriated Icy throws the ring away and plans to begin the search all over again. Back at Alfea, Bloom learns more on the ring of Solaria, but also learns about the Dragon Flame. Bloom then turns to Miss Faragonda for answers, who tells her that the Dragon Flame was the energy of the Great Dragon, who created the magical universe and later rested on the planet Domino. That night, the Winx plan to infiltrate Cloud Tower to retrieve Stella's ring (since she can't transform without it). Using the same secret tunnel the Trix used earlier, the girls sneak into Cloudtower without a hitch while the Trix are out. After searching their room, Stella finds her ring, but the tunnel doesn't reopen and the Winx are forced to find the main exit without getting caught. While exploring, the Winx stumble upon Cloudtower's archive which contains history on every person in the Magic dimension. A curious Bloom spots a book with her name on it and tries to read more on her past, but quickly regrets it when it turns into a trap that alerts Headmistress Griffin! The Winx try to make a hasty escape, but Griffin sends Bako monsters to scare them out. After using their magic to fight the monsters, the Winx are led to a dead end. In a panic to destroy the last monster, Stella accidentally sets the room on fire. As the Winx begin to suffocate, a mysterious voice guides Bloom to an exit, allowing them to leave Cloudtower. Though the ring was recovered, the Winx are busted since Griffin already called Faragonda hours ago. As punishment, Faragonda temporarily extracts all their powers.
7	7	"A che servono gli amici?" / "Friends in Need" "Grounded"	11 February 2004	31 July 2004
The Winx have lost all their powers as punishment for sneaking into Cloud Tower, but to make matters worse, Griselda tasks them with cleaning the entire school without their magic (or technology, much to Tecna's dismay) while the rest of the students and faculty go to a concert. Problems continue as Bloom, Stella and Musa have a water fight, wasting their time, energy and supplies, while Tecna struggles with no gadgets to help her, causing her to wear a bucket on her head and attempt to use a broom. In order to make the punishment lighter, the girls secretly invite the boys from Red Fountain over after everyone has left, claiming to be throwing an all-night party. Meanwhile, the Trix use the opportunity to sneak into a near-empty Alfea to find the real source of the Dragon Flame. The Specialists arrive and instead learn they will be working as janitors, though they still play music as they work. Soon after, the Trix teleport to Alfea and summon the vacuums to guide them towards the Dragon Flame, while distracting the gang by summoning a monster. The Winx and Specialists quickly meet their distraction, and while the boys try to fight with their weapons, they're quickly knocked aside. The Winx, despite having no magic, manage to outsmart the beast by using floor cleaner. Unable to find the Dragon Flame, the Trix depart to Cloudtower, unseen by anyone while the Specialists head back to Redfountain. The next morning, Faragonda sees the damage and hears the story from the Winx and as a reward for defeating an adversary using only wits and resourcefulness, the Winx's powers are returned to them.
8	8	"La festa della rosa" / "A Friendship Sundered" "The Day of the Rose"	13 February 2004	7 August 2004
During the Rose Festival, both Bloom and Riven unwittingly fall into a trap by the Trix to divide the close relationship between the Specialists and the Winx. In the end, Riven thinks that Darcy has saved him in a racing crash and he blames Bloom for what happened then gets upset at his friends for believing Bloom over him and transfers out of the squad of Specialists along with Darcy.
9	9	"Il tradimento di Riven" / "Betrayed!" "Spelled"	16 February 2004	14 August 2004
There are hostilities between the Winx due to Stella's behavior, and Musa's feelings for Riven are strained. In a fight with the Trix, the possessor of the Dragon's Flame is revealed to be Bloom.
10	10	"La Fiamma del Drago" / "Bloom Tested" "Magical Reality Check"	18 February 2004	21 August 2004
It is time for Bloom's magical midterm test in a virtual reality machine. The Trix mess with the computer so they can enter it and test her to be sure that Bloom is indeed the one who possesses the Dragon Flame.
11	11	"Il regno delle ninfee" / "The Monster and The Willow" "Junior League"	20 February 2004	28 August 2004
Flora experiments with her plants to study for her test. Stella (who had her clothes torn apart by a plant) and Tecna (who was attacked by a plant) tell Flora to move the plants. She moves them to Black-Mud Swamp. Flora seeks help from the Water Nymphs in finding a special plant. The Water Nymphs tell the Winx about a monster which has been terrorizing them and the Winx decide to fight it.
12	12	"Miss Magix"	23 February 2004	4 September 2004
On the day before a big test, Stella enters a beauty pageant. Lucy from Cloud Tower does too, with help from the Trix, who want to play a mean prank on Lucy by first making her pretty, sabotaging the performances of the other contestants, and then breaking the spell in front of everyone once she has earned the Miss Magix prize. In the end, Stella wins and kept her promise to Bloom, which was to study all night for the test the next morning. Although Stella makes a few mistakes but because she studied after the pageant, she passes.
13	13	"La figlia del fuoco" / "A Great Secret Revealed" "Meant to Be"	25 February 2004	11 September 2004
Bloom returns to Gardenia during spring break. She discovers she can read people's auras, and she casts her doubts on a pending business deal regarding her mom's flower shop. A vision was unlocked while putting out a fire in her mom's flower shop. She also discovers that Mike found her as a baby while tackling a fire, meaning Bloom's not Mike and Vanessa's biological daughter.
14	14	"Il segreto di Bloom" / "Bloom's Dark Secret" "Witch Trap"	27 February 2004	18 September 2004
Bloom's curiosity about her past and magical powers begin to interfere with her confidence and she arranges to go to Cloud Tower with Brandon to seek answers. Bloom meets a kind witch named Mirta.
15	15	"Voci dal passato" / "Honor Above All" "Pushing the Envelope"	1 March 2004	25 September 2004
A pending test by Professor Wizgiz worries the Winx Club. Bloom accidentally finds the answers to the test.
16	16	"Il nemico nell'ombra" / "Cold Spell" "The Nightmare Monster"	3 March 2004	2 October 2004
In another attempt to harness the power of the Dragon's Flame, the Trix send a nightmare monster to terrorise the dreams of the Winx.
17	17	"Il segreto di Brandon" / "Secrets Within Secrets" "Royal Heartbreak"	5 March 2004	9 October 2004
During festivities at Red Fountain, Bloom encounters Princess Diaspro, who claims she is betrothed to Brandon, whom she keeps calling Sky. Bloom finds out that Sky and Brandon switched identities, because "Sky" wanted to live a normal life for once.
18	18	"Addio Magix" / "The Font of Dragon Fire" "Senior Witches Go to Earth"	8 March 2004	16 October 2004
Upset about the events at Red Fountain, Bloom returns to Earth. The Trix take advantage of the situation and attack her on Earth. The witches reveal to Bloom that she is the surviving heir to planet Domino, and they steal the Dragon Fire from her.
19	19	"Attacco ad Alfea" / "The Fall of Magix" "The Army of Decay"	10 March 2004	23 October 2004
Bloom returns to Alfea following the events on Earth. The Trix take control of Cloud Tower and summon the Army of Decay to take control of Magix.
20	20	"La scomparsa di Bloom" / "Mission to Domino" "Sparks of Hope"	12 March 2004	30 October 2004
To counter the powerful magic possessed by the Trix, the Winx Club go to planet Domino hoping to find the Dragon Flame. Red Fountain is attacked by the Army of Decay.
21	21	"Trappola di ghiaccio" / "The Crown of Dreams" "The Frozen Palace"	15 March 2004	6 November 2004
In the ruins of Domino, the girls are attacked during their exploration. In Magix, Red Fountain is destroyed by the Trix.
22	22	"Il ritorno di Riven" / "Storming Cloudtower" "Mission to Cloud Tower"	17 March 2004	13 November 2004
The Army of Decay forces the retreat of the population to Alfea. The Winx go to Cloud Tower in attempt to retrieve the power of the Dragon's Flame from the Trix. Riven rejoins the Specialists.
23	23	"Fuga da Torrenuvola" / "Power Play" "The Search for the Flame"	19 March 2004	20 November 2004
The Trix torment the Winx for being unable to find the power of the Dragon's Flame on Domino. The cadre and staff of Cloud Tower escape to Alfea.
24	24	"Il mistero del lago" / "The Witches' Siege" "Battle for Alfea"	22 March 2004	27 November 2004
The Army of Darkness launches an attack on Alfea. Bloom is guided to Lake Fortress of Light/Roccaluce by a mysterious voice.
25	25	"Il sonno di Magix" / "The Ultimate Challenge" "The Great Witch Invasion"	24 March 2004	4 December 2004
The first attack on Alfea fails. Bloom follows the spirit of her ghostly big sister Daphne and regains her Dragon Fire powers. The Trix lead the Army of Decay in a final attack on Alfea.
26	26	"Battaglia finale" / "The Witches' Downfall" "Fire and Ice"	26 March 2004	11 December 2004
As the Army of Darkness approaching Alfea and the Trix seeking to take complete control of the Magix Dimension, the Winx, except Bloom and including Alfea's students and teachers take action to fend off the Trix from completely destroying Alfea before the Trix use the powers of the Dragon.

== Home media ==
List of Winx Club DVD releases
Release name	No. of episodes	Company	Release date	Notes
Vol. 1 Welcome To Magix!	5	Funimation	12 July 2005	4Kids dub of season 1 episodes 1–5
Vol. 2 The Power Of Dragon Fire	6	Funimation	15 November 2005	4Kids dub of season 1 episodes 6–11
Vol. 3 Bloom's Secret Past	5	Funimation	17 January 2006	4Kids dub of season 1 episodes 12–16
Vol. 4 Stolen Dragon Fire	5	Funimation	23 May 2006	4Kids dub of season 1 episodes 17–21
Vol. 5 Battle For Alfea	5	Funimation	29 August 2006	4Kids dub of season 1 episodes 22–26
The Original Complete Season 1	26	Cinedigm	25 March 2014	Cinélume dub of season 1 episodes 1–26
Realm of Magix: The Original Season 1, Vol. 1	13	Cinedigm	25 March 2014	Cinélume dub of season 1 episodes 1–13
Defeating the Trix: The Original Season 1, Vol. 2	13	Cinedigm	25 March 2014	Cinélume dub of season 1 episodes 14–26
