= Winx Club season 2 =

Winx Club
- Season 2
- Italian DVD cover (left) and artwork for the 2011 special (right)
- No. of episodes: 26

Release
- Original network: Rai Due; Nickelodeon (2011 special)
- Original release: 19 April – 14 July 2005

Season chronology
- ← Previous; Season 1 Next → Season 3

The second season of the animated series Winx Club aired in Italy from 19 April to 14 July 2005, consisting of 26 episodes. The series was created by Iginio Straffi, who also acted as executive producer and director of the season.

The season follows the Winx Club's second year at the Alfea College for Fairies, where they strive to earn an enhancement to their powers called Charmix. A new member of the Winx Club (Aisha, (Note: Aisha is renamed Layla in several dubs.) the Fairy of Waves) is introduced in the season's first episode. Meanwhile, the Trix are freed from their prison by Darkar, who becomes their leader.

In February 2011, Viacom (owner of Nickelodeon) became a co-owner of the Rainbow studio. Rainbow and Nickelodeon Animation Studio produced a Winx Club revival series, which began with four television specials that retell the first two seasons of the original show. The fourth special, "The Shadow Phoenix," retold the plot of the second season and premiered on October 16, 2011.

== Production ==
On 21 April 2004, Winx Club production company Rainbow S.r.l. announced that work on a second season of the series was in progress. The season's debut on 19 April 2005 coincided with new merchandise lines. A spin-off series based on the chibi-inspired Pixie characters from the second season was launched in 2010, following a licensing program in 2006.

== Episodes ==
| No. overall | No. in season | Italian title / Cinélume English title 4Kids English title | Italian air date | American air date |
|---|---|---|---|---|
| 27 | 1 | "La fenice d'ombra" / "The Shadow Phoenix" "Back to School" | 19 April 2005 | September 10, 2005 |
The Winx Club return for their second year at Alfea and encounter an exhausted Fairy of Waves named Aisha and her sleepy baby pixie, Piff. Bloom finds the Secret Archive - which contains Alfea's piece of the Codex.
| 28 | 2 | "Il ritorno delle Trix" / "Up to Their Old Trix" "Princess of Tides" | 21 April 2005 | September 17, 2005 |
The new fairy introduces herself as Aisha and requests the help of the Winx to rescue her kidnapped pixie friends. Lord Darkar breaks the Trix out of their prison and gives them Gloomix.
| 29 | 3 | "Missione di salvataggio" / "Rescue Mission" "Into the Under Realm" | 26 April 2005 | September 24, 2005 |
In conjunction with the Specialists, Bloom, Stella and Aisha travel to the Underrealm in an attempt to rescue the pixies. Along the way, they have to battle shadow monsters and tolerate a temporary loss of power.
| 30 | 4 | "La Principessa Amentia" / "Princess Amentia" "Queen of Perfection" | 28 April 2005 | October 1, 2005 |
Stella and Brandon, after getting separated from the group in the previous episode, encounter a subterranean civilisation whose royalty banishes Stella and forces Brandon into an arranged marriage with Princess Amentia. Stella, after returning to the surface to regenerate her powers, rescues her friends.
| 31 | 5 | "Magico Bonding" / "Magic Bonding" "Rescuing the Pixies" | 3 May 2005 | October 8, 2005 |
After Darkar causes a cave-in in the previous episode, Bloom, Sky, Aisha and Stella have to find another way to get to Lord Darkar's fortress. When they finally manage to get back into the caves after using Sky's magic gadget, Aisha goes to the fortress to rescue the pixies while Bloom, Stella and Sky are forced to battle the Trix.
| 32 | 6 | "Il matrimonio di Brandon" / "Runaway Groom" "My Boyfriend's Wedding" | 5 May 2005 | October 15, 2005 |
During the ascent to leave Lord Darkar's fortress, Bloom, Sky, Stella, Aisha and the pixies travel to Downland to prevent Princess Amentia from marrying Brandon. In the end, Amentia reconsiders her actions, then Stella embraces Brandon.
| 33 | 7 | "La pietra misteriosa" / "The Mysterious Stone" "The Dark Tower" | 10 May 2005 | October 22, 2005 |
Shortly after the Winx Club and Specialists return from the Underrealm, a monolith appears and the girls are sent to destroy it, but are unable to when it drains them of their magic.
| 34 | 8 | "Il guastafeste" / "Party Crasher" "Party Monster" | 12 May 2005 | October 29, 2005 |
The Winx Club arrives at Red Fountain for ground breaking festivities. The Trix infiltrate the party disguised as fairies and unleash a monster to disrupt the activities so they can attempt to obtain the Codex. Flora meets a new student named Helia at Red Fountain.
| 35 | 9 | "Il segreto del Professor Avalon" / "Professor Avalon's Secret" "The Angel of Doom" | 17 May 2005 | November 5, 2005 |
Tecna and Digit become suspicious of Professor Avalon's strange actions and constant interaction with Bloom. They assume that he is a creature that disguises itself as a paladin in order to earn people's trust before revealing its true nature and destroying everything.
| 36 | 10 | "La cripta del codice" / "The Crypt of the Codex" "Reaching for the Sky" | 19 May 2005 | November 12, 2005 |
The Trix launch an attack on the new Red Fountain to capture a piece of the Codex. Meanwhile, Bloom, Flora and Tecna go to Red Fountain to try sort out the troubles between them and the Specialists.
| 37 | 11 | "Corsa contro il tempo" / "Race Against Time" "Homesick" | 24 May 2005 | November 19, 2005 |
Determined to find the location of Pixie Village to steal the fourth piece of the Codex, Lord Darkar puts a homesickness spell on the pixies that compels them to return to their Pixie Village.
| 38 | 12 | "Unite per la vittoria" / "Winx Together!" "Truth or Dare" | 26 May 2005 | November 26, 2005 |
Under a spell, a Specialist named Jared corrupts the simulation chamber. Doing Darkar's dirty work, Darcy sabotages the Winx during the simulator test. Meanwhile, the Winx Club have to learn about convergence spells.
| 39 | 13 | "La dama del ballo" / "The Invisible Pixies" "Gangs of Gardenia" | 31 May 2005 | December 3, 2005 |
Bloom, Stella, Musa and Aisha go to Earth for a break from studies. Musa and Aisha attract the attention of a local gang in a nightclub, when Musa changes the music in a club using magic.
| 40 | 14 | "Battaglia sul pianeta Eraklyon" / "Battle on Planet Eraklyon" "The Wrong Righters" | 2 June 2005 | January 28, 2006 |
Sky, Bloom, Brandon, and Flora go to Sky's home Eraklyon where they find his former girlfriend, Princess Diaspro, has been kidnapped by yosinote who wants to rule Eraklyon, and demands a ransom. Meanwhile at Alfea, Musa and Stormy have a fight. Musa manages to win and Stormy swears revenge.
| 41 | 15 | "Lo spettacolo continua" / "The Show Must Go On!" "Magic in My Heart" | 7 June 2005 | February 4, 2006 |
Musa is set to perform at Red Fountain, but her dad opposes her interest in music and wants to transfer her to another school. Stormy strikes again, attacking Musa's dad to get revenge on the fairy. In the end, Musa remains at Alfea.
| 42 | 16 | "HalloWinx!" "The Fourth Witch" | 9 June 2005 | February 11, 2006 (After episode 44) |
Jolly does a card reading that foretells danger to people going on a journey and feels that it will come true when the Winx girls are invited by Mitzi to her Halloween party in a haunted mansion.
| 43 | 17 | "Gemellaggio con le Streghe" / "Twinning with the Witches" "Exchange Students" | 14 June 2005 | February 4, 2006 (After episode 41) |
The Winx go to Cloud Tower with Mirta, as exchange students, to protect the second piece of the Codex. The Trix infiltrate Cloud Tower and cause frequent mayhem to distract the girls from getting the Codex first.
| 44 | 18 | "Nel Cuore di Torrenuvola" / "In the Heart of Cloud Tower" "The Heart of Cloud Tower" | 16 June 2005 | February 11, 2006 (Before episode 42) |
The Trix continue to attack Cloud Tower in order to obtain the second piece of the Codex and the Winx's constant bickering prevents them from stopping the Trix.
| 45 | 19 | "La spia nell'ombra" / "The Spy in the Shadows" "Shadows in Bloom" | 21 June 2005 | February 18, 2006 |
After Bloom is put under a therapeutic spell cast by Professor Avalon to learn more about her real parents, she is controlled by an evil force, turning into her alter-ego Dark Bloom, to steal the third piece of the Codex from Alfea.
| 46 | 20 | "Il villaggio delle Pixies" / "Pixie Village" "The First Charmix" | 23 June 2005 | February 18, 2006 |
The Winx are sent with the Specialists on a team-building vacation to the Wildlands. While on a ski lift to the top of a mountain, the lift breaks down and Bloom encourages them to work together to save themselves, earning her Charmix. Meanwhile, Icy is sent by Darkar to obtain the fourth and final piece of the Codex at Pixie Village. Professor Avalon is poisoned by a flower and Palladium needs a special ingredient from Pixie Village to cure him.
| 47 | 21 | "Il potere del Charmix" / "Charmix Power" "Trouble in Paradise" | 28 June 2005 | February 25, 2006 |
The Trix are sent by Darkar to the Wildlands to capture Bloom, as her Dragon Flame is a key part in opening the Realm of Relix to obtain the Ultimate Power. The Trix put the wild animals under their influence to capture Bloom. Stella gives up her beach fashion show to help Aisha, and Musa & Riven discover the Trix are there, and the former makes the choice to trust the latter, earning both Stella and Musa their Charmix.
| 48 | 22 | "Wildland: La grande trappola" / "Danger in the Wildland" "Last Resorts" | 30 June 2005 | February 25, 2006 |
Timmy devises a plan to prevent the Trix from kidnapping Bloom. Meanwhile, Aisha faces her fears of being alone and Tecna reconciles with Timmy. Both earn their Charmix and the pixies are exposed to strange pollen which makes them really sick.
| 49 | 23 | "Il momento della verità" / "The Time for Truth" "Darkness and Light" | 5 July 2005 | March 4, 2006 |
The real Professor Avalon escapes from Lord Darkar's fortress. The pixies are taken to Pixie Village to cure them. However, the Flower of Life which can heal them is sick and Flora remains there to heal it while the rest of the Winx begin their Charmix training, but Bloom is captured and brought to Darkar's fortress by what turns out to be a servant of his posing as Professor Avalon. Flora confesses her love to Helia and earns her Charmix. Helia confesses that he loves her too.
| 50 | 24 | "Prigioniera di Darkar" / "Darkar's Prisoner" "Desperately Seeking Bloom" | 7 July 2005 | March 4, 2006 |
The Winx, the Pixies, and the Specialists head to the Underrealm to rescue Bloom. Meanwhile, Sky, Brandon and Aisha request Princess Amentia's assistance in the battle with Darkar. In the end, Bloom falls under one of Lord Darkar's dark spells and transforms into Dark Bloom; this time for real.
| 51 | 25 | "Faccia a faccia con il nemico" / "Face to Face with the Enemy" "Storming Shadowhaunt" | 12 July 2005 | March 11, 2006 |
The Winx and Specialists enter the Underrealm and proceed to Darkar's fortress, having to face several obstacles along the way. Meanwhile, the Trix's Gloomix is burned out when they give their powers to the shadow monsters in order for them to destroy the Winx and Specialists. Darkar sees them as useless and banishes them, seeing more use for Dark Bloom than the witches.
| 52 | 26 | "Le ceneri della Fenice" / "The Phoenix Revealed" "The Ultimate Power Couple" | 14 July 2005 | March 11, 2006 |
Lord Darkar and Dark Bloom enter the Realm of Relix and begin preparations for obtaining the Ultimate Power. The Winx, aided by the Specialists, Ms. Faragonda, Ms. Griffin and Codatorta pass many obstacles in order to enter the Realm of Relix and destroy Lord Darkar. Sky confesses his love for Bloom, which triggers Bloom to transform back into her normal self. Through the final battle against Darkar, the Winx combined their Charmix together to defeat him once and for all. After defeating Darkar, the Trix are left behind in the crumbling Realm of Relix.

== Home media ==
List of Winx Club DVD releases
| Release name | No. of episodes | Company | Release date | Notes |
|---|---|---|---|---|
| Season 2, Vol. 1: Layla & the Pixies | 12 | Funimation | 13 February 2007 | 4kids dub of season 2 episodes 1–12 |
| Season 2, Vol. 2: Battle for the Codex | 14 | Funimation | 18 September 2007 | 4kids dub of season 2 episodes 13–26 |
| The Original Complete Season 2 | 26 | Cinedigm | 11 November 2014 | Cinélume dub of season 2 episodes 1–26 |
| The Shadow Phoenix: The Original Season 2, Vol. 1 | 13 | Cinedigm | 11 November 2014 | Cinélume dub of season 2 episodes 1–13 |
