= List of Winx Club episodes =

DVD cover artwork showing Musa (left), Stella (center), and Bloom (right)

Winx Club is an Italian-American (Note: In 2011, the American company Viacom became a co-owner of the Rainbow studio. Afterward, new seasons of Winx Club were co-developed between Viacom's Nickelodeon Animation Studio in the U.S. and Rainbow in Italy.) animated series co-produced by Rainbow SpA and Nickelodeon, which were both part of Viacom (Paramount) at the time. The show was created by Iginio Straffi.

Winx Club follows a group of fairy warriors called the Winx as they enroll in Alfea College and learn to fight mythical villains.

From the beginning of the show's development, Iginio Straffi planned an overarching plot that would conclude after three seasons. A feature-length film followed the third season, intended to wrap up the series' plot as the fairies graduate from Alfea College. In 2008, Straffi made the decision to extend the original series with a fourth season, citing its increasing popularity. During the production of the fourth season, the American company Viacom (owner of Nickelodeon) engaged in a "long courtship" with the Rainbow studio. Viacom became a co-owner of Rainbow to produce their own episodes of Winx Club.

In 2010, Viacom announced that "Nickelodeon is teaming up with the original creator to present an all-new Winx Club." Viacom's Nickelodeon Animation Studio started production on a revived series, in which the Winx are once again students at Alfea, as they were before their graduation in the original show. The Nickelodeon revival began with four television specials that summarize the first two seasons of the original series. After the specials, Viacom's brand-new fifth, sixth, and seventh seasons were broadcast on Nickelodeon networks worldwide ahead of the Italian broadcasts. (Note: The specials and seasons 5-7 were co-developed with Nickelodeon and premiered on Nickelodeon networks ahead of the Italian broadcasts. Season 5 premiered on Nick U.S. on 26 August 2012, season 6 premiered on Nick U.S. on 29 September 2013, and season 7 premiered on Nick Asia on 22 June 2015.)

Winx Club uses a serial format, with each episode contributing to the overall storyline. Episodes are written with two stories in mind: the longer narrative arc that lasts for tens of episodes and a subplot which concludes at the end of the 22-minute runtime. This episode structure was modeled on those of teen dramas and American comics.

== Overview ==
Season	Episodes	Originally released	
Season	Episodes	First released	Last released
Original series
1	26	28 January 2004	26 March 2004
2	26	19 April 2005	14 July 2005
3	26	29 January 2007	28 March 2007
4	26	15 April 2009	13 November 2009
Revived series
Specials	4	21 November 2011	12 December 2011
5	26	16 October 2012	24 April 2013
6	26	6 January 2014	4 August 2014
7	26	21 September 2015	3 October 2015
8	26	15 April 2019	17 September 2019

== Original series ==
When Iginio Straffi began developing Winx Club at the Rainbow studio, he outlined the plot to last three seasons (78 episodes). In 2007, Straffi explained that "the Winx saga was planned in detail from the beginning. And it will not last forever." The third season follows the fairies' last year at Alfea College, during which they earn their final fairy form, Enchantix. In 2008, Iginio Straffi chose to continue the story for a fourth season. During the fourth season's development, Viacom began discussions to become a co-owner of the Rainbow studio and produce a revival series, which began with a retelling of the first two original seasons.

=== Pilot (2001) ===
The pilot episode for the series, then under the working title Magic Bloom, featured the original five Winx members in attires similar to those of traditional European fairies. It was produced over a period of twelve months and was test-screened in 2002. Upon its completion, Straffi was unsatisfied with the pilot and doubted that it would succeed if aired. In a 2016 interview, Straffi recalled that it "looked like just another Japanese-style cartoon ... but nothing like [the modern] Winx." Straffi's team heavily reworked the pilot's visual style before starting work on a full season, leaving the original pilot unaired. Portions of the pilot were presented at the Lucca Comics & Games convention in 2018.

=== Season 1 (2004) ===
No. overall	No. in season	Italian title / Cinélume English title 4Kids English title	Italian air date	American air date
1	1	"Una fata a Gardenia" / "An Unexpected Event" "It Feels Like Magic"	28 January 2004	19 June 2004
2	2	"Benvenuti a Magix!" / "Welcome to Magix!" "More Than High School"	30 January 2004	26 June 2004
3	3	"L'anello di Stella" / "Alfea College for Fairies" "Save the First Dance"	2 February 2004	3 July 2004
4	4	"La palude di Melmamora" / "The Black-Mud Swamp" "The Voice of Nature"	4 February 2004	10 July 2004
5	5	"Appuntamento al buio" / "Date with Disaster" "Date with Disaster"	6 February 2004	17 July 2004
6	6	"Missione a Torrenuvola" / "Mission at Cloudtower" "Secret Guardian"	9 February 2004	24 July 2004
7	7	"A che servono gli amici?" / "Friends in Need" "Grounded"	11 February 2004	31 July 2004
8	8	"La festa della rosa" / "A Friendship Sundered" "The Day of the Rose"	13 February 2004	7 August 2004
9	9	"Il tradimento di Riven" / "Betrayed!" "Spelled"	16 February 2004	14 August 2004
10	10	"La Fiamma del Drago" / "Bloom Tested" "Magical Reality Check"	18 February 2004	21 August 2004
11	11	"Il regno delle ninfee" / "The Monster and The Willow" "Junior League"	20 February 2004	28 August 2004
12	12	"Miss Magix"	23 February 2004	4 September 2004
13	13	"La figlia del fuoco" / "A Great Secret Revealed" "Meant to Be"	25 February 2004	11 September 2004
14	14	"Il segreto di Bloom" / "Bloom's Dark Secret" "Witch Trap"	27 February 2004	18 September 2004
15	15	"Voci dal passato" / "Honor Above All" "Pushing the Envelope"	1 March 2004	25 September 2004
16	16	"Il nemico nell'ombra" / "Cold Spell" "The Nightmare Monster"	3 March 2004	2 October 2004
17	17	"Il segreto di Brandon" / "Secrets Within Secrets" "Royal Heartbreak"	5 March 2004	9 October 2004
18	18	"Addio Magix" / "The Font of Dragon Fire" "Senior Witches Go to Earth"	8 March 2004	16 October 2004
19	19	"Attacco ad Alfea" / "The Fall of Magix" "The Army of Decay"	10 March 2004	23 October 2004
20	20	"La scomparsa di Bloom" / "Mission to Domino" "Sparks of Hope"	12 March 2004	30 October 2004
21	21	"Trappola di ghiaccio" / "The Crown of Dreams" "The Frozen Palace"	15 March 2004	6 November 2004
22	22	"Il ritorno di Riven" / "Storming Cloudtower" "Mission to Cloud Tower"	17 March 2004	13 November 2004
23	23	"Fuga da Torrenuvola" / "Power Play" "The Search for the Flame"	19 March 2004	20 November 2004
24	24	"Il mistero del lago" / "The Witches' Siege" "Battle for Alfea"	22 March 2004	27 November 2004
25	25	"Il sonno di Magix" / "The Ultimate Challenge" "The Great Witch Invasion"	24 March 2004	4 December 2004
26	26	"Battaglia finale" / "The Witches' Downfall" "Fire and Ice"	26 March 2004	11 December 2004

=== Season 2 (2005) ===
No. overall	No. in season	Italian title / Cinélume English title 4Kids English title	Italian air date	American air date
27	1	"La fenice d'ombra" / "The Shadow Phoenix" "Back to School"	19 April 2005	September 10, 2005
28	2	"Il ritorno delle Trix" / "Up to Their Old Trix" "Princess of Tides"	21 April 2005	September 17, 2005
29	3	"Missione di salvataggio" / "Rescue Mission" "Into the Under Realm"	26 April 2005	September 24, 2005
30	4	"La Principessa Amentia" / "Princess Amentia" "Queen of Perfection"	28 April 2005	October 1, 2005
31	5	"Magico Bonding" / "Magic Bonding" "Rescuing the Pixies"	3 May 2005	October 8, 2005
32	6	"Il matrimonio di Brandon" / "Runaway Groom" "My Boyfriend's Wedding"	5 May 2005	October 15, 2005
33	7	"La pietra misteriosa" / "The Mysterious Stone" "The Dark Tower"	10 May 2005	October 22, 2005
34	8	"Il guastafeste" / "Party Crasher" "Party Monster"	12 May 2005	October 29, 2005
35	9	"Il segreto del Professor Avalon" / "Professor Avalon's Secret" "The Angel of Doom"	17 May 2005	November 5, 2005
36	10	"La cripta del codice" / "The Crypt of the Codex" "Reaching for the Sky"	19 May 2005	November 12, 2005
37	11	"Corsa contro il tempo" / "Race Against Time" "Homesick"	24 May 2005	November 19, 2005
38	12	"Unite per la vittoria" / "Winx Together!" "Truth or Dare"	26 May 2005	November 26, 2005
39	13	"La dama del ballo" / "The Invisible Pixies" "Gangs of Gardenia"	31 May 2005	December 3, 2005
40	14	"Battaglia sul pianeta Eraklyon" / "Battle on Planet Eraklyon" "The Wrong Righters"	2 June 2005	January 28, 2006
41	15	"Lo spettacolo continua" / "The Show Must Go On!" "Magic in My Heart"	7 June 2005	February 4, 2006
42	16	"HalloWinx!" "The Fourth Witch"	9 June 2005	February 11, 2006 (After episode 44)
43	17	"Gemellaggio con le Streghe" / "Twinning with the Witches" "Exchange Students"	14 June 2005	February 4, 2006 (After episode 41)
44	18	"Nel Cuore di Torrenuvola" / "In the Heart of Cloud Tower" "The Heart of Cloud Tower"	16 June 2005	February 11, 2006 (Before episode 42)
45	19	"La spia nell'ombra" / "The Spy in the Shadows" "Shadows in Bloom"	21 June 2005	February 18, 2006
46	20	"Il villaggio delle Pixies" / "Pixie Village" "The First Charmix"	23 June 2005	February 18, 2006
47	21	"Il potere del Charmix" / "Charmix Power" "Trouble in Paradise"	28 June 2005	February 25, 2006
48	22	"Wildland: La grande trappola" / "Danger in the Wildland" "Last Resorts"	30 June 2005	February 25, 2006
49	23	"Il momento della verità" / "The Time for Truth" "Darkness and Light"	5 July 2005	March 4, 2006
50	24	"Prigioniera di Darkar" / "Darkar's Prisoner" "Desperately Seeking Bloom"	7 July 2005	March 4, 2006
51	25	"Faccia a faccia con il nemico" / "Face to Face with the Enemy" "Storming Shadowhaunt"	12 July 2005	March 11, 2006
52	26	"Le ceneri della Fenice" / "The Phoenix Revealed" "The Ultimate Power Couple"	14 July 2005	March 11, 2006

=== Season 3 (2007) ===
No. overall	No. in season	Italian title / Cinélume English title 4Kids English title / Nickelodeon English title	Italian air date	American air dates (4Kids / Nick)
53	1	"Il ballo della principessa" / "The Princess' Ball" "The Princess Ball" / "The Perfect Dress"	29 January 2007	30 September 2006 (4Kids); 14 November 2011 (Nickelodeon)
54	2	"Il marchio di Valtor" / "Valtor's Mark" "Beauty is a Beast" / "Valtor's Plan"	31 January 2007	7 October 2006 (4Kids); 15 November 2011 (Nickelodeon)
55	3	"La principessa e la bestia" / "The Fairy and the Beast" "Pretty Pretty Princess" / "The Monster's Escape"	2 February 2007	28 October 2006 (4Kids); 16 November 2011 (Nickelodeon)
56	4	"Lo specchio della verità" / "The Mirror of Truth" "Mirror of Truth" / "Stella's Truth"	5 February 2007	4 November 2006 (4Kids); 17 November 2011 (Nickelodeon)
57	5	"Il Mare della Paura" / "The Sea of Fear" "Mission to Tides" / "Andros in Danger"	7 February 2007	11 November 2006 (4Kids); 18 November 2011 (Nickelodeon)
58	6	"La scelta di Aisha" / "Aisha's Choice" "The Mermaid Queen" / "Aisha's Courage"	9 February 2007	18 November 2006 (4Kids); 28 November 2011 (Nickelodeon)
59	7	"La compagnia della luce" / "The Company of the Light" "Royal Behavior" / "Heroes of the Past"	12 February 2007	25 November 2006 (4Kids); 29 November 2011 (Nickelodeon)
60	8	"Una sleale avversaria" / "A Disloyal Adversary" "Dark Sky" / "Diaspro's Deception"	14 February 2007	24 February 2007 (4Kids); 30 November 2011 (Nickelodeon)
61	9	"Il cuore e la spada" / "The Heart and The Sword" "Operation Boyfriend Rescue" / "Breaking the Mark"	16 February 2007	3 March 2007 (4Kids); 1 December 2011 (Nickelodeon)
62	10	"Alfea sotto assedio" / "Alfea Under Siege" "Attack of the Zombie Witches" / "Taking Over Cloudtower"	19 February 2007	10 March 2007 (4Kids); 2 December 2011 (Nickelodeon)
63	11	"Trappola per fate" / "A Trap for Fairies" "Missing in Action" / "Facing the Enemy"	21 February 2007	17 March 2007 (4Kids); 5 December 2011 (Nickelodeon)
64	12	"Le lacrime del salice nero" / "The Black Willow's Tears" "Tears From the Black Willow" / "A Journey to Lynphea"	23 February 2007	24 March 2007 (4Kids); 6 December 2011 (Nickelodeon)
65	13	"Un ultimo battito d'ali" / "One Last Fluttering of Wings" "Point of No Return" / "Tecna's Sacrifice"	26 February 2007	31 March 2007 (4Kids); 7 December 2011 (Nickelodeon)
66	14	"Furia!" / "Fury!" "Payback" / "Revenge!"	28 February 2007	7 April 2007 (4Kids); 8 December 2011 (Nickelodeon)
67	15	"L'isola dei draghi" / "The Island of Dragons" "The Island of Dragons" / "Dragon Quest"	2 March 2007	14 April 2007 (4Kids); 9 December 2011 (Nickelodeon)
68	16	"Dalle ceneri" / "From the Ashes" "The Power Within" / "Building Hope"	5 March 2007	21 April 2007 (4Kids); 12 December 2011 (Nickelodeon)
69	17	"Nella tana del serpente" / "In the Snake's Lair" "The Omega Mission"	7 March 2007	28 April 2007 (4Kids); 13 December 2011 (Nickelodeon)
70	18	"Lo scrigno di Valtor" / "Valtor's Box" "Day at the Museum" / "The Museum of Magic"	9 March 2007	28 July 2007 (4Kids); 14 December 2011 (Nickelodeon)
71	19	"All'ultimo minuto" / "At the Last Moment" "Biker Chick Wedding Crashers" / "Back to Solaria"	12 March 2007	4 August 2007 (4Kids); 15 December 2011 (Nickelodeon)
72	20	"La carica delle Pixie" / "The Pixies' Charge" "Little Big Shots" / "The Pixies Fight Back"	14 March 2007	11 August 2007 (4Kids); 16 December 2011 (Nickelodeon)
73	21	"La torre rossa" / "The Red Tower" "The Golden Kingdom" / "Beyond the Magic Dimension"	16 March 2007	18 August 2007 (4Kids); 19 December 2011 (Nickelodeon)
74	22	"Il labirinto di cristallo" / "The Crystal Labyrinth" "The Crystal Labyrinth" / "Finding Your Way"	19 March 2007	25 August 2007 (4Kids); 20 December 2011 (Nickelodeon)
75	23	"La sfida dei maghi" / "The Wizards' Challenge" "The Wizard's Challenge" / "The Water Stars"	21 March 2007	1 September 2007 (4Kids); 21 December 2011 (Nickelodeon)
76	24	"La rivelazione delle streghe" / "Witches' Revelation" "The Witches' Crypt" / "Seeking the Truth"	23 March 2007	8 September 2007 (4Kids); 22 December 2011 (Nickelodeon)
77	25	"L'ira dello stregone" / "Wizard's Anger" "The Spell of the Elements" / "Valtor's Fury"	26 March 2007	15 September 2007 (4Kids); 23 December 2011 (Nickelodeon)
78	26	"Un nuovo inizio" / "A New Beginning" "Fire and Flame" / "The Final Battle"	28 March 2007	22 September 2007 (4Kids); 26 December 2011 (Nickelodeon)

=== Season 4 (2009) ===
No. overall	No. in season	Italian title / Cinélume English title Nickelodeon English title	Italian air date	American air date (Nick)
79	1	"I cacciatori di fate" / "The Fairy Hunters" "The Wizards of the Black Circle"	15 April 2009	May 6, 2012
80	2	"L'albero della vita" / "The Tree of Life" "Fear in Pixie Village"	17 April 2009	May 6, 2012
81	3	"L'ultima fata della terra" / "The Last Fairy on Earth" "Winx on Earth"	20 April 2009	May 13, 2012
82	4	"Love & Pet" "Magic Pets"	22 April 2009	May 13, 2012
83	5	"Il regalo di Mitzi" / "Mitzi's Present" "Ogron's Spell"	24 April 2009	May 20, 2012
84	6	"Una fata in pericolo" / "A Fairy in Danger" "A Fairy Found"	27 April 2009	May 20, 2012
85	7	"Winx Believix" "I Believe In You"	29 April 2009	May 27, 2012
86	8	"Il cerchio bianco" / "The White Circle" "Hidden in the Country"	1 May 2009	May 27, 2012
87	9	"Nebula" "Nebula's White Circle"	4 May 2009	June 3, 2012
88	10	"La canzone di Musa" / "Musa's Song" "The Audition"	6 May 2009	June 3, 2012
89	11	"Winx Club per sempre!" / "Winx Club Forever!" "Superheroes"	8 May 2009	June 10, 2012
90	12	"Papà! Sono una fata!" / "Dad! I'm a Fairy!" "The Pets' Pursuit"	11 May 2009	June 10, 2012
91	13	"L'attacco degli stregoni" / "The Wizards' Attack" "Roxy's Energy"	13 May 2009	June 17, 2012
92	14	"7: Il numero perfetto" / "7: The Perfect Number" "Bringing Magic Back"	14 October 2009	June 17, 2012
93	15	"Lezioni di magia" / "Magic Lessons" "The New Witch in Town"	16 October 2009	June 24, 2012
94	16	"Un mondo virtuale" / "A Virtual World" "A Virtual Hideout"	19 October 2009	June 24, 2012
95	17	"L'isola incantata" / "The Enchanted Island" "Island Tricks"	21 October 2009	July 1, 2012
96	18	"La furia della natura" / "The Nature Rage" "Diana's Attack"	26 October 2009	July 1, 2012
97	19	"Nel regno di Diana" / "In Diana's Kingdom" "In the Amazon Forest"	28 October 2009	July 8, 2012
98	20	"I doni del destino" / "The Gifts of Destiny" "Diana's Redemption"	30 October 2009	July 8, 2012
99	21	"La caverna di Sibylla" / "Sibylla's Cave" "The Fairy of Justice"	2 November 2009	July 15, 2012
100	22	"La Torre Gelata" / "The Frozen Tower" "Aurora's Tower"	6 November 2009	July 15, 2012
101	23	"La prova di Bloom" / "Bloom's Trial" "Bloom's Challenge"	6 November 2009	July 22, 2012
102	24	"Il giorno della giustizia" / "The Day of Justice" "The Wizard's Trap"	9 November 2009	July 22, 2012
103	25	"Il segreto di Morgana" / "Morgana's Secrets" "Home at Last"	11 November 2009	July 29, 2012
104	26	"Ghiaccio e fuoco" / "Ice and Fire" "Duel in the Omega Dimension"	13 November 2009	July 29, 2012

== Revived series ==
After Viacom became a co-owner of the Rainbow studio in 2011, new seasons of Winx Club entered production at Viacom's Nickelodeon Animation Studio and Rainbow. In this revamped series, the Winx are once again students at Alfea, as they were before their graduation in the original show. The revival began with four specials that retell the original first and second seasons. Nickelodeon's American writers aimed to make the series multicultural and appealing toward viewers from different countries. In 2019, Straffi commented on his near-decade of collaboration with Nickelodeon, saying that "the know-how of Rainbow and the know-how of Nickelodeon are very complementary; the sensibilities of the Americans, with our European touch."

=== Specials (2011) ===
Italian title English title	Italian air date	American air date
"Il destino di Bloom" "The Fate of Bloom"	21 November 2011	27 June 2011
Bloom, a 16-year-old ordinary girl from Gardenia, is on summer vacation when she stumbles upon a battle between a 17-year-old fairy named Stella and an ogre named Knut. Bloom stands against the monster and suddenly discovers that she has magical powers. Stella offers Bloom the opportunity to attend the Alfea College for Fairies, which Bloom and her parents agree to. The two fairies soon meet their roommates: Flora, Tecna, and Musa. After an encounter with the Trix witches from the competing college of Cloud Tower, the fairies decide to form their own group: the Winx Club.
"La vendetta delle Trix" "Revenge of the Trix"	28 November 2011	1 August 2011
A mysterious nymph named Daphne communicates with Bloom through a dream. During spring break, Bloom returns home and bonds with her parents. While in Gardenia, Bloom dreams about her dad rescuing a baby left unharmed in a fire. After telling her parents, Bloom realizes that the event in her dream actually happened, and that she was the baby in the fire. Later on, Bloom visits Cloudtower's library to learn more about herself. Meanwhile, the Trix devise a plan to steal Bloom's Dragon Flame powers.
"Battaglia per Magix" "The Battle for Magix"	5 December 2011	18 September 2011
After the Trix take Bloom's powers, the three witches take over Cloudtower and take down Headmistress Griffin. Through the power of the Dragon Flame, the Trix summon an Army of Darkness to start a reign of terror. Bloom returns to Alfea, powerless without her Dragon Flame. She teams up with Sky, Stella, Brandon, and Knut to confront the Trix at Cloudtower and reclaim her powers. Once she talks with Daphne, Bloom is able to regain her Dragon Flame and join her friends in a final battle. She faces Icy one-on-one while the other fairies face Darcy and Stormy. After Bloom manages to beat her rival, the friends celebrate, and Bloom and Sky share their first kiss.
"La fenice d'ombra" "The Shadow Phoenix"	12 December 2011	16 October 2011
Aisha, the princess of Andros and Fairy of Waves, tries to rescue a group of pixies from the Shadow Phoenix. She is caught by him and is forced down a cliff. Aisha arrives at Alfea where she meets the Winx. Bloom and Stella offer to help her, leaving Flora, Musa, and Tecna to take care of a baby pixie named Piff. Meanwhile, the Shadow Phoenix breaks the Trix out of prison. Bloom and Stella duel with the Trix while Aisha saves the pixies. Later, a paladin named Professor Avalon offers to help Bloom uncover more about her past. Avalon brings Bloom to a fortress and reveals his true identity as the Shadow Phoenix. The Winx and Specialists fly to the fortress and eventually defeat the Shadow Phoenix.

=== Season 5 (2012–13) ===
No. overall	No. in season	Italian title Nickelodeon English title	Italian air date	American air date
105	1	"Minaccia dall'oceano" "The Spill"	16 October 2012	2 September 2012
106	2	"L'ascesa di Tritannus" "The Rise of Tritannus"	17 October 2012	9 September 2012
107	3	"Ritorno ad Alfea" "Return to Alfea"	18 October 2012	16 September 2012
108	4	"Il libro Sirenix" "The Sirenix Book"	19 October 2012	23 September 2012
109	5	"Il magico Lilo" "The Lilo"	22 October 2012	26 August 2012
110	6	"Potere Harmonix" "The Power of Harmonix"	23 October 2012	7 October 2012
111	7	"Le conchiglie luccicanti" "The Shimmering Shells"	24 October 2012	14 October 2012
112	8	"La melodia del rubino" "Secret of the Ruby Reef"	25 October 2012	28 October 2012
113	9	"La gemma dell'empatia" "The Gem of Empathy"	26 October 2012	4 November 2012
114	10	"Natale ad Alfea" "A Magix Christmas"	29 October 2012	9 December 2012
115	11	"Le Trix in agguato" "Trix Tricks"	30 October 2012	11 November 2012
116	12	"Prova di coraggio" "Test of Courage"	1 November 2012	18 November 2012
117	13	"Le fate Sirenix" "Sirenix"	2 November 2012	25 November 2012
118	14	"Il trono dell'imperatore" "The Emperor's Throne"	8 April 2013	17 February 2013
119	15	"Il pilastro della luce" "The Pillar of Light"	9 April 2013	24 February 2013
120	16	"L'eclisse" "The Eclipse"	10 April 2013	3 March 2013
121	17	"L'occhio che ispira le fate" "Faraway Reflections"	11 April 2013	10 March 2013
122	18	"Il divoratore" "The Devourer"	12 April 2013	17 March 2013
123	19	"Le balene del canto" "The Singing Whales"	15 April 2013	31 March 2013
124	20	"Problemi sentimentali" "The Problems of Love"	16 April 2013	31 March 2013
125	21	"Un appuntamento perfetto" "A Perfect Date"	17 April 2013	7 April 2013
126	22	"Ascolta il tuo cuore" "Listen to Your Heart"	18 April 2013	5 May 2013
127	23	"Sulle tracce di Politea" "The Shark's Eye"	19 April 2013	12 May 2013
128	24	"Il respiro dell'oceano" "Saving Paradise Bay"	22 April 2013	8 September 2013
129	25	"Scontro epico" "Battle for the Infinite Ocean"	23 April 2013	15 September 2013
130	26	"La fine dell'incubo" "The End of Tritannus"	24 April 2013	22 September 2013

=== Season 6 (2014) ===
No. overall	No. in season	Italian title Nickelodeon English title	Italian air date	American air date
131	1	"L'ispirazione del Sirenix" "Inspiration of Sirenix"	6 January 2014	September 29, 2013
132	2	"Legendarium" "The Legendarium"	13 January 2014	November 3, 2013
133	3	"Il collegio volante" "The Flying School"	20 January 2014	November 3, 2013
134	4	"Il potere Bloomix" "Bloomix Power"	31 January 2014	December 15, 2013
135	5	"Golden Auditorium" "The Golden Auditorium"	7 February 2014	December 15, 2013
136	6	"I mangiafuoco" "Vortex of Flames"	14 February 2014	January 12, 2014
137	7	"La biblioteca perduta" "The Lost Library"	17 February 2014	February 16, 2014
138	8	"L'attacco della sfinge" "Attack of the Sphinx"	10 February 2014	February 16, 2014
139	9	"Il tempio del drago verde" "Shrine of the Green Dragon"	3 March 2014	August 3, 2015
140	10	"La serra di Alfea" "The Secret Greenhouse"	10 March 2014	August 5, 2015
141	11	"Sogni infranti" "Broken Dreams"	17 March 2014	August 7, 2015
142	12	"I figli della notte" "Shimmer in the Shadows"	24 March 2014	August 10, 2015
143	13	"La fata madrina" "The Fairy Godmother"	31 March 2014	August 12, 2015
144	14	"Mythix"	7 April 2014	August 14, 2015
145	15	"Il mistero di Calavera" "Mystery of Calavera"	31 July 2014	August 17, 2015
146	16	"L'invasione degli zombie" "Zombie Invasion"	1 August 2014	August 19, 2015
147	17	"La maledizione di Fearwood" "The Curse of Fearwood"	1 August 2014	August 21, 2015
148	18	"Il totem magico" "The Magic Totem"	1 August 2014	September 9, 2015
149	19	"Regina per un giorno" "Queen for a Day"	2 August 2014	September 11, 2015
150	20	"Il banchetto di Solaria" "Stella's Big Party"	2 August 2014	September 15, 2015
151	21	"Un amore mostruoso" "A Monster Crush"	2 August 2014	September 17, 2015
152	22	"Music Café" "The Music Cafe"	3 August 2014	November 8, 2015
153	23	"L'inno di Alfea" "The Anthem"	3 August 2014	November 8, 2015
154	24	"Scontro fra campioni" "Legendary Duel"	3 August 2014	November 15, 2015
155	25	"Acheron"	3 August 2014	November 15, 2015
156	26	"Winx per sempre" "Winx Forever"	4 August 2014	November 22, 2015

=== Season 7 (2015) ===
No. overall	No. in season	Italian title Nick Jr. English title	Italian air date	American air date
157	1	"Il parco naturale di Alfea" "The Alfea Natural Park"	25 September 2017	
158	2	"Giovani fate crescono" "Young Fairies Grow Up"	25 September 2017	
159	3	"Butterflix"	26 September 2017	
160	4	"Il primo colore dell'universo" "The First Color of the Universe"	26 September 2017	
161	5	"Un amico dal passato" "A Friend from the Past"	27 September 2017	
162	6	"Avventura su Lynphea" "Adventure on Lynphea"	27 September 2017	
163	7	"Attenti al magilupo" "Beware of the Wolf"	28 September 2017	
164	8	"Ritorno al medioevo" "Back in the Middle Ages"	28 September 2017	
165	9	"Il gatto magico" "The Fairy Cat"	29 September 2017	
166	10	"Winx in trappola!" "Winx Trapped!"	29 September 2017	
167	11	"Missione nella giungla" "Mission in the Jungle"	30 September 2017	
168	12	"Un animale fatato per Tecna" "A Fairy Animal for Tecna"	30 September 2017	
169	13	"Il segreto dell'unicorno" "The Unicorn's Secret"	1 October 2017	
170	14	"Potere Tynix" "Tynix Transformation"	1 October 2017	
171	15	"Le pietre magiche" "The Magic Stones"	2 October 2017	
172	16	"Ritorno a Baia Paradiso" "Back to Paradise Bay"	2 October 2017	
173	17	"Viaggio in una goccia" "Lost in a Droplet"	3 October 2017	
174	18	"Il rapimento di Stella" "Banana Day"	3 October 2017	
175	19	"L'arcobaleno di Magix" (Note: "L'arcobaleno di Magix" is misrepresented as "L'arcobaleno di Magic" on the title card.) "The Magix Rainbow"	4 October 2017	
176	20	"Baby Winx"	4 October 2017	
177	21	"Pazzo, pazza mondo" "It's a Crazy, Crazy World"	5 October 2017	
178	22	"Il regno dei diamanti" "The Kingdom of Diamonds"	5 October 2017	
179	23	"Il cuore di Alfea" "The Secret of Alfea"	6 October 2017	
180	24	"La farfalla dorata" "The Golden Butterfly"	6 October 2017	
181	25	"Un patto inatteso" "New Magic Harmony"	7 October 2017	
182	26	"Il potere degli animali fatati" "The Power of the Fairy Animals"	7 October 2017	

=== Season 8 (2019) ===
No. overall	No. in season	Italian title English title	Italian air date
183	1	"La notte delle stelle" "Night of the Stars"	15 April 2019
184	2	"Il regno delle Lumen" "A Kingdom of Lumens"	16 April 2019
185	3	"Attacco al nucleo" "Attack on the Core"	17 April 2019
186	4	"Popstar!" "Popstars!"	18 April 2019
187	5	"Il segreto di Orion" "Orion's Secret"	19 April 2019
188	6	"La stella faro" "Doom of the Lighthouse Star"	21 April 2019
189	7	"Trappola su Prometia" "Trapped on Prometia"	22 April 2019
190	8	"Negli abissi di Andros" "Into the Depths of Andros"	23 April 2019
191	9	"La luce di Gorgol" "The Light of Gorgol"	24 April 2019
192	10	"Il potere dell'Idra" "Hydra Awakens"	25 April 2019
193	11	"Il tesoro magico di Syderia" "Treasures of Syderia"	26 April 2019
194	12	"Festa a sorpresa" "Surprise Party on Earth"	28 April 2019
195	13	"L'ombra di Valtor" "Valtor's Shadow"	29 April 2019
196	14	"La stella dei desideri" "The Wishing Star"	29 July 2019
197	15	"Una nuova missione" "Mission for the Prime Stars"	30 July 2019
198	16	"La festa dello Sparx" "The Sparx Festival"	31 July 2019
199	17	"Il vestito della regina" "Dress Fit for a Queen"	1 August 2019
200	18	"La valle degli unicorni alati" "Valley of the Flying Unicorns"	2 August 2019
201	19	"La torre oltre le nuvole" "Tower Beyond the Clouds"	3 August 2019
202	20	"Il cuore verde di Lynphea" "The Green Heart of Lynphea"	11 September 2019
203	21	"La gara di ballo su Melody" "Dance Contest on Melody"	12 September 2019
204	22	"Il segreto dell'armonia" "The Secret of Harmony"	13 September 2019
205	23	"Fra terra e mare" "Between the Earth and the Sea"	14 September 2019
206	24	"Tra i ghiacci di Dyamond" "Dyamond on Ice"	15 September 2019
207	25	"La volpe bianca" "The White Fox"	16 September 2019
208	26	"Scritto nelle stelle" "Written in the Stars"	17 September 2019

== Films ==
=== The Secret of the Lost Kingdom (2007) ===
On 8 October 2006, a Winx Club CGI film was announced on Rainbow's website. The Secret of the Lost Kingdom was released in Italy on 30 November 2007. Its television premiere was on 11 March 2012 on Nickelodeon in the United States. The plot takes place after the events of the first three seasons.

Title	Directed by	Written by	Release date (Italy)
Winx Club: The Secret of the Lost Kingdom	Iginio Straffi	Iginio Straffi and Sean Molyneaux	30 November 2007

=== Magical Adventure (2010) ===
In 2007, production began on a sequel to The Secret of the Lost Kingdom, before the fourth season had been written. It was released in Italy on 29 October 2010. Its television premiere was on 20 May 2013, on Nickelodeon in the United States.

Title	Directed by	Written by	Release date (Italy)
Winx Club 3D: Magical Adventure	Iginio Straffi	Iginio Straffi and Sean Molyneaux	29 October 2010

=== The Mystery of the Abyss (2014) ===
In late 2010, it was announced that Viacom (the owner of Nickelodeon and eventual co-owner of Rainbow) would provide the resources necessary to produce a new Winx film. The movie follows the events of the fifth season and was released in Italy on 4 September 2014. The film made its television premiere on Nickelodeon Germany on 8 August 2015.

Title	Directed by	Written by	Release date (Italy)
Winx Club: The Mystery of the Abyss	Iginio Straffi	Iginio Straffi and Giovanni Masi	4 September 2014
