= Winx Club: Magical Fairy Party =

2012 video game

- Developer: 1st Playable Productions
- Publishers: NA: D3 Publisher; EU: Namco Bandai Games
- Platform: Nintendo DS
- Release: NA: October 30, 2012; PAL: November 30, 2012
- Genre: Simulation
- Mode: Single-player

Winx Club: Magical Fairy Party is a 2012 video game developed by 1st Playable Productions and released on October 30, 2012 for the Nintendo DS.

It is the tenth video game based on the animated series Winx Club, and the first one published during the time the series was co-produced by Nickelodeon. It received positive reviews.

== Gameplay ==
Unlike most Nintendo DS titles, Winx Club: Magical Fairy Party is played vertically instead of horizontally, which requires the player to hold the DS system sideways like a book. The game is played by tapping the stylus on the touch screen.

The storyline covers a year at Alfea College for Fairies, where the player is a new student. The player designs the new fairy by choosing from hundreds of different clothing and wing designs. Through a series of minigames, the player helps prepare for an end-of-year party. Each of these games is based on one of the six main characters from Winx Club. The minigames are Bloom's Fireworks (making fireworks by matching shapes), Stella's Cakes (decorating a cake), Tecna's Poster Store (designing and coloring posters), Aisha's Alchemy (connecting straws to mix fruit punch), Musa's Music (choosing a soundtrack by collecting music notes), and Flora's Centerpieces (decorating a plant centerpiece).

== Development ==
The game was released as part of a two-game deal between Nickelodeon and D3 Publisher, the other game being Victorious: Taking the Lead.

== Reception ==
Winx Club: Magical Fairy Party received generally positive reviews. Kayla Zay of The Denver Post gave the game 3.5 out of 4 stars. She wrote, "I have to admit, the different outfits and designing cakes were surprisingly fun. The game is set up for the design enthusiast... A fully customizable game, Winx Club: Magical Fairy Party will not disappoint your little fashionista." Common Sense Media's Erin Bell gave the game 3 out of 5 stars, writing that it "is a fun dress-up game for tween girls, with hundreds of outfits and accessories to adorn a fairy character. However, the storytelling is weak, and the mini-games become repetitive since they don't scale to greater difficulty."
