= Winx Club =

Animated television series

- Genre: Action; Adventure; Comedy; Fantasy; Magical girl
- Created by: Iginio Straffi
- Directed by: Iginio Straffi
- Countries of origin: Italy; United States (Specials, S5–S7)
- Original languages: Italian; English (Specials, S5–S7)
- No. of seasons: 8
- No. of episodes: 208 (+ 4 hour-long specials) (list of episodes)

Production
- Executive producers: Joanne Lee (S1–S7); Massimiliano Gusberti (S1–S4); Annita Romanelli (S5); Kay Wilson Stallings (S5–S6); Iginio Straffi (S7–S8)
- Producers: Iginio Straffi (S1–S6); Annita Romanelli (S1–S4)
- Editors: Francesco Artibani (S1–S7); Maurizio De Angelis (S5–S7)
- Running time: 24 minutes
- Production companies: Rainbow; Rai Fiction (S1-S7); Nickelodeon Animation Studio (S5–S7); Rai Ragazzi (S8)

Original release
- Network: RAI channels (Italy); Nickelodeon (International)
- Release: 28 January 2004 – 13 November 2009
- Release: 27 June 2011 – 17 September 2019

Related
- PopPixie; World of Winx; Fate: The Winx Saga; Winx Club: The Magic Is Back

Winx Club is an animated series produced by Rainbow, with later seasons co-produced by Nickelodeon. (Note: In 2011, Nickelodeon owner Viacom acquired 30% of Rainbow S.p.A., and Nickelodeon Animation Studio joined the production of Winx Club.) It was created and directed by Italian animator Iginio Straffi. It premiered on 28 January 2004, becoming a ratings success in Italy and on Nickelodeon networks internationally. The series is set in a magical universe inhabited by fairies, witches, and other mythical creatures, and tells the story of Bloom, a teenage girl from planet Earth who discovers she is a fairy. Enrolling at Alfea College, she befriends four other fairies and forms a group called the Winx Club, fighting a long series of enemies threatening the Magic Dimension, and in the process, discovering her true origins and the fate of her biological family.

Straffi's original storyline for Winx lasted three seasons, but he chose to continue with a fourth season in 2009. Around this time, Winx Club's popularity attracted the attention of American media company Viacom, who acquired 30% of Rainbow S.p.A. in 2011. Starting in 2010, Rainbow began producing new seasons of Winx Club with Nickelodeon Animation Studio; episodes were jointly written by the Italian and American teams, with Nickelodeon aiming to make the series multicultural and appealing to viewers from different countries. To attract American audiences, Viacom assembled a voice cast that included notable Nickelodeon actors (such as Elizabeth Gillies and Ariana Grande), invested US$100 million in advertising for the series, and inducted Winx Club into the Nicktoons franchise. The continued partnership between Rainbow and Nickelodeon on Winx Club led to the development of more co-productions, including Club 57 in 2019, on which much of Winx Club's staff worked.

The series faced budget cuts during production of its seventh season, resulting in the removal of the Hollywood voice cast and 3D-animated segments. After the seventh season premiered worldwide in 2015, Winx entered a four-year hiatus until the eighth season premiered in 2019. At Straffi's decision, the new season was heavily retooled for a preschool target audience.

A live-action young adult adaptation of Winx Club, Fate: The Winx Saga, premiered on Netflix in 2021 and lasted two seasons. In January 2023, Viacom (now known as Paramount) sold its stake in Rainbow back to Straffi, allowing him full control of the studio's new projects. This included an animated reboot of Winx Club, Winx Club: The Magic Is Back, which premiered in 2025.

== Premise ==
The main characters of Winx Club are girls who can transform into fairy warriors. Clockwise from left: Bloom, Flora, Tecna, Musa, Stella, Aisha.

The series follows the adventures of a group of six girls known as the Winx, students at the Alfea College for Fairies. The team is made up of Bloom, the Fairy of the Dragon Flame; Stella, the Fairy of the Sun and Moon (later Fairy of the Shining Sun); Musa, the Fairy of Music; Tecna, the Fairy of Technology; and Flora, the Fairy of Nature. In the second season Aisha, the Fairy of Waves, became the sixth member of the group, and in the fourth season, Roxy, the Fairy of Animals, became the occasional seventh member of the group. The main male characters are the Specialists, a group of students at the Red Fountain school who are also the Winx fairies' boyfriends. They include Bloom's boyfriend Sky; Stella's boyfriend Brandon; Flora's boyfriend Helia; Tecna's boyfriend Timmy; and Musa's boyfriend Riven. Unlike their female counterparts, the Specialists do not have magical powers and instead, train to fight using laser weapons. A mage named Nabu, Aisha's deceased first boyfriend, joins the group of boys from the third season to his death near the end of the fourth season, and was later replaced by a Paladin named Nex in the sixth season. The Winx and Specialists' most common adversaries are a trio of witches named the Trix: Icy, Darcy, and Stormy, all former students of the Cloud Tower school.

Winx Club is set in a vast universe with several dimensions. Most episodes take place in the Magic Dimension, which is closed off to ordinary people and inhabited by creatures from European mythology like fairies, witches, and monsters. The capital of this world is the city of Magix—which is located on the planet of the same name—where the three main magic schools are situated. The other planets of the Magic Dimension include Bloom's home planet Domino, Stella's home planet Solaria, Flora's home planet Lynphea, Tecna's home planet Zenith, Musa's home planet Melody, Aisha's home planet Andros, and Roxy's home planet Earth. Some episodes take place on Earth, where Bloom also spent her childhood.

== Episodes ==
Season	Episodes	Originally released	
Season	Episodes	First released	Last released
Original series
1	26	28 January 2004	26 March 2004
2	26	19 April 2005	14 July 2005
3	26	29 January 2007	28 March 2007
4	26	15 April 2009	13 November 2009
Revived series
Specials	4	21 November 2011 (Note: The specials and seasons 5-7 were co-developed with Nickelodeon and premiered on Nickelodeon networks ahead of the Italian broadcasts. Season 5 premiered on Nick U.S. on 26 August 2012, season 6 premiered on Nick U.S. on 29 September 2013, and season 7 premiered on Nick Asia on 22 June 2015.)	12 December 2011
5	26	16 October 2012	24 April 2013
6	26	6 January 2014	4 August 2014
7	26	21 September 2015	3 October 2015
8	26	15 April 2019	17 September 2019

== Development ==
=== Concept and creation ===
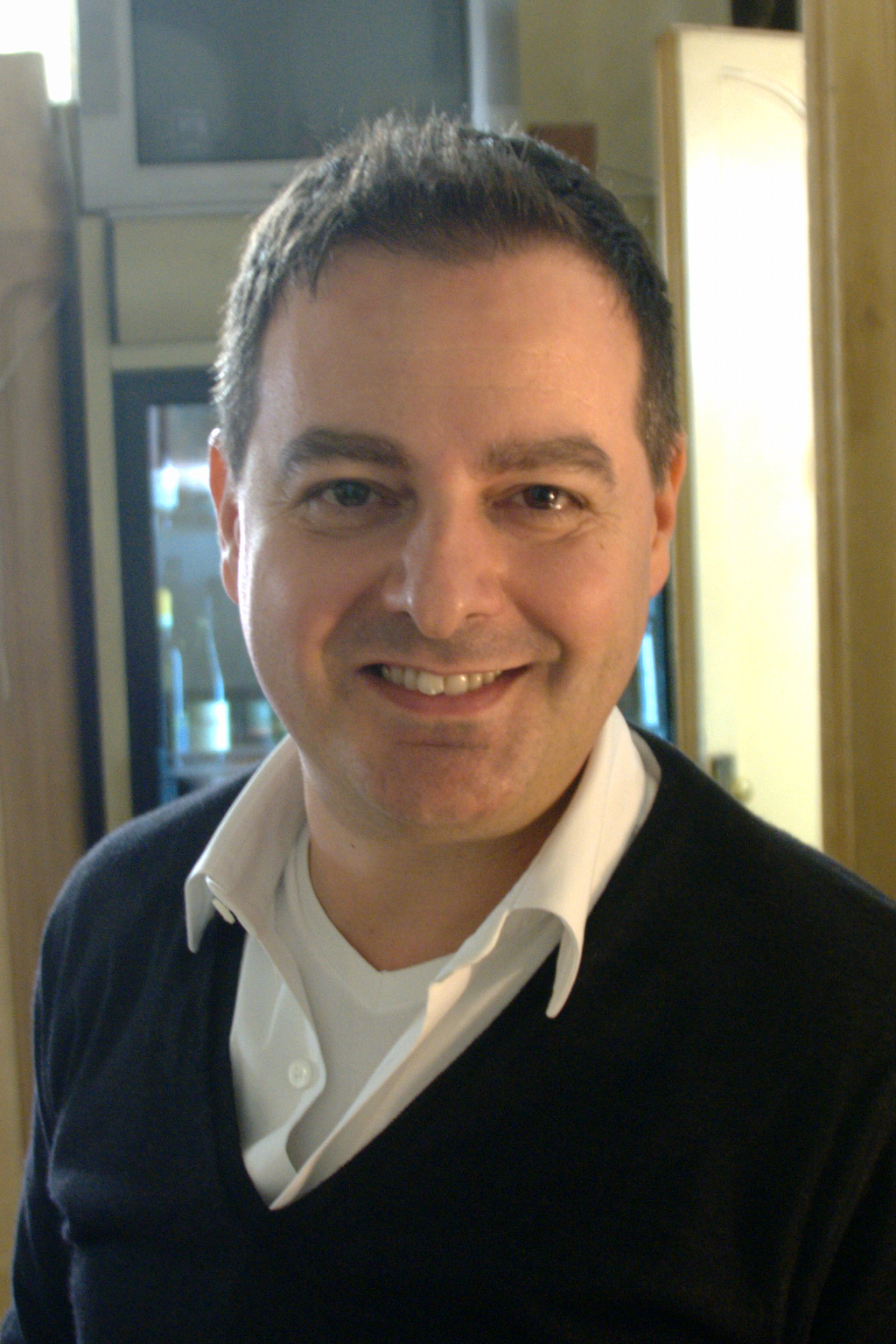
Iginio Straffi, creator of Winx Club

During the 1990s, comic artist Iginio Straffi noticed that most action cartoons were focused on male heroes; at that time, he felt that the "cartoon world was devoid of female characters". Straffi hoped to introduce an alternative show with a female lead aged 16 to 18, as he wanted to "explore the psychological side" of the transition to adulthood. He decided to develop a pilot centred on the conflict between two rival colleges; one for fairies and another for witches. Straffi compared his original premise to "a sort of 'Oxford–Cambridge rivalry' in a magical dimension". In expanding the concept, Iginio Straffi drew his inspiration from Japanese manga and the comics of Sergio Bonelli.

Straffi's pilot, which was titled "Magic Bloom", featured the original five Winx members in attires like those of traditional European fairies. It was produced during a twelve-month development period that included animation tests, character studies, and market surveys. The animation attracted the interest of Rai Fiction, which paid for 25% of the production cost in exchange for Italian broadcast rights and a share of the series' revenue over 15 years. After holding test screenings of the pilot, however, Straffi was unhappy with the audience's unenthusiastic reaction to the characters' outdated clothing style and stated that the pilot did not satisfy him. In a 2016 interview, Straffi said the result "looked like just another Japanese-style cartoon ... but nothing like [the modern] Winx". He likened his feelings about the pilot to an "existential crisis" and chose to scrap the entire test animation despite an investment of over €100,000 in the completed pilot.

To rework the concept, Straffi's team hired Italian fashion designers to restyle the show and give the characters a brighter, more modern appearance. Production of the restyled series began by 2002, and Rainbow estimated the episodes would be delivered to distributors by late 2003. The new name of the series ("Winx") was derived from the English word "wings". Straffi's aim was to appeal to both genders, including action sequences designed for male viewers and fashion elements for female viewers. At the October 2003 MIPCOM event, Rainbow screened the show's first episode to international companies. The first season had its world premiere on Italian television channel Rai 2 on 28 January 2004.

From the beginning of development, Iginio Straffi planned an overarching plot that would end after "a maximum" of 78 episodes. Straffi stated that the Winx saga "would not last forever" in 2007, and he intended the first movie (Winx Club: The Secret of the Lost Kingdom) to resolve any plot points remaining from the third-season finale. In 2008, Straffi decided to extend the series, citing its increasing popularity.

=== Nickelodeon revival ===
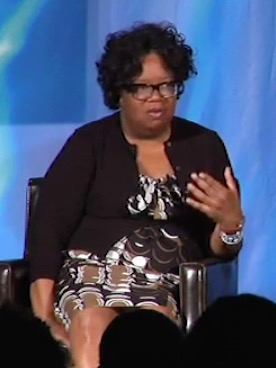
Nickelodeon's Janice Burgess, who was the story editor and creative director on the revival

In September 2010, Rainbow S.p.A. announced they had entered into a worldwide broadcast and production deal with Nickelodeon that would see the broadcaster air the series in several territories, alongside co-producing and developing seasons 5 and 6 with them, effectively reviving the series. Nickelodeon Consumer Products also secured merchandising rights to the revival in some regions, including the United States. Viacom would finance and staff the revived series, dividing production between Viacom's Nickelodeon Animation Studio in the United States and Rainbow S.p.A. in Italy.

In February 2011, Nickelodeon's parent company Viacom acquired a 30% stake in Rainbow S.p.A. for €62 million (equivalent to US$83 million). Viacom originally planned to buy out the entire Rainbow studio, but wanted to keep Iginio Straffi at the helm, leaving Straffi with 70%.

The revived series began with four special episodes that summarize the first two seasons of the original show, followed by redubbed versions of the third and fourth seasons and the fifth, sixth, and seventh seasons. As the production team was divided between two countries, Nickelodeon released a statement commenting on how Winx Club was an unusual production for the company: "It's not our usual practice to co-produce cartoons; we make them by ourselves. But we strongly believe in Winx." Winx Club was officially inducted into Nickelodeon's franchise of Nicktoons, a brand that encompasses original animated productions created for the network. On each episode of the revived series, Nickelodeon approved scripts and all phases of animation. Nickelodeon brought on some of its long-time staff members, such as creative director Janice Burgess, and writers Sascha Paladino, Adam Peltzman, and Carin Greenberg.

On 7 April 2014, Rainbow and Nickelodeon announced their continuing partnership on the seventh season of Winx Club, with a planned premiere date of 2015. Straffi said of the season: "It will be a privilege to partner once more with Nickelodeon on this." During production, Rainbow was undergoing a multimillion-euro financial loss due to the box-office failure of its 2012 film Gladiators of Rome. They subsequently decided to cut costs on Winx Club, its most expensive show. The CGI-animated segments and California voice cast from the previous two seasons were deemed too costly to continue using for the seventh season. As with the previous two seasons, the copyright to the seventh season is co-owned by Rainbow and Viacom. The first episode aired on 22 June 2015, on Nickelodeon in Asia, followed by its American broadcast on the Nick Jr. Channel on 10 January 2016.

External videos
- Interview clip of Straffi in 2019, commenting on his continued work with Nickelodeon.

The president of Nickelodeon International, Pierluigi Gazzolo, was responsible for arranging the co-production partnership and became a member of Rainbow's board of directors. In addition to financing the television series, Viacom provided the resources necessary to produce a third Winx film. In 2019, Iginio Straffi commented on the two studios' near-decade of continued work together, saying that "the know-how of Rainbow and the know-how of Nickelodeon are very complementary; the sensibilities of the Americans, with our European touch." Winx Club opened the opportunity for Nickelodeon and Rainbow to collaborate on more co-productions, including various pilots from 2014 onward and Club 57 in 2019.

==== Retooled eighth season ====
In the last ten years, the animation audience has skewed younger. Nowadays, it's very difficult to get a 10-year-old to watch cartoons ... when your target is 4-to-8, your story cannot have the same level of complexity as the beginning seasons of Winx, where we had a lot of layers ... The fans of the previous Winx Club say on social media that the new seasons are childish, but they don't know that we had to do that.

— Iginio Straffi in 2019

The eighth season of the series was not produced immediately after the seventh. It followed a multiple-year hiatus and was not made as a direct continuation of the previous season. At Iginio Straffi's decision, season 8 was heavily retooled to appeal to a preschool target audience.

For season 8, Rainbow's creative team restyled the characters to appear younger, hoping to increase the appeal toward preschoolers. The plot lines were simplified so that they could be understood by a younger audience. Most of the show's longtime crew members were not called back to work on this season, including art director Simone Borselli, who had designed the series' characters from season 1 to 7, and singer Elisa Rosselli, who had performed a majority of the songs. In another change from previous seasons, season 8 was the first since season 4 to be solely produced by Rainbow, with Nickelodeon's American team serving as consultants rather than directly overseeing the episodes. This was due to the broadcaster focusing on another co-production with Rainbow – Club 57. Season 8 was also the first-ever season without the involvement of Rai Fiction.

Straffi made the decision to shift the show's intended audience after years of gradually aiming toward a younger demographic. In a 2019 interview, he explained that decreasing viewership from older viewers and an increased audience of young children made this change a necessity. He elaborated that "the fans of the previous Winx Club say on social media that the new seasons are childish, but they don't know that we had to do that." Straffi stepped away from the series at this time and shifted his focus to live-action projects aimed at older audiences: Nickelodeon's Club 57 and Fate: The Winx Saga. Straffi explained that "the things we had to tone down [in season 8] have been emphasized in the live action–the relationships, the fights, the love stories." He added that he hoped that Fate will satisfy the "20-year-olds who still like to watch Winx."

== Production ==
=== Design ===
A character table for Flora by art director Simone Borselli

The series' visuals are a mix of Japanese anime and European elements, which Iginio Straffi calls "the trademark Rainbow style". The main characters' original designs were based on Straffi's own sketches. The main characters were modelled on celebrities popular at the turn of the 21st century. In a 2011 interview with IO Donna, Straffi stated that Britney Spears served as an inspiration for Bloom, Cameron Diaz for Stella, Jennifer Lopez for Flora, Pink for Tecna, Lucy Liu for Musa, and Beyoncé for Aisha.

Originally, the Winx were intended to wear the same casual outfits in every episode. For example, Bloom wears a blue crop top and blue bell-bottom pants, and Stella wears a green halter top with an orange skirt. The characters wore these same main outfits throughout the first two seasons, but new outfits were designed as the series' budget increased. When the franchise was rebooted as Winx Club: The Magic Is Back, the characters' outfits were inspired by the original main outfits from seasons 1–2. Simone Borselli, the series' art director, designed most of the characters' clothing.

=== Writing and animation ===
The first step in the production of an episode was writing the script, which took around 5–6 months per script. When the series began production, the writers were based in Italy. After Viacom became a co-owner of Rainbow in 2011, the Italian writers began collaborating with Viacom's American writers. This international collaboration, which continued through 2019, aimed to make the show more multicultural and relatable to worldwide viewers. Episodes were written with two stories in mind: a longer story arc that spans many episodes, and a shorter subplot that wraps up within one 22-minute episode. This format was inspired by teen dramas and American comics. Themes written into the series include romance, growing up, and (in the fifth season) nature conservation.

After the script and character designs have been approved, the screenplay is passed onto a group of storyboard artists. For each 22-minute episode, the artists prepare 450 pages of storyboards which are used to assemble an animatic. At this stage, dialogue and music are added to determine the length of each scene. In the original series (seasons 1–4), the characters' mouths were animated to match the Italian voice actors' lines; in the revived series, the mouth movements were matched to the English scripts. Episodes are worked on concurrently because each requires around two years of work to complete.

At the beginning of the first season, the production team worked from Rainbow's original headquarters in Recanati, Italy. In 2006, Straffi opened a second studio in Rome for computer-animated projects. During the fifth and sixth seasons, 3D CGI sequences were incorporated into the series for the first time, animated at the studio in Rome. According to the Rainbow CGI animators, the animation of the characters' hair in underwater scenes was particularly difficult, and it was animated separately from the characters.

=== Casting ===
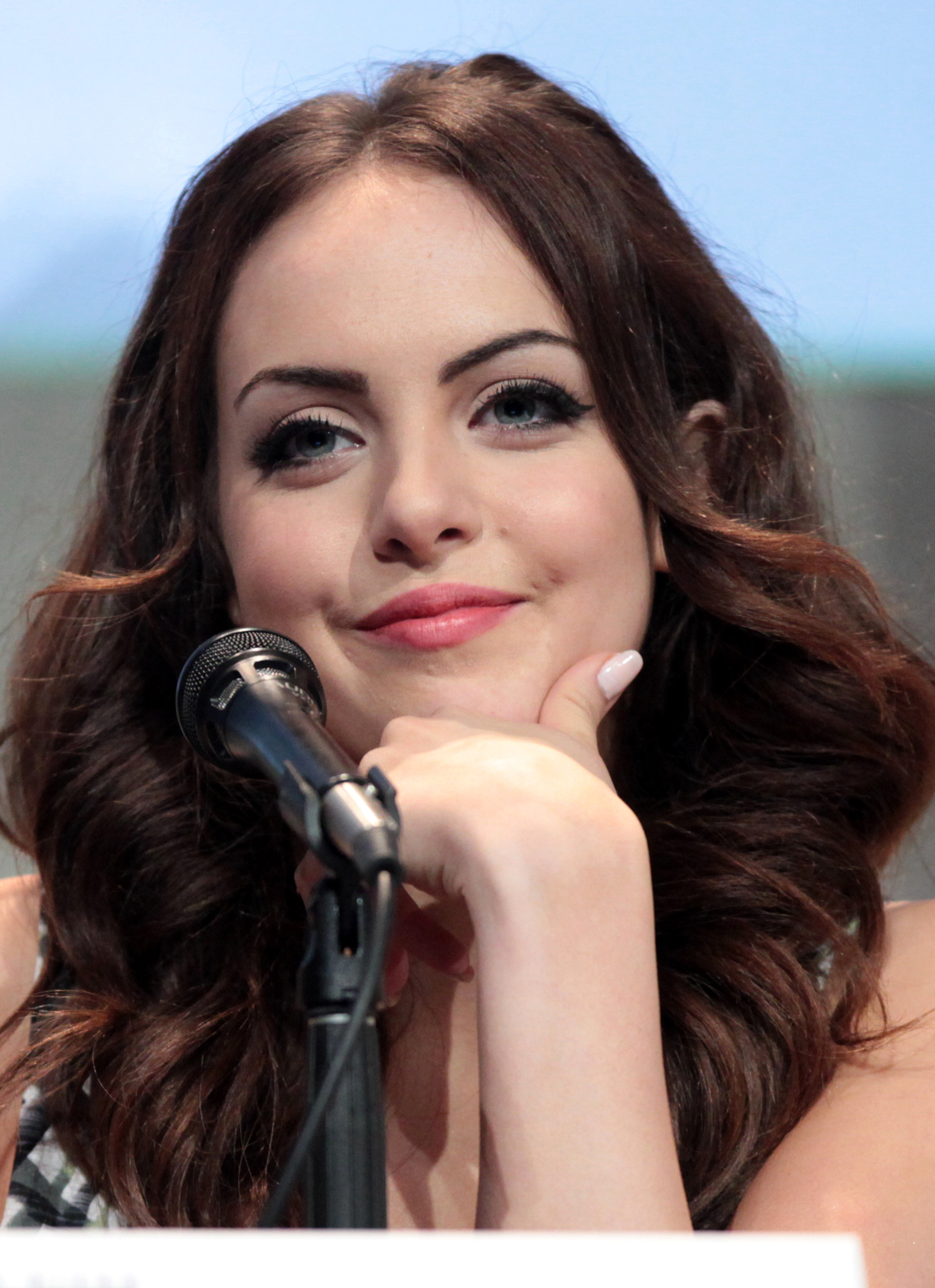
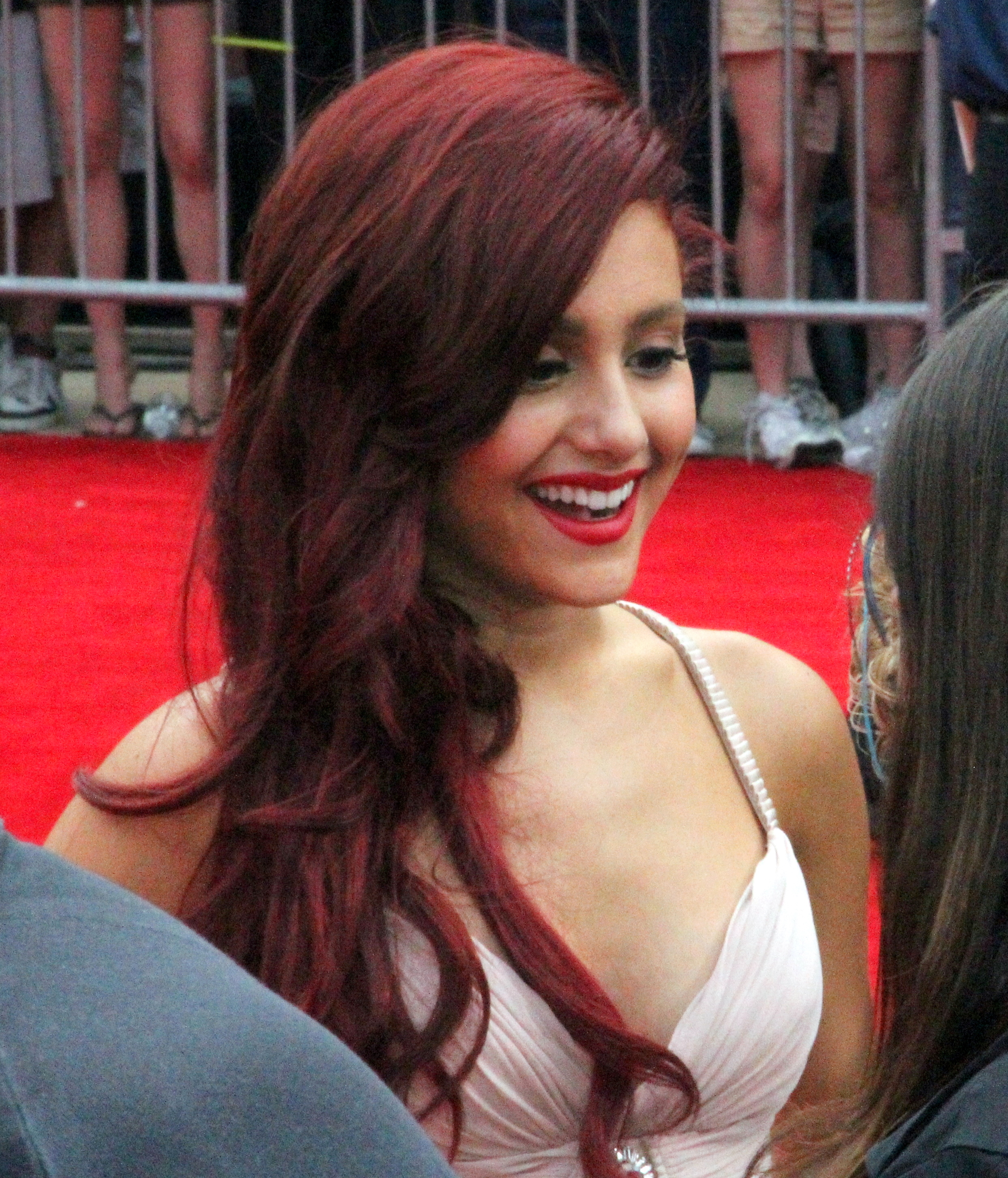
Nickelodeon stars Liz Gillies and Ariana Grande voiced Daphne and Diaspro, respectively.

In Italy, the series' voice actors include Letizia Ciampa (Bloom), Perla Liberatori (Stella), Ilaria Latini (Flora), Domitilla D'Amico (Tecna), Gemma Donati (Musa), and Laura Lenghi (Aisha). According to Ilaria Latini, the characters were cast before the character designs were finalized and the actors were shown black-and-white sketches of their roles. The actors record their lines in Rome. Seasons 1–4 were animated to match the Italian voices. From season 5 to 7, the animation was synchronized to match the English scripts.

The 2011 specials introduced a new cast of Hollywood voice actors. Iginio Straffi himself helped to choose the voices of the main characters, and the actors recorded their lines at the Atlas Oceanic studio in Burbank, California. Molly Quinn voiced the lead role of Bloom, and at first, she tried out a cartoony voice for her character. Nickelodeon advised her to use her real voice instead, saying, "No, we want voices of real girls this time around."

For the 2011 cast, Viacom hired popular actors whose names were advertised on-air to attract American viewers; these stars included Ariana Grande as Diaspro, Elizabeth Gillies as Daphne, Keke Palmer as Aisha, Matt Shively as Sky, and Daniella Monet as Mitzi. These actors provided voices for the first two Winx films and seasons three through six. In 2014, Viacom relocated the series' English cast to DuArt in New York City; this was done as a cost-cutting and time-saving measure since Rainbow was undergoing a significant financial loss at the time. Despite the change in voice actors, the series' animation continued to be matched to Nickelodeon and Rainbow's English scripts for the seventh season.

=== Music ===
Original songs have been recorded in about 40 languages for the show. Frequent composers for the programme include Angelo Poggi, Giovanni Cera, Michele Bettali, Stefano Carrara, Fabrizio Castania, and Maurizio D'Aniello. One of Nickelodeon's composers, Emmy and Grammy Award recipient Peter Zizzo, joined the team during Nickelodeon's joint production of the fifth season. His music is featured in the fifth, sixth, and seventh seasons. Each song takes between five and twelve months to complete. Many of the show's tracks are performed by Italian singers Lucia Miccinilli and Elisa Rosselli, who started recording songs for Winx in 2004 and 2007. Rosselli continued to produce music for the show (usually in collaboration with D'Aniello or Peter Zizzo from Nickelodeon) until its seventh season.

Nickelodeon created a few live-action music videos for Winx Club that were performed by stars from other Nick shows. One featured Elizabeth Gillies from Victorious (who also voiced Bloom's sister, Daphne) singing "We Are Believix." This song was released as a stand-alone single on iTunes. Another music video featured Cymphonique Miller from How to Rock singing "Winx, You're Magic Now." Miller also did a live performance of her Winx song at Nickelodeon's upfront presentation in Las Vegas.

== Broadcast ==
Winx Club first premiered on the Italian television channel Rai 2 on 28 January 2004. Reruns later aired on Rai Gulp, a sister channel to Rai 2 aimed at older children, shortly after the network launched in 2007.

By 2014, the show had been aired in over 150 countries. In 2019, after the Viacom-CBS merger announcement, Informa's Television Business International listed the show among the most important Viacom properties internationally.

In June 2022, Paramount (the rebranded name of ViacomCBS) launched a 24-hour Winx Club channel on their Pluto TV on-demand service. The channel is currently only available on the Spanish and French feeds.

=== Revival series ===
On 2 September 2010, Nickelodeon announced through a press release that they would be producing brand-new seasons with Rainbow. Nickelodeon debuted four one-hour specials (also co-produced with Rainbow) summarizing the first two seasons, the first of which premiered on their flagship American channel on 27 June 2011. With the exception of Italy, the fifth, sixth, and seventh seasons launched on Nickelodeon channels domestically and internationally.

During the sixth season in 2014, episode premieres were moved from Rai 2 to Rai Gulp in Italy, and from Nickelodeon to the Nick Jr. Channel in the United States. The change to younger-skewing networks followed Rainbow's lowering of Winx Club's target demographic to a younger audience than the earlier seasons. The seventh season was jointly announced by Nickelodeon and Rainbow in April 2014 as part of their continuing partnership. The seventh season made its world premiere on Nickelodeon Greece on 24 May 2015, and the English version debuted on Nickelodeon Asia on 22 June 2015. It later premiered on Rai Gulp in Italy (21 September 2015) and the Nick Jr. Channel in the United States (10 January 2016).

=== 4Kids edit ===
In October 2003, 4Kids Entertainment acquired U.S. broadcast rights to the first season of Winx Club for broadcast on their FoxBox (later 4Kids TV) strand on Fox. 4Kids Productions dubbed the first three seasons, censoring and editing the original content in an attempt at localisation. Iginio Straffi criticized these adjustments in a 2008 interview, saying, "The Winx fairies cannot even talk about boys there. I think this removes something essential." The series last aired on The CW (as part of The CW4Kids) before 4Kids' broadcast agreement was permanently revoked by Rainbow in 2009.

== Reception ==
=== Ratings ===
Upon its debut, Winx Club was a ratings success. During its first season in 2004, the series became one of the highest-rated programs on Rai 2 with an average audience share of 17%. Among viewers 4–14 years old, the average share was 45%. In France and Belgium, the season reached a 56% share among 10 to 14-year-olds. According to Rai in 2009, the gender mix of Winx Club's audience was nearly equal across the first three seasons; in the target demographic of 4–14 years of age, females represented only 3% more of the audience than males. The premiere of the fourth season set a record for an animated show's audience on Rai 2 with 500,000 viewers. In 2007, Iginio Straffi noted that there were lower ratings in English-speaking territories than in Europe at the time, which he surmised was due to cultural differences.

On 27 June 2011, the first special produced with Nickelodeon premiered on Nick U.S. to 2.278 million viewers. Each of the following three specials performed better than the previous ones, with the fourth ("The Shadow Phoenix") rating #1 in its time slot among viewers aged 2–11. During the first quarter of 2012, an average of 38.5 million viewers watched the series across nine of Nickelodeon's international outlets, a 60% increase from the fourth quarter of 2011. On Nickelodeon UK, Winx Club increased the network's ratings by 58% on its launch weekend in September 2011, ranking as the second-most-popular program on the channel and the most popular show with females aged 7–15. As of 2021, Winx Club is still broadcast daily on Nickelodeon UK's main network.

=== Critical response ===
In a New York Times article, Bocconi University professor Paola Dubini stated that the themes and characters of Winx Club appealed to both the target audience and their parents. Dubini wrote that the fairies' "defined and different personalities" made them relatable to viewers. Common Sense Media reviewer Tara Swords gave the show a three-star review, calling it "an imaginative story with bold, take-charge heroines" while also arguing that the show is hindered by its design elements.

Winx Club has attracted academic interest for its presentation of gender roles. In the journal of Volgograd State University, Russian sociologists Georgiy Antonov and Elena Laktyukhina judged that female characters in the series are depicted as dominant, while males are shown to be passive. As examples of women adopting traditionally male roles, they listed the female fairies fighting for their boyfriends, saving them from enemies, and inviting them on dates, while at the same time having difficulty performing household duties like cooking and cleaning. Writing for Kabardino-Balkarian State University, Zalina Dokhova and Tatiana Cheprakova stated that the series conveys "both positive and negative stereotypes", citing the opposite personalities of Stella and Aisha. They wrote that Stella's character incorporates stereotypically feminine passions for shopping and clothes, while Aisha represents a more realistic character with an interest in male-dominated sports.

Rhodes University professor Jeanne Prinsloo wrote in 2014 that Winx Club episodes "present complex narratives with active female protagonists and positive relationships that validate 'girl power'". In an interview with the newspaper Corriere della Sera, psychotherapist Gianna Schelotto highlighted positive aspects of the show, like friendship, guiding female viewers "away from supermodels to which the commercial world drags them". Il Sole 24 Ore also wrote positively about the show's feminist themes, commending how the characters "expose narcissistic masculinity".

The characters' outfits caused some controversy in June 2017, when the Pakistan Electronic Media Regulatory Authority (PEMRA) fined Nickelodeon's Pakistani channel after it aired an episode where the Winx are shown in swimsuits.

=== Cultural impact ===
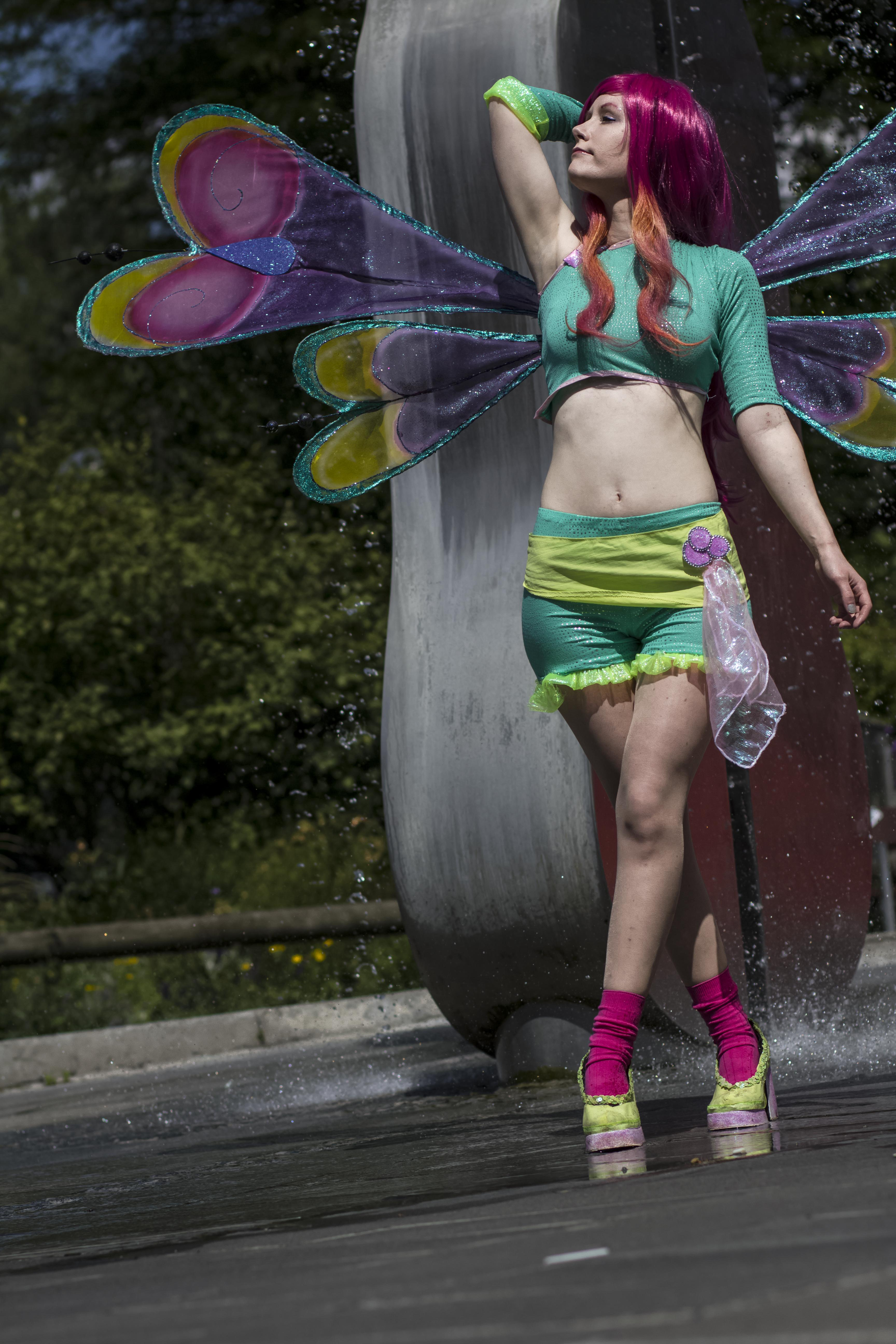
Cosplay of the character Roxy in 2014

Winx Club has been popular at fan conventions. For example, in 2012 and 2013, the series had a large presence at Nickelodeon's San Diego Comic-Con booth, where new collectibles were raffled off to fans. Nickelodeon made two exclusive dolls for the 2012 event (a silver Bloom and a gold Bloom) and two more for 2013 (Daphne in her nymph form and Bloom in her Harmonix form). In 2015, a four-day Winx Club fan gathering was held in Jesolo, where Nickelodeon installed a "Fan Wall" to display messages from worldwide fans. In October 2018, an exhibition for the series' fifteenth anniversary was held at Europe's largest comics festival, the Lucca Comics & Games convention in Tuscany.

Federico Vercellino of Il Sole 24 Ore described the series as "a destructive and constructive phenomenon" that introduced viewers to feminist stories about rebellious female characters. A 2019 study conducted for the Corriere della Sera reported that Winx Club was the fourth-most-popular Italian series outside of the country, with strong demand in Russia and the United States.

In 2018, Giovanna Gallo of Cosmopolitan stated that the program's characters have become "real icons of fashion" and noted the show's popularity with cosplayers, performance artists who wear costumes and accessories to represent the show's characters. Winx Club costumes were the focus of a second-season episode of The Apprentice, in which Flavio Briatore challenged the show's teams to create three Winx outfits intended for females 25–35 years of age, which were to be submitted to the judgment of Iginio Straffi. La Repubblica's Marina Amaduzzi attributed the popularity of Winx-inspired fashion to fans' desire to emulate the characters, stating that "Winx fanatics dress, move and breathe like their heroines".

The Regional Council of Marche, Italy, chose the Winx Club fairies to represent Marche and Italy at the Expo 2010 world's fair in Shanghai. A four-minute video using stereoscopic technology showing the Winx in Marche's tourist destinations was animated for the Italian Pavilion. In 2015, Italian Prime Minister Matteo Renzi visited Rainbow's studio and wrote that "the Winx are a beautiful story of Italian talent".

== Lawsuit ==
In April 2004, The Walt Disney Company filed an unsuccessful trademark infringement lawsuit against Rainbow. The company accused Rainbow of copying the Winx Club concept from its W.I.T.C.H. comic book, which was published over a year after production on Winx Club began. Disney applied for an injunction order to halt the further release of the Winx Club series and comic magazine; to declare the Winx Club trademark invalid; and to seize the periodical and film material bearing the allegedly infringing Winx Club name. Rainbow won the case against Disney, and the judge declared there were no confusing similarities between the two. Straffi mentioned that the Winx Club pilot entered production by 2000, while the W.I.T.C.H. comic was not released until May 2001. On 2 August 2004, all of Disney's infringement claims were rejected by the Tribunale di Bologna's Specialized Commercial Matters Department, which deemed them unfounded. The suit later became the subject of a commercial law seminar at the University of Macerata in 2009.

In 2005, Iginio Straffi was interviewed in IO Donna about the legal battle. He was asked how it felt "to be one of Disney's most hated people," and answered that he – as the founder of a small animation studio – was glad to have "defeated" a massive conglomerate. "I feel a certain pride in having annoyed such a giant. It's inspiring," he elaborated. As a result of the lawsuit, Straffi has avoided doing any business with the Disney corporation; he commented in 2014, "They've lost the chance to explore our creativity."

== Related media ==
=== Films ===
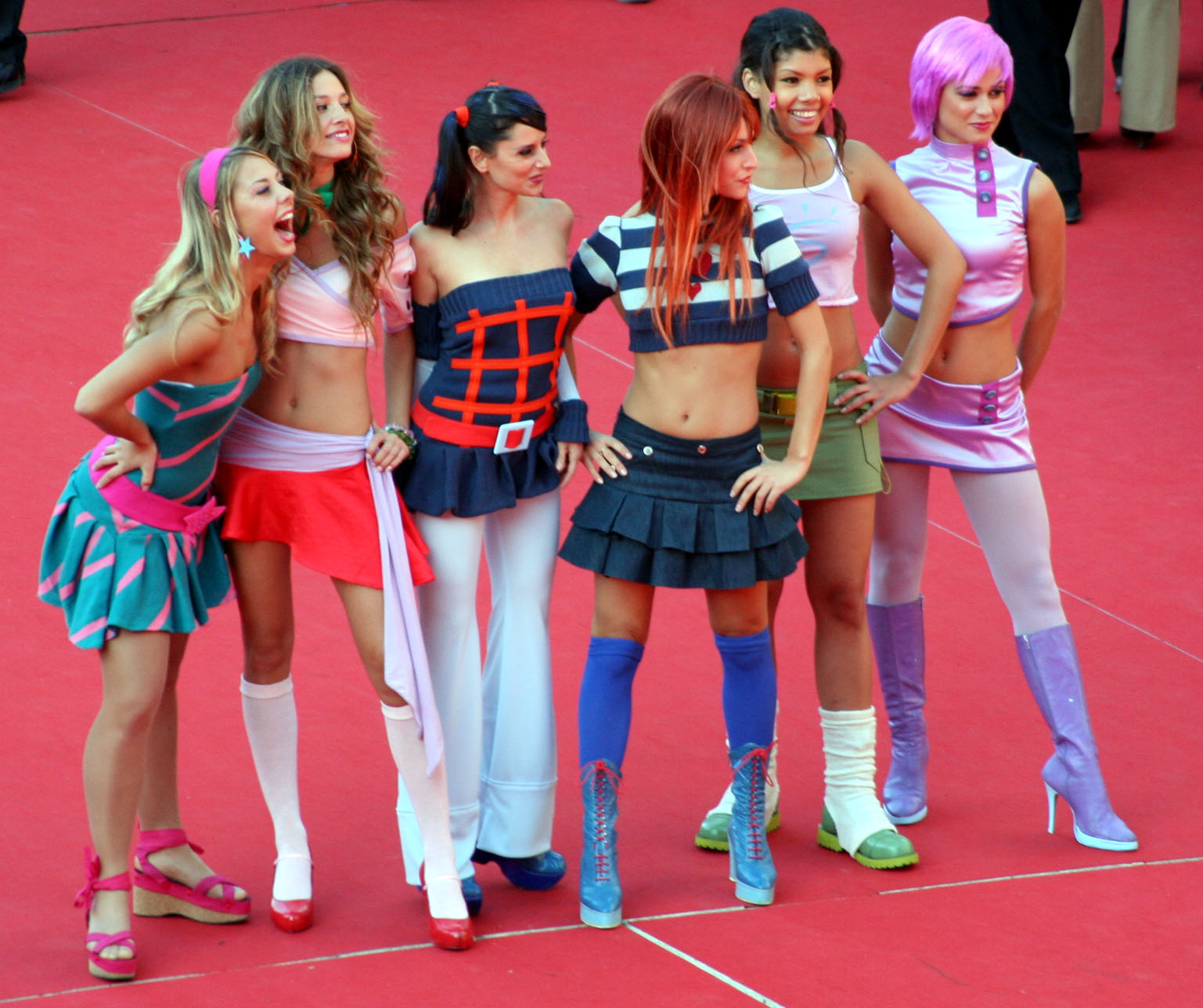
Dancers portraying the Winx Club attend the Rome Film Fest premiere of The Secret of the Lost Kingdom

==== The Secret of the Lost Kingdom ====
On 8 October 2006, a Winx Club feature film was announced on Rainbow's website. The Secret of the Lost Kingdom was released in Italy on 30 November 2007. Its television premiere was on 11 March 2012 on Nickelodeon in the United States. The plot takes place after the events of the first three seasons, following Bloom as she searches for her birth parents and fights the Ancestral Witches who destroyed her home planet. Iginio Straffi had planned this feature-length story since the beginning of the series' development.

==== Magical Adventure ====
On 9 November 2009, a sequel film was announced. Winx Club 3D: Magical Adventure was released in Italy on 29 October 2010. Its television premiere was on 20 May 2013, on Nickelodeon in the United States. In the film, Sky proposes to Bloom, but Sky's father does not approve of their marriage. Production on Magical Adventure began in 2007, while the first film was still in development. It is the first Italian film animated in stereoscopic 3D.

On 19 February 2013, Nickelodeon held a special screening of the movie at the Grauman's Chinese Theatre in Hollywood. Nickelodeon star Daniella Monet (who voiced Bloom's rival, Mitzi, on the show) and creator Iginio Straffi both attended the premiere.

==== The Mystery of the Abyss ====
In late 2010, it was announced that Viacom (the owner of Nickelodeon and eventual co-owner of Rainbow) would provide the resources necessary to produce a new Winx film. The film, titled Winx Club: The Mystery of the Abyss, was released in Italy on 4 September 2014. It made its television premiere on Nickelodeon Germany on 8 August 2015. The plot follows the Winx venturing through the Infinite Ocean to rescue Sky, who has been imprisoned by the Trix. According to Iginio Straffi, the film has a more comedic tone than the previous two films.

=== Spin-offs ===
PopPixie is a miniseries that ran for a single season over two months in 2011. It features chibi-inspired Pixie characters who were first introduced in the second season of Winx Club. After Nickelodeon became a co-developer of the main series, it was announced that PopPixie would air on Nickelodeon's global network of channels beginning in late 2011.

World of Winx is a spin-off series that premiered in 2016. Straffi described it as one "with more adult graphics, a kind of story better suited to an older audience" than the original series. It features the Winx travelling to Earth on an undercover mission to track down a kidnapper known as the Talent Thief. 26 episodes over two seasons were made.

=== Netflix live-action adaptation ===
In 2018, a live-action adaptation aimed at young adults was announced. Filming began in September 2019, with Abigail Cowen starring as Bloom. The series made its world premiere on 22 January 2021, following a teaser released on 10 December 2020. In February 2021, the series was renewed for a second season, which was released on 16 September 2022. In November 2022, the series was canceled after two seasons.

The writers of Fate: The Winx Saga were entirely new to the Winx franchise, and they were recruited from teen dramas like The Vampire Diaries. Early in production, Nickelodeon's American crew members from the cartoon (including Bloom's voice actress, Molly Quinn) met with the Fate production team and reviewed the pilot script. Rainbow's Joanne Lee, Straffi's wife, also oversaw the show as an executive producer.

=== Live-action movie ===
In November 2022, Iginio Straffi announced that, along with the reboot of the animated series, a new live-action film was in development.

=== Reboot animated series ===
On November 6, 2022, creator Iginio Straffi announced that "a brand new CG Winx animated series reboot is going into production. Yes, a reboot." In January 2023, Paramount (Viacom) sold its stake in Rainbow back to Straffi, allowing him full creative control of the reboot. In May 2024, it was announced that Netflix will be in charge of broadcasting the episodes.

=== Other live events ===
In September 2005, a live stage musical called "Winx Power Show" began touring in Italy. The musical later expanded to other European countries and the show's cast performed at the 2007 Nickelodeon Kids' Choice Awards in Milan. An ice show follow-up starring Carolina Kostner was launched in November 2008. In October 2012, Nickelodeon held a live event at the Odeon Cinema Covent Garden, complete with a "pink carpet" and previews of upcoming episodes.

=== Merchandise ===
Iginio Straffi opened up to licensing Winx Club merchandise in order to finance his studio's other projects; in 2008, he stated that he reinvests "almost everything" back into Rainbow. Across the show's first ten years on air, more than 6,000 pieces of tie-in merchandise were released by external licensing companies. As of 2014, Winx Club merchandise licenses generated around €50 million annually, with most of the revenue going towards product licensees rather than Rainbow itself. According to a VideoAge International article, Rainbow's take from merchandise sales averages 10%, with some deals only giving the studio 5%.

After Viacom became a co-owner of Rainbow in 2011, Nickelodeon & Viacom Consumer Products started to create merchandise for the show. From 2011 to 2013, Nickelodeon spent US$100 million on a Winx Club marketing campaign to promote both the show and the tie-in products. Nickelodeon partnered with Jakks Pacific to design dolls based on new episodes, and in the United Kingdom, the merchandise sold out before those episodes had even premiered. Nickelodeon's vice president of consumer products, Michael Connolly, said that "Winx has been a huge surprise, considering the programme is not on free-to-air in the UK. We put toys in Argos [stores] and in just three days we experienced sales for a doll range unlike we've seen."

An ongoing comic book series has been published since the series' premiere. Over 210 Italian issues have been released as of 2021. In the United States, Viz Media translated a few of the first 88 issues and released them across nine volumes. Other tie-in books have been produced, starting with character guides distributed by Giunti Editore. In 2012, Nickelodeon partnered with Random House to publish Winx Club books in English.

=== Games ===
Several video games based on the show have been made, with some exclusive to Europe. The first game was Konami Europe's Winx Club in 2005. In 2012, Nickelodeon launched Winx Club: Magical Fairy Party for the Nintendo DS in both the United States and Europe. The Nickelodeon game was notable for being one of very few Nintendo DS titles to be played sideways, with the game system held like a book. A physical trading card game based on the franchise and produced by Upper Deck Entertainment was released in 2005.

Nickelodeon's website, Nick.com, created various Flash games based on the show. The Winx Club section on Nick.com became one of the most-visited pages on the site, with 1 million monthly visitors in mid-2013 and over 2.6 million gaming sessions.

List of Winx Club video games for consoles

Year	Titles	Developer	Publisher	Platforms	Ref
2005	Winx Club	DC Studios	Konami Europe	Game Boy Advance	
2006	Winx Club	DC Studios	Konami Europe	Windows; PlayStation 2	
2006	Winx Club: Quest for the Codex	Powerhead Games	Konami Europe	Game Boy Advance; Nintendo DS	
2007	Winx Club: Join the Club	n-Space	Konami Europe	PlayStation Portable	
2008	Winx Club: Mission Enchantix	Powerhead Games	Konami Europe	Nintendo DS	
2009	Winx Club: Secret Diary 2009	Team 3 Games Ltd	Konami Europe	Nintendo DS	
2009	Dance Dance Revolution Winx Club	Bemani	Konami Europe	Wii	
2009	Winx Club: Your Magic Universe	Powerhead Games	Konami Europe	Nintendo DS	
2010	Winx Club: Believix in You	ForwardGames Productions	Rainbow S.p.A.	Nintendo DS	
2010	Winx Club: Rockstars	RIZ Inc.	Rainbow S.p.A.	Nintendo DS	
2012	Winx Club: Magical Fairy Party	1st Playable Productions	D3 Publisher, Namco Bandai Games	Nintendo DS	
2014	Winx Club: Saving Alfea	1st Playable Productions	Little Orbit	Nintendo DS; Nintendo 3DS	
2017	Winx Club: Alfea Butterflix Adventures	EM Studios	Tsumanga Studios	Xbox One; Xbox Series	
