= Amit Gicelter =

Israeli film producer (born 1981)

- עמית גיסלטר
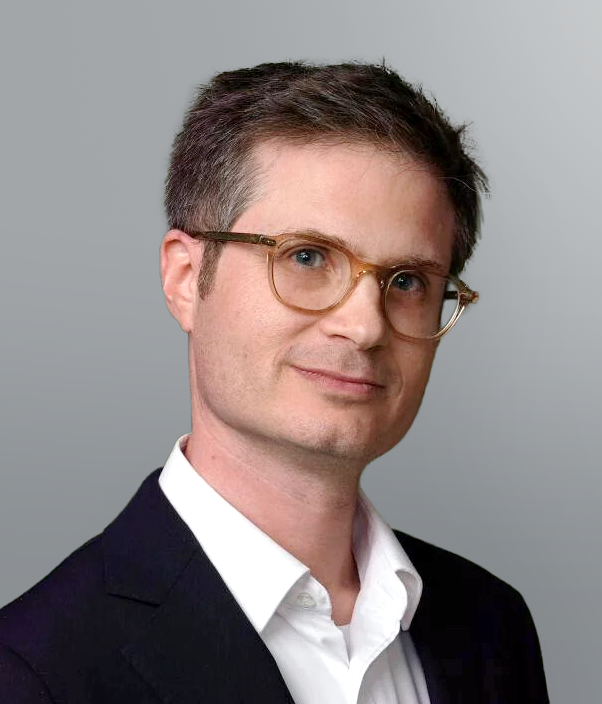
- Born: April 25, 1981 (age 45); Jerusalem
- Citizenship: Israeli; British
- Education: Bezalel Academy of Arts and Design
- Occupation: Animation producer
- Known for: Letter to a Pig; Black Slide; Broken Branches; Pisces; Swimming With Wings

Amit Russell Gicelter (Hebrew: עמית רוסל גיסלטר) is an Oscar-nominated animation producer from Israel, founder of The Hive Studio, an Israeli animation studio based in Tel Aviv, Jerusalem and Sderot. He is mostly known for producing the animated series The Fenestas (2023) and Summer Memories (2022), and the award-winning films Black Slide (2021) and Letter to a Pig (2022), winner of the Ophir Award at the Israel Academy Awards. He is a member of The Academy of Motion Picture Arts and Sciences since June 2024.

== Career ==
Gicelter studied at the University of Westminster (London, England), where he graduated with a bachelor's degree in film & animation in 2007. After graduation, Gicelter pursued a career as a freelance producer for advertising agencies in the UK, before returning to Israel, where he founded the Tel Aviv-based animation studio The Hive Studio in 2010.

Gicelter has been involved in several initiatives to develop and support the animation industry in Israel, and promoting Israeli animation internationally. In 2021, he signed the first ever co-production agreement between the United Emirates and Israel, on the animated series Crab & Cake. He also served as an associate producer on the first ever serial co-production between Israel and Canada, Summer Memories (2022) In 2022, he initiated the West Negev Animation (WNA) initiative, to encourage animation production services in the south of Israel.

== Filmography ==
=== Films ===
- 2014: Broken Branches (Documentary short) - Producer. Directed by Ayala Sharot.
- 2018: Guide de Jardinage (Documentary short) - Producer. Directed by Sarah Jane Hatooka
- 2021: Fledge (Short film) - Producer. Directed by Hani Dombe and Tom Kouris.
- 2021: Black Slide (Short film) - Producer. Directed by Uri Lotan.
- 2022: Letter to a Pig (Short film) - Producer. Directed by Tal Kantor.
- 2022: Pisces (Short film) - Producer. Directed by Lee Dror.
- 2022: Swimming With Wings (Short film) - Co-Producer. Directed by Daphna Awadish.
- 2024: Butterfly Kiss – Co-Producer. Directed by Zohar Dvir.

=== TV Series ===
- 2019: Discovering Sounds with Luli - Director and producer.
- 2021: Parpar Nechmad - Animated segmants producer.
- 2022: Summer Memories - Associate Producer.
- 2022-23: Kol Hator (web series) - Producer.
- 2023: The Fenestas (web series) - Producer.

== Recognition ==
In 2022, Gicelter was shortlisted to the 95th Academy Awards and nominated to the Annie Awards for the short film Black Slide (2021).

In 2022, he won the Ophir Award at the Israel Academy Awards and was nominated for the 96th Academy Awards on the 23rd of January 2024 with the short film Letter to a Pig (2022).
