= The Hive (animation studio) =

Israeli animation studio

- Type: Animation studio
- Industry: Animation
- Founded: 2010; 16 years ago
- Founders: Amit Gicelter
- Headquarters: Tel Aviv, Jerusalem, Sderot, Israel; Athens, Greece
- Website: thehivepro.com

The Hive Studio is an animation production company based in Israel and Greece. Founded in Tel Aviv in 2010 by producer Amit Gicelter, the studio has produced original animated works including short films, web series and television series, in addition to contributing to numerous projects in entertainment, advertising, and explainer videos.

It was nominated for the Academy Award for Best Animated Short Film at the 96th Academy Awards for Letter to a Pig, and had been shortlisted the previous year for its short film Black Slide.

== Partial filmography ==
Year	Title	Format	Personal	Notes
2025–present	The Normal Mfer	Adult animated web series	Co-production: CC0 Studios	
2024	Crayola's Scribble Scrubbie Pets	CGI animated Web Series (4x2.5 min)	Commissioned by Crayola; Co-production: Driver Productions (USA)	
2024	Butterfly Kiss	CGI animated Short Film (7 min)	Director: Zohar Dvir; Co-production: Fabian&Fred (Germany)	Nominated for 2025 Ophir Award
2024	Taste of Heaven	2D animated Short Film (6 min)	Director: Isaac Sverdlov	
2024	Exploring Israel	2D animated Web Series (6x7 min)	Commissioned by OpenDor Media	
2023	Pisces	2D animated Short Film (12 min)	Director: Lee Dror|	
2023	Swimming With Wings	2D animated Short Film (8 min)	Director: Daphna Awadish; Co-production: Valk Productions (Netherlands)	
2021–2023	Parpar Nechmad (The Nice Butterfly)	Live-action series with animated inserts (60x15 min)	Commissioned by Kan, Israeli Public Broadcasting Corporation	
2023	Kol Hator	Live-action web series (54x13 min)	Commissioned by Kan	
2023	The Fenestas	Toon Boom Harmony animated web series (6x5 min)	Created by Shalev Ben Elya, Anan Gibson, Nadav Sheffer; Aired on Kan	
2022	Summer Memories	Television animated series (40x11 min)	Director: Adam Yaniv; Commissioned by Aircraft Pictures, Yeti Farm Creative, A&N Productions (Canada, USA, Israel)	Distributed by WildBrain; Premiered on Family Channel (Canada)
2022	Letter to a Pig	2D animated Short Film (16 min)	Director: Tal Kantor; Co-production: MIYU Productions (France)	Academy Award Nominee (2024); Winner of Ophir Award for Best Short Film (2022)
2021	Black Slide	3D animated Short Film (10 min)	Director: Uri Lotan; Co-production: FlipBook Studio (UK)	Academy Award Shortlist (2023); Winner at British Animation Awards, Indy Shorts Festival, Chilemonos Festival; Annie Award Nominee
2021	Fledge	Stop-motion animated short film (14 min)	Directors: Tom and Hani	
2021	Zombees	2D animated Tween Series POC (11 min)	Commissioned by Pocket.watch (USA)	
2021	MisPrints	2D animated Tween Series POC (2 min)	Commissioned by Pocket.watch (USA)	
2020	Crab & Cake	Pilot episode for animated series (5 min)	Co-produced with Blink Studios (UAE)	
2019	Sheryl Holmes & The Kid Detectives	3D Preschool series pilot	Co-Created with Eran B.Y.; Funded by Makor Foundation, development supported by Jerusalem Film Fund	
2019	Discovering Sounds with Luli	2D animated TV Series (15x7 min)	Commissioned by Hop! Channel (Israel)	Part of multilingual "Luli TV"
2018	Guide de Jardinage	2D animated Short Film (10 min)	Director: Sarah Jane Hatooka; Co-production: Les Films de l'Arlequin (France)	
2014	Broken Branches	Mixed-media animated documentary (25 min)	Won Pulcinella Award	

== See also ==
- Cinema of Israel
- List of animated feature films
- Academy Award for Best Animated Short Film
- Ophir Award
