= The Normal Mfer =

Adult animated web series

- Genre: Adult animation; Cringe comedy; Comedy drama
- Created by: Alex Orrelle; lawl
- Based on: Mfer World by lawl
- Voices of: Charlie Curtis-Beard; Emma Steiger; Rick Zieff
- Composer: Nati Zeidenstadt
- Countries of origin: United States; Israel
- Original language: English
- No. of seasons: 1
- No. of episodes: 10

Production
- Executive producer: Alex Orrelle
- Producer: Amit Gicelter
- Editor: Daniel Shanni
- Running time: 10–12 minutes
- Production companies: CC0 Studios; The Hive

Original release
- Network: YouTube
- Release: February 28, 2025 – present

The Normal Mfer is an adult animated web series created by Alex Orrelle and lawl for CC0 Studios and The Hive, based on a 2023 web series of the same name. The series premiered on YouTube.

== Episodes ==
| No. | Title | Directed by | Written by | Original release date |
|---|---|---|---|---|
| 1 | "Pilot" | Doron Meir | Jennifer Skelly | February 28, 2025 |
| 2 | "Freudian Ship" | Anan Gibson | Yotam Perel | June 16, 2025 |
| 3 | "Datezilla" | Mike Parker | Yotam Perel | August 29, 2025 |
| 4 | "Crossweird" | Mike Parker | Alexandra Shields | September 23, 2025 |
| 5 | "Shoot Your Shot" | Anan Gibson | Jennifer Skelly | October 16, 2025 |
| 6 | "Amy" | Yonatan Hayon | Vair Vurnbrand | November 18, 2025 |
| 7 | "Imposter" | Anan Gibson | Jennifer Skelly | April 15, 2026 |
| 8 | "Offline" | Yonatan Hayon | Yotam Perel | April 22, 2026 |
| 9 | "Simulated" | Alex Orelle and Yonatan Hayon | Ali Sheields | April 29, 2026 |
| 10 | "Homecoming" | Anan Gibson | Jennifer Skelly | May 6, 2026 |
