= Lee Dror =

Israeli film director and animator

- לי דרור
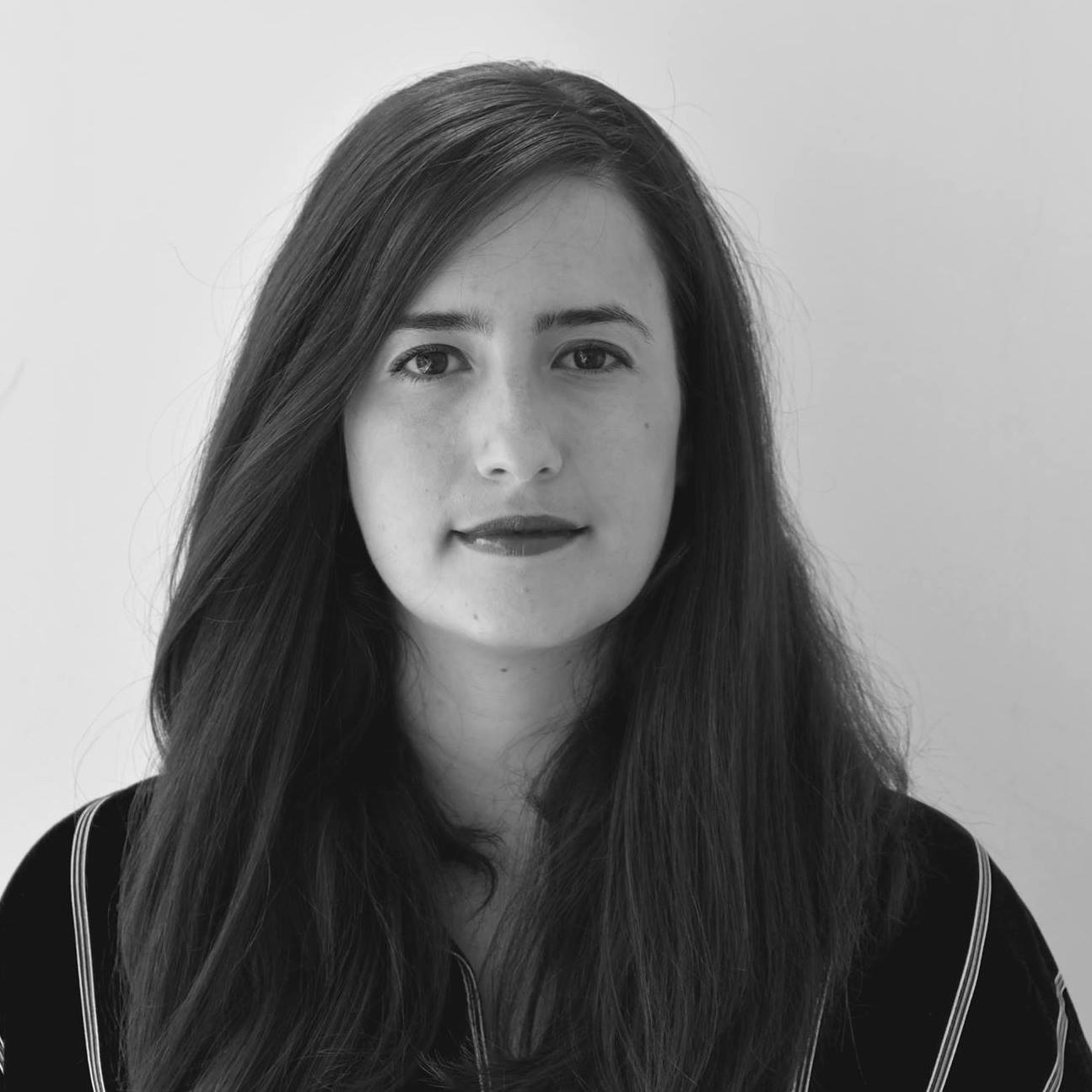
- Born: 15 January 1989 (age 37); Israel
- Education: Bezalel Academy of Arts and Design
- Occupations: Film director; Visual Artist
- Known for: Pisces; Mirrors
- Awards: Short Film Competition, Chaniartoon Festival

Lee Dror (Hebrew: לי דרור; born 1989) is an independent animation filmmaker and visual artist based in Tel Aviv, Israel.

Her artistic style blends traditional techniques with exploration of themes such as family, grief, belonging and femininity. She is a graduate of the Screen-Based Arts Department in Bezalel Academy of Arts and Design, where she earned her Bachelor degree of Fine Arts (B.F.A.).

== Recognition ==
Lee Dror has received recognition for her work in animation, the most recent of which is the inclusion of Pisces in the longlist for the 2024 Academy Awards in category of "Best Animated Short Film". Among her accolades are awards for Best Animation Short at Student Cuts, Best Short Film at the Festival di Cortometraggi-Sorsicorti, and special mentions at both the STIFF Student International Film Festival and Promofest Short of the Year. Her films have been featured in a multiple festivals, such as the Stuttgart ITFS Trickfilm Animation Festival, Krok Festival, and the Manchester Animation Festival.

== Filmography ==
=== Director ===
- Pisces (2023) – Currently in distribution; produced by Amit Gicelter and The Hive Studio, funded by the Jerusalem Film Fund, Pais Fund Israel, and Makor Fund; distributed by Pentacle Productions.
- It Was Only A Hand (2020) - Part of poetry slam animated collaboration with the "Incubator" fringe theater.
- Free Imagination (2017) – Part of “A Face. The Day. A Memory” by Beit Avi Chai Institute.
- Mirrors (2015) – Co-directed with Yali Herbet; funded by the NFCT Fund Israel.

=== Other work ===
- Summer Memories (2022–2023) - Layout and BG painter, location designer and color. Produced by A&N Productions Ltd in partnership with Aircraft Pictures, Yeti Farm Creative and The Hive Studio.
- Little pirates- For Good (2020) - Director and art director. Animated music video for the indie folk music band "Little Pirates". Produced and recorded by Ori Winokur At The Slick Studio.
- Rachel Bluwstein (2019) - Design and animation. Series of animated shorts as a tribute to Rachel the poetess. Produced by Tami Berenstein Studio.
- Days of the week (2018) - Director, animation and design. An educative animated video, produced by and for BabyFirst TV.
