= Pisces (film) =

2023 Israeli animated short film

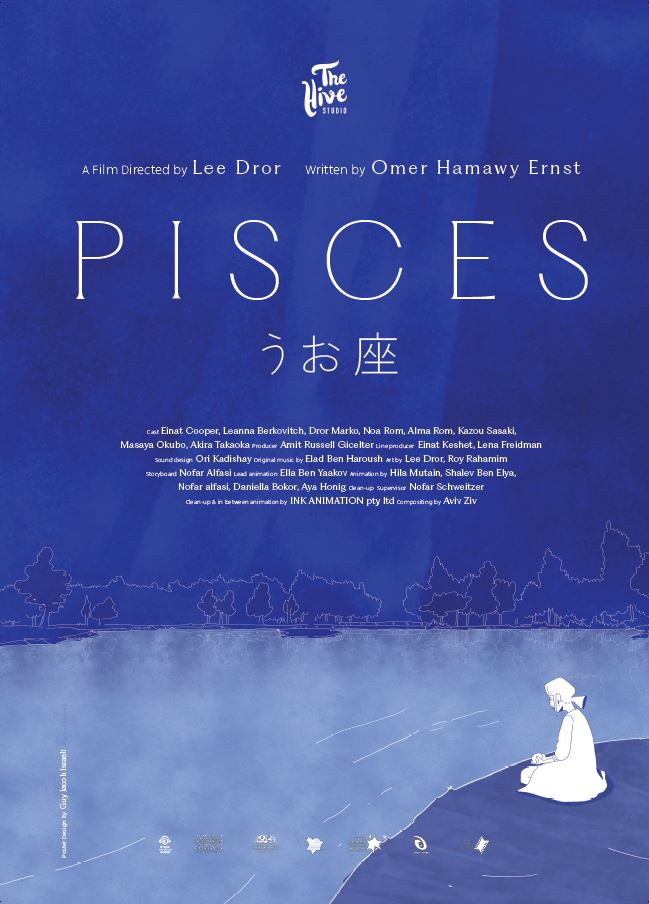
- Hebrew: מזל דגים
- Directed by: Lee Dror
- Written by: Omer Hamawy Ernst
- Produced by: Amit Russell Gicelter; Einat Keshet (Line Producer); Lena Freidman (Line Producer)
- Starring: Einat Cooper; Leana Berkovitch; Dror Marko; Akira Kataoka; Masaya Okubo; Oki Mikito; Kazuo Sasaki
- Music by: Elad Ben Harrousch (Composer); Mazkeka Studio (Sound Design)
- Production companies: The Hive Studio; Makor Foundation for Israeli Films (Financing); Mifal HaPais council for culture and arts (Financing); The Jerusalem Film Fund (Financing)
- Release date: October 2023
- Running time: 12 minutes
- Country: Israel
- Languages: Hebrew, Japanese

Pisces (Hebrew: מזל דגים) is a 2023 Israeli animated short film directed by Lee Dror and written by Omer Hamawi. The film explores themes of loss and denial, which Dror has previously inspected in her prior works, through its protagonist, Rona, who grapples with the impact of her sister's death while navigating her unconventional life in Japan.

== Synopsis ==
The narrative centers on Rona, whose life is upended when she receives a phone call from her father informing her of her sister's accidental death, a decade after she left her family in Israel. As she struggles to process this devastating news, Rona attempts to maintain her daily routine as a member of a "family for rent". Her efforts to deny her sister's death lead to a fracture in the fictional world she has constructed, forcing her to confront the unresolved absence in her life.

== Accolades ==
Since its release, Pisces has been showcased at numerous film festivals worldwide, including the Festival de Cinéma de la Ville in Québec and the Macau Shorts International Film Festival. Although Dror already gained international recognition with for her previous film, Mirrors, it was the first time she was longlisted for the Academy Awards, having earned a qualifying prize at a prestigious film festival or secured theatrical screening engagements recognized by the Academy.

The short film premiered at the Plum Festival in Argentina and received the Creativity Award at the Chaniartoon Festival in Greecel It has also been featured in the Animasyros International Animation Festival and the Lille International Short Film Festival, among others.

Year	Festivals	Award/Category	Status
2023	Chaniartoon Festival	Short Film Competition	Won
2023	Plum Festival	Short Film Competition	Nominated
2023	Festival de Cinéma de la Ville de Québec	"Illumination" section	Nominated
2023	Macau Shorts International Film Festival	Short Film Competition	Nominated
2023	Rencontres Audiovisuelles (Lille International Short Film Festival)	Short Film Competition	Nominated
2023	Animasyros International Animation Festival	International Panorama Short Film Category	Nominated
2023	Linz International Short Film Festival	Short Film Competition	Nominated
2023	Austin JFF	Short Film Competition	Nominated
2024	Bogoshorts	Short Film Competition	Nominated
2024	Toronto Jewish Film Festival	Short Film Competition	Nominated
2024	Jerusalem Film Festival	Short Film Competition	Nominated
