= Nickelodeon Animated Shorts Program =

Program for developing new series

Nickelodeon Animated Shorts Program is a variety project that was launched in 2012, where people make animated shorts at Nickelodeon Animation Studio, with the potential for them to become series for Nickelodeon and Nick Jr.. Since this project was launched, the short Breadwinners would later get a series in 2014. It would soon be followed by The Loud House in 2016, Tot Cop and Corn & Peg in 2019 and It’s Pony and Ollie’s Pack in 2020. Bug Salad, Moosebox and Sharkdog were all launched as short-form series in 2018 (with the latter getting a full-length series on Netflix 3 years later) while the short Summer Memories would get a full series from WildBrain in 2022.

After Brian Robbins became president of Nickelodeon, the Animated Shorts Program was succeeded by the Nickelodeon Intergalactic Shorts Program in 2019. The new program lasted for a single season and launched the Nickelodeon shows Rock Paper Scissors and Wylde Pak. However, the other Intergalactic Shorts Program shorts remain unreleased as of 2025.

== Nickelodeon shorts ==
=== 2012–2013 ===
Title	Created by	Status	Notes
Austin Oliver	Greg Worswick	Short	
Baby 'Stache	Gary Anthony Williams	Short	
Breadwinners	Steve Borst and Gary S. "Doodles" DiRaffaele	Series pickup (Full)	Second version of the pilot.
Cabrito and Chewy	Allan Jacobsen and Chuckles Austen	Short	
Carrot and Stick: "Sweet Rosie"	Derek Robert Iversen and Miles Hindman	Short	
Level 15	Wolf-Rüdiger Bloss	Short	
Lucas	Kyle Dunnigan	Short	
Marty's Exotic Animals	Andrew Friedman	Short	
Odyssey Squad!	Ben G. Adams	Short	
Pam & Sid's Port-a-Party	Annie Sertich and Mindy Sterling	Short	
Tallie Peer Counselor	Laura Sreebny	Short	
Wing Dings	T.J. Fuller	Short	
Zombie Brothers	Eric Robles	Short	

=== 2013–2014 ===
Title	Created by	Status	Notes
Badly Drawn Animals!	Hamish Steele	Short	One of the seven International pilot episodes included in this edition. Originally from the United Kingdom.
Bear Wrestler	Deanna Rooney	Short	
Broats	Jack Cusumano	Short	
Bug Salad	Carl Faruolo	Series pickup (Web shorts)	
By Request Pizza	Arica Tuesday and Morgana Ignis (credited as Mick Ignis)	Short	
Charlie and Mr. Two	Travis Braun	Short	
Earmouse and Bottle	Brian Morante	Short	
Hole	Sam Spina	Short	
The Loud House: "Bathroom Break!!"	Chris Savino	Series pickup (Full)	
Louis & Georges	Renaud Martin and Raphaël Chabassol	Short	One of the seven International pilot episodes included in this edition. Originally from France.
Matt & Gus: "Donut Disturb"	Matt Braunger	Short	
Monster Pack	Graham Peterson and Pedro Eboli	Series pickup (Full)	One of the seven International pilot episodes included in this edition. Originally from Brazil.
MooseBox	Mike Scott	Series pickup (Shorts)	One of the seven International pilot episodes included in this edition. Originally from South Africa.
Scoop!	The Brothers McLeod (Greg Mcleod and Myles Mcleod)	Short	One of the seven International pilot episodes included in this edition. Originally from the United Kingdom.
Tech Oddity	Marco Ibarra and Stefie Zöhrer	Short	One of the seven International pilot episodes included in this edition. Originally from Mexico.
Tonk's Island	Mel Roach	Short	One of the seven International pilot episodes included in this edition. Originally from Australia.
Woodstump!	Zach Smith	Short	

=== 2014–2015 ===
Title	Created by	Status	Notes
Bad Bad Bunny	Tarryn Henderson	Short	
Buck 'n Lou and the Night Crew	Caitlin Rose Boyle and Roan Everly (credited as Tara Helfer)	Short	
Crazy Block	Iginio Straffi	Short	One of the eight International pilot episodes included in this edition. Originally from Italy. Co-produced with Rainbow S.r.l. (partially owned by at the time by Nickelodeon's parent company Viacom)
The Cupcakery of Doom	Trevor Reece	Short	
DuckManBoy	Louis Hudson and Ian Ravenscroft	Short	One of the eight International pilot episodes included in this edition. Originally from the United Kingdom. Co-produced with Dice Productions.
Feebs and Mr. Timmins	Suren Perera	Short	One of the eight International pilot episodes included in this edition. Originally from Australia.
Francine	Katie Crown	Short	
Ice Station Zedonk	Tom Parkinson	Short	
Jo Minkus	Benjamin Anders	Short	One of the eight International pilot episodes included in this edition. Originally from Canada.
Magic Children Doing Things	Monty Ray	Short	Later developed at Disney Television Animation from 2021-2022 according to Monty Ray
Meat Pie vs. The Dark Ages	Gabe Swarr	Short	
Off the Shelf	Melody Iza (credited as Robert Iza)	Short	
The Outsiders	Eric Bravo	Short	
Planet Claire	Will McRobb and Chris Viscardi	Short	
Someplace Awesome	Eamonn O'Neill and Marah Curran	Short	One of the eight International pilot episodes included in this edition. Originally from Ireland.
Summer Memories	Adam Yaniv	Series pickup (Full)	
The Tall Tales of Urchin	Hamish Steele	Short	One of the eight International pilot episodes included in this edition. Originally from the United Kingdom. Co-produced with Blink Industries.
Ugly Mutt	Dave Hagen and Shadi Petosky	Short	
Werebeast	James Lancett	Short	One of the eight International pilot episodes included in this edition. Originally from the United Kingdom.
Woodchips	Christian Villacañas	Short	One of the eight International pilot episodes included in this edition. Originally from Spain.

=== 2015–2016 ===
Title	Created by	Status	Notes
A Boy and His Dude: "Dem Bones"	Mike de Sève	Short	Co-produced with Baboon Animation.
BroDuel	Mike Annear	Short	
Earth to Allen: "Hunger Pains"	Dave Schlafman	Short	
Face Face	Chris Prynoski	Short	Also known as Space Face. Co-produced with Titmouse, Inc.
Fun Times with Rez!	Chris Conforti	Short	
Gumwad Island	Joe Rothenberg	Short	
Happy Zoo	Yum Yum London	Short	
Kid Impressive: "Squid of Doom"	Evan Sussman	Short	Co-produced with Hero4Hire Creative.
Learn Something with Luther and AJ	Kylar Loya and Bill Cleveland	Short	
Low Life	Mike Hollingsworth	Short	
The Magic Hour	Nath Milburn and Andrew Melzer	Short	
Menehunes	Chris Albrecht	Short	Co-produced with Titmouse, Inc.
P.E.: Paranormal Education	Jordan Geary, Harold Moss, and Keith Vincent	Short	Co-produced with FlickerLab.
Plunger the Dragon	James Kochalka	Short	
Russel & Fox's Cruel and Unusual Detention	Dan Abdo and Jason Patterson	Short	
The Squatch Scouts	Christopher Jammal	Short	
Torum Tellum	Jim Mortensen	Short	
Ziptronik Megablast	Nathan Jurevicius	Short	

=== 2016–2017 ===
Title	Created by	Status	Notes
Best Baddies	Max Wittert	Short	
Burger Bros	Kevin Li	Short	Co-produced with Aardman Nathan Love.
Dia De Los Tacos	Vincent Scala	Short	Formerly known as Monster Taco.
Dog and Squirrel	Andrea Gerstmann	Short	
Farkels	Greg Kletsel, Dessarae Bassil and Valerie Lockhart	Short	
The Girl from Dinosaur Island	Celestino Marina	Short	
Lazybones	Casey Alexander and Lizz Hickey	Short	Also known as Lazybones: A Humerus Short.
Mini Cops	Nicolette Groome	Short	
My Friend Pancake	Rikke Asbjoern	Short	
P.E.T. Academy	Robert Smith	Short	One of the four International pilot episodes included in this edition. Originally from the United Kingdom.
Pig and a Blanket	Brendon Ingvy Gillas	Short	
Planet Panic	Gene Goldstein	Short	
Pony	Ant Blades	Series pickup (Full)	One of the four International pilot episodes included in this edition. Originally from the United Kingdom.
Ramblers!	Morghan Fortier and Brett Jubinville	Short	Co-produced with Tinman Creative.
Robo Wonder Kid	Joel MacKenzie	Short	Formerly known as The Myth of Robo Wonder Kid. Based on the music video of the same name. Second version of the pilot.
Sharkdog	Jacinth Tan Yi Ting and Raihan Harun	Series pickup (shorts and full series)	One of the four International pilot episodes included in this edition. Originally from Singapore.
Slimelab	Nick Arciaga	Short	
Someone Needs to Stop Aunt Phyllis!	Lisa Vandenberg	Short	
Space Mission: Danger!	Lynn Wang and Ed Skudder	Short	
The Super Dooper Studios	Sabine Ravn and Stine Buhl	Short	

=== 2017–2018 ===
Title	Created by	Status	Notes
The Ballad of Bea & Cad: "Day Trip to the Aquarium Doom"	Tim Probert	Short	Co-produced with Aardman Nathan Love.
Barbabyan	Paul Noth and Patrick Noth	Short	
Camp Weedonwantcha	Katie Rice and Adam Wallander	Short	
Dungeon Crawlers	FresherLuke	Short	
Harold & Herbert: "Dumpster Diving"	Dan Krall	Short	
Harpy Gee	Brianne Drouhard	Short	Based on her webcomic of the same name
Jan + Bobbie	Hannah Watanabe-Rocco	Short	
Leashes	Derekh Froude and Michael Kaufman	Short	
The Prince and Mr. Whiskers	Cosmo Segurson	Short	
Tennis the Good Boy	Ronald Stanage and Andres Parada	Short	
Universal Brawlers of the Universe	Kevin Sukho Lee and Tim Sievert	Short	

=== Intergalactic Shorts Program (2021–2022) ===
Title	Created by	Status	Notes
Rock Paper Scissors: "TV Time"	Kyle Stegina and Josh Lehrman	Series pickup (Full)	
Wylde Pak	Paul Watling and Kyle Marshall	Series pickup (Full)	
The Other Side	Niki Lopez	Short	
Mac & Minnow	Gabrielle Dolbey	Short	

== Nick Jr. shorts ==
=== 2014–2015 ===
Title	Created by	Status	Notes
Corn & Peg	Chris Hamilton	Series pickup (Full)	co-produced with Oddbot Animation
DJ Cluck & MC Mole	Matt Morgan	Short	
Howdy, Harrdy	Henrique Lira	Short	Co-produced with Split Studio.
Hubble, Bubble and Squeak	CharacterShop and Miranda Larson	Short	
Ooman and Moof: "What Are Wings?"	Benedict Bowen	Short	Co-produced with Karrot Animation.

=== 2015–2016 ===
Title	Created by	Status	Notes
The Thing About Babies	Liza Steinberg, Ross Alvord, and Jen Cast	Short	

=== 2016–2017 ===
Title	Created by	Status	Notes
PRONTOsaurus	Evan Sussman and Allison Dressler Kramer	Short	Co-produced with Hero4Hire
Trufax: Tot Cop	Jason Tammemägi and Méabh Tammemägi	Series pickup (Full)	One of the four International pilot episodes included in this edition. Premiered on the Noggin App. Originally from Ireland.

=== 2017–2018 ===
Title	Created by	Status	Notes
Fur-Ever Family	Darin McGowan	Short	

== See also ==
- Cartoon Network Shorts Department - the Cartoon Network counterpart of the program.
