= Letter to a Pig =

2022 Israeli-French animated short film

- Hebrew: מכתב לחזיר
- Directed by: Tal Kantor
- Written by: Tal Kantor
- Produced by: Emmanuel-Alain Raynal; Pierre Baussaron; Amit Russell Gicelter
- Edited by: Efrat Berger
- Music by: Pierre Oberkampf
- Production companies: The Hive Studio (Israel); Miyu Productions (France)
- Release dates: 28 April 2022 (San Francisco International Film Festival, United States)
- Running time: 17 minutes
- Countries: Israel; France
- Language: Hebrew

Letter to a Pig (Hebrew: מכתב לחזיר) is a 2022 Israeli-French animated short film written and directed by Tal Kantor. The 17-minute animated film about generational trauma has been awarded in various international film festivals, including the Jerusalem Film Festival, the Ottawa International Animation Festival, the Annecy International Animation Film Festival and the Chicago International Children's Film Festival. The film was nominated for the 96th Academy Awards for Best Animated Short Film but lost to War Is Over!

== Plot ==
On 'Memorial Day', a Holocaust survivor reads a letter he wrote to the pig who saved his life to a classroom full of teenagers.

Whilst listening to his testimony, a young schoolgirl sinks into a twisted dream where she confronts questions of collective trauma, memory and identity.

== Release ==
The 17-minute short about collective memory and identity premiered as part of the 2022 San Francisco International Film Festival and won the Award for Best Short Film at the 2022 Israeli Film Academy Awards. The film was shortlisted at the 2023 César Awards and has been featured in a number of international film festivals, receiving accolades such as the Grand Prize for Best Narrative Short Animation at the Ottawa International Animation Festival and the Zlatko Grgic Award at the 2022 Zagreb World Festival of Animated Films.

== Accolades ==
Since its release, the film has been selected in various festivals around the world:

Year	Festivals	Award/Category	Status
2022	Zagreb World Festival of Animated Films	Zlatko Grgic Award	Won
2022	Zagreb World Festival of Animated Films	Grand Prize: Short Films Competition	Nominated
2022	San Francisco International Film Festival	Golden Gate Award for Best Animated Short	Nominated
2022	Ottawa International Animation Festival	Grand Prize for Best Narrative Short	Won
2022	Chicago International Children's Film Festival	Liv Ullman Peace Prize (Short Film)	Won
2022	Jerusalem Film Festival	The Jerusalem Development Authority Award for Best Animation Film	Won
2022	Jerusalem Film Festival	Award for Israeli Cinema	Nominated
2022	Israeli Film Academy Awards	Best Short Film	Won
2022	Annecy International Animated Film Festival	Cristal for Best Short	Nominated
2022	GLAS Animation	Grand Prix	Nominated
2023	Regard: Saguenay International Short Film Festival	Grand Prix: International Competition	Nominated
2023	Kustendorf International Film and Music Festival	The Golden Egg Festival Prize	Won
2023	Brussels International Animation Film Festival	Grand Prize for Best international Short Film	Won
2023	Animation Is Film Festival	Best Short Film	Won
2023	Aesthetica Short Film Festival	Best Animation	Won
2024	96th Academy Awards	Best Animated Short Film	Nominated
