= Rock Paper Scissors (TV series) =

American animated series

- Genre: Comedy
- Created by: Kyle Stegina; Josh Lehrman
- Voices of: Ron Funches; Thomas Lennon; Carlos Alazraqui; Melissa Villaseñor
- Opening theme: "Rock Paper Scissors"
- Ending theme: "Rock Paper Scissors" (instrumental)
- Composer: Mike Reagan
- Country of origin: United States
- Original language: English
- No. of seasons: 3
- No. of episodes: 40 (77 segments)

Production
- Executive producers: Kyle Stegina; Josh Lehrman; Conrad Vernon; Bob Boyle
- Production company: Nickelodeon Animation Studio

Original release
- Network: Nickelodeon
- Release: February 11, 2024 – October 12, 2026

Rock Paper Scissors is an American animated comedy television series created by Kyle Stegina and Josh Lehrman for Nickelodeon. The first original production to originate from the Nickelodeon Intergalactic Shorts Program, it was picked up for a full release in 2021; the first episodes were released on YouTube on August 19, 2023, and officially premiered on Nickelodeon on February 11, 2024, airing after the network's alternate broadcast of Super Bowl LVIII.

The series was renewed for two additional seasons on April 24, 2025, with the second season premiering in November 2025, while the third season premiered in June 2026. The series ran for three seasons and 40 episodes, with the final episode airing on October 12, 2026; it was confirmed to have been cancelled the following day.

== Plot ==
The show revolves around three friends: aspiring fashion model Rock, inventor Paper, and desperate-to-be-cool Scissors, who go on all sorts of wild adventures together.

== Characters ==
=== Main ===
- Rock (voiced by Ron Funches) – A model rock who has a big heart.
- Paper (voiced by Thomas Lennon) – A strip of paper who is an inventor and usually the voice of reason. He is also Sandpaper's younger brother.
- Scissors (voiced by Carlos Alazraqui) – An insecure bad boy humanoid pair of scissors who does mischievous schemes and mooches.

=== Supporting ===
- Pencil (voiced by Melissa Villaseñor) – A smart anthropomorphic pencil and Paper's crush.
- Lou Zer (voiced by Eddie Pepitone) – The trio's very bad-tempered trash bucket landlord. His catchphrase is "I'm raising the rent!". His name is a pun on the term "loser".
- The Rat Bros (all voiced by Ray Chase) – A group of four arrogant rat brothers named Logan, Brody, Brogan, and Dirf who love to party. Their repeated catchphrase is "Nice, bro!".
- Sandpaper (voiced by Lauren Ash) – Paper's older sister who works as an action movie star. She tends to turn mundane tasks into dramatic movie sequences.
- The Astonishing Catalina (voiced by Marlene Martinez) – Scissors' nemesis, a magician who uses her magic tricks to torment Scissors.
- Potato (voiced by Betsy Sodaro) – Rock's "go-with-the-flow" potato friend.
- Putty (voiced by Eugene Cordero) - A talking ball of purple putty who is friends with the trio. He can only repeat several simple phrases, such as "Haha, yeah!" and "You guys are the best."

=== Minor ===
- Lolly (voiced by Alessia Cara) - A talking lollipop who is a famous pop star.
- Officer Wishkowski (voiced by Carla Gugino) - An aggressive police officer who arrests people who lie about their birthdays.
- Chad Brockchad (voiced by Diedrich Bader) – A con artist who constantly scams the three protagonists.

== Episodes ==
=== Series overview ===
Series overview
Season	Episodes	Segments	Originally released	
Season	Episodes	Segments	First released	Last released
Pilot			August 19, 2023 (YouTube); December 25, 2023 (Nickelodeon)	
Special			February 5, 2024	
1	20	38	February 11, 2024	November 27, 2024
2	10	19	November 7, 2025	June 12, 2026
3	10	20	June 19, 2026	October 12, 2026

=== Pilot (2023) ===
Title	Written by	Storyboarded by	Original release date	Prod. code	U.S. viewers (millions)
"TV Time"	Josh Lehrman & Kyle Stegina	Nick Bachman & Ethan Hegge	August 19, 2023 (YouTube); December 25, 2023 (Nickelodeon) (Note: This pilot aired as a "sneak peek" of the series during the 2023 NFL Nickmas game. It was also released on the Nicktoons YouTube channel on August 19, 2023. The pilot officially premiered on Nickelodeon on February 6, 2024.)	000	0.90
Rock, Paper and Scissors fight over the TV until Scissors brings in an anthropomorphic shark that watches reality TV. The trio try to get their TV back, though one of their plans turns into developing a stage show, in which the shark thinks the whole world should see. It was planned out for 9 months, but had forgotten their original plan of getting the TV back. They end up in a game of elimination of a reality TV show, and the shark decides to vote himself to get eliminated, and with an additional help from Paper, gets eliminated, as everything goes back to normal until the house gets bulldozed.

=== Special (2024) ===
Title	Original release date	Prod. code	U.S. viewers (millions)
"Lights, Camera, Rock, Paper, Scissors!"	February 5, 2024	001	0.08
Rock, Paper, and Scissors are interviewed about their new show on Nickelodeon, Rock Paper Scissors.

=== Season 1 (2024) ===
The episodes are ordered below according to Nickelodeon's packaging order, and not their broadcast order.

No. overall	No. in season	Title	Storyboard directed by	Written by	Storyboarded by	Original release date	Prod. code	U.S. viewers (millions)
1	1	"Birthday Police"	James Burks	Josh Lehrman & Kyle Stegina	Max Johnson	February 28, 2024 (Note: This episode was first released on video on demand on August 22, 2023. "Birthday Police" was released on YouTube on September 2, 2023. "Paper's Big Lie" was released on YouTube on October 7, 2023. The episode was originally going to debut on November 6, 2023, although it would eventually be pulled.)	101	0.09
1	1	"Paper's Big Lie"	Ben Balistreri	Josh Lehrman & Kyle Stegina	David Shair	February 14, 2024	101	0.14
When Scissors constructs a lie that it is Rock's birthday in an opportunity to get free cake, the trio get caught, end up on the run from the Birthday Police, and hide in an underground cave with other people who have done the same thing. Paper falls in love with his next door neighbor Pencil, and when he becomes desperate to impress her, he lies about being a proper inventor. Things spill over when he ends up being the Earth's only hope against an alien invasion led by hippos.
2	2	"Pogo Sticks"	Ben Balistreri	Josh Lehrman & Kyle Stegina	Davey Jarrell	July 15, 2024	102	0.06
2	2	"Car Wash"	Rebecca Schauer	Josh Lehrman & Kyle Stegina	David Shair	July 16, 2024	102	0.08
In order to join the Rat Bros' pogo stick party and be cool, the trio seek to obtain a set of pogo sticks. When all else fails, they go and meet Georgie, the Queen of Uncool, who controls all things cool to help make them relevant, but they are rejected when that Georgie turns out to be the girl that Scissors did not invite to his birthday party. In the end, Rock realizes that the gang doesn't need to follow trends to be cool, but Paper and Scissors run off to find the next cool thing: six-foot phones. Rock has to find a new job after he accidentally destroys a car repeatedly at the car wash, attempting to land a gig at an evil robot corporation who plans to destroy the world. Paper and Scissors try to warn him and enter the workplace as faux-employees, but they get caught up in trying to outdo each other as smarter members of the corporation in a business meeting.
3	3	"Weekend Story"	James Burks	Julia Prescott	Isaiah Kim	February 14, 2024	103	0.14
3	3	"Putty"	Rebecca Schauer	Mike Trapp	Davey Jarrell	February 29, 2024	103	0.08
Paper, wanting to impress Pencil, enlists the help of Scissors to come up with an interesting weekend story. They do everything from skydiving, meeting pirates and even training a pair of tortoises in martial arts, but it's all overshadowed by Rock's amazing story: buying a hat. The trio get along with a new friend named Putty, so much that they want to invite him into their trio, but since there can't be four people in a trio, they all get scared thinking that one of them could be replaced, so they all try to cement their spots in the trio.
4	4	"Hide and Seek"	Rebecca Schauer	Josh Lehrman & Kyle Stegina	Carmen Liang	February 26, 2024	104	0.11
4	4	"The First Lou Episode"	James Burks	Josh Lehrman & Kyle Stegina	Isaiah Kim	February 11, 2024 (Note: This episode premiered as a "sneak peek" on Nickelodeon's nighttime programming block, Nick at Nite. The episode aired on Nickelodeon as a "new episode" on February 26, 2024.)	104	0.08
Having lost to Scissors multiple times, Paper is determined to beat him in a game of hide and seek. But when he and Rock are not able to find him in any part of the world, they figure out Scissors is hiding somewhere in time, leading them to finally find him and finish the game. In order to make him lower the rent, Rock, Paper & Scissors help their grumpy landlord Lou on his bucket list for one thing: becoming a pop star.
5	5	"The Susan"	Ben Balistreri	Julia Prescott	David Shair	March 4, 2024	105	0.12
5	5	"Eyebrows"	Ben Balistreri	Aram Spencer Porter	Jordan Koch	March 4, 2024	105	0.12
The trio try to enter their car, which they affectionately call The Susan, into a car show. But when they see how talented the other cars are, they try to turn her into a more normal, acceptable car to win the show. Rock gets a modeling gig and is super excited about it, but when his barber accidentally shaves off his eyebrows, Paper makes him a set of animatronic eyebrows to help him out, only for the eyebrows to get the gig rather than Rock. Meanwhile, Scissors hires two actors to play Rock and Paper since they can't join him on his jungle adventure.
6	6	"Scissors Gets a Job"	James Burks & Ben Balistreri	Mike Trapp, Josh Lehrman & Kyle Stegina	Isaiah Kim & David Shair	February 12, 2024	106	0.16
Scissors, struggling to make ends meet, is repeatedly fired from various jobs until he lands a position as a janitor for a secret crime-fighting organization, embarking on his first (and only) mission to confront a supervillain alongside his fellow janitors.
7	7	"The Arctic"	James Burks	Aram Spencer Porter	Max Johnson	February 13, 2024	107	0.14
7	7	"Prank War"	Rebecca Schauer	Josh Lehrman & Kyle Stegina	Carmen Liang	February 20, 2024	107	0.13
After the heater breaks, freezing their apartment, Paper tries to save his friends while Lou attends Landlord Con. Having lost 10 years in a row to the Rat Bros, Rock and Scissors bring on Paper to help them win their prank war. But to their dismay, Pencil sides with the Rat Bros and invents a laser that can alter their genetic code, making their jobs a lot harder.
8	8	"Key Limes"	Ben Balistreri	Josh Lehrman & Kyle Stegina	Jordan Koch	February 20, 2024	108	0.13
8	8	"Six Pieces of Turkey"	Rebecca Schauer	Julia Prescott	Davey Jarrell	March 5, 2024	108	0.10
It's Roommate Appreciation Day, and Paper's action star sister, Sandpaper, decides to drop by. Having blown up the key limes they needed to make Paper's signature key lime pie, Sandpaper and the trio go on an unnecessarily action-packed journey to get another batch of limes. Rock finds out that the amount of turkey in his microwave dinner is only four instead of the six pieces advertised on the box, so he stages a protest next to the headquarters of the company that produces the meals to make them change it to have six pieces as advertised.
9	9	"The Other Rock Paper Scissors"	James Burks	Aram Spencer Porter	Max Johnson	July 17, 2024	109	0.10
9	9	"The Astonishing Catalina"	James Burks	Josh Lehrman & Kyle Stegina	Isaiah Kim	July 18, 2024	109	0.07
When the trio receive a gift basket from Canada that they don't remember getting, they find out it belongs to another trio also named Rock, Paper and Scissors who are better people than them in every way. Jealous of them, they try to find dirt on them to prove they aren't who they say they are. Alas, they cannot. But while trying to be more like them, they come across yet another trio who are worse than them, making them feel better. Scissors has a fight with a magician named Catalina about a magic trick that she wanted to do and he ended up humiliating her, so it's up to Rock and Paper to end their feud.
10	10	"Pencil Comes Over"	Rebecca Schauer	Josh Lehrman & Kyle Stegina	Carmen Liang	February 21, 2024	110	0.10
10	10	"The Wind"	Rebecca Schauer	Mike Trapp	Carmen Liang	March 5, 2024	110	0.10
When Pencil visits to watch a horror movie, Paper is worried that he won't be able to handle it, so he decides to use Pencil's calming glasses. However, he accidentally grabs the wrong pair of glasses and instead of helping him get through the movie, they make Paper's lies come back to haunt him. The news reports that there'll be a light breeze around town, but Rock and Scissors are worried that Paper is out on the street. The wind blows Paper away and now he has to find a way to safely escape, with Rock and Scissors attempting to help.
11	11	"The Holiday Picture"	Rebecca Schauer	Juila Prescott	Davey Jarrell	July 22, 2024	111	0.13
11	11	"Scrubs"	Ben Balistreri	Mike Trapp	Jordan Koch	February 15, 2024	111	0.08
The trio always end up with a not so perfect photo for the holidays every year, so this year they want the photo to go right, but they run into ghostly problems taking it. Note: This episode includes a reference to Rocko's Modern Life when Rock has on Rocko's signature shirt in a photo and Carlos Alazraqui as Scissors does a perfect Rocko impression. When Scissors points out and is annoyed by the fact that Paper is wearing scrubs and pretending to be a doctor to gain people's respect, he also pretends to be a famous basketball star, thus leading them to go at each other's throats until one of them confesses that they aren't who they say they are.
12	12	"Bowling"	James Burks	Josh Lehrman & Kyle Stegina	Isaiah Kim	July 23, 2024	112	0.07
12	12	"The Character Quiz"	Ben Balistreri	Aram Spencer Porter	David Shair	July 24, 2024	112	0.10
Rock challenges Scissors to a game of bowling when Scissors has an addiction to the bowling alley's curly fries and he gets free games and takes advantages of deals. Meanwhile, Paper and Pencil try to put their two legs on at a time together in pants. Rock tries to prove to everyone that he's not who he thinks he is when he is given the worst result on a character quiz, while Paper and Scissors star in the sitcom "The Gang's All Here" about 27 characters living under the same roof, and its 1,000th episode is gonna be live.
13	13	"Potato"	James Burks	Josh Lehrman & Kyle Stegina	Max Johnson	July 25, 2024	113	0.07
13	13	"The Fart Joke Debate"	Rebecca Schauer	Josh Lehrman & Kyle Stegina	Davey Jarrell	February 11, 2024 (Note: This episode premiered as a "sneak peek" on Nickelodeon's nighttime programming block, Nick at Nite. The episode aired on Nickelodeon as a "new episode" on February 22, 2024.)	113	0.28
Paper becomes jealous when his friends start to like Potato, who makes everyone laugh. So he attempts to win back their attention. When Paper doesn't think that fart jokes are funny, Rock, Scissors & Pencil get help from an old comedian who used to tell stand-up comedy using fart jokes.
14	14	"Paper's Secret Weapon"	Ben Balistreri	Aram Spencer Porter	David Shair	February 27, 2024	114	0.08
14	14	"The Sled Hill"	Rebecca Schauer	Josh Lehrman & Kyle Stegina	Carmen Liang	March 6, 2024	114	0.08
Rock and Scissors are worried that Paper will once again lose at the Inventor's Fair and become an emotional wreck. But when they notice that Paper makes actually functioning inventions whenever he's angry, they and Pencil, as his friends, try to make him incredibly angry so he can make a decent invention to win the fair. Scissors sleds down a dangerous, snowy hill that Paper deliberately warned him not to, breaking his arm in the process. Paper, who doesn't realize that Scissors did exactly what he expected him to, takes him to an extreme adventure park as a reward for resisting his intuition. Rock tries to get Scissors to tell Paper the truth, but Scissors doesn't want Paper to brag about being right and go into a whole musical production.
15	15	"Scissors' Catapult"	Ben Balistreri & Isaiah Kim	Mike Trapp	Jackie Lee	November 12, 2024	115	0.08
15	15	"Pencil and Potato"	James Burks	Julia Prescott	Max Johnson	November 13, 2024	115	0.05
A man from Scissors' past returns all buffed up and threatens him that if he does not mow his lawn, he'll kick his butt. Pencil and Potato get lost in the mountains.
16	16	"Resolutions"	James Burks	Josh Lehrman & Kyle Stegina	Taylor Chang & Amanda Tran	November 14, 2024	116	0.08
16	16	"Paper's Book Club"	Rebecca Schauer	Josh Lehrman & Kyle Stegina	Davey Jarrell	November 11, 2024	116	0.07
Scissors quickly tries to do his New Year's resolution. Paper puts together a book club with the least intelligent people he knows.
17	17	"The Family Business"	James Burks	Josh Lehrman & Kyle Stegina	Max Johnson	November 11, 2024	117	0.07
17	17	"Glitter Bomb"	Rebecca Schauer	Josh Lehrman & Kyle Stegina	Davey Jarrell	November 18, 2024	117	0.07
Rock tries to impress his father when he comes to town. Paper plays a prank on Rock, but Rock does not like it and vows fierce revenge.
18	18	"National Paper Day"	Isaiah Kim	Juila Prescott	David Shair	July 13, 2024	118	0.12
18	18	"Helping with the Groceries"	Rebecca Schauer	Josh Lehrman & Kyle Stegina	Carmen Liang	November 19, 2024	118	0.05
When Paper finds out about Rock's holiday called National Rock Day, he desires a holiday about paper. After failing to prove himself worthy of one to the Council of Holidays, he goes to a machine indexing all of the holidays and deletes National Raspberry Cake Day from the calendar, sending the world into chaos. Meanwhile, Scissors keeps the National Rock Day spirit going by dragging the marching band parade into different events the marchers are missing out on over many days and weeks, calling it "an apology tour." Scissors goes deep in his mind to decide if he should help his friends bring in the groceries.
19	19	"Diapers"	Isaiah Kim	Jordan Koch	Max Johnson	November 25, 2024	119	0.06
19	19	"R.O.V.E.R."	James Burks	Josh Lehrman & Kyle Stegina	Amanda Tran, Taylor Chang, & Max Johnson	November 26, 2024	119	0.03
Scissors gets embarrassed when Chad Brockchad puts him on a new diaper product. Rock takes care of a deadly robotic dog to prove that he can have a pet.
20	20	"Trash"	Isaiah Kim & Rebecca Schauer	Josh Lehrman, Kyle Stegina & Ron Rappaport	David Shair & Carmen Liang	November 27, 2024	120	0.07
The trash in the apartment turns sentient because Scissors is too lazy to take it out despite Paper's insistence. Another tenant named Dian (Wanda Sykes) does it for them, as she was fed up with all of the trio's antics. Meanwhile, Rock is hoping a good story will come along and Lou falls in love with a queen.

=== Season 2 (2025–26) ===
The episodes are ordered below according to Nickelodeon's packaging order, and not their broadcast order.

No. overall	No. in season	Title	Storyboard directed by	Written by	Storyboarded by	Original release date	Prod. code	U.S. viewers (millions)
21	1	"Franz Roll and the Lost Rainbow Hot Pants of Atraxes the Apple Bottomed"	Emily Broder	Josh Lehrman & Kyle Stegina	Nick Bakker & Agnes Salek	November 7, 2025	201	0.07
Rock quests for an ancient artifact in order to prove he is worthy of working with his modelling role model, Franz Roll. Paper and Scissors compete to be more supportive of Rock in the hopes that one of them will head his entourage when he's famous.
22	2	"Paper and Pencil Tell a Joke"	Chad Hicks	Rekha Barua, Josh Lehrman & Kyle Stegina	Ian Westoby	November 14, 2025	202	0.04
22	2	"Scissors' Orchestra"	Chad Hicks	Josh Lehrman & Kyle Stegina	Emma Frew	November 14, 2025	202	0.04
After getting their first-ever laugh at a party, Paper and Pencil become obsessed with recapturing the feeling and decide to become stand-up comedians, retelling the exact same joke over and over again in various ways. Meanwhile, Scissors tries to get himself fired from a desk job so that he can yell "You can't fire me, I quit" in a cool way, but his attempts at getting fired lead him to be promoted. Scissors hires a full orchestra to follow him everywhere, but soon realizes he is missing love in his life with Cate Blanket.
23	3	"Shoot"	Riccardo Durante	Josh Lehrman & Kyle Stegina	Brian Coughlan	November 28, 2025	203	0.07
23	3	"Rock's First Day of Work"	Jeff Barker	Josh Lehrman & Kyle Stegina	Derek Jessome	November 28, 2025	203	0.07
Rock, Paper and Scissors struggle to cut ties with their overly competitive plant friend Shoot after he returns from his 10-year trip in Australia, having been banished there from a bet by Scissors. Not being able to pour a word from their mouth in front of him, the three decide that the one who loses the next competition Shoot makes will tell him the relationship is over. Unfortunately, that competition involves making 1 million dollars from farming, which proves to be a challenge. Following the events of "Franz Roll and the Lost Rainbow Hot Pants of Atraxes the Apple Bottomed", Rock is stressed out by the amount of work that Franz Roll has loaded onto him as his new assistant. Meanwhile, Scissors gets around life's troubles by using a puppet fall guy of himself, and he convinces Rock to cut corners through life like him. This works until Rock disguises a group of baby penguins as white owls, which Franz plans to walk on during an airborne fashion display, putting his life in danger.
24	4	"Paper Attends an Elite Institution"	Riccardo Durante & Chad Hicks	Josh Lehrman & Kyle Stegina	Brian Coughlan & Emma Frew	December 5, 2025	204	0.04
24	4	"The New Landlord"	Chad Hicks	Josh Lehrman & Kyle Stegina	Emma Frew	December 5, 2025	204	0.04
Thinking he got accepted to an elite institution, Paper is shocked to discover he was actually placed in a third grade classroom. After Scissors manages to convince Lou to quit his job as landlord, the Astonishing Catalina returns to get revenge on Scissors.
25	5	"The Origami Robot"	Jeff Barker	Josh Lehrman & Kyle Stegina	Nick Bakker	December 12, 2025	205	0.03
25	5	"Scissors Sees an Inspirational Sports Movie"	Riccardo Durante	Josh Lehrman & Kyle Stegina	Agnes Salek	December 12, 2025	205	0.03
After Scissors accidentally eats a pinecone during Christmas, Pencil sends down an origami robot in Scissors' body to remove it. After watching an inspirational football movie about not giving up, Scissors signs up to play professional football, which worries Rock and Paper.
26	6	"The Altrustic-Off"	Chad Hicks	Paige VanTassell	Ian Westoby	May 15, 2026	206	0.11
26	6	"The Album"	Jeff Barker	Josh Lehrman & Kyle Stegina	Derek Jessome	May 15, 2026	206	0.11
When the trio discover the Rat Bros. take a job at tutoring underprivileged children, they try to up their altruistic game in any mean necessary. After Scissors accidentally drops noodles on his girlfriend, Lolly's dress, she makes a hit breakup album about him, making him the most hated man in the world.
27	7	"Paper Takes the Phones"	Chad Hicks	Josh Lehrman	Emma Frew	May 22, 2026	207	0.09
27	7	"The Bedtime Story"	Riccardo Durante	Josh Lehrman & Kyle Stegina	Brian Coughlan	May 22, 2026	207	0.09
When Paper takes away Rock and Scissors' phones in order for them to bond together, he learns of a zombie invasion in the town and must keep Rock and Scissors from finding out. When Rock refuses to sleep without a bedtime story, Paper and Scissors try their best to tell him a good story without their own personal additions.
28	8	"Scissors Is a Good Boy"	Jeff Barker	Josh Lehrman & Kyle Stegina	Nick Bakker	May 29, 2026	208	0.05
28	8	"Paper's Family Get-Together"	Riccardo Durante	Josh Lehrman & Kyle Stegina	Agnes Salek	May 29, 2026	208	0.05
When Franz Roll meets Scissors and mistakes him for a dog, Rock soon grows jealous of their newfound relationship. Meanwhile, Paper tries to prove he's not a boring person. Embarrassed and worried his family members will mock him on their annual get-together, Paper stages a kidnapping act in order to escape the gathering.
29	9	"Moonami 12"	Chad Hicks	Rekha Barua & Josh Lehrman	Ian Westoby	June 5, 2026	209	0.12
29	9	"Spider Court"	Jeff Barker	Josh Lehrman & Kyle Stegina	Derek Jessome	June 5, 2026	209	0.12
When the trio learn about the new high-pricing of candy before the screening of the new Moonami film, they go on a wild goose chase to retrieve some more before the showing starts. When Rock, Paper, and Scissors get sentenced to spider court after squishing a spider, they try to prove their innocence, while Rock uncovers a huge secret behind the scenes.
30	10	"Scissors, the Supervillain"	Riccardo Durante	Josh Lehrman & Kyle Stagina	Agnes Salek	June 12, 2026	210	N/A
30	10	"Car Wash Nationals"	Jeff Barker	Josh Lehrman	Nick Bakker	June 12, 2026	210	N/A
Inspired by a superhero movie, Scissors decides to be a supervillain and teams up with Dreamscape to turn the city into his sheep army. However, Scissors soon regrets it after realizing there's a long process to being evil. Meanwhile, Paper tries to prove he's a good guy, but struggles to maintain his cool. When Rock is sick and can't work his shift at the Robo Car Wash, Paper and Scissors must cover for him, until they learn of a dance competition, and struggle to keep up with the other robots.

=== Season 3 (2026) ===
The episodes are ordered below according to Nickelodeon's packaging order, and not their broadcast order.

No. overall	No. in season	Title	Storyboard directed by	Written by	Storyboarded by	Original release date	Prod. code	U.S. viewers (millions)
31	1	"The Watching"	Riccardo Durante	Chase Mitchell	Brian Coughlan	October 12, 2026	TBA	TBD
31	1	"Nightmares"	Chad Hicks	Paige VanTassell	N/A	October 12, 2026	TBA	TBD
The trio go out birdwatching, but things take a terrible turn when the birds decide to watch them as an act of revenge for having their privacy invaded. When the trio find themselves trapped in a nightmare, they try to find a way to wake up without one of them peeing the bed.
32	2	"Emotional Support Convertible"	Ian Westoby	Chase Mitchell	N/A	June 19, 2026	TBA	0.14
32	2	"The Baseball"	Jeff Barker	Josh Lehrman & Kyle Stegina	Derek Jessome	June 19, 2026	TBA	0.14
After Scissors wins a convertible from a raffle, he registers it as an emotional support convertible, which annoys Paper as he brings it everywhere he goes. The latter then gets the idea to secretly sell the convertible, but is forced to win it back in a demolition derby, when Scissors proves he can't live without it. After the trio's baseball lands in an air force base, they are swept into a high-stakes action mission to save the country, when all they want to do is to just play baseball.
33	3	"Rock's Half Birthday"	Riccardo Durante	Josh Lehrman & Kyle Stegina	Brian Coughlan	June 26, 2026	TBA	N/A
33	3	"Cherry Picking"	Chad Hicks	Josh Lehrman & Kyle Stegina	N/A	June 26, 2026	TBA	N/A
When Rock wishes to fly on his half-birthday, Paper and Scissors struggle to make his wish come true, without him turning into a bummer like them. Scissors begins to feel alone when Rock and Paper start going cherry picking without him, and tries to get their attention.
34	4	"Rock, Rock, Rock, Rock, Rock, Paper, Scissors"	Riccardo Durante	Josh Lehrman & Kyle Stegina	Agnes Salek	July 10, 2026	TBA	N/A
34	4	"The Wish"	Jeff Barker	Josh Lehrman & Kyle Stegina	Nick Bakker	July 10, 2026	TBA	N/A
Rock makes several clones of himself using Pencil's new cloning device, which she and Paper struggle to keep under control, while Scissors falls in love with a female Rock clone. The trio find a genie that will grant them one wish, but just before he can, the genie's 1,000 year curse ends and he returns to being a human. To try and turn him back into a genie, the trio buy a crystal that will do just that, but end up turning Pencil into a genie by accident.
35	5	"The Train Problem"	Jeff Barker	Josh Lehrman & Kyle Stegina	Derek Jessome	July 17, 2026	TBA	N/A
35	5	"Salmon Delivery for Ya"	Ian Westoby	Josh Lehrman & Kyle Stegina	N/A	July 17, 2026	TBA	N/A
While Paper is on his way to Brawn Con with his sister Sandpaper on a train, a villainess hijacks the train and tries to force Paper to solve an algebra problem to save the lives of the passengers. Meanwhile, Rock and Scissors compete to see who is the number one fan of a bee-themed superhero named Dr. Honeycomb. Rock and Scissors plan on doing the perfect prank call involving a fake salmon delivery, but the former is forced to bail after being called by Franz Roll to watch his pet elephants, one of whom breaks loose. During this, Scissors tries his prank phone call on the White House, resulting in him and Paper being roped into a high-stakes mission to recover classified information.
36	6	"Hardcore"	Chad Hicks	Fareid El Gafy	N/A	July 24, 2026	TBA	N/A
36	6	"Scissors' New Therapist"	Riccardo Durante	Josh Lehrman & Kyle Stegina	Brian Coughlan	July 24, 2026	TBA	N/A
Paper lays out a rule chart and allows everyone to make one new rule every year. Scissors makes it a rule that everyone must be hardcore, which Paper struggles to do. When Scissors' regular therapist goes on a vacation to Fiji and refuses to let him come along, she refers him to her colleague, Dr. Carnahan, who looks exactly like Logan the Rat Bro.
37	7	"The Henry Winkler Episode"	Jeff Barker	Josh Lehrman	Nick Bakker	July 31, 2026	TBA	N/A
37	7	"Paper Loves Potato"	Riccardo Durante	Josh Lehrman & Kyle Stegina	Agnes Salek	July 31, 2026	TBA	N/A
The trio accidentally crash land in Henry Winkler's house while attempting to escape with 500 tubs of limited cheeseburger-flavored ice cream, so to make it up to him, they allow him to join them on a wacky adventure. Unfortunately, said wacky adventure involves Winkler robbing a museum, and he uses his charisma to frame Paper and Scissors for the crime. Paper plans a fancy dinner at a restaurant with Pencil so he can confess his feeling towards her, but she is unable to show up, and Potato arrives at the restaurant and eats with Paper. When Rock and Scissors witness this, they start a rumor on their new web show that Paper and Potato are together that becomes widespread, and Paper tries all he can to convince everyone they are not together, even trying to lose a competition against a past boyfriend of Potato.
38	8	"Sandpaper's Workout Program"	Jeff Barker	Josh Lehrman & Kyle Stegina	Derek Jessome	August 7, 2026	TBA	N/A
38	8	"The Secret"	Ian Westoby	Josh Lehrman & Kyle Stegina	N/A	August 7, 2026	TBA	N/A
Sandpaper takes away the trio's video game console and forces them to participate in her workout program, which is actually a survival run through a dangerous jungle. When Rock and Scissors discover that Potato has won the International Genius Award for using her DNA to save endangered species, Rock, who is particularly bad at keeping secrets, struggles to hide this from Paper.
39	9	"Paper: Renowned Researcher"	Riccardo Durante	Josh Lehrman	Brian Coughlan	August 21, 2026	TBA	N/A
39	9	"Meatball"	Chad Hicks	Josh Lehrman & Kyle Stegina	N/A	August 21, 2026	TBA	N/A
Paper attends a talk show to discuss Caveman Athletics, only to discover that not only is he not the first person to research it, but the person who first did it disproves his theory that cavemen's favorite sport was ice hockey. Paper uses Pencil's time machine to go back to the prehistoric era and teach the cavemen ice hockey, but when this fails, he goes back 27 years into the past to when the first researcher of Caveman Athletics was a child in an attempt to bully and discourage him from researching, but this only results in the amount of Caveman Athletics researchers increasing in numbers. Lou goes to the trio to try and save his 30-year-old cat, Meatball, who is dying. At their suggestion, Lou takes him to a vampire who turns his beloved cat into a vampire cat so he'll live forever, but trying to keep his cat safe and well in his new form proves to be more challenging than he thought, and at the suggestion of Rock, Paper, and eventually even Scissors, Lou decides he has to let Meatball go.
40	10	"Scissors' Perfect Match"	Riccardo Durante	Josh Lehrman & Rekha Barua	Agnes Salek	August 28, 2026	TBA	N/A
40	10	"The Apology Soirée"	Jeff Barker	Josh Lehrman & Kyle Stegina	Nick Bakker	August 28, 2026	TBA	N/A
After months of waiting for his perfect match on a dating app, Scissors finally meets a girl who wants to meet him, Delphine, who turns out to be a mermaid. However, Scissors is unable to convince Rock and Paper he's dating a mermaid and goes to great lengths to prove this, at the potential cost of his newfound relationship. Rock, having worked for Franz Roll for a year now, desperately wants him to teach him some modeling moves. When Franz wants to become a giant, Rock borrows a machine that can alter the size of anyone it blasts, but accidentally shrinks himself and Franz Roll, and they must survive the chaos as Paper and Scissors hold an apology soirée to everyone they've ever wronged.

== Production ==
Rock Paper Scissors was greenlit for a full series from Nickelodeon's Intergalactic Shorts Program in November 2021. Produced by Nickelodeon Animation, the original Rock Paper Scissors short was by Kyle Stegina and Josh Lehrman (who both created the Disney Channel series Bizaardvark, and who wrote the script for Seth Green and Matthew Senreich's Robot Chicken), with Conrad Vernon and Bob Boyle serving as executive producers on the series.

The full pilot episode was released on August 19, 2023, on the Nicktoons YouTube channel, and an exclusive preview of the pilot was introduced at the NFL Nickmas game on December 25, 2023.

On April 24, 2025, the series was renewed for two more seasons. The second season premiered on November 7, 2025, while the third season premiered on June 19, 2026.

On October 13, 2026, series co-creator Josh Lehrman announced that the show was cancelled after three seasons.
