= Swimming with Wings =

2022 Israeli-Dutch animated short film

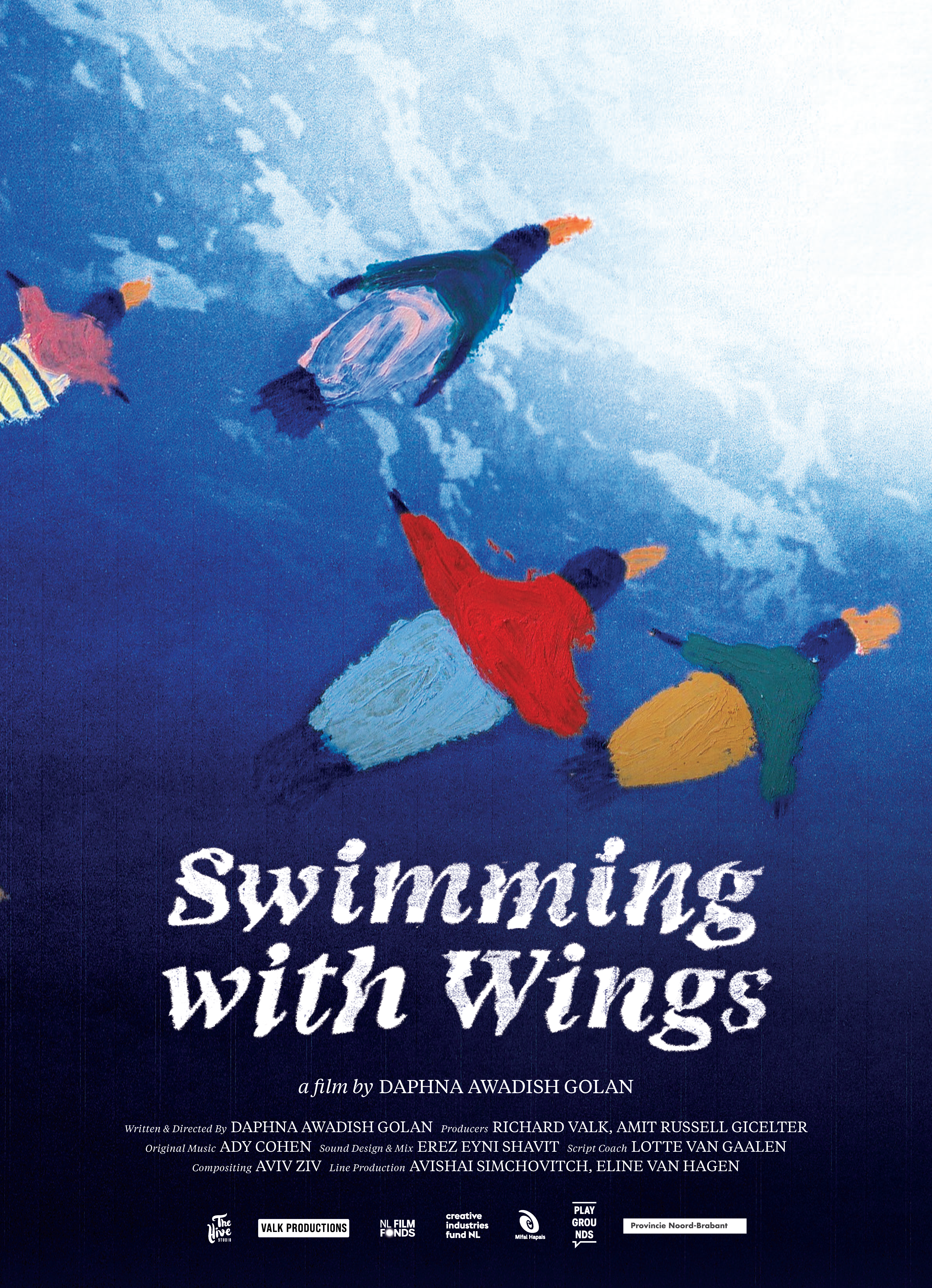
- Hebrew: לשחות עם כנפיים
- Directed by: Daphna Awadish
- Written by: Daphna Awadish
- Produced by: Richard Valk; Amit Russell Gicelter; Avishai Simhovitch (Line Producer)
- Edited by: Daphna Awadish
- Music by: Ady Cohen
- Production companies: The Hive Studio (Israel); Valk Productions (Netherlands)
- Distributed by: Studio Wasia; SND Films (Sales)
- Release date: 13 November 2023
- Running time: 10 minutes
- Countries: Israel; Netherlands
- Languages: Dutch, English, Hebrew

Swimming with Wings (Hebrew: לשחות עם כנפיים) is a 2023 Israeli-Dutch animated short documentary written and directed by Daphna Awadish. The film explores the immigration experience through the eyes of little Israeli girl learning how to swim with clothes on in the Netherlands.

The 10-minute short premiered in multiple festivals worldwide, including the 2023 Ottawa International Animation Festival, the Warsaw Film Festival, and the FIPADOC International Documentary Festival. In addition, the film won the Grand Prix du Jury at the Meknes International Animation Film Festival in Morocco, the ECFA Documentary Film Award at the Olympia International Film Festival in Greece, a Jury Award finalist at the New York International Children's Film Festival, and the ECFA Award at the PLAY Festival at the Lisbon International Children's Film Festival in Portugal.

== Plot ==
Lyri recently moved to the Netherlands with her family and reflects on her experiences adjusting to this new environment. Although she would have preferred to stay in Israel, she finds herself navigating a world filled with unfamiliar customs. One of the most striking differences she notes is that children in the Netherlands learn to swim in their street clothes, highlighting the unique cultural practices she is encountering.

== Accolades ==
Since its release, the film has been selected in various festivals around the world:

Year	Festivals	Award/Category	Status
2023	Ottawa International Animation Festiva	Best Short Film	Nominated
2023	Olympia International Film Festival for Children and Young People	ECFA Documentary Film Award	Won
2023	Dok Leipzig	Short Film Competition	Nominated
2023	BANJALUKA International Animated Film	Short Film Competition	Nominated
2023	Animest	Short Film Competition	Nominated
2023	Warsaw Film Festival	Short Film Competition	Nominated
2024	17th ANIMASYROS International Animation Festival	International Competition Section	Nominated
2024	Rising of Lusitania Animadoc FF	Special Jury Award	Won
2024	FIPADOC	Short Film Competition	Nominated
2024	Kaohsiung Film Festival	Children's Jury Award	Won
2024	New York International Children's Film Festival	Jury award	Nominated
2024	Lisbon International Children Film Festival (PLAY Festiva)	ECFA Award	Won
2024	Psaroloco International Children's & Young People's Film Festival	Jury award Human rights and environment	Won
2024	Meknes International Animation Film Festival	Short Film Competition	Won
2024	IFF - Integrazione Film Festival	Short Film Competition	Nominated
