= Zohar Dvir =

Israeli film director and animator

- זוהר דביר
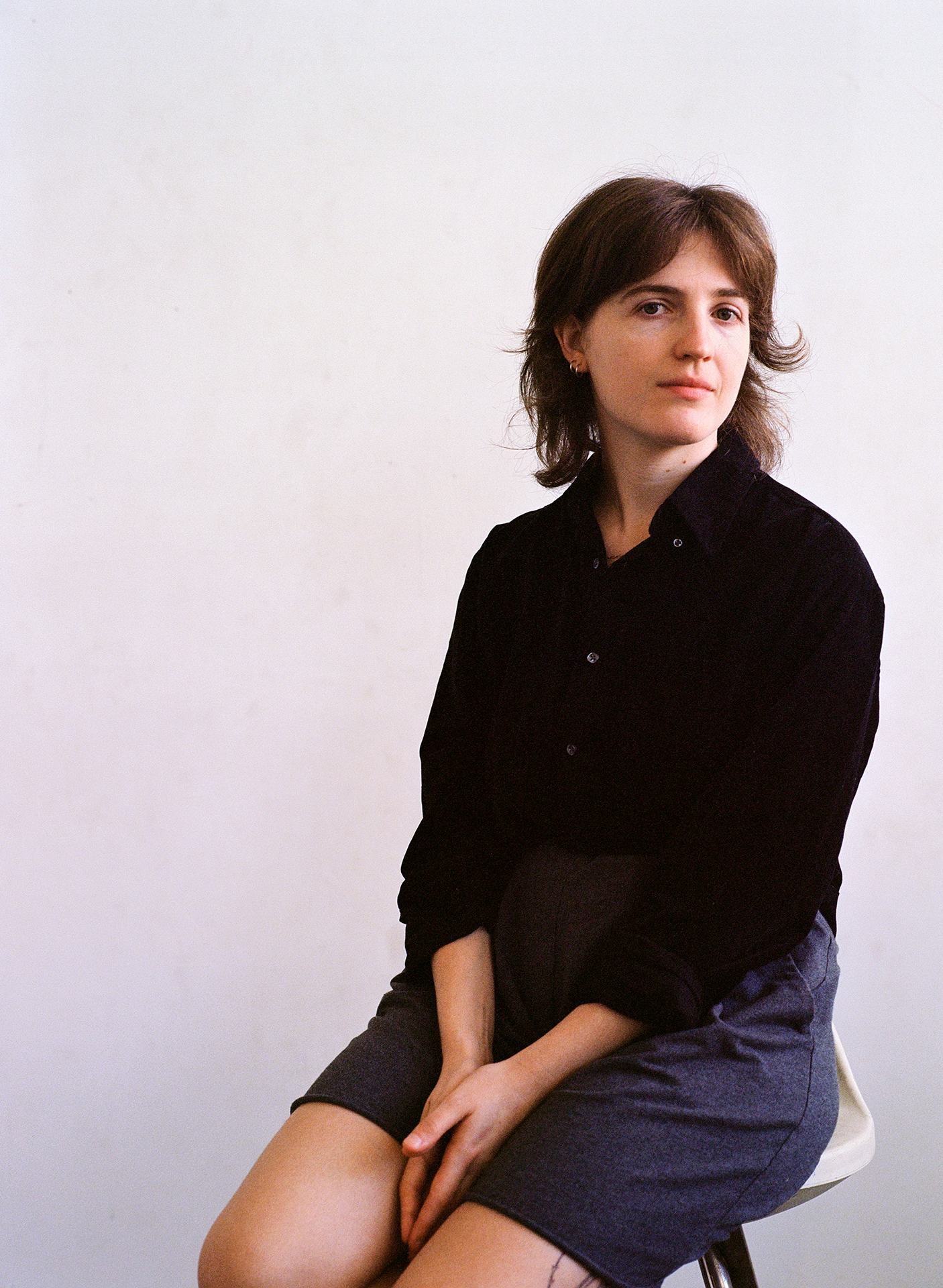
- Born: 28 August 1991 (age 35); Israel
- Education: Royal College of Art
- Occupations: Film director; Visual Artist
- Known for: Butterfly Kiss; Mercury's Retrograde

Zohar Dvir (Hebrew: זוהר דביר; born August 28, 1991) is an Israeli-German director, screenwriter, and animator. She is known for her work in animated short films, characterized by blending unique visual storytelling with experimental techniques. She graduated with a bachelor's degree in Visual communication from the Bezalel Academy of Arts and Design in Jerusalem in 2017, and proceeded with a master's degree in Moving Image Design from the Royal College of Art, London, in 2020, from which she graduated with her film Mercury's Retrograde.

== Career and style ==
Dvir has directed and written several animated short films exploring themes of identity, emotion, and surrealism. Her films are usually characterized by blending unique visual storytelling with experimental techniques. One example is Butterfly Kiss (2024), which starts as an apparently classic love tale between two women, but takes a surreal turn when one wakes up in an apocalyptic world and finds that her lover has transformed into a butterfly. Another film which demonstrates her signature style of blending techniques is Mercury’s Retrograde (2020), a satire deriving from Carl Jung's theory of the archetypes of the collective unconscious, about a never-ending quest toward self-realisation, self-improvement, and life’s answers.

Most of Dvir’s films are made using CGI animation, but feature a variety of techniques and elements which do not necessarily align with the classical hyper-realistic style typical to the medium. Some of those include drawing 2D facial features on top of 3D meshes (Mercury’s Retrograde) and implementing 3D characters in 2D environments (Butterfly Kiss). Throughout her films, Dvir has experimented with genres such as romance, psychological thrillers, body horror, science fiction, surrealism, and satire.

Beyond her personal filmmaking endeavors, Dvir works as a freelance animator and has created several music videos, and has also made her mark in the academic field as a lecturer in the Department of Visual Communication at the Bezalel Academy of Arts and Design in Jerusalem.

== Awards and recognition ==
Dvir's films have been screened at international film festivals and have garnered significant recognition and critical acclaim within the animation community, earning awards and being showcased at major international festivals. Notably, her film Butterfly Kiss won the Gold Hugo at the Chicago International Film Festival.

Mercury's Retrograde received the UK Student Award at the 2020 Encounters Film Festival and was honored as a Vimeo Staff Pick. Her works have also been featured in festivals such as the Annecy International Animation Film Festival, Ottawa International Animation Festival, Vienna Shorts, and the London International Animation Festival. Dvir is a recipient of a grant from the America-Israel Cultural Foundation.

== Filmography ==
- Butterfly Kiss (2024) – Director, Screenwriter – Produced by Fabian Driehorst (Fabian&Fred) and Amit Gicelter (The Hive Studio), under Israeli-German co-production. Funded by MOIN Film Fund, FFA German Federal Film Board, and Gesher Multicultural Film Fund.
- Mercury's Retrograde (2020) – Director, Screenwriter, Animator
- Intergalactic Love Story: Part 1 (2019) – Director, Screenwriter, Animator
- We Are Future Shock (2019) – Director, Screenwriter, Animator
