= Black Slide =

- Directed by: Uri Lotan
- Written by: Uri Lotan
- Produced by: Amit Russell Gicelter, Andrew Lord
- Production companies: The Hive Studio, Flipbook Studio
- Distributed by: Miyu Distribution
- Release date: 2021
- Running time: 11 minutes
- Countries: Israel; United Kingdom

Black Slide is a 2021 Israeli/British animated short film directed by Uri Lotan. The 11-minute short has been presented in a number of film festivals, including the Annecy International Animated Film Festival and the Indy Shorts Film Festival. Black Slide also won the Audience award for Best Short Film at the 2022 British Animation Awards and is now qualified for the 95th Academy Awards in the eligible films under the category Best Animated Short Film.

== Plot ==
A young boy faces his deepest fears as he and his friend sneak into the scariest slide of the water park.

== Reception ==
Since its release, the film has been selected in various festivals around the world:

Year	Festivals	Award/Category	Status
2021	Olympia International Film Festival for Children and Young People	International Youth Jury Award	Won
2022	Annecy International Animated Film Festival	Cristal for Best Animated Short	Nominated
2022	British Animation Awards	Audience Award for Best Short Film	Won
2022	Utah Arts Festival	Grand Jury Prize	Won
2022	Turku Animated Film Festival	TAFF Junior Award	Won
2022	Indy Shorts Film Festival	Best Animated Short	Won
2022	Heartland Indy Shorts	Animated Grand Prize	Won
