= Broken Branches =

Short documentary film by Ayala Sharot

- ענפים שבורים
- Directed by: Ayala Sharot
- Written by: Ayala Sharot
- Produced by: Amit Gicelter
- Starring: Michal Rechter
- Edited by: Ayala Sharot; Tal Rabiner
- Music by: Frank Ilfman
- Production company: The Hive Studio
- Release date: October 19, 2014 (Haifa International Film Festival)
- Running time: 25 minutes
- Country: Israel
- Language: Hebrew

Broken Branches is a 2014 short Israeli documentary film by Ayala Sharot. Through her granddaughter's eyes, the film tells the story of Michal Rechter, who left her family in Poland at age 14 and traveled to Mandatory Palestine, on the eve of the Second World War. Broken Branches intersperses interviews with animation. The film won various international awards, including the UNICEF Pulcinella Award for Best Educational and Social Film and the Robinson International Short Film Competition Gold.

== Synopsis ==
In the mid-1930, amidst fears of Hitler's treatment of the Jews in Germany, 14-year old Michla (later Michal) Rechter leaves her family, and travels to British Mandatory Palestine – as part of the Zionist movement to create the State of Israel. She is fated never to see her family again, as they fall victim to the Nazi Genocide when their town is conquered with the advent of World War II. Ayala Sharot interviews her grandmother about her childhood in Poland, the antisemitism she experienced, the journey to the Land of Israel and her integration there, as well as the effects of losing her family, and surviving them.

Rechter, 92 years old at the time of the interview, shows and reads essays she wrote as a child in Poland, in perfect Hebrew, describing Israel and a magical and desired place, which she contrasts with the grim reality of her life in Poland; describing Hitler as a dog; and providing other glimpses into her life as a schoolgirl.

When a youth organization representative arrived in their town to find sturdy and enthusiastic young people to take back to Palestine, her family reluctantly sends her to a boarding school in Ben Shemen, and plans to join her later – a plan that never comes to fruition.

In Ben Shemen, Michal, with her classmates, had to learn to shed her diaspora identity in exchange for that of a pioneer, a sabra. Communication with the families left behind becomes more and more difficult, eventually ceasing altogether when the Nazis murder everyone in Rechter's town. Rechter tells her story as she remembers it, without sadness. She is sometimes excited by her prowess in Hebrew as a child, about the Hebrew newspaper her school published, and a song she has not sung in some 80 years. But when asked about her losses, she seems more fatalistic, insisting that those who did not actually go through the Holocaust do not carry its scars, and insists on maintaining an optimistic attitude about life.

== Production ==
According to Sharot, the genesis of Broken Branches was during her time in London, where she studied communication design. She was preoccupied with the subject of emigration and foreignness, as evidenced by her first film, Foreigners, which she made during that time about foreigners living in London, and which was picked up by MTV. Sharot was familiar with her grandmother's life story, but it was only when she herself emigrated and experienced life as a foreigner, did the need to make Rechter's story into a film emerge. When she asked her grandmother to participate, her initial response was, "ask your grandfather, his stories are much more exciting". However, it was this diminution of a story that included so much history and change that interested the filmmaker. Regarding the mostly laconic manner Rechter approaches her story, Sharot says, "This is the main role of the animation in the film – to represent my personal interpretation of her story, with all the emotion I see in it. Even now, after the film has won festivals and been shown all over the world, my grandmother continues to insist that her life story is not unusual. For her, she grew up in a generation where everyone had a story. According to her optimistic outlook, one should not be preoccupied with the past, but to continue to live, and this is what makes her the captivating and fascinating figure she is."

Broken Branches was written, directed, filmed and animated by Sharot, and Produced by The Hive Studio with support from The Rabinowitz Foundation for the Arts, The Israel Film Council (supported by the Israel Ministry of Culture) and Mifal HaPayis.

== Release ==
Broken Branches premiered at the Haifa International Film Festival on October 19, 2014, where it won the award for the Best Short Documentary film. From there the film went on to screenings around the world, picking up multiple awards and acclaim. On April 15, 2015, Broken Branches made its television debut on the Yes Docu channel in the context of Holocaust Memorial Day.

Broken Branches was an official selection at many international film festivals, including:

- Haifa International Film Festival
- Animix International Animation, Comics & Caricature Festival, Tel Aviv
- Dok Leipzig
- Kraków Film Festival
- Klik Animation Festival, Amsterdam
- Cartoons on the Bay, Venice
- Atlanta International Film Festival
- Cleveland International Film Festival
- Animasivo Animation Festival, Mexico City
- Documenta Madrid
- CinéDOC, Tbilisi
- International Human Rights Documentary Film Festival – Docudays UA

As well as many Jewish and Israeli film festivals, such as the Israeli Cinema Festival in Paris, Denver Jewish Film Festival, Palm Beach Jewish Film Festival, Athens Jewish Film Festival, Tucson International Jewish Film Festival, Chicago Israeli Film Festival, Australia Jewish Film Festival, and more.

Musician Daniel Salomon wrote and recorded a ballad called "Broken Branches" inspired by the film.

== Reception ==
In his NRG review, Johnny Dove writes: "[Rechter's] simple story becomes a powerful and convention-shattering experience, with the aid of the surrealistic and pulsating animation that adorns the story of the separation from her parents and her life away from them, until their murder by the Nazis. Sharot and the animation crew behind the film use a rich art style sophistication and turn Rechter's story into an emotional roller coaster made up of dozens of different styles that transform into a mesmerizing flow, depicting a cruel story from a colorful and unique perspective." In the Jerusalem Post, Barry Davis commends the "unique fusion of animation and live action to relate Rechter’s story which touches both on the emotional side and the historical facts", and notes the contrast between Rechter's unemotional and largely dispassionate retelling of her experiences, and Sharot's emotional rendition of the story.

== Awards ==
Year	Award	Category	Result
2014	Haifa International Film Festival	Best Short Documentary	Won
2014	Athens International Film and Video Festival	Best Short Documentary	Won
2014	Israeli Academy Awards (Ophir Award)	Best Short Documentary	Nominated
2014	Dok Leipzig	Golden Dove	Nominated
2014	Kraków Film Festival	Silver Dragon award for best documentary film	Nominated
2014	Israeli Documentary Filmmakers Forum	Best Short	Nominated
2015	Robinson International Short Film Competition	Gold Award	Won
2015	Pulcinella Award – Cartoons on the Bay 2015	Best Educational and Social Film	Won
2015	Cleveland International Film Festival	Best Women's Short	Won
2016	Nice Jewish Film Festival	Mimosa d'Or for Best Short Film	Won
2016	Athens Georgia Jewish Film Festival	Best Short	Won
