= Tal Kantor =

Israeli film director (born 1988)

- טל קנטור
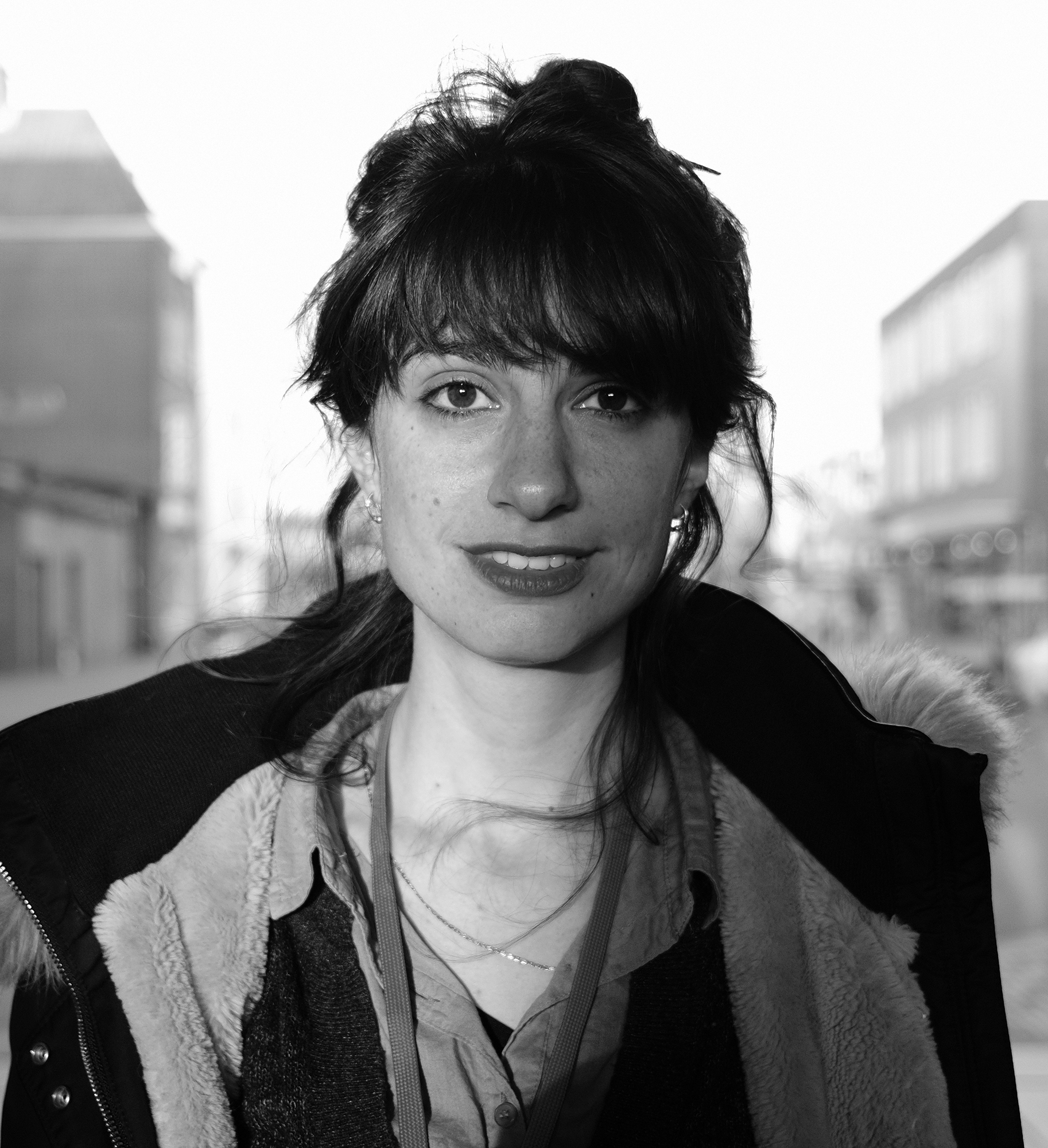
- Born: November 19, 1988 (age 37); Jerusalem
- Citizenship: Israeli
- Education: Bezalel Academy of Arts and Design
- Occupations: Film director; animator
- Known for: Letter to a Pig

Tal Kantor (Hebrew: טל קנטור) is an Oscar-nominated animation filmmaker and visual artist. She is a lecturer in the Screen-based Arts Department at the Bezalel Academy of Arts and Design. She is mostly known for her graduation short film In Other Words and for her debut short film Letter to a Pig (2022), winner of several awards including the Grand Prix in Anima Brussels and the Ophir Award at the Israel Academy Awards.

Kantor is known for her unique filmmaking technique which combines drawing, photography, video, painting, and animation. On January 23rd 2024, she was nominated for the 96th Academy Awards with her film Letter to a Pig (2022).

== Career ==
Kantor studied at the Bezalel Academy of Arts and Design (Screen-Based Arts Department), where she graduated with a Bachelor's degree in 2015. After graduation, Kantor pursued a career as artist and independent filmmaker and animator, working on several documentary feature films as animation director and art director. She has also written, directed and animated several short films, including Letter to a Pig (2022) and Yellow Light (2023).

Kantor has participated in several artist residencies, including the CICLIC ANIMATION residency in Vendôme, France; the Aesthetics and Bias residency in Krakow, Poland and Jerusalem, Israel; the New Arrivals residency in Nijmegen, Netherlands. Her work has also been featured in several exhibitions, including the group exhibition at Miraikan National Museum of Emerging Science and Innovation in Tokyo, presenting the films and art originals of the Japan Media Arts Festival winners. Since 2019, Kantor is also a lecturer at the Bezalel Academy of Arts and Design.

== Filmography ==
- 2015: Under The Small Sun (short film) - co-writer & director with Shahar Davis
- 2016: In Other Words (short film) - writer & director
- 2019: Advocate (documentary feature) - animation art director
- 2021: On This Happy Note (documentary feature) - animation art director
- 2022: Letter to a Pig (short film) - writer & director
- 2022: Five Studies (dance short film) - animation art director & animator
- 2023: Inbal Perlmutter – If You Let Me Go (documentary feature) - art director
- 2023: Yellow Light (short film) - writer & director

== Recognition ==
Her graduation short film In Other Words (2016) has won 17 awards and was officially selected in over 100 festivals worldwide.

In December 2023, Kantor's film Letter to a Pig (2022) was shortlisted for the 96th Academy Awards®. The film has won over 40 awards Including the Grand Prix in Anima Brussels, the Ophir Award at the Israel Academy Awards, the Grand Prize for Best Narrative Short at the Ottawa International Animation Festival, Liv Ullman Peace Prize at Chicago International Children's Film Festival, Grand Prize at Animation Is Film festival.

The documentary feature Advocate (2019), on which Kantor was the animation and art director, won the Emmy Award for Best Documentary at the 42nd News and Documentary Emmy Awards and the 2020 Ophir Award for Best Documentary. The film was also nominated for Best Short Animated Film at the 92nd Academy Awards.
