= Uri Lotan =

Israeli filmmaker

- אורי לוטן
- Born: April 28, 1986 (age 39); Israel
- Citizenship: Israel
- Occupation(s): Director, animator, illustrator
- Known for: Black Slide

Uri Lotan (Hebrew: אורי לוטן; born April 28, 1986) is an Israeli filmmaker. He is mostly known for his Oscar-shortlisted short film Black Slide (2021).

== Life and career ==
Uri Lotan is an animation director based in Tel Aviv, Israel. After graduating from Ringling College of Art and Design with a Bachelors of Fine Art in 2012, he worked on feature films and TV series for Disney, Sony, Imageworks, Netflix and Kuku Studios including the Emmy Award-winning television show Go! Go! Cory Carson as episode director. He worked as an animator on the animated feature Hotel Transylvania 2. Lotan also continued to pursue advertisement work with Hornet, Buck, Eddy and The Hive Studio on a wide range of projects.

== Filmography ==
- The Ballad of Poisonberry Pete (2012)
- Ma'agalim (2016)
- Feeling Sad (2017)
- Black Slide (2021)

== Recognition ==
With Black Slide (2021), Lotan won the Best International Short Film Award at Chilemonos and the Animated Grand Prize at IndyShorts. His student film The Ballad of Poisonberry Pete was nominated for Best Student Film at the 40th Annie Awards. With his short Ma'agalim, he won the Saatachi & Saatachi New Directors Award His short film Feeling Sad earned him an Annie Award nomination for Best Animated Special Production.
