= Daphna Awadish =

Israeli film director

Daphna Awadish Golan
- דפנה אוודיש גולן
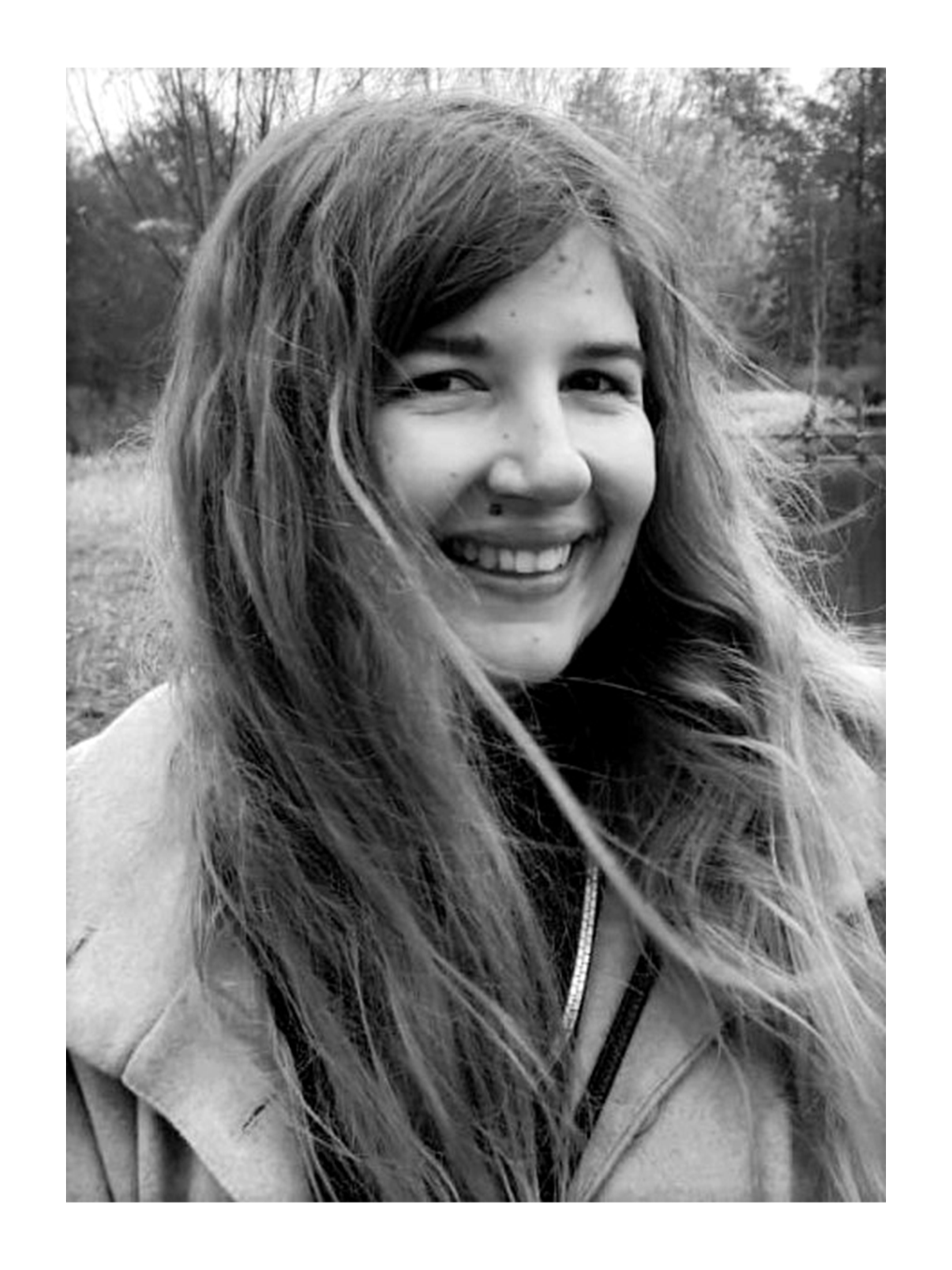
- Citizenship: Israeli; Dutch
- Education: Bezalel Academy of Arts and Design
- Occupations: Film director; Animator; Lecturer
- Known for: Swimming With Wings; Bear with Me; Journey Birds

Daphna Awadish Golan (Hebrew: דפנה אוודיש גולן) is a Dutch-Israeli animator, filmmaker and illustrator based in Amsterdam, Netherlands. She specializes in animated documentaries, in which she employs mixed media techniques to convey personal narratives, often reflecting her diverse experiences living in different countries, which informs her exploration of the concept of "home".

Her 2023 film, Swimming With Wings won the Grand Prix du Jury at the Meknes International Animation Film Festival in Morocco, the ECFA Documentary Film Award at the Olympia International Film Festival.

Daphna's previous short films, Journey Birds and Bear With Me have gained recognition at global festivals, winning accolades such as the Best Animation Award at the Jerusalem Film Festival and the Fantastic Award at the Stuttgart International Festival of Animated Film.

== Career ==
Golan graduated from Bezalel Academy of Art and Design with a Bachelor's degree of Arts and later obtained a master's degree from the St. Joost Master Institute of Visual Cultures. She has contributed to the field of animation both through her films and as a lecturer in the animation department at the Willem de Kooning Academy in Rotterdam. She has also animated the opening for the Miami Jewish Film Festival in 2024.

== Recognition ==
Golan's work has been recognized at multiple international film festivals, where her films have received several accolades. Her animated documentary Swimming with Wings has won over 7 awards and honorable mentions, including the Grand Prix du Jury in Morocco. Her film Bear with Me has won the Best Animation Award at the Jerusalem Film Festival in Israel and the Fantastic Award at the Stuttgart International Festival of Animated Film in Germany. Her unique approach to storytelling through animation has garnered attention, particularly for her exploration of personal and universal themes related to identity and belonging.

== Filmography ==
- Swimming With Wings (2023) - (Short Film)
- Bear with Me (2021) (Short Film)
- Journey Birds (2015) - (Short Film)

== Extra Links ==
- Daphna Awadish at IMDb
- Daphna Awadish Official Website.
- Daphna Awadish in letterboxd.com.
