= Summer Memories =

Canadian animated television series

- Genre: Animation; Surreal comedy Slice-of-life
- Created by: Adam Yaniv
- Based on: A short film by Nickelodeon Animated Shorts Program
- Written by: Sara Peters
- Directed by: Mike West; Adam Yaniv
- Starring: Tricia Black; Adam Yaniv
- Opening theme: "Summer Memories" Theme
- Composers: Paul Fraser; Adam Yaniv; Ido Kashi
- Countries of origin: Canada; Israel
- Original language: English
- No. of episodes: 20 (40 Segments)

Production
- Running time: 3 minutes (pilot); 11 minutes (full series)
- Production companies: A&N Productions Ltd. Aircraft Pictures; Yeti Farm; The Hive Studio; WildBrain Studios

Original release
- Network: Nickelodeon (pilot); Family Channel (Canada); Roku Channel (United States)
- Release: August 12, 2022 – February 24, 2023

Summer Memories is an animated television series created by Adam Yaniv which airs on The Roku Channel In the United States and Cartoon Network in Latin America.

The series was produced by Yaniv's A&N Productions Ltd. in partnership with Aircraft Pictures and Yeti Farm Creative, and premiered on Family Channel in Canada in 2022, followed by ABC in Australia, Amazon Prime in Germany, Showmax in Africa, Roku in the US, and Cartoon Network/HBO in Latin America.

Created by Adam Yaniv, the series stars Tricia Black as the voice of Jason, a young boy who is romanticizing the memories he made with his best friend Ronnie (Yaniv) over what he sees as the most important summer of his life, which was just a few weeks ago. Yaniv based the show on his own childhood and best friend growing up in Raanana, Israel, and has said that the show draws on Israel both visually and verbally to achieve its unique color palette and joke style.

The series is marked by its writers and cast members from Prime-Time Canadian comedy hits such as Schitt's Creek, Kids in the Hall, Run the Burbs, This Hour Has 22 Minutes, TallBoyz and more.

== Synopsis ==
The series follows the time-and-space-bending adventures of best friends Jason and Ronnie as Jason looks back on the most pivotal summer of his life (which was just a few weeks ago).

== Cast ==
The show's voice cast also includes Jason Priestley, Dani Kind, Andrew Phung, Taylor Love, Rashaana Cumberbatch, Andre Sills, Steffi DiDomenicantonio, Rakhee Morzaria, Jonathan Langdon, Tyler Murree, and Cassie Cao.

- Tricia Black as Jason, who is a main protagonist.
- Adam Yaniv as Ronnie, who is Jason's best friend.

== Episodes ==
No.	Title	Original release date
1	All is Lost	August 12, 2022
1	Splitting Hairs	August 12, 2022
2	Self Help	August 12, 2022
2	Time Flies	August 12, 2022
3	Surprise! We Ruined Your Birthday	August 19, 2022
3	Babysitting	August 19, 2022
4	Night Games	August 26, 2022
4	High & Mighty	August 26, 2022
5	Annual Child Awards	September 9, 2022
5	Rainy Day	September 9, 2022
6	Truth or Dare	September 16, 2022
6	Wild Ronnie Blues	September 16, 2022
7	Present Time	September 23, 2022
7	Just Like Old Times	September 23, 2022
8	Lost in Thought	September 30, 2022
8	Old Things, New Problems	September 30, 2022
9	Summer School	October 7, 2022
9	Same Old Song	October 7, 2022
10	A Foot in Both Camps	October 14, 2022
10	A Summer's Hike	October 14, 2022
11	That Ain't the Way I See It	October 21, 2022
11	We're in This Together	October 21, 2022
12	Tall Girl and Tall Boy	October 28, 2022
12	Pretty Good Day	October 28, 2022
13	Summer in the City	November 4, 2022
13	Purple Rock Flower	November 4, 2022
14	Soccer is Life	November 11, 2022
14	Jason Finds His Groove	November 11, 2022
15	Old Stamping Grouds	January 20, 2023
15	Time Without Tim	January 20, 2023
16	Sleepless Again	January 27, 2023
16	Day Before Last	January 27, 2023
17	Heat Wave	February 3, 2023
17	Spaghetti Daze	February 3, 2023
18	Smile Like It's the End of Summer	February 10, 2023
18	Summer Forgetory	February 10, 2023
19	Splitting Pairs	February 17, 2023
19	Bummer Memories	February 17, 2023
20	Summer Breaks	February 24, 2023
20	Till the Winter, My Friend	February 24, 2023

== Awards and nominations ==
Black won the Canadian Screen Award for Best Performance in an Animated Program or Series at the 11th Canadian Screen Awards in 2023.

The show was also nominated for Best Animated Program or Series, and Sara Peters was nominated for Best Writing in an Animated Program or Series for the episode "Truth or Dare".

== Themes, style and narrative arc ==
The series is known for its surreal take on its characters' recollections and playing with points of view, as well as using an unreliable narrator.

Yaniv has said that while he based the show on his own memories growing up, the show is really a meditation on memories as a whole, and the choices people face in shaping their own and others' realities.

Yaniv has said that while he has a story for season 2, "season 1 is its own complete chapter" and has described the world of Jason's memories as a 'nested world-within-a-world infinite universe, where the same moments are viewed through multiple lenses'.
