= Nicktoons =

Animated series brand used by Nickelodeon

Various characters from Nicktoons, as shown in 2013 artwork for the Nickelodeon Animation Studio. From left to right: Leonardo, SpongeBob SquarePants, Craig, Cosmo, Wanda and Bloom.

Nicktoons logo as of present day

Nicktoons is a brand name used by Nickelodeon for their original animated series. Most Nicktoons are produced at the Nickelodeon Animation Studio.

Since its launch in the late 1970s, Nickelodeon's schedule incorporated animated series produced by other companies. The channel did not invest in its own original cartoon series until 1989 when producer Vanessa Coffey visited Los Angeles to accept pitches from local animators. Geraldine Laybourne, the channel's then-president, greenlit three pitches for full series. On August 11, 1991, the three cartoons premiered as part of a 90-minute block, becoming the first branded Nicktoons. In contrast to the merchandise-based cartoons that dominated the 1980s animation industry, Vanessa Coffey and Geraldine Laybourne agreed that the Nicktoons should be creator-driven: based on original characters designed by animators.

The first Nicktoons debuted to financial success, convincing Viacom to invest in original animated shows for its other network MTV. Until 1998, Nickelodeon's animation division operated out of a rented office complex in Studio City, California. Production moved to an individual building in nearby Burbank on March 4, 1998. Among the first shows produced at this new facility was SpongeBob SquarePants, which by 2004 had become the most profitable Nickelodeon program. In 2002, a cable channel also called Nicktoons was launched, followed by multiple international versions. Several original shows have premiered new episodes on the channel.

In the early 2010s, Nickelodeon debuted the first two Nicktoons based on preexisting television franchises, as opposed to new characters: Teenage Mutant Ninja Turtles and Winx Club. These two revamped shows were developed at Nickelodeon Animation Studio following Viacom's purchases of both properties. In 2019, Nick Animation debuted its first streaming-exclusive Nicktoon, Pinky Malinky, which was released on Netflix rather than television. Several months later, the studio announced a multi-year deal to produce animated content for Netflix, including new properties and spin-offs of previous Nicktoons.

== History ==
=== 1979–1988: Early efforts ===
Nickelodeon's first original animated program, Video Dream Theatre, was left unaired. It was produced over a half-year period in 1979, when the network hired its future president Geraldine Laybourne to make two pilots for the show. Video Dream Theatre used animation to visualize children's dreams in different styles, such as color Xerox. According to an interview with Laybourne herself, Nickelodeon did not broadcast the show because it was deemed too frightening; she commented, "the trouble with kids' dreams is they're really scary. It's a lot about abandonment, it's a lot about suffocation. They don't make very good stories."

The network did not have its own original animated series, and mainly aired animated shows from other companies. Two years before the launch of the brand, the network had a compilation show titled Looney Tunes on Nickelodeon. The network continued to only broadcast externally produced animation until almost a decade later, when animator Ralph Bakshi pitched an original animated series called Tattertown. In 1988, a half-hour pilot episode was produced, overseen by Debby Beece (Nickelodeon's senior vice president of programming). Nickelodeon declined to pick up a full series, and the pilot "Christmas in Tattertown" premiered on December 21, 1988, as a standalone Christmas special. The network's next attempt at an original animation was Nick's Thanksgiving Fest, which was composed of two shorts. According to Linda Simensky, the Thanksgiving shorts "gave Nickelodeon executives the confidence they needed to get the animation department started".

During production of Nick's Thanksgiving Fest in 1989, Geraldine Laybourne held a meeting at her house to develop a philosophy for the channel's original cartoons. She played tapes of current animated shows, which her colleagues viewed as merchandise-driven and overly commercial. The group decided that Nickelodeon should aim for the opposite of their contemporaries, producing cartoons that would keep their creators in a key creative role rather than prioritizing an efficient "assembly line" process.

=== 1988–1998: First Nicktoons and success ===
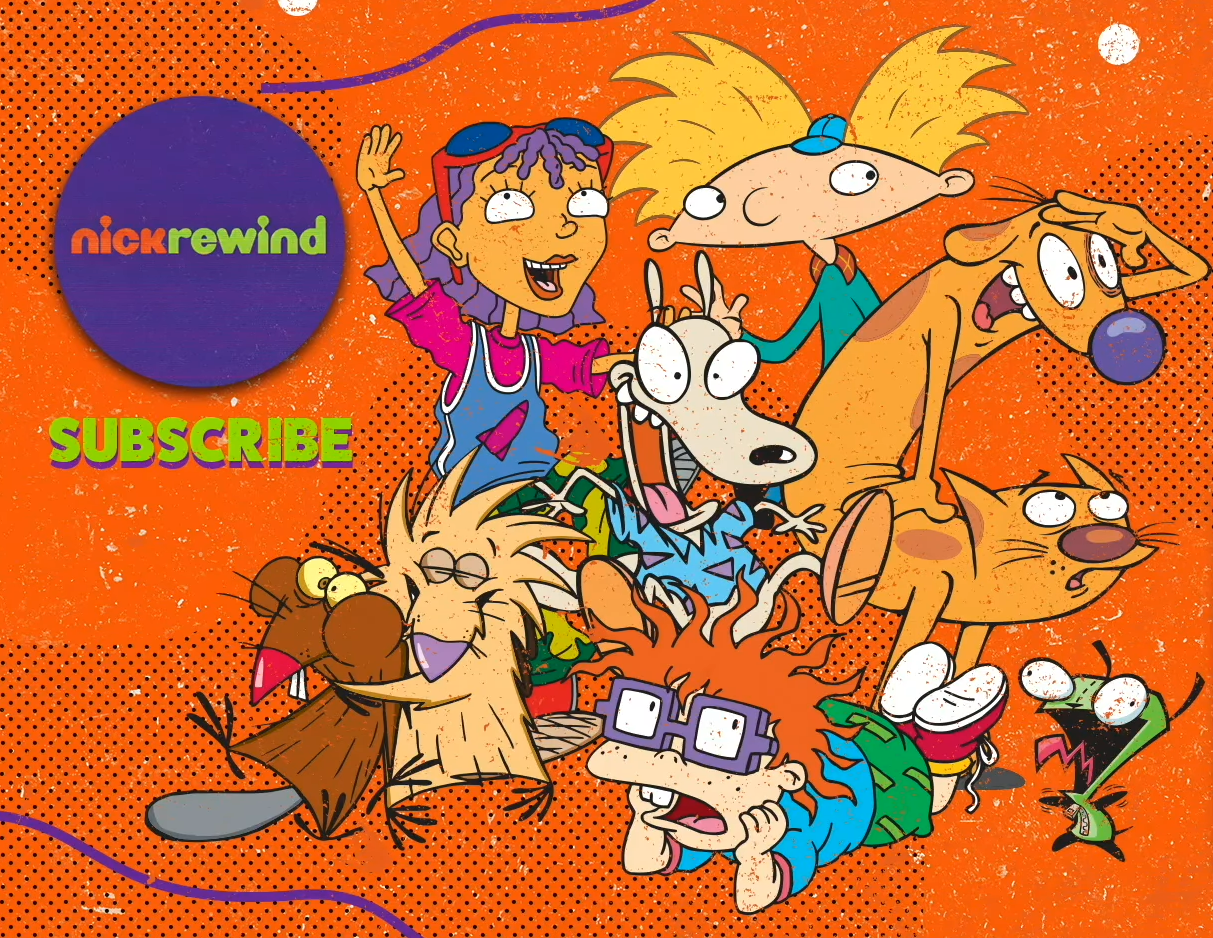
Various characters from Nicktoons aired in the 1990s, during the peak of the brand's popularity, and the early 2000s. Clockwise from the top: Arnold from Hey Arnold!, Dog and Cat from CatDog, GIR from Invader Zim, Chuckie from Rugrats, Norbert and Daggett from The Angry Beavers, and Reggie from Rocket Power. Rocko from Rocko's Modern Life is in the center.

Everybody else was doing toy-driven stuff and it was garbage. It's hard to create a character out of a toy for a lot of reasons. You have limited time to produce because you have to get the thing out when the product hits the market. How about, instead, we do this radical thing of looking around the country for animators who have great characters living inside them?

— Nickelodeon president Geraldine Laybourne

Geraldine Laybourne laid out a set of rules for the network's cartoons, most importantly wanting to "put the creator back, front and center." She approached her fellow executive Vanessa Coffey to find artists in Los Angeles interested in pitching original cartoons. Coffey had experience working in animation and was the producer for Nick's Thanksgiving Fest in 1988. Laybourne gave Coffey "pretty much free rein to look for properties".

Vanessa Coffey rented an apartment in Los Angeles for two weeks and accepted hourly pitches. She mailed animators a call for submissions, which she summarized as "I'm looking for ideas, I'm looking for concepts. The less developed, the better. I want drawings, not a big pitch." As Coffey accepted pitches, she decided that she did not want a "consistent look like Disney", specifically searching for projects that had completely different styles from each other.

Of the pitches she accepted, Coffey decided to approve eight six-minute pilots at a cost of $100,000 each. Laybourne would eventually select three pilots to expand into full series, which were Doug, Rugrats, and The Ren & Stimpy Show. meant to fill a programming block of an hour and a half. The first Nicktoon that Coffey approved was Jim Jinkins' Doug, followed by Arlene Klasky and Gabor Csupo's Rugrats. The final pitch that went to series came from John Kricfalusi, who presented a variety show titled Your Gang with a live-action host presenting different cartoons, each cartoon parodying a different genre. Ren and Stimpy were pets of one of the children in Your Gang. Coffey was dissatisfied with most of the pitch but did like Ren and Stimpy, singling them out for their own series. Both Coffey and Laybourne allowed the three shows to enter development. Between the pilots and series' production, Vanessa Coffey was named Nickelodeon's Vice President of Animation.

In fall 1992, Nickelodeon fired John Kricfalusi. Coffey and Laybourne asserted that Kricfalusi was in breach of contract for not delivering on time, creating inappropriate content, and going over budget. Kricfalusi suspected the real reason was that the network was uncomfortable with more crude humor. After Kricfalusi and Nickelodeon missed several promised new-episode delivery and air dates, the network—which had purchased the rights to the Ren & Stimpy characters from Kricfalusi—negotiated a settlement with him. Production on Ren & Stimpy moved to Nickelodeon's animation department, Games Animation, and the show was put under the creative supervision of Bob Camp. Coffey soon stepped down as animation vice president for Nickelodeon to pursue her own projects. She was replaced by Mary Harrington, a Nickelodeon producer who moved out from New York to help run the Nicktoons division after Kricfalusi was fired.

At the time, the Nicktoons were produced primarily out-of-house at Jumbo Pictures (Doug) and Klasky Csupo (Rugrats), with Nickelodeon's executives overseeing development. Hoping to concentrate production under one roof, Nickelodeon greenlit its first fully-in-house series, Rocko's Modern Life, in 1992. A budget freeze in 1995 at Viacom, caused by acquisition of Paramount Communications, resulted in Ren & Stimpy being canceled that same year and the network passing on the final 13 episodes of their option for Doug. Jinkins sold Jumbo Pictures to Disney in 1996, moving Doug over to ABC and Toon Disney as a result. Nickelodeon retained the rights to the 52 episodes produced between 1991 and 1994 as a part of the agreement. Rugrats was cancelled by the network in 1994, but would later be revived as two holiday specials about Hanukkah and The Passover before being revived in 1997 and airing until 2004. From that moment on, relationship between Nickelodeon and Klasky-Csupo would later continue until 2006, with 1994’s Aaahh!!! Real Monsters (which focuses on monsters Ickis, Krumm and Oblina, who attend a school for monsters underneath a dump where they learn to scare humans), 1998’s The Wild Thornberrys (which focuses on Eliza Thornberry who obtains a special power where she could talk to animals while traveling with her family on her father Nigel’s nature show), 1999’s Rocket Power (which focuses on four kids; Otto, Reggie, Twister and Sam, who play extreme sports in their California hometown, 2000’s As Told by Ginger (which features Ginger Foutley, a young junior high (later high school) girl attempting to be popular alongside her best friends Dodie and Macie while documenting it in her journal), 2003’s All Grown Up! (a Rugrats spinoff originating from a 2001 special All Growed Up, which featured the characters as preteens), and 2005’s Rugrats Pre-School Daze (the second Rugrats spinoff based on an episode of the show that focuses on Angelica Pickles and Susie Carmichael attending preschool (this show remained unaired in the U.S. until 2008)).

=== 1998–2008: New studio and building new brands ===
In 1996, Albie Hecht, then-president of Film and TV Entertainment for Nickelodeon, met with Nickelodeon artists to brainstorm an idea for a new Nicktoons studio. Nickelodeon's new facility, named Nickelodeon Animation Studio, would eventually open on March 4, 1998; Hecht said, "For me, this building is the physical manifestation of a personal dream, which is that when people think of cartoons, they'll say Nicktoons."

In June 1997, Nickelodeon began a five-year, $350 million investment into original animation. As part of this effort, the company doubled its animation staff and produced many new pilots, including one for SpongeBob SquarePants. Before commissioning SpongeBob SquarePants as a full series, Nickelodeon executives insisted that it would not be popular unless the main character was a child who went to school, with his teacher as a main character. The show's creator, Stephen Hillenburg, recalled in 2012 that Nickelodeon told him, "Our winning formula is animation about kids in school... We want you to put SpongeBob in school." Hillenburg was ready to "walk out" on Nickelodeon and abandon the series, since he wanted SpongeBob to be an adult character. He eventually compromised by adding a new character to the main cast, Mrs. Puff, who is a boat-driving teacher. Hillenburg was happy with the compromise and said, "A positive thing for me that came out of it was [how it brought] in a new character, Mrs. Puff, who I love."

According to Nickelodeon writer Micah Wright, the series pickups for both SpongeBob and CatDog were announced on the same day in 1997. Nickelodeon's senior vice president, Kevin Kay, confirmed to the animation studio's creative team that it had greenlit 100 episodes (200 individual segments) of CatDog and six episodes (twelve segments) of SpongeBob. Nickelodeon believed CatDog had the potential to be its next breakout hit, and their order represented an investment of $50 million into the series alone. Stephen Hillenburg was doubtful that his show would last, and he stated in 2009: "I was thinking if we could make a pilot, then we'd have one episode and have accomplished that. Then I thought if it did go to a full season that we'd get twelve chances to write stories and that might be it... that we'd make twelve shows and get canceled."

In 1998, Nickelodeon premiered Oh Yeah! Cartoons, which was intended as a "character laboratory" to test out cartoon characters. Creator Fred Seibert described the show as an experiment into a seven-minute format that Nickelodeon generally avoided; he said, "they were very willing to try an experiment to see how it would work." The series eventually yielded three half-hour spin-offs based on segments from the show: The Fairly OddParents, ChalkZone, and My Life as a Teenage Robot. 1998 also marked the release of the first feature film based on a Nicktoon: The Rugrats Movie, which became the first non-Disney animated film to gross over $100 million at the North American box office. On December 8, Nickelodeon's movie division greenlit theatrical adaptations of Hey Arnold! and The Wild Thornberrys, less than a month after Rugrats opened in theaters.

At the turn of the millennium, Nickelodeon noticed that a new competitor, Cartoon Network, was attracting some of its 11–15 year old demographic. Desiring a cartoon suited for older viewers, Nickelodeon producer Mary Harrington contacted Jhonen Vasquez for a series pitch after reading his Squee! comic books. Vasquez pitched Invader Zim, which satisfied Nickelodeon's requests for "something 'edgy'."

In the early 2000s, Nickelodeon briefly continued its strategy of adapting Nicktoon franchises into theatrical features. Executives at the company's movie division decided to reconsider this approach after several films (Hey Arnold!: The Movie and Rugrats Go Wild) were met with poor financial and critical reception. According to the Chicago Tribune, Nickelodeon believed the Hey Arnold! movie "didn't just fail but actually tarnished one of the company's best selling points: its trustworthy brand name." Aside from SpongeBob SquarePants films, Nickelodeon Movies stopped producing animated theatrical features based on their shows.

In February 2005, high ratings from Butch Hartman's two Nicktoons (The Fairly OddParents and Danny Phantom) convinced the network to sign a multi-year deal with Hartman. As part of the agreement, Hartman developed original animated and live-action concepts for Nickelodeon and its sister channel, Noggin. In a statement, Hartman said, "Working with everyone at Nickelodeon over the past several years has been hugely satisfying and I look forward to forging the same kind of terrific creative alliances with the folks at Noggin".

Nickelodeon also sought out a new action-adventure cartoon after commissioning several anime-inspired pilots that "didn't go anywhere", according to a New York Times article. By 2002, Nickelodeon had rejected multiple Japanese series, considering them derivative or too mature for the channel's target audience. In response, Bryan Konietzko and Michael Dante DiMartino pitched Avatar: The Last Airbender, and Nickelodeon ordered six episodes of the show. Avatar premiered in February 2005 to high ratings, after which Nickelodeon increased its order to 13 episodes and again to 20.

=== 2008–2019: Rebranding and reviving older properties ===
In October 2006, DreamWorks Animation (who was then in a distribution deal with Nickelodeon's corporate sister Paramount Pictures) announced that it would partner to co-produce animated shows with the channel. The partnership resulted in three CGI-animated shows based on DreamWorks' character library: The Penguins of Madagascar (2008), Kung Fu Panda: Legends of Awesomeness (2011), and Monsters vs. Aliens (2013).

In October 2009 and September 2010, respectively, Viacom brought Teenage Mutant Ninja Turtles and Winx Club into the Nickelodeon family by purchasing both franchises. Nickelodeon Animation Studio produced a new CGI-animated Turtles series and new seasons of Winx Club with CGI sequences. TMNT and Winx were both inducted into the Nicktoons franchise after Nickelodeon launched them. The two productions comprised Nickelodeon's strategy to reboot two established brands for new viewers: TMNT was intended to reach an audience of boys aged 6 to 11, and Winx was aimed at the same age group of girls. In February 2011, Viacom bought out a third of Rainbow SpA, the Italian animation studio that introduced Winx Club. The purchase was valued at 62 million euros (US$83 million) and led to new shows being co-developed by Rainbow and Nickelodeon, including Club 57 and a pilot for the Nickelodeon Animated Shorts Program called "Crazy Block".

In the early 2010s, Nickelodeon executives searched for independent animations on the Internet, looking for original ideas. Chris Viscardi, who would later become Nickelodeon Animation's senior vice president, stated that the studio desired to "[get] back to more creator-driven things." Nickelodeon eventually came across two animations they enjoyed: The Forest City Rockers (a short series by Jay Howell and Jim Dirschberger) and Breadwinners (a stand-alone short by Gary DiRaffaele and Steve Borst). Howell and Dirschberger were recruited to develop Sanjay and Craig while DiRaffaele and Borst were asked to expand their Breadwinners short into a full series. Sanjay and Craig premiered first, on May 25, 2013. After its debut, Los Angeles Times critic Robert Lloyd optimistically compared the show to the Nicktoons of the 1990s, writing that "the goofy and delightful series ... represents a positive step back for the network to where it once belonged."

In the late 2010s, Nickelodeon revived three existing Nicktoons IP as one-off movies, including Hey Arnold!: The Jungle Movie, Rocko's Modern Life: Static Cling, and Invader Zim: Enter the Florpus. The first aired on the Nickelodeon channel in November 2017, while the latter two premiered in August 2019 on Netflix. Jhonen Vasquez, the creator of Invader Zim, stated in 2019 that the studio's support for the revival films waned due to a shift in management: "We had an immense amount of support throughout most of the production. Things just turn on a dime, people get axed, new people come in."

=== 2019–present: Expanding beyond cable ===
In 2019, Nickelodeon began to shift from focusing only on cable broadcasting to what it describes as a "studio model" that provides content for third-party companies. The decision was made based on the sharp decline of cable viewership due to the rise of streaming services. As part of this strategy, Nickelodeon announced that the series Pinky Malinky would release on Netflix as "the first straight-to-Netflix Nicktoon". The series premiered on the platform on January 1, 2019. On November 13, 2019, Nickelodeon expanded their relationship with Netflix with the announcement of a multi-year output deal, under which Nickelodeon Animation Studio will produce "original animated feature films and TV series based on both new and existing IP". On February 21, 2020, Nickelodeon's Glitch Techs premiered on Netflix, becoming the second Nicktoon to receive a digital-only release.

== List of Nicktoons ==
Note: Animated series made for Nickelodeon's other brands (namely Nick Jr. and Nick at Nite) are not included in this list.

=== Precursors ===
Title	Premiere date
Video Dream Theatre	Produced from 1979 to 1980; unaired
Christmas in Tattertown	December 21, 1988
Nick's Thanksgiving Fest	November 22, 1989

=== Full series ===
#	Title	Seasons	Episodes	Premiere date	Finale date
1	Doug (Note: Nickelodeon produced seasons 1–4. In 1996, Disney acquired the series and produced three additional seasons.)	4	52	August 11, 1991	January 2, 1994
2	Rugrats	9	172	August 11, 1991	August 1, 2004
3	The Ren & Stimpy Show (Note: This list does not include the Ren & Stimpy "Adult Party Cartoon" spin-off, as it was not produced under the Nickelodeon brand. In August 2020, the Paramount-owned network Comedy Central green-lit a reboot of the series, which is also not included on this list.)	5	52	August 11, 1991	December 16, 1995
4	Rocko's Modern Life	4	52	September 18, 1993	November 24, 1996
5	Aaahh!!! Real Monsters	4	52	October 29, 1994	November 16, 1997
6	Hey Arnold!	5	100	October 7, 1996	June 8, 2004
7	KaBlam!	4	48	October 11, 1996	May 27, 2000
8	The Angry Beavers	4	62	April 19, 1997	August 27, 2006
9	CatDog	4	68	April 4, 1998	June 15, 2005
10	Oh Yeah! Cartoons	3	34	July 18, 1998	August 30, 2002
11	The Wild Thornberrys	5	91	September 1, 1998	June 11, 2004
12	SpongeBob SquarePants	17	343	May 1, 1999	present
13	Rocket Power	4	71	August 16, 1999	July 30, 2004
14	As Told by Ginger	3	60	October 25, 2000	November 14, 2006
15	The Fairly OddParents	10	172	March 30, 2001	July 26, 2017
16	Invader Zim	2	27	March 30, 2001	August 19, 2006
17	Action League Now!	1	12	November 18, 2001	February 10, 2002
18	ChalkZone	4	40	March 22, 2002	August 23, 2008
19	The Adventures of Jimmy Neutron, Boy Genius	3	61	July 20, 2002	November 25, 2006
20	All Grown Up!	5	55	April 12, 2003	August 17, 2008
21	My Life as a Teenage Robot	3	40	August 1, 2003	May 2, 2009
22	Danny Phantom	3	53	April 3, 2004	August 24, 2007
23	Avatar: The Last Airbender	3	61	February 21, 2005	July 19, 2008
24	Catscratch	1	20	July 9, 2005	February 10, 2007
25	The X's	1	20	November 25, 2005	November 25, 2006
26	El Tigre: The Adventures of Manny Rivera	1	26	February 19, 2007	September 13, 2008
27	Tak and the Power of Juju	1	26	August 31, 2007	January 24, 2009
28	Back at the Barnyard	2	52	September 29, 2007	November 12, 2011
29	The Mighty B!	2	40	April 26, 2008	June 18, 2011
30	The Penguins of Madagascar (Note: Co-produced by Nickelodeon Animation Studio and DreamWorks Animation. DreamWorks owns the characters and other elements in the show while Paramount retains half of the show's copyright.)	3	80	November 28, 2008	December 19, 2015
31	Random! Cartoons (Note: Premiered exclusively on Nicktoons Network.)	1	13	December 6, 2008	December 20, 2009
32	Fanboy & Chum Chum	2	52	October 12, 2009	July 12, 2014
33	Planet Sheen	1	26	October 2, 2010	February 15, 2013
34	T.U.F.F. Puppy	3	60	October 2, 2010	April 4, 2015
35	Winx Club (Note: Nickelodeon Animation Studio produced the Winx Club revival series, made up of seasons 5–7, in co-development with Rainbow. Paramount owns the copyright to these seasons and, until 2023, co-owned the Rainbow studio itself.)	3	78	June 27, 2011	April 10, 2016
36	Kung Fu Panda: Legends of Awesomeness	3	80	September 19, 2011	June 29, 2016
37	The Legend of Korra	4	52	April 14, 2012	December 19, 2014
38	Robot and Monster	1	26	August 4, 2012	March 4, 2015
39	Teenage Mutant Ninja Turtles (Note: Viacom acquired the Teenage Mutant Ninja Turtles franchise in 2009. Viacom owns the copyright to both the 2012 series, Rise of the Teenage Mutant Ninja Turtles, and Tales of the Teenage Mutant Ninja Turtles along with the 1987 series and the 4Kids-produced 2003 series. The Next Mutation are owned by other external parties.)	5	124	September 28, 2012	November 12, 2017
40	Monsters vs. Aliens	1	26	March 23, 2013	February 8, 2014
41	Sanjay and Craig	3	60	May 25, 2013	July 29, 2016
42	Breadwinners	2	40	February 17, 2014	September 12, 2016
43	Harvey Beaks	2	52	March 28, 2015	December 29, 2017
44	Pig Goat Banana Cricket	2	40	July 16, 2015	August 11, 2018
45	The Loud House	10	315	May 2, 2016	present
46	Bunsen Is a Beast	1	26	January 16, 2017	February 10, 2018
47	Welcome to the Wayne	2	30	July 24, 2017	May 31, 2019
48	The Adventures of Kid Danger	1	10	January 15, 2018	June 14, 2018
49	Rise of the Teenage Mutant Ninja Turtles	2	39	July 20, 2018	August 7, 2020
50	Pinky Malinky (Note: Premiered exclusively on Netflix. Each episode is separated into 11-minute segments on the streaming platform and count as individual episodes.)	3	60	January 1, 2019	July 17, 2019
51	The Casagrandes	3	60	October 14, 2019	September 30, 2022
52	It's Pony	2	40	January 18, 2020	May 26, 2022
53	Glitch Techs (Note: Premiered exclusively on Netflix.)	2	19	February 21, 2020	August 17, 2020
54	Kamp Koral: SpongeBob's Under Years (Note: Premiered first on Paramount+ in March 2021 before airing on Nickelodeon the following month.)	2	39	March 4, 2021	July 10, 2024
55	Rugrats (Note: CGI reboot of the original 1991 series. Premiered on Paramount+ before airing on Nickelodeon for the first time on August 20, 2021.)	2	46	May 27, 2021	June 14, 2026
56	The Patrick Star Show	6	81	July 9, 2021	present
57	Middlemost Post	2	33	July 9, 2021	October 21, 2022
58	Star Trek: Prodigy (Note: Premiered on Paramount+ before airing on Nickelodeon.)	2	40	October 28, 2021	July 1, 2024
59	Big Nate	2	52	February 17, 2022	August 26, 2024
60	Monster High	2	50	October 6, 2022	October 24, 2024
61	Transformers: EarthSpark	3	44	November 11, 2022	December 5, 2025
62	Rock Paper Scissors	3	40	February 11, 2024	October 12, 2026
63	The Fairly OddParents: A New Wish	1	20	May 17, 2024	August 8, 2024
64	Tales of the Teenage Mutant Ninja Turtles	2	24	August 9, 2024	December 12, 2025
65	Max & the Midknights	4	40	October 30, 2024	October 23, 2026
66	Wylde Pak	2	26	June 6, 2025	April 10, 2026
67	Avatar: Seven Havens	1	13	October 9, 2026	present

=== Miniseries ===
#	Title	Episodes	Premiere date	Finale date
1	Making Fiends	6	October 4, 2008	November 1, 2008
2	Rugrats Pre-School Daze	4	November 16, 2008	December 7, 2008
3	Middle School Moguls	4	September 2, 2019	September 29, 2019

=== Upcoming ===
Title	Premiere date	Sources

== See also ==
- List of programs broadcast by Nickelodeon
- Nicktoons (American TV channel)
- Cartoon Cartoons - a collective brand used for Cartoon Network
- The Disney Afternoon - a syndicated block of Disney Channel cartoons

== Bibliography ==
- Hendershot, Heather, ed. (2004). Nickelodeon Nation: The History, Politics, and Economics of America's Only TV Channel for Kids. New York: New York University Press. ISBN 0-8147-3652-1.
