= List of Breadwinners episodes =

Breadwinners is an American animated television series produced by Nickelodeon. A preview of the series, marketed as a "sneak beak", aired on February 17, 2014. The series began airing in its regular timeslot on February 22, 2014.

On May 8, 2014, it was announced that the series had been picked up for a second season of 20 episodes.

== Series overview ==
Season	Segments	Episodes		Originally released		
Season	Segments	Episodes		First released	Last released	Network
Pilot				August 22, 2012		YouTube
1	38	20		February 17, 2014	April 26, 2015	Nickelodeon
2	17	20 (Note: 39 segments total)	9	April 5, 2015	December 11, 2015	Nickelodeon
2	22	20	11	April 18, 2016	September 12, 2016	Nicktoons

== Episodes ==
=== Pilot (2012) ===
Title	Written and directed by	Original release date
"Breadwinners"	Gary "Doodles" DiRaffale and Steve Borst	August 22, 2012
SwaySway teaches Buhdeuce how to drive the rocket van.

=== Season 1 (2014–15) ===
No. overall	No. in season	Title	Directed by	Written by	Storyboarded by	Original release date	Prod. code	US viewers (millions)
1a	1a	"Thug Loaf"	Gary Doodles	Steve Borst and Gary Doodles	Casey Burke Leonard	February 17, 2014	101	2.82
SwaySway and Buhdeuce get a delivery, but they must deliver the bread to the bad part of Duck Town, the Lower Yeast Side. Soon, a group of biker ducks find them and start to chase them. These biker ducks want Buhdeuce as their leader. Buhdeuce is proud of himself when he finally saves the two of them from the bikers with his butt.
1b	1b	"Mine All Mine"	Chris Martin	Steve Borst	Adriel Garcia, Ken McIntyre, and Brian Morante	February 17, 2014	103	2.82
SwaySway and Buhdeuce meet a legendary being named "The Bread Maker" when they find a mysterious toaster in the bread mines. Problems arise after they start pestering the Bread Maker with nonsensical and downright "quazy" (crazy) questions. Guest Star: Vanessa Marshall as Intercom Lady
2a	2a	"Stank Breath"	Dave Stone	Mike Yank	Jeremy Bernstein, Robert Iza, and MJ Sandhe	February 22, 2014	104	2.68
When Buhdeuce eats bad bread from the "Stanky Dank" cave, he must deal with not only unpleasant, but also aggressive "stank" breath. This breath upsets almost everyone that goes near Buhdeuce. In the end, "stank bread" comes in handy to defeat a Stankasaurus to get Minty Fresh Bread that will cure the "stank breath."
2b	2b	"Frog Day Afternoon"	Casey Burke Leonard	Steve Borst	Jim Mortensen, Bryan Newton, and Mike Nordstrom	February 22, 2014	102	2.68
SwaySway and Buhdeuce teach their pet frog Jelly how to fetch. Jelly accidentally fetches a monster egg that hatches. The Breadwinners take care of the baby monster until its large, angry mother comes looking for it. Guest Star: April Winchell as Mama Monster
3a	3a	"Employee of the Month"	Chris Martin	Steve Borst, Gary Doodles, and Dani Michaeli	Adriel Garcia, Ken McIntyre, and Brian Morante	March 1, 2014	106	2.38
SwaySway gives out the first Employee of the Month Award to the Rocket Van. This upsets Buhdeuce so he proves to SwaySway that he's a better Breadwinner than the Rocket Van is.
3b	3b	"Brocrastination"	Casey Burke Leonard	Story by : Russ Carney & Ron Corcillo; Teleplay by : Steve Borst	Jim Mortensen, Bryan Newton, and Mike Nordstrom	March 1, 2014	105	2.38
SwaySway and Buhdeuce have to take care of a pile of dirty dishes, but they do not want to, so they think of creative ways to procrastinate. Soon after playing a dish-washing video game, "Turbo Washer 2000," they discover that chores can be fun.
4a	4a	"Rocket Trouble"	Dave Stone	Russ Carney & Ron Corcillo	Jeremy Bernstein, Robert Iza, and MJ Sandhe	March 8, 2014	107	2.28
SwaySway and Buhdeuce's good friend Ketta keeps modifying the Rocket Van so they can deliver bread faster, but they keep falling further behind schedule. She then creates two robot clones of SwaySway and Buhdeuce, Sway3po and B2D2, who try to replace the now "obsolete" SwaySway and Buhdeuce.
4b	4b	"The Brave and the Mold"	Casey Burke Leonard	Ben Gruber	Jim Mortensen, Bryan Newton, and Mike Nordstrom	March 8, 2014	108	2.28
After mold strikes the bread mines, the Breadwinners have to figure out how to deliver bread from an increasingly diminished supply. The only way to cure the bread of its mold is to pull out the Emerald Loaf. SwaySway and Buhdeuce learn about teamwork along the way. Guest Star: David Blue as Nibbles
5a	5a	"Lost at Pond"	Dave Stone	Derek Dressler	Jeremy Bernstein, Robert Iza, and MJ Sandhe	March 15, 2014	110	2.84
SwaySway and Buhdeuce are stranded in the middle of Great Pond. A cruise finds them, but when Buhdeuce levels up as a survival duck, he gets stuck that way. SwaySway manages to bring the two home, and Buhdeuce reverted from cave-duck to his normal self after Jelly licks him.
5b	5b	"From Bad to Nurse"	Chris Martin	Thomas Krajewski	Adriel Garcia, Ken McIntyre, Brian Morante, and Miguel Puga	March 15, 2014	109	2.84
SwaySway and Buhdeuce attempt to nurse their best customer, T-Midi, back to health.
6a	6a	"Love Loaf"	Ken McIntyre	Rick Groel	Jim Mortensen, Bryan Newton, and Mike Nordstrom	March 22, 2014	111	2.21
SwaySway and Buhdeuce find a "love loaf", a magical loaf of bread that makes anyone who eats it fall in love with the first person they see. SwaySway wants to use it to get his crush, Jenny Quackles, to fall in love with him, but she is away at an all-girls summer camp. The Breadwinners level up to girly ducks to get into the camp.
6b	6b	"Beach Day of Horror"	Chris Martin	Steve Borst and Russ Carney & Ron Corcillo	Adriel Garcia, Brian Morante, and Miguel Puga	March 22, 2014	112	2.21
A monster threatens SwaySway and Buhdeuce's plans to have a day at the beach.
7a	7a	"Quazy for Vanessa"	Ken McIntyre	Ben Gruber, Steve Borst, and Gary Doodles	Robert Iza, Jim Mortenson, and Mike Nordstrom	May 31, 2014	114	1.90
SwaySway and Buhdeuce disguise their Rocket Van as a girl, "Vanessa," to prevent it from being stolen by Oonski the Great, a rough and tumble beaver Viking who will do anything to get his hands on the Rocket Van. Unfortunately, Oonski falls in love with "Vanessa," and the Breadwinners must take action.
7b	7b	"Tunnel of Fear"	Ken Mcintyre	Ben Gruber, Steve Borst, and Gary Doodles	Jeremy Bernstein, Robert Iza, Rob Lilly, and MJ Sandhe	May 31, 2014	113	1.90
SwaySway and Buhdeuce accidentally visit a scary part of the bread mines known as the Tunnel of Fear when they take Jelly to their mining job. Once inside the cursed area of the mine, the Breadwinners must face their fears and rescue Jelly. Guest Stars: Robert Cait as French Chef and Clown, Jonathan Renoni as Tunnel of Fear
8a	8a	"Driver's Breaducation"	Chris Martin	Russ Carney & Ron Corcillo	Adriel Garcia, Brian Morante, and Miguel Puga	June 7, 2014	115	2.03
SwaySway and Buhdeuce have to attend Rambamboo's strict driving school after violating driving rules. They don't pass their test at first, but Rambamboo may think otherwise when SwaySway actually drives Buhdeuce to rescue Rambamboo.
8b	8b	"Food Fight Club"	Dave Stone	Rick Groel, Steve Borst, and Gary Doodles	Jeremy Bernstein, Rob Lilly, and MJ Sandhe	June 7, 2014	116	2.03
SwaySway and Buhdeuce join a food fight club when thugs from the Lower Yeast Side steal all their bread and use it as weapons. Unfortunately, the boys have to fight each other in order to escape.
9a	9a	"Diner Ducks"	Ken McIntyre	Story by : Ben Gruber; Teleplay by : Steve Borst	Robert Iza, Jim Mortenson, and Mike Nordstrom	June 14, 2014	117	N/A
SwaySway and Buhdeuce treat Jelly to lunch at the flying diner, Pumpers, but when they order three of everything and fail to pay they must serve the tricky customers at Pumpers. Meanwhile, Jelly takes the Rocket Van for a spin.
9b	9b	"Switcheroo"	Chris Martin and Ken McIntyre	Steve Borst	Adriel Garcia, Brian Morante, and Miguel Puga	June 14, 2014	118	N/A
SwaySway and Buhdeuce swap bodies when they eat a loaf of Switcheroo bread. In order to get their bodies back they must eat another loaf before the effects become permanent.
10a	10a	"Introducktions"	Ken McIntyre	Gene Grillo	Robert Iza, Jim Mortenson, and Mike Nordstrom	September 20, 2014	123	1.98
SwaySway and Buhdeuce take T-Midi to the bread mines to introduce their number one customer to the Bread Maker.
10b	10b	"Fowl Feud"	Chris Martin	Bill Motz & Bob Roth	Adriel Garcia, Pez Hofman, and Brian Morante	September 20, 2014	124	1.98
After destroying each other's belongings, Swaysway and Buhdeuce are no longer best friends. They engage in a Breadwinner battle to see who can deliver the most bread and make the most customers happy.
11a	11a	"Insane in the Crane Game"	Dave Stone	Kevin Maher and Steve Borst	Jeremy Bernstein, Rob Lilly, and MJ Sandhe	September 27, 2014	119	1.7
After Oonksi wins Buhduece as a prize in a crane game, SwaySway must rescue his friend from being destroyed.
11b	11b	"Buhdeuce Goes Berserks"	Ken McIntyre	Bill Motz & Bob Roth	Robert Iza, Jim Mortenson, and Mike Nordstrom	September 27, 2014	120	1.7
SwaySway must keep Buhduece from going berserk by hiding his horrible haircut.
12a	12a	"Lil' Loafie"	Gary Doodles	Brady Klosterman	Andrew Dickman, Robert Iza, and Mike Nordstrom	October 4, 2014	129	1.54
A loaf of bread becomes famous after SwaySway and Buhdeuce take it on as their protege. Guest Star: Cree Summer as Background Dancers
12b	12b	"Oonski the Grateful"	Brian Morante	Gene Grillo	Adriel Garcia, Pez Hofman, and Ryan Khatam	October 4, 2014	130	1.54
SwaySway and Buhdeuce save Oonski the Great from a monster, and to repay them he wants to be their servant for the rest of his life. Guest Star: Max Mittelman as Cloud Monster
13a	13a	"TNT-Midi"	Casey Burke Leonard	Gene Grillo	Adriel Garcia, Pez Hofman, and Brian Morante	October 11, 2014	121	1.95
T-Midi is throwing a party that SwaySway and Buhdeuce are not invited to. The Breadwinners must deliver Snails on Kale Bread to T-Midi for his party, but mistakenly deliver Spicy Dynamite Bread instead. Now they must retrieve the bread before anyone eats it and explodes.
13b	13b	"Poltergoose"	Dave Stone	Amy Wolfram and Steve Borst	Jeremy Bernstein, Rob Lilly, and MJ Sandhe	October 11, 2014	122	1.95
While making a delivery to Mrs. Furfle, SwaySway decides to take a short cut through the Pondgea Triangle. Buhdeuce is convinced the place is cursed, but agrees to go after SwaySway tells him about how much bread he will get to eat along the way. While flying through the Pondgea Triangle, they accidentally hit a Poltergoose, which possesses the Rocket Van. The Breadwinners and Ketta try to figure out a way to get rid of the Poltergoose. Guest Star: Max Mittelman as Poltergoose
14	14	"Night of the Living Bread"	Brian Morante and Dave Stone	Scott Kreamer and Steve Borst	Jeremy Bernstein, Adriel Garcia, Pez Hofman, Ryan Khatam, Rob Lilly, and MJ Sandhe	October 18, 2014	133/134	1.68
SwaySway and Buhdeuce create a bread that turns others into zombies that crave bread.
15a	15a	"Pizzawinners"	Ken McIntyre	Bill Motz & Bob Roth	Andrew Dickman, Robert Iza, and Mike Nordstrom	November 1, 2014	132	1.92
SwaySway and Buhdeuce meet Zoona and Roni, two female cranes who deliver pizza in a monster truck on their turf. Guest Stars: Tara Strong as Zoona, Candi Milo as Roni
15b	15b	"Yeasterday"	Dave Stone	Gene Grillo	Jeremy Bernstein, Rob Lilly, and MJ Sandhe	November 1, 2014	131	1.92
To save SwaySway's life, Buhdeuce eats Yeasterday bread and keeps reliving the same day.
16a	16a	"Space Ducks"	Ken McIntyre	Bill Motz & Bob Roth	Robert Iza and Mike Nordstrom	November 15, 2014	126	1.85
SwaySway and Buhdeuce go into space to deliver bread to astronauts.
16b	16b	"Kettastrophe"	Dave Stone	Gene Grillo	Jeremy Bernstein, Rob Lilly, and MJ Sandhe	November 15, 2014	125	1.85
Ketta moves in with the boys, but she invents things that turn their lives upside down.
17a	17a	"Pondgea's Got Talent"	Ken McIntyre	Steve Borst and Gary Doodles	Andrew Dickman, Robert Iza, and Mike Nordstrom	November 22, 2014	135	1.7
17b	17b	"Raging Mole"	Brian Morante	Gene Grillo	Adriel Garcia, Pez Hofman, and Ryan Khatam	November 22, 2014	136	1.7
18a	18a	"Robot Arms"	Dave Stone	Bill Motz & Bob Roth	Jeremy Bernstein, Rob Lilly, and MJ Sandhe	April 12, 2015	137	N/A
Buhdeuce asks Ketta to give him robot arms so that he can have superhuman strength and mine bread without getting tired. However, all of Duck Town now wants him to do them favors with his newfound strength.
18b	18b	"PB & J"	Ken McIntyre	Bill Motz & Bob Roth	Andrew Dickman, Robert Iza, and Mike Nordstrom	April 12, 2015	138	N/A
When Buhdeuce orders a special dish at Pumpers', it turns out to be a live panda named PB, so he and SwaySway take him home as their second pet. Jelly must then uncover PB's true intentions of being taken home with them.
19a	19a	"Big Screen Buhdeuce"	Brian Morante	Bill Motz & Bob Roth	Adriel Garcia, Pez Hofman, and Ryan Khatam	April 19, 2015	139	N/A
Buhdeuce gets scouted by Steven Quackberg (a parody of Steven Spielberg) for his stunts and becomes a movie star.
19b	19b	"Weekend at Furfle's"	Dave Stone	Story by : Gene Grillo, Casey Burke Leonard, and Dave Stone; Teleplay by : Gene Grillo	Jeremy Bernstein, Rob Lilly, and MJ Sandhe	April 19, 2015	140	N/A
Mrs. Furfle is getting ready for a date with T-Midi, but she is sad because she is old and cannot dance anymore. SwaySway introduces her the Power Nap Bread, in which she eats the whole loaf and falls asleep for a long time. Now the Breadwinners must cover her up for her date.
20	20	"Birds of a Feather" (Note: This episode first aired on February 9, 2015 in Germany and Poland.)	Casey Burke Leonard and Dave Stone	Story by : Steve Borst, Gary Doodles, and Bill Motz & Bob Roth; Teleplay by : Steve Borst and Gary Doodles	Jeremy Bernstein, Adriel Garcia, Pez Hofman, Rob Lilly, Brian Morante, and MJ Sandhe	April 26, 2015	127/128	1.09
Swaysway and Buhdeuce tell each other the story of how they became Breadwinners while hiding from a dangerous worm monster. Guest Stars: Tom Kenny as SwaySway's Dad and Bear Ruffinbuff, Cree Summer as SwaySway's Mom, Mindy Sterling as Buhdeuce's Mom

=== Season 2 (2015–16) ===
No. overall	No. in season	Title	Directed by	Written by	Storyboarded by	Original release date	Prod. code	US viewers (millions)
Nickelodeon
21a	1a	"Adventures in Big Baby Bun Sitting"	Brian Morante	Bill Motz & Bob Roth	Adriel Garcia, Pez Hofman, and Ryan Khatam	April 5, 2015	202	1.13
Big Baby Buns' parents entrust him to the Breadwinners for the weekend, but while they're gone their baby immediately grows into a teenager, making it a pain for the Breadwinners to look out for him. Guest Stars: David Forseth as Trippa B and Big Daddy Crumbs, April Winchell as Mama Monster
21b	1b	"Crumbskull"	Ken McIntyre	Gene Grillo	Andrew Dickman, Robert Iza, and Mike Nordstrom	April 5, 2015	201	1.13
Buhdeuce accidentally lets Ketta eat a loaf that makes her insanely stupid.
22a	2a	"Chest Hair Club"	Brian Morante	Steve Borst	Adriel Garcia, Stephen Herczeg, and Ryan Khatam	May 10, 2015	208	0.97
SwaySway officially reaches manhood when he grows his third strand of chest hair.
22b	2b	"Bros' Night Out"	Ken McIntyre	Brady Klosterman	Andrew Dickman, Mike Nordstrom, and Raymond Santos	May 10, 2015	207	0.97
SwaySway and Buhdeuce get T-Midi to have the perfect bros' night out to take time off from obeying his mother.
23a	3a	"Bad to the Duck Bone"	Dave Stone	Gene Grillo	Jeremy Bernstein, Rob Lilly, and MJ Sandhe	May 17, 2015	203	1.15
When SwaySway finds out his crush Jenny Quackles only likes bad boys, he eats a loaf of Dark Rye which makes him gothic. Guest Star: Luther Creek as Dark Rye Skeleton
23b	3b	"Rodeo Ducks"	Ken McIntyre	Bill Motz & Bob Roth	Andrew Dickman, Robert Iza, and Mike Nordstrom	May 17, 2015	204	1.15
SwaySway and Buhdeuce participate in a rodeo but it's more challenging than what they practiced. Guest Star: Stephen Stanton as Judge Pobun
24a	4a	"Viking Ducks"	Dave Stone	Gene Grillo	Jeremy Bernstein, Rob Lilly, and Henrique Jardim	May 24, 2015	209	1.11
The Breadwinners end up being hired by Oonski after Ketta insists they get a real job.
24b	4b	"Birthday Bread"	Ken McIntyre	Bill Motz & Bob Roth	Andrew Dickman, Mike Nordstrom, and Raymond Santos	May 24, 2015	210	1.11
Disappointed that today isn't his birthday, Buhdeuce keeps eating birthday bread which makes any day his birthday. Guest Star: John Kassir as Toilet Monster
25a	5a	"Wolf Head Bread"	Dave Stone	Steve Borst	Henrique Jardim, Rob Lilly, and Stan Ruiz	October 25, 2015	218	1.46
When SwaySway and Buhdeuce find out their ancestors have all discovered that different loaf of bread, they question the Bread Maker of any undiscovered loaf, starting their mission to find a two headed wolf.
25b	5b	"Rock N' Roar"	Brian Morante	Brady Klosterman	Adriel Garcia, Stephen Herczeg, and Ryan Khatam	October 25, 2015	217	1.46
The Breadwinners help their idol, Lionel "Thrashman" Thrash, get his career back on track. Guest Star: Peter Giles as Thrashman
26a	6a	"Movie Ducks"	Brian Morante	Bill Motz & Bob Roth	Adriel Garcia, Stephen Herczeg, and Ryan Khatam	November 1, 2015	211	1.22
SwaySway and Buhdeuce are requested by Steven Quackberg to star in his next film, but the director isn't as he seems.
26b	6b	"Don't Feed the Duckosaurs"	Dave Stone	Gene Grillo	Henrique Jardim, Rob Lilly, and Bryan Newton	November 1, 2015	212	1.22
After Ketta warns the Breadwinners about the duckosaurs and not feeding them, a pterodactyl abducts them to where the duckosaurs live.
27a	7a	"Wrath of the Pizza Lord"	Dave Stone	Bill Motz & Bob Roth	Jeremy Bernstein, Henrique Jardim, Rob Lilly, and MJ Sandhe	November 8, 2015	206	1.11
The Pizzawinners return as the Breadwinners find out that they are being threatened by their master, Pizza Lord, who only eats pizza and threatens to turn the girls into pizza and eat them alive. Guest Stars: Tara Strong as Zoona, Candi Milo as Roni and Maddie Taylor as Pizza Lord
27b	7b	"Shrunken Ducks"	Brian Morante	Gene Grillo	Adriel Garcia, Stephen Herczeg, and Ryan Khatam	November 8, 2015	205	1.11
SwaySway and Buhdeuce eat shrink bread in an attempt to escape their arrest by Rambamboo.
28a	8a	"Trash Bandit"	Ken McIntyre	Gene Grillo	Andrew Dickman, Mike Nordstrom, and Raymond Santos	November 15, 2015	216	0.97
SwaySway and Buhdeuce are confronted by a raccoon who has it in for their trash. Guest Star: Trevor Devall as Trash Bandit
28b	8b	"Eat at Pumpers"	Brian Morante	Bill Motz & Bob Roth	Adriel Garcia, Stephen Herczeg, and Ryan Khatam	November 15, 2015	214	0.97
SwaySway and Buhdeuce help Pumpers with his new commercial when his business is poor, but customers aren't the only ones attracted to the diner. Guest Stars: John Kassir as Big Dumb Monster, Jim Cummings as Indecisive Monster
29	9	"A Crustmas Story"	Brian Morante and Dave Stone	Gene Grillo	Adriel Garcia, Stephen Herczeg, Henrique Jardim, Ryan Khatam, Rob Lilly, and Stan Ruiz	December 11, 2015	229/230	1.26
SwaySway and Buhdeuce stay up all night waiting for Santa Crust to come while reading each other quazy holiday stories and singing Crustmas carols. Guest Star: Peter Giles as Thrashman; Note: This was the last episode to premiere on Nickelodeon, as future episodes would instead start airing on Nicktoons.
Nicktoons
30a	10a	"Flock Collecting"	Dave Stone	Bill Motz & Bob Roth	Henrique Jardim, Rob Lilly, and Stan Ruiz	April 25, 2016	215	0.12
SwaySway and Buhdeuce are abducted by aliens, but the abduction runs differently than originally planned.
30b	10b	"Bye Bye Booty"	Ken McIntyre	Kevin Arrieta and Steve Borst	Andrew Dickman, Mike Nordstorm, and Raymond Santos	April 18, 2016	213	0.19
Buhdeuce's booty feels mistreated, and it separates. Guest Star: Roger Craig Smith as Buhdeuce's Booty
31a	11a	"Bread Foot"	Dave Stone	Bill Motz & Bob Roth	Henrique Jardim, Rob Lilly, and Stan Ruiz	May 2, 2016	221	0.13
SwaySway gets mistaken for the legendary Bread Foot.
31b	11b	"My Fair Frog"	Ken McIntyre	Gene Grillo	Andrew Dickman, Mike Nordstrom, and Raymond Santos	August 1, 2016	222	N/A
When T-Midi insults Jelly, the guys enter her in the exclusive Duck Town Frog Show to prove that she's the best frog in the entire world.
32a	12a	"Roboloafie"	Ken McIntyre	Brady Klosterman	Andrew Dickman, Mike Nordstrom, and Raymond Santos	May 9, 2016	225	N/A
When SwaySway and Buhdeuce accidentally cause Lil Loafie to get smashed, Ketta rebuilds him into a law enforcement machine! Guest Star: Steve Blum as Roboloafie
32b	12b	"Bad Zituation"	Brian Morante	Bill Motz & Bob Roth	Adriel Garcia, Stephen Herczeg, and Ryan Khatam	August 1, 2016	226	N/A
When SwaySway gets a zit that he thinks makes him look hideous, he runs away to Monster Island.
33a	13a	"Sneeze the Day"	Ken McIntyre	Gene Grillo	Andrew Dickman, Mike Nordstrom, and Raymond Santos	May 23, 2016	219	N/A
Buhdeuce gets a cold and then gives it to the Bread Maker, Which causes his magic to go haywire.
33b	13b	"Tooth Fairy Ducks"	Brian Morante	Bill Motz & Bob Roth	Adriel Garcia, Stephen Herczeg, and Ryan Khatam	July 26, 2016 (Online); September 12, 2016	220	N/A
After accidentally taking the Tooth Fairy out of action, Sway Sway and Buhdeuce have to level up into Tooth Fairy Ducks. Guest Star: Eliza Schneider as Tooth Fairy
34a	14a	"Slumber Party of Horror"	Dave Stone	Gene Grillo	Henrique Jardim, Rob Lilly, and Stan Ruiz	May 16, 2016	227	N/A
T-Midi insists that the Breadwinners stay over for a slumber party. When they tell scary stories, they accidentally summon One-Eyed Peekaboo. Guest Star: Robert Englund as One-Eyed Peekaboo
34b	14b	"Quack to the Future"	Ken McIntyre	Steve Borst	Andrew Dickman, Mike Nordstrom, and Raymond Santos	August 8, 2016	228	N/A
SwaySway finally builds up the courage to ask Jenny out on a date with a little help from his Future self.
35a	15a	"Graining Day"	Dave Stone	Steve Borst	Henrique Jardim, Rob Lilly, and Stan Ruiz	June 6, 2016	233	N/A
While SwaySway is training Buhdeuce how to survive monster attacks, they stumble upon a mysterious old Breadwinner in the bread mines
35b	15b	"Breadator"	Ken McIntyre	Mark Palmer	Andrew Dickman, Mike Nordstrom, and Raymond Santos	July 18, 2016	234	N/A
While exploring a strange new cavern in the bread mines, the guys stumble across a creature that hunts Breadwinners for sport.
36a	16a	"Buhdouble Trouble"	Brian Morante	Gene Grillo	Adriel Garcia, Stephen Herczeg, and Ryan Khatam	June 13, 2016	237	N/A
SwaySway likes his bap so much he wishes there were more of him. So Buhdeuce eats Clone Bread, creating not quite exact copies of himself.
36b	16b	"Unlucky Duckies"	Ken McIntyre	Brady Klosterman	Andrew Dickman, Mike Nordstrom, and Raymond Santos	August 15, 2016	238	N/A
SwaySway discovers a loaf of Pot of Gold Bread and gets cursed by a surly Loafrechaun.
37a	17a	"Substitute Breadwinner"	Dave Stone	Gene Grillo	Henrique Jardim, Rob Lilly, and Stan Ruiz	July 4, 2016	224	N/A
When SwaySway suffers a major butt injury, Ketta takes over as a substitute Breadwinner.
37b	17b	"Taloney Baloney"	Brian Morante	Bill Motz & Bob Roth	Adriel Garcia, Stephen Herczeg, and Ryan Khatam	August 8, 2016	223	N/A
When SwaySway and Buhdeuce discover that T-Midi was a child star, it has unforeseen consequences with Oonski.
38a	18a	"Rambamwho?"	Dave Stone	Gene Grillo	Henrique Jardim, Rob Lilly, and Stan Ruiz	June 20, 2016	236	N/A
Rambamboo eats a loaf of Forget Who I Am Bread and forgets who she is, so SwaySway and Buhdeuce convince her that she's a free-spirited party animal.
38b	18b	"Nightmare on Swamp Pad Lane"	Brian Morante	Brady Klosterman	Adriel Garcia, Stephen Herczeg, and Ryan Khatam	August 15, 2016	235	N/A
In order to stop Buhdeuce's reoccurring nightmare, SwaySway eats a loaf of bread that enables him to enter into Buhdeuce's dream world.
39a	19a	"The Princess Frog Bride"	Ken McIntyre	Brady Klosterman	Andrew Dickman, Mike Nordstrom, and Raymond Santos	June 27, 2016	231	N/A
When Jelly gets mistaken for a princess, the guys have to rescue her from the clutches of Oonski The Great.
39b	19b	"Super Duck vs. Muscle Bread"	Brian Morante	Mark Palmer	Adriel Garcia, Stephen Herczeg, and Ryan Khatam	July 11, 2016	232	N/A
SwaySway and Buhdeuce L-l-l-l-level up into Superhero Ducks to figure out which of their favorite comic book heroes is more powerful.
40a	20a	"Great White Shark Bread"	Ken McIntyre	Mark Palmer	Andrew Dickman, Mike Nordstrom, and Raymond Santos	August 22, 2016	239	N/A
SwaySway and Buhdeuce take to the Great Pond when an old sea captain's order of Great White Shark Bread turns into an epic quest.
40b	20b	"Freaky Finger Bread"	Dave Stone	Steve Borst	Henrique Jardim, Rob Lilly, and Stan Ruiz	August 22, 2016	240	N/A
When Buhdeuce gives SwaySway a loaf of Freaky Finger Bread for his birthday, SwaySway has to pretend he likes the horrifying thing.
