= Ryan Khatam =

American animator and storyboard artist (born 1982)

Ryan Khatam (born 1982) is an American animator and storyboard artist. He has worked on Metalocalypse and MTV's Good Vibes. He was also a storyboard artist for two season 1 episodes of Breadwinners. He worked as an animator on the Gecko & Sticky segment of Shredderman Rules and on Baton (バトン, directed by Ryuhei Kitamura). Khatam also worked as an animator on Black Panther and TripTank. In 2013, he worked on the Kickstarter-funded feature film Dick Figures: The Movie. In November 2014, he launched his own Kickstarter for Johnny Rocketfingers 3.

== History ==
Khatam began animating at the age of 14. His first animation was very crude, using a basic stick figure. He studied animation at Rancho Bernardo High School, Palomar College, Los Angeles Academy of Figurative Art, and The Animation Academy. His first freelance job was to animate deaths for Gorilla 2: The Return, the sequel to Gorillas. He was then contacted by Conspiracy Games to create a sequel to his own Johnny Rocketfingers. As of November 2014, this sequel, Johnny Rocketfingers 2, has been viewed more than 4.5 million times.
