= Middlemost Post =

American animated television series

- Genre: Comedy
- Created by: John Trabbic III
- Developed by: Dave H. Johnson; John Trabbic III
- Voices of: Becky Robinson; John DiMaggio; Kiren; Colton Dunn; Johnny Pemberton
- Theme music composer: Tish Mahaffey; Matt Mahaffey
- Opening theme: "Middlemost Post Theme" (written by Leticia Wolf and Matt Mahaffey)
- Composer: Matt Mahaffey
- Country of origin: United States
- Original language: English
- No. of seasons: 2
- No. of episodes: 33 (62 segments)

Production
- Executive producers: Dave H. Johnson (season 2); John Trabbic III (season 2)
- Editor: Ralph A. Eusebio
- Running time: 22 minutes (11 minutes per segment)
- Production company: Nickelodeon Animation Studio

Original release
- Network: Nickelodeon
- Release: July 9, 2021 – October 21, 2022

Middlemost Post is an American animated comedy television series created by John Trabbic III and developed by Dave H. Johnson and Trabbic III for Nickelodeon. It aired from July 9, 2021, to October 21, 2022.

On March 28, 2024, the series was removed from Paramount+ as part of a "strategic decision to focus on content with mass global appeal".

== Premise ==
Parker J. Cloud, a former raincloud, their friend Angus, and pet walrus Russell deliver mail all across Mount Middlemost.

== Characters ==
- Parker J. Cloud (voiced by Becky Robinson)
- Angus Roy Shackelton (voiced by John DiMaggio)
- Lily (voiced by Kiren)
- Mayor Peeve (voiced by Colton Dunn)
- Ryan (voiced by Johnny Pemberton)

=== Guest ===
- Old Skool (voiced by Del the Funky Homosapien)
- Hawk Man (voiced by Tony Hawk)

== Production ==
On June 16, 2020, it was announced that Nickelodeon had ordered the series from SpongeBob SquarePants storyboard director, John Trabbic III. The 20-episode series is produced by Nickelodeon Animation Studio, with work being done remotely during the COVID-19 pandemic. The animation was done by Yowza! Animation in Canada. On March 18, 2021, it was revealed via Nickelodeon's 2021 upfront show that the series would premiere in July 2021. On June 17, 2021, it was announced that the series would premiere on July 9, 2021, and the first trailer for the series was released.

On March 24, 2022, the series was renewed for a second season of 13 episodes, which premiered on August 2, 2022.

== Episodes ==
=== Series overview ===
Season	Segments	Episodes	Originally released	
Season	Segments	Episodes	First released	Last released
1	38	20	July 9, 2021	August 1, 2022
2	24	13	August 2, 2022	October 21, 2022

=== Season 1 (2021–22) ===
Howie Perry serves as the supervising director of each episode.

No. overall	No. in season	Title	Written by	Storyboard by	Original release date	Prod. code	U.S. viewers (millions)
1	1	"First Delivery"	Jim Martin and Dave H. Johnson	Trey Chavez, Ari Castleton (director)	July 9, 2021	101	0.47
1	1	"Chore or Less"	Jim Martin and Dave H. Johnson	Stephen Herczeg, Megan Ann Boyd (director)	July 9, 2021	101	0.47
"First Delivery": During a day of deliveries, Parker, Angus and Russell come to a house in Yellow Springs that is heavily guarded. They try to hand-deliver mail to a person named Levi Alone, who never receives mail from anyone. The gang tries to go through obstacles in his backyard to get to the front door. After multiple attempts from Parker and Angus, they reach the front door. It turns out the letter was from Parker, who made a letter to cheer up their day. "Chore or Less": Angus teaches Parker the importance of chores and how to do them. After a failed attempt at doing chores properly, Parker starts to realize that doing chores is boring. Because they refuse to do chores, the ship fills up with junk and starts to fall off the mountain.
2	2	"BURT! The Musical"	Dave H. Johnson	Stephen Herczeg, Megan Ann Boyd (director)	July 16, 2021	102	0.28
2	2	"Sunday No FunDay"	Dale Malinowski and Dave H. Johnson	Diem Doan, Ari Castleton (director)	July 16, 2021	102	0.28
"BURT! The Musical": Angus accidentally recycles Burt, Parker's cardboard buddy, so they go to the recycling center. They come across the Recycling King who tells them that they can't have Burt back, as it is recyclable and belongs to the world. They plan to sneak out and steal their Burt back from the center. "Sunday No FunDay": During their day off, Angus wants to spend a relaxing Sunday, but Parker and Russell keep bothering him. He sends them out of the Middlemost Post to quit bothering him, but Parker assumes they're kicked out permanently, so they try to find both a new job and a new place to stay.
3	3	"POSTBOT 3000"	Rocco Pucillo	Luc Latulippe, Keith Silva (director)	July 23, 2021	103	0.40
3	3	"Boom Goes the Cloud"	Katie Chilson and Dave H. Johnson	Gabe Del Valle, Megan Ann Boyd (director)	July 23, 2021	103	0.40
"POSTBOT 3000": Mayor Peeve challenges the Middlemost Post to a mail-off against his robotic companions, Postbot and Drone Parker. The robotic team has a higher advantage of delivering the mail and making it to the end, but is met with challenges; Parker accidentally destroys the drone while inside Russell and hides it from everybody, and Postbot gets distracted. Ryan is sent by Peeve to fix the robot, and he gets kicked into Old Stinkhole by the machine. Postbot makes it to the finish line, but Angus returns with Ryan rescued. The town decides to stick with the current team instead of the Postbot. "Boom Goes the Cloud": Parker startles the entire mountain with loud, constant thunder, which seems to be caused while they're dreaming. Angus does what he can to make sure Parker is okay, but he finds out that what's causing their Booms is Ms. Pam's special toast, the "Frooty Tooty Toasty Cutie".
4	4	"I Named It Whiskers"	Janis Robertson	Stephen Herczeg, Megan Ann Boyd (director)	July 30, 2021	104	0.31
4	4	"How Angus Got His Groove Back"	Mo Moffett	Diem Doan, Ari Castleton (director)	July 30, 2021	104	0.31
"I Named It Whiskers": Lily creates an automated vacuum to clean up confetti and constantly upgrades it until it goes haywire. She and Parker try to stop it from destroying her store. "How Angus Got His Groove Back": Angus becomes immature after he loses his beanie that was passed on to him by his father. Parker and Russell go around and try to find the needed materials to make a similar beanie to Angus's, while he stays at Ms. Pam's restaurant and gets babysat. Just as Angus is about to wear the new beanie, it turns out that this is a daydream from him, and Parker finds his beanie in the toilet.
5	5	"The Tooth Hurts"	A.J. Marchisello and Dave H. Johnson	Amy Mai, Keith Silva (director)	August 6, 2021	105	0.39
5	5	"The Middlemost Toast"	A.J. Marchisello and Dave H. Johnson	Amy Mai, Keith Silva (director)	August 6, 2021	105	0.39
"The Tooth Hurts": Russell loses a tooth, and Parker tries desperately to find a replacement for it with the help of his other friends, making Angus think he doesn't want to hang out with him. "The Middlemost Toast": Today is Free Toast Day, and Parker does whatever they can to make sure Angus gets free toast at his favorite restaurant, the Middlemost Toast. By derailing the crowd in other places, Angus makes it to the end of the line and is served the last toast offered. The crowd goes in a rage, so Parker decides to split the toast into crumbs and uses rain and lightning to duplicate the piece to everyone in the town.
6	6	"My Buddy, Buddy"	A.J. Marchisello and Dave H. Johnson	Luc Latulippe, Keith Silva (director)	August 13, 2021 (Note: This episode was leaked on Amazon and iTunes in the U.S. on August 8, 2021.)	106	0.27
6	6	"Love Letters"	Katie Chilson	Gabe Del Valle, Megan Ann Boyd (director)	August 13, 2021	106	0.27
"My Buddy, Buddy": Two leprechauns disguised as a new townie named "Buddy" attempt to steal gold from Parker, thinking that their rainbows can help lead them to find gold. They try to find whatever makes Parker very happy and "Rainblow", and it turns out that they can while riding rollercoasters. Angus, Russell and Lily find out the truth about the Leprechauns and go seeking for Parker. "Love Letters": Parker finds hidden love letters written by Angus after scavenging around Russell's belly. They go around the mountain to find who the letters are written for. They read the letters out loud on public radio, desperate to find out who the admirer is until Angus stops them. After everyone on the mountain goes crazy for Angus and his letters, he reveals to everyone on the mountain that they were actually written for the ocean.
7	7	"Scary Stories to Tell Your Cloud"	A.J. Marchisello and Dave H. Johnson	Gabe Del Valle, Megan Ann Boyd (director)	October 22, 2021	114	0.38
7	7	"The Pumpkin Pageant"	Kelly Fullerton and Gene Grillo	Diem Doan, Ari Castleton (director)	October 22, 2021	114	0.38
"Scary Stories to Tell Your Cloud": During Halloween night, Parker, Angus and Lily tell scary stories while the electricity is out. "The Pumpkin Pageant": Parker and Angus compete with Mayor Peeve in a three-round Pumpkin Pageant.
8	8	"Darker Parker"	Kelly Fullerton	Trey Chavez, Ari Castleton (director)	October 29, 2021	107A	0.46
During a heatwave, Parker makes snow cones out of themself to cool off. Everybody on Mount Middlemost keeps asking them if they could have their snow cones, and they keep saying yes. As a result, they lose most of their color and don't quite act like themself. Angus teaches them that it's cool to say no sometimes, and by saying no, they cool off the entire town.
9	9	"Lady of the Tree"	Steve Borst	Diem Doan, Ari Castleton (director)	November 5, 2021	107B	0.36
Parker and the gang make a delivery to the Lady of the Tree, a mysterious lady that lives in the Middlemost Forest. The lady offers the crew to stay inside to keep her company, and Angus suspects that the old lady is a witch. She reveals herself after she tricks them into cooking Angus to eat him, but she changes her mind after relating to Angus and Parker's friendship.
10	10	"Parker Saves Christmas"	Rocco Pucillo and Dave H. Johnson	Gabe Del Valle and Trey Chavez, Megan Ann Boyd and Ari Castleton (directors)	December 3, 2021	118	0.28
Angus takes the responsibility of delivering presents to everyone on Christmas after he accidentally breaks Santa's leg. Mayor Peeve's birthday is on Christmas, and his birthday wish is to ruin Santa's deliveries.
11	11	"I Know What You Did Last Mail-Off"	Rocco Pucillo and Dave H. Johnson	Trey Chavez and Luc Latulippe, Ari Castleton and Keith Silva (directors)	January 21, 2022	115	0.24
Parker Drone comes back to Mount Middlemost, seeking revenge against Parker for accidentally destroying it. They, Lily and Mayor Peeve team up to find Postbot, who is now a reformed dancing machine.
12	12	"The Sleepover"	Janis Robertson	Keith Silva, Amy Mai (director)	January 28, 2022	108	0.34
12	12	"The "B" Word"	Steve Borst	Gabe Del Valle, Megan Ann Boyd (director)	January 28, 2022	108	0.34
"The Sleepover": Parker has a sleepover with Lily and gets advice from Angus to make the most out of it. "The "B" Word": After getting multiple complaints, Parker and Angus try their hardest to give Russell a bath to get rid of her stench, but she keeps refusing.
13	13	"Dog's Best Friend"	Katie Chilson	Trey Chavez, Ari Castleton (director)	February 4, 2022	109	0.23
13	13	"Out of Shape"	Rocco Pucillo and Dave H. Johnson	Luc Latulippe, Keith Silva (director)	February 4, 2022	109	0.23
"Dog's Best Friend": Angus, who is best friends with dogs around the mountain, tries to woo Ms. Pam's dog Jelly. "Out of Shape": Parker gets a day off work and slouches, messing up their form and ability to work.
14	14	"Premium Parker"	A.J. Marchisello	Stephen Herczeg, Megan Ann Boyd (director)	February 11, 2022	110	0.28
14	14	"Toast of the Town"	Katie Chilson and Dave H. Johnson	Amy Mai, Keith Silva (director)	February 11, 2022	110	0.28
"Premium Parker": The gang spends a family vacation at a hotel to celebrate their anniversary. Parker makes some new friends and becomes the life of the party. "Toast of the Town": Ms. Pam hosts a toast-making competition, with the winner having their toast creation appear on the restaurant menu.
15	15	"Ariel Force One"	Mo Moffett	Amy Mai, Keith Silva (director)	February 18, 2022	111	0.25
15	15	"Itsy Bitsy"	Han-Yee Ling	Gabe Del Valle, Megan Ann Boyd (director)	February 18, 2022	111	0.25
"Ariel Force One": The gang meets a pilot after her hot air balloon crashes into the Middlemost Post. They help her refuel it by finding a special gas sourced from a forbidden forest on the mountain. "Itsy Bitsy": Parker learns that Angus has a fear of spiders after they let one in the house during a blizzard.
16	16	"They're All Named Reggie"	Steve Borst	Luc Latulippe, Keith Silva (director)	February 25, 2022	112	0.37
16	16	"The Same Ol' Same"	Lee House	Trey Chavez, Ari Castleton (director)	February 25, 2022	112	0.37
"They're All Named Reggie": Parker and the gang try to find the parent of a lost baby in the confusing town of Purpleton, where everyone is a Reggie. "The Same Ol' Same": Famous rapper Old Skool comes to Mount Middlemost to perform, but he gets tired of performing the same concert. Parker shows him around the mountain and inspires him to perform a brand-new song.
17	17	"Cloud of the Month"	Katie Chilson	Stephen Herczeg, Megan Ann Boyd (director)	March 4, 2022	113	0.25
17	17	"A. Plumber"	Kelly Fullerton	Diem Doan, Ari Castleton (director)	March 4, 2022	113	0.25
"Cloud of the Month": Parker wants to become employee of the month, so Angus makes up Cloud of the Month and awards it to them, which gets to their head. "A. Plumber": Mayor Peeve cuts off the water supply to the Middlemost Post and orders Ryan to disguise himself as a plumber to sabotage the ship.
18	18	"Dolores Moody"	Kelly Fullerton and Dave H. Johnson	Stephen Herczeg, Megan Ann Boyd (director)	April 29, 2022	116	0.24
18	18	"P.I.R.A.T.E."	Susan Hurwitz Arneson and Marc Arneson	Diem Doan, Ari Castleton (director)	April 29, 2022	116	0.24
"Dolores Moody": After delivering mail to the unhappy Dolores Moody, Parker tries to cheer her up by doing nice things for her. "P.I.R.A.T.E.": The gang meets a pirate after he tries to steal their ship. He and Angus play a game filled with challenges to see who wins.
19	19	"Inside Russell"	Katie Chilson and Dave H. Johnson	Sara Jerzykowski, Keith Silva (director)	May 6, 2022	117	0.22
19	19	"The Stinkhole Chronicles"	A.J. Marchisello and Marc Arneson	Luc Latulippe, Keith Silva (director)	May 6, 2022	117	0.22
"Inside Russell": Parker and a rapidly aging Angus are trapped inside the belly of Russell during her nap and try to get out in time. "The Stinkhole Chronicles": Parker accidentally drops Angus in Old Stinkhole, so they and Lily go on a long quest inside the hole to find him.
20	20	"Hair Today, Gone Tomorrow"	Kelly Fullerton	Stephen Herczeg, Megan Ann Boyd (director)	May 13, 2022	119	0.23
20	20	"Dentist Trip"	Mo Moffett	Diem Doan, Ari Castleton (director)	May 13, 2022	119	0.23
"Hair Today, Gone Tomorrow": Parker assumes they're becoming an adult after they find hair on their body. "Dentist Trip": During a trip to Russell's dentist, Parker starts to remember their origins and what they did to Angus and his ship.
21	21	"Ranch on the Side"	Dave Tennant	Gabe Del Valle, Megan Ann Boyd (director)	August 1, 2022	120	0.29
21	21	"King Cloud vs. Smogzilla"	Mo Moffett	Fernando Puig, Keith Silva (director)	August 1, 2022	120	0.29
"Ranch on the Side": After Parker runs out of ketchup for their toast, Angus suggests that they try ranch as a substitute instead. They end up in love with it and decide to try it on all kinds of foods. This goes haywire, as Parker decides to marry ranch, and they and the bottle spend an entire day in the Yellow Springs resort. Their love for it fades away as the bottle of ranch gets smellier and rotten, and Terry, who also had a bad relationship with hot sauce, suggests that Parker distances themself from it. After the bottle explodes, Parker returns home and goes back to having ketchup on their meals instead of ranch. "King Cloud vs. Smogzilla": Mayor Peeve decides to create a gigantic fireplace to keep him and Ryan warm inside the City Hall, but they find out that they've been misusing it and the fireplace creates a gigantic toxic smog cloud. Parker tries to get the cloud to leave, but he ends up ignoring him and it starts terrorizing the mountain. Parker fights back and disintegrates the smog by turning it back into its original form and shrinking it, saving the town.

=== Season 2 (2022) ===
No. overall	No. in season	Title	Written by	Storyboard by	Original release date	Prod. code	U.S. viewers (millions)
22	1	"Parker Gets Rich"	Steve Borst	Luc Latulippe, Keith Silva (director)	August 2, 2022	201	0.28
22	1	"Ultimate Fighting Cloud"	Katie Chilson and Dave H. Johnson	Trey Chavez, Ari Castleton (director)	August 2, 2022	201	0.28
"Parker Gets Rich": Parker becomes overprotective of their newfound riches when Angus tells them that people are only trying to leech off their wealth. "Ultimate Fighting Cloud": The Middlemost Post gang discovers a secret backyard wrestling league that challenges both their skills and egos.
23	2	"Parker Gets the Bird"	Story by : Kelly Fullerton; Written by : Megan Ann Boyd, Ari Castleton, Howie Perry and Keith Silva	Megan Ann Boyd, Ari Castleton, Keith Silva and Howie Perry (also director)	August 3, 2022	202	0.30
23	2	"Anchor Shackleton"	Corinne Marshall	Stephen Herczeg, Ari Castleton (director)	August 3, 2022	202	0.30
"Parker Gets the Bird": In a silent, gag-based cartoon akin to Looney Tunes and Tom and Jerry, Parker attempts to protect the last surviving strawberry plant they have from an antagonistic and relentless crow. "Anchor Shackleton": Parker tries to teach Angus how to swim so he can enter the newly opened pool.
24	3	"Side Hustle"	John Reynolds	Diem Doan, Megan Ann Boyd (director)	August 4, 2022	203	0.19
24	3	"Burt Speaks"	Janis Robertson	Fernando Puig, Keith Silva (director)	August 4, 2022	203	0.19
"Side Hustle": Parker takes up various side jobs so they can buy Angus a new gadget he desperately wants. "Burt Speaks": Parker's inanimate friend made out of recyclables, Burt becomes a popular visionary when his bubble pops are decoded to say yes or no. Unfortunately, the Middlemost Post doesn't realize that Burt is slowly deflating.
25	4	"Unhappy Campers"	Alex Rinehart and Dave H. Johnson	Trey Chavez, Ari Castleton (director)	August 8, 2022	204	0.21
25	4	"Leprechauns 2"	John Reynolds	Luc Latulippe, Keith Silva (director)	August 8, 2022	204	0.21
"Unhappy Campers": The MMP crew angrily reminisces about past, failed camping ventures while on their most recent camping trip. "Leprechauns 2": Buddy the leprechaun is back in town along with his son, and they try to clear their previously tarnished names - but it seems like he's back to his old tricks of getting Parker's gold in no time. Buddy's son, however, forms a friendship with Parker, and goes against his father's wishes, defending his new friend.
26	5	"Sporty Parker"	Dave Tennant	Gabe Del Valle, Megan Ann Boyd (director)	August 9, 2022	205	0.28
26	5	"Hammy Time"	Katie Chilson and Dave H. Johnson	Stephen Herczeg, Ari Castleton (director)	August 9, 2022	205	0.28
"Sporty Parker": Parker joins the Yellow Springs soccer team, but Angus gets concerned when the nimbus is only participating in minimal and non-committal roles. "Hammy Time": The Middlemost Post falls apart when the trio gets obsessed with their new pet hamster, all giving him conflicting names and personalities.
27	6	"Mayor Ariel"	Mo Moffett	Fernando Puig and Trey Chavez, Keith Silva and Ari Castleton (directors)	August 10, 2022	206	0.21
Ariel comes back to Mount Middlemost and runs for mayor, ultimately winning out to Mayor Steve Peeve, who falls into a deep depression - even Angus gets concerned. Eventually, Ariel realizes that being mayor is not as exciting as she thought.
28	7	"Hawk Man"	Kelsy Abbott and Dave H. Johnson	Diem Doan, Megan Ann Boyd (director)	August 11, 2022	207	0.22
28	7	"Jammy Good!"	Mo Moffett	Gabe Del Valle, Megan Ann Boyd (director)	August 11, 2022	207	0.22
"Hawk Man": Parker and Russell try to revive the career of a furry, washed-up stuntman, Hawk Man. "Jammy Good!": Angus and Mayor Peeve become suspicious of Ms. Pam's new, talking jar of jam, Jammy. Guest star: Tony Hawk as Hawk Man
29	8	"The Box Smusher"	Allison Sanchez	Stephen Herczeg, Ari Castleton (director)	August 15, 2022	208	0.24
29	8	"Tie Dye Eye"	Corinne Marshall	Luc Latulippe, Keith Silva (director)	August 15, 2022	208	0.24
"The Box Smusher": The crew investigates the mystery of multiple packages getting destroyed out of the blue post-delivery. "Tie Dye Eye": A day after Parker recovers from a case of tye-dye eye, which causes others to see things psychedelically and desire hugs, the condition spreads across the mountain and the trio must attempt to survive in a post-apocalyptic-esque turn of events.
30	9	"The Gift of the Mech Suit"	Dave Tennant	Diem Doan, Megan Ann Boyd (director)	August 16, 2022	209	0.20
30	9	"Worst Curse Scenario"	Lindsay Gilman	Fernando Puig, Keith Silva (director)	August 16, 2022	209	0.20
"The Gift of the Mech Suit": Parker makes a terrible cardboard mech suit for Lily's birthday, and she struggles to tell the cloud that she doesn't like it at all. "Worst Curse Scenario": The Middlemost Post receives a mysterious trinket in the mail, which they come to believe brings bad luck.
31	10	"Summer Santa"	Rocco Pucillo	Trey Chavez, Ari Castleton (director)	August 17, 2022	210A	0.22
Angus' brother Santa returns to town.
32	11	"Closed for Cocooning"	Rocco Pucillo	Gabe Del Valle, Megan Ann Boyd (director)	August 18, 2022	210B	0.19
Parker fears that once Lily is complete with her cocooning process and becomes a butterfly, she won't want to hang out with them anymore.
33	12	"To Narwhal, With Love"	Mo Moffett	Luc Latulippe, Keith Silva (director)	August 22, 2022	211A	0.23
Russell falls in love with one of the Blurgon's narwhals, and they get into a romantic relationship.
34	13	"Fear and Loathing in Yellow Springs"	Saundra Hall	Stephen Herczeg, Ari Castleton (director)	August 23, 2022	211B	0.24
Parker and Lily find themselves butting heads when they're stranded in the desert together.
35	14	"Pam & Jelly"	Allison Sanchez	Trey Chavez, Ari Castleton (director)	August 24, 2022	213A	0.30
Parker and Lily try to fix up the broken friendship of Ms. Pam, and her pug, Jelly.
36	15	"Inside Angus"	Mo Moffett and Dave H. Johnson	Diem Doan, Stephen Herczeg, Sara Jerzykowski, Luc Latulippe and Fernando Puig, Megan Ann Boyd (director)	August 25, 2022	213B	0.21
Parker ventures into the surprisingly bubbly world of Angus' insides to retrieve a family stamp that the burly mailman accidentally swallowed.
37	16	"More Scary Stories to Tell Your Cloud"	Mo Moffett & Rocco Pucillo	Diem Doan and Fernando Puig, Megan Ann Boyd and Keith Silva (directors)	October 21, 2022	212	0.11
In a special sequel episode to season 1's "Scary Stories to Tell Your Cloud", the Middlemost Post crew, along with various other mountain inhabitants, tell scary stories to each other on Halloween night, often parodying different films and their tropes, and sometimes experimenting with completely different art-styles. A common factor between all the stories is that Angus is always portrayed as the villain, which he acknowledges multiple times, but all allegations are dismissed.

=== Shorts (2021) ===
Tom Jolliffe serves as the animation director of each episode.

No.	Title	Written by	Original release date	Prod. code
1	"Challenges"	Written by : Jim Martin and Dave H. Johnson; Storyboarded by : Howie Perry (also director)	June 11, 2021	103
1	"Unboxing"	Written by : Jim Martin and Dave H. Johnson; Storyboarded by : Luc Latulippe, Howie Perry (director)	June 11, 2021	103
"Challenges": Parker and Angus go against each other in a competition with multiple different challenges. "Unboxing": Parker gets a package addressed to them, and they decide not to open it to cherish the moment.
2	"DIY"	Written by : A.J. Marchisello and Dave H. Johnson; Storyboarded by : Benji Williams, Howie Perry (director)	June 18, 2021	104
2	"Travel Brochure"	Written by : Katie Chilson and Dave H. Johnson; Storyboarded by : Stephen Herczeg, Howie Perry (director)	June 18, 2021	104
"DIY": Parker and the gang create a brand new cardboard friend named Burt. "Travel Brochure": Lily makes a travel video detailing the top five things to do on Mount Middlemost.
3	"Welcome"	Written by : Dave H. Johnson; Storyboarded by : Luc Latulippe, Howie Perry (director)	June 25, 2021	105
3	"Skip Ads"	Written by : Dave H. Johnson; Storyboarded by : Ari Castleton, Howie Perry (director)	June 25, 2021	105
"Welcome": A new resident moves into the mountain, and Parker gives him a tour. "Skip Ads": Multiple commercials focused on Lily and the Middlemost Post crew.
