= Breadwinners (TV series) =

Nickelodeon animated original series

- Genre: Comedy; Surreal humour Musical; Slapstick
- Created by: Steve Borst; Gary "Doodles" DiRaffaele
- Developed by: Bill Braudis
- Voices of: Robbie Daymond; Eric Bauza; Alexander Polinsky; Fred Tatasciore; Kari Wahlgren; S. Scott Bullock; Audrey Wasilewski; Nolan North; Michael-Leon Wooley
- Composer: Tommy Sica
- Country of origin: United States
- Original language: English
- No. of seasons: 2
- No. of episodes: 40 (77 segments) (list of episodes)

Production
- Executive producers: Gary DiRaffaele; Steve Borst; Mary Harrington
- Producer: Lizbeth Velasco
- Running time: 22 minutes
- Production company: Nickelodeon Animation Studio

Original release
- Network: Nickelodeon
- Release: February 17, 2014 – December 11, 2015
- Network: Nicktoons
- Release: April 18 – September 12, 2016

Breadwinners is an American animated comedy television series created by Gary "Doodles" DiRaffaele and Steve Borst and developed by Bill Braudis for Nickelodeon. The series is about two ducks named SwaySway and Buhdeuce who run a bread delivery company around Pondgea, the show's world.

The series was originally conceived as an animated short from DiRaffaele's efficiency apartment in Studio City, Los Angeles, along with Borst. The two had previously met in Burbank while working on Kevin Shinick’s animated sketch comedy series, Mad, in 2013. Originally a one-off short, Breadwinners premiered at a short film festival held at a bar in New York City, and later was linked to the network, where they were contacted and the show was developed into a full-fledged series, which premiered on February 17, 2014 and ran for two seasons and 40 episodes (comprising 77 segments), ending on September 12, 2016 across Nickelodeon and its sister network, Nicktoons. After the series was cancelled in 2016, the show continued to air reruns on the latter until July 4, 2021. The series was also available on Paramount+ until its removal on December 20, 2024.

== Plot ==
Two anthropomorphic, flightless ducks named SwaySway (voiced by Robbie Daymond) and Buhdeuce (voiced by Eric Bauza), who are best friends, fly around the fictional water-based planet Pondgea in a rocket-powered van delivering bread to the citizens.

SwaySway, tall, thin, and darker green, is the leader of the duo, and although he does not always use the best judgment, he is quite skilled at flying the van. Buhdeuce, short, round, and lime green, is klutzier, but is also an enthusiastic and a loyal assistant to SwaySway. Often, when they get in over their heads, they will "level up", or transform (in a similar vein to video game characters) into a variety of forms they need to solve their problems.

== Characters ==
Buhdeuce (left) and SwaySway (right) in the rocket van.

=== Main ===
- SwaySway (voiced by Robbie Daymond) is a tall green duck who comes from a line of bread delivery ducks. SwaySway pilots the rocket van with his best friend (or "best bap"), Buhdeuce. He is in love with a nonspeaking duck named Jenny Quackles. His signature move is "party punch", where his fist enlarges prior to launching off his arm and deflates once it hits its target.
- Buhdeuce (voiced by Eric Bauza) is a short, round, anthropomorphic green duck who is SwaySway's best friend. Due to his short height, Buhdeuce cannot reach the rocket van controls, so he works as a navigator while SwaySway drives. Buhdeuce is depicted as scatterbrained and inattentive. His signature moves are his "booty kick", where he kicks with his rear end, and "six-pack punch", where a fist comes out of his chest and punches.

=== Supporting ===
- Jelly (voiced by Alexander Polinsky) is the Breadwinners' female pet green frog who acts like a dog.
- The Bread Maker (voiced by Fred Tatasciore) is a human who lives in the bread mines and can be summoned via rubbing a magical toaster. He is T-Midi's idol and claims to be made entirely of bread. SwaySway and Buhdeuce visit him whenever they need advice or assistance.
- Ketta (voiced by Kari Wahlgren) is an energetic swan and master mechanic who runs her own "auto tune-up" business. The Breadwinners consult Ketta for upgrades or repairs to their van.
- T-Midi (voiced by S. Scott Bullock) is a British-accented red owl who is the Breadwinners' best customer.
- Officer Rambamboo (voiced by Audrey Wasilewski) is a toad and the chief of the Tadpolice. She teaches driving classes, and is depicted as strict and impatient. She finds SwaySway and Buhdeuce to be annoying most of the time, as they rarely follow the rules of the road.
- Oonski the Great (voiced by Nolan North) is a beaver and Viking who is an enemy to the public, willing to do anything to steal anything. He speaks in the third person.
- Mr. Pumpers (voiced by Michael-Leon Wooley) is a manly anthropomorphic stork who loves money more than anything. He is the owner of Pumpers' Diner.
- Zoona and Roni (voiced by Tara Strong and Candi Milo) are a pair of cranes who deliver pizzas and act as the Breadwinners' rivals.

== Episodes ==
| Season | Segments | Episodes | | Originally released | | |
| Season | Segments | Episodes | | First released | Last released | Network |
|---|---|---|---|---|---|---|
| Pilot | | | | August 22, 2012 | | YouTube |
| 1 | 38 | 20 | | February 17, 2014 | April 26, 2015 | Nickelodeon |
| 2 | 17 | 20 (Note: 39 segments total) | 9 | April 5, 2015 | December 11, 2015 | Nickelodeon |
| 2 | 22 | 20 | 11 | April 18, 2016 | September 12, 2016 | Nicktoons |

== Production ==
Breadwinners was created by Gary "Doodles" DiRaffaele and Steve Borst. It was conceived as a four-and-a-half-minute animated short from DiRaffaele's efficiency apartment in Studio City, Los Angeles (dubbed the "Doodle Chamber"). The two had previously met in Burbank while working on an animated series, Mad, in 2012. The protagonists, originally unnamed, were drawn by DiRaffaele as part of a collaboration with Borst. Both were drawn tossing a piece of bread up in the air; DiRaffaele explained that the premise came as an extension of his appetite for bread, a staple of meals from his Italian-American upbringing, with friends sometimes calling him a "duck". The latter responded positively to the drawing, saying that he could produce something from it.

The short was written by Borst and animated by DiRaffaele in Adobe Flash Professional over the course of two months. Daymond, who provides the voice of SwaySway, was found on a casting call website and invited into the apartment of DiRaffaele to audition. Originally a one-off, Breadwinners premiered at the Midsummer Night Toons short film festival in New York City, (Note: It was established that DiRaffaele and Borst applied for the Midsummer Night Toons festival in New York City.) where they wanted to entertain their colleagues. The short was uploaded to YouTube with positive reception, and after obtaining 10,000 to 15,000 views on its first week, Borst explained, "it just took on a life of its own." The creators sent it to Nickelodeon after users expressed wanting more. Upon receiving an inquiry from a Nickelodeon executive, DiRaffaele was doubtful of the offer, joking that he "thought it was spam". After several months, the creators were hired to expand the short into a full-fledged series.

Actions in the series play out metronomically—that is, episodes are built around an underlying soundtrack, scored by Tommy Sica (who used to play in a band with DiRaffaele) and recorded before the animation phase. This process entails events in the show unfolding at a faster rate than most animated series like it. Test audiences composed of children were shown to "bounce" accordingly to the beat. Animation is outsourced to Canada through a Titmouse, Inc. studio in Vancouver; like the short, it is also produced in Adobe Animate. (Note: Cold Hard Flash is an entertainment and news website dedicated to media produced with Adobe Flash, founded by Aaron Simpson.) A cartoony look was explicitly chosen as the art style, DiRaffaele noted, which gave way to elements such as dark, heavy outlines around the characters. In addition, retro-style video games were the inspiration for the art direction, with a pixel texture applied to backgrounds and the character's shadows.

== Broadcast ==
The series premiered on February 17, 2014, as a "sneak beak" on Nickelodeon, followed by a regular broadcast on February 22, 2014. It had been ordered for a 20-episode first season a year prior. Its original broadcast garnered roughly 2.8 million viewers, ranking 81st of the top 100 cable shows for adults aged 18 to 49. The network announced a month later in a press release that the show had risen as the top-rated show for kids aged two to eleven, averaging 1.7 million viewers and a Nielsen rating of 5.3. A second season, also consisting of 20 episodes, was announced in May 2014. Episodes that premiered after 2015 were broadcast on Nicktoons.

In Canada, the series premiered on YTV on March 8, 2014. In the United Kingdom and Ireland, Nicktoons started airing it on September 22, 2014. In Australia, Nickelodeon premiered the series on November 1, 2014.

== Reception ==
Upon its series premiere, Breadwinners received negative reviews from critics and audiences alike; common criticisms included the show's extensive usage of toilet humor, tone, visual style, and episode plots. Emily Ashby of Common Sense Media assessed its reliance on toilet humor as questionable while giving credit to the strength of the protagonists' friendship. She enjoyed the bread-related puns sometimes uttered by characters but acknowledged that "they're not likely to strike the same chord of hilarity with your kids." New York Daily News writer David Hinckley linked its style of humor as enticing to its target demographic. He ultimately stated that it "sprinkles in a few grownup jokes, particularly bread-related puns, but it aims mostly at the younger set."

Writing for the Los Angeles Times, Robert Lloyd found its visual style oddly pleasant and identified a slew of potential influences and references. While he saw the humor as "loud and often gross," the result was "basically genial." Tori Michel of About.com dubbed its use of mixed media interesting, yet headache-inducing for parents. While she called the concept and the characters "definitely original," she stressed that its crude humor may call for avoiding it altogether for some parents. Tom Conroy of Media Life Magazine wrote poorly of the show, finding it unfunny throughout. He specified its "noisy and violent" content as too much for little kids as well as being "too stupid for big kids."

== Home media ==
=== DVD releases ===
Region 1
| DVD title | Series(s) | Aspect ratio | Episode count | Total running time | Release date(s) |
|---|---|---|---|---|---|
| Season 1 | 1 | 16:9 | 20 | 450 minutes | August 6, 2015 |
