= Steve Borst =

American television writer and producer

- Occupations: Television writer; producer
- Years active: 2001–present

Steve Borst is an American television writer and producer. For his work on Mad, he was nominated for the Primetime Emmy Award for Outstanding Short Form Animated Program in 2012. He co-created Nickelodeon's Breadwinners with Gary "Doodles" DiRaffaele. His inspiration for the field of animation was CatDog from the network that produced Hey Dude and Double Dare that he grew up watching, Nickelodeon.

== Career ==
Steve Borst lived in New York in 2003 when he became a writer and later head writer for Nick Creative Advertising, working on commercials, corporate presentations, live events, network branding, online commercials, on-air promos, print advertisements, promotional material, and public service announcements. Ever since he moved to Los Angeles in 2009, he has written episodes for Mad and Teen Titans Go! for Cartoon Network. He was head writer for Captain Cornelius Cartoon's Cartoon Lagoon in 2012. He co-created Breadwinners alongside Gary "Doodles" DiRaffaele from when they met at Burbank while working on Mad.

== Filmography ==
=== Film ===
Year	Title	Notes
2001	8 O 15.9994(3)	Writer
2004	Holy Crap, I Can Talk To Plants	Writer
2004	Gone	Writer
2010	Kids Choice Awards Orange Carpet 2010	Writer
2011	FEARnet's Movie With More Brains	Writer
2012	Captain Cornelius Cartoon's Cartoon Lagoon	Head Writer

=== Television ===
Year	Title	Notes
2010–2013	Mad	Writer
2013	The Looney Tunes Show	Writer: Story
2013–2014; 2017–2024	Teen Titans Go!	Writer
2014–2016	Breadwinners	Co-creator, story editor, writer, songwriter, executive producer, and voice director
2021–2022	Middlemost Post	Writer
2024	The Fairly OddParents: A New Wish	Writer ("Stanky Danky")
