= 2003 in animation =

2003 in animation is an overview of notable events, including notable awards, list of films released, television show debuts and endings, and notable deaths.

== Events ==
=== January ===
- January 1: Happy Tree Friends Volume 1 - First Blood renews its theatrical release, by adding its pilot (Banjo Frenzy) and the Special Popcorn episode (of Spin Fun Knowin' Ya) for the first time.
- January 7: The first episode of Little Robots is broadcast.
- January 9: The first episode of Bounty Hamster is broadcast.
- January 20: The Fairly OddParents concludes its second season on Nickelodeon with the half-hour special "Information Stupor Highway". The season's finale was seen by over 4.2 million viewers that night.
- January 21: Walt Disney Studios Home Entertainment initially releases 101 Dalmatians II: Patch's London Adventure, directed by Jim Kammerud and Brian Smith.

=== February ===
- February 2: The Simpsons' 300th episode "The Strong Arms of the Ma" premieres on Fox, featuring the return of Pamela Reed as Ruth Powers, the former neighbor of The Simpsons. The episode was seen by over 15.3 million viewers that night.
- February 8: The first episode of the reboot of Teenage Mutant Ninja Turtles is broadcast.
- February 9: The first episode of Monkey Dust is broadcast.
- February 14: The Jungle Book 2, the sequel to the 1967 film, premieres.
- February 16: The first episode of The Venture Bros. is broadcast.
- February 20: Anime producer Yoshinobu Nishizaki is sentenced to two years and eight months in prison for the illegal possession of firearms, a case which happened in 1999. He is released on 9 December 2007.
- February 21: The first episode of Watch My Chops is broadcast.
- February 24: The first episode of The Save-Ums! is broadcast.

=== March ===
- March 4: Scooby-Doo! and the Legend of the Vampire, the fifth direct-to-video movie of Scooby-Doo, is released.
- March 5: The first episode of Odd Job Jack is broadcast.
- March 9: The Simpsons episode "Mr. Spritz Goes to Washington" premieres, in which Krusty the Clown becomes a Republican. It became controversial for satirizing Fox News's news ticker.
- March 11: The first two episodes of the reboot of Strawberry Shortcake are released on DVD and VHS.
- March 18: Charlotte's Web 2: Wilbur's Great Adventure is released.
- March 19: Season 7 of South Park begins on Comedy Central with the premiere of the episode "Cancelled". It was seen by over 2.3 million viewers that night.
- March 21:
  - The Walt Disney Company releases Piglet's Big Movie, directed by Francis Glebas.
  - The SpongeBob SquarePants half-hour lost episode special "The Sponge Who Could Fly" premieres on Nickelodeon. Its premiere was a cable-ratings success, reeling in a total of over 7.6 million viewers that night (and with it only being watched by 4.3 million viewers in household homes).
- March 23: 75th Academy Awards:
  - Spirited Away, directed by Hayao Miyazaki and produced by Studio Ghibli, wins the Academy Award for Best Animated Feature. Miyazaki boycotts the event because of the U.S. involvement in the Iraq War and stays at home.
  - The ChubbChubbs!, directed by Eric Armstrong and produced by Sony Pictures Imageworks, wins the Academy Award for Best Animated Short.

=== April ===
- April 6: The Futurama episode "The Why of Fry" premieres, guest starring actor and comedian Bob Odenkirk. It reveals that Fry's cryogenic freezing and arrival in the 31st century was not an accident, but a calculated plot by Nibbler to save the universe.
- April 7: Noggin was rebranded.
  - Moose and Zee make their debuts.
  - The first episode of the stop-motion version of Miffy and Friends is broadcast to critical acclaim.
- April 9: South Park's 100th episode "I'm a Little Bit Country" premieres on Comedy Central, Norman Lear guest stars as Benjamin Franklin.
- April 12: The first episode of the Rugrats spin-off, All Grown Up! is broadcast on Nickelodeon. before its regular run began on November 9, 2003.

=== May ===
- Unknown date of May: Happy Tree Friends Volume 2 - Second Serving was theatrically released for first time with episodes 16 to 27 of the Internet Season 1, and episodes 1 to 5 of Season 2.
- May 7: Ray Harryhausen receives a star on the Hollywood Walk of Fame.
- May 18:
  - During the Cannes Film Festival Interstella 5555: The 5tory of the 5ecret 5tar 5ystem, a Japanese-French animated feature film directed by Daisuke Nishio, Hirotoshi Rissen, Kazuhisa Takenouchi and Leiji Matsumoto, set to a soundtrack by Daft Punk, is released.
  - King of the Hill concludes its seventh season on Fox with the following episodes:
    - "Maid in Arlen", guest starring Amy Hill. Was watched by over 4.8 million viewers.
    - "The Witches of East Arlen", guest starring David Cross. Was watched by over 7 million viewers.
  - The Simpsons concludes its 14th season on Fox with the following episodes:
    - "The Bart of War"; Was watched by exactly 12.1 million viewers.
    - "Moe Baby Blues", guest starring Joe Mantegna. Was watched by over 13.4 million viewers.
- May 25: Season 2 of Aqua Teen Hunger Force begins on Adult Swim with the premiere of the episode "Super Birthday Snake".
- May 30: The Walt Disney Company & Pixar release Finding Nemo, directed by Andrew Stanton.

=== June ===
- June 1: The Futurama episode "The Sting" premieres, in which a mission to collect space honey from deadly space bees leads to Fry's apparent death from bee stings.
- June 10: Larryboy: The Cartoon Adventures releases its final episode.
- June 11: Sylvain Chomet's The Triplettes of Belleville premiers.
- June 13:
  - Paramount Pictures and Nickelodeon release Rugrats Go Wild. It became a commercial failure and because of this, Nickelodeon ceased production on The Wild Thornberrys and Rugrats, but continue to focus on the spinoff series All Grown Up!.
  - The Grim Adventures of Billy & Mandy spins off from Grim & Evil and into its own show on Cartoon Network. Despite being its own show now, episodes from the second season of Grim & Evil would air as part of the show.
- June 15: The Futurama episode "Three Hundred Big Boys" premieres, guest starring actress and comedian Roseanne Barr.
- June 25: Philippe Leclerc's The Rain Children premiers.
- June 26 – July 24: Ren & Stimpy "Adult Party Cartoon", a darker-toned revival of The Ren & Stimpy Show, is broadcast. However, its negative reception caused it to be cancelled after only a few episodes.

=== July ===
- July 2: Sinbad: Legend of the Seven Seas, the final traditionally animated DreamWorks film, premieres but becomes a massive flop which almost caused DreamWorks to shut down.
- July 11:
  - The first episode of Spider-Man: The New Animated Series is broadcast.
  - Evil Con Carne spins off from Grim & Evil and into its own show on Cartoon Network. Despite being its own show now, episodes from the second season of Grim & Evil would air as part of the show. Because of its mild viewership over its sister show The Grim Adventures of Billy & Mandy, it was cancelled the following year.
- July 12: The Fairly OddParents' first TV movie "Abra-Catastrophe!" premieres on Nickelodeon. Its premiere was a cable-ratings success, reeling in a total of over 4 million viewers that night.
- July 19: The first episode of Teen Titans is broadcast. It will become a cult classic.
- July 26: SpongeBob SquarePants concludes its second season on Nickelodeon with the premiere of the episode "Gary Takes a Bath". The episode originally premiered on Nicktoons on June 17, 2002.

=== August ===
- August 1: The first episode of My Life as a Teenage Robot premieres on Nickelodeon.
- August 10: Futurama was abruptly cancelled after four seasons on Fox. It would later have a revival on Comedy Central in 2010.
- August 23: The first episodes of Funky Cops and Duck Dodgers are broadcast.
- August 25: The first episode of Martin Morning is broadcast.

=== September ===
- Unknown date of September/October: Happy Tree Friends Volume 2 - Second Serving renews its theatrical release by adding episodes 6 and 7 of the Internet Season 2, Intimate Spotlight and the first Buddhist Monkey episode (Enter the Garden).
- September 1: The first episodes of Clifford's Puppy Days, The Koala Brothers, My Dad the Rock Star and Kid Paddle are broadcast.
- September 2: The first episode of Rubbadubbers is broadcast.
- September 3: The first episodes of Code Lyoko and Chilly Beach are broadcast.
- September 5: The Adventures of Jimmy Neutron, Boy Genius concludes its first season on Nickelodeon with the half-hour special "Sorry, Wrong Era".
- September 7: The first episode of Jakers! The Adventures of Piggley Winks is broadcast.
- September 8: The first episode of Connie the Cow is broadcast.
- September 15: The first episode of The Secret World of Benjamin Bear is broadcast.
- September 16: The first episode of Auld Ones is broadcast.
- September 19: Season 2 of The Adventures of Jimmy Neutron, Boy Genius begins on Nickelodeon with the premiere of the half-hour special "Beach Party Mummy".
- September 21: The first episode of Ratz is broadcast.
- September 28: The first episode of JoJo's Circus is broadcast.
- September 30: The Scooby-Doo direct-to-video film Scooby-Doo! and the Monster of Mexico releases on VHS and DVD.

=== October ===
- October 1:
  - The first episode of Martin Mystery is broadcast.
  - The Grim Adventures of Billy & Mandy Halloween special "Billy & Mandy's Jacked-Up Halloween" premieres on Cartoon Network. This was the series finale to Billy & Mandy's parent series Grim & Evil, but a stand-alone episode related to Grim & Evil titled "Five O' Clock Shadows" premiered the following year.
- October 10: Quentin Tarantino's Kill Bill: Volume 1 is released, which features an anime sequence, directed by Kazuto Nakazawa and produced by Production I.G.

=== November ===
- November 1:
  - The Walt Disney Company releases Brother Bear, directed by Aaron Blaise and Robert Walker. It became Disney's unique animated film for being formatted in two different aspect ratios. While Disney was trying to "bring back" the G-rating for their cartoons regularly starting with Jungle Book 2 this February owing to the majority of releasing PG-rated cartoons last year, this was not a successful approach due to compromising character deaths in this film.
  - The first episodes of Xiaolin Showdown, Kenny the Shark, and Tutenstein are broadcast.
- November 2:
  - Season 8 of King of the Hill begins on Fox with the premiere of the episode "Patch Boomhauer". The episode was watched by over 12.2 million viewers that night.
  - Season 15 of The Simpsons begins on Fox with the latest Treehouse of Horror installment "Treehouse of Horror XIV". The episode was watched by over 16.2 million viewers that night.
- November 7:
  - The first episode of Star Wars: Clone Wars premieres on Cartoon Network.
  - Season 4 of The Fairly OddParents begins on Nickelodeon (ahead of its third season finale) with the premiere of the episodes "Miss Dimmsdale/Mind Over Magic".
- November 9: The Family Guy episode "When You Wish Upon a Weinstein" premieres on Adult Swim. It was pulled from airing on Fox due to them believing the episode is Anti-semitic.
- November 10: The first episode of Sabrina's Secret Life is broadcast.
- November 14: Joe Dante's Looney Tunes: Back in Action released in theaters. This film became a financial failure and no more theatrical films featuring the Looney Tunes would be made until the release of 2021's Space Jam: A New Legacy.
- November 20: The final episode of Dexter's Laboratory premieres on Cartoon Network. Genndy Tartakovsky, the series' creator for seasons 1 and 2 and the TV movie Ego Trip, later stated in 2023 that there will not be a possibility to reboot the series due to Christine Cavanaugh's death in 2014.
- November 21: The Fairly OddParents concludes its third season on Nickelodeon with the episodes "Chip Off the Old Chip/Snow Bound". The season's finale was seen by over 3 million viewers that night.
- November 27: The first episode of Pororo the Little Penguin is broadcast.

=== December ===
- December 3: Jacques-Rémy Girerd's Prophétie des Grenouilles (Raining Cats and Frogs) premiers.
- December 16: One Froggy Evening and Tin Toy are added to the National Film Registry.
- December 17: South Park concludes its seventh season on Comedy Central with the Christmas special "It's Christmas in Canada". It was seen by over 2.3 million viewers that night.
- December 31: Aqua Teen Hunger Force concludes its second season on Adult Swim with the episodes "The Cloning" and "The Last One".

=== Specific date unknown ===
- Danish animator comic artist Borge Ring is knighted in the Order of the Dutch Lion.

== Awards ==
- Academy Award for Best Animated Feature: Spirited Away
- Academy Award for Best Animated Short Film: The ChubbChubbs!
- Animation Kobe Feature Film Award: Millennium Actress
- Annecy International Animated Film Festival Cristal du long métrage: My Life as McDull
- Annie Award for Best Animated Feature: Finding Nemo
- Goya Award for Best Animated Film: El Cid: The Legend
- Japan Media Arts Festival Animation Award: Winter Days
- Mainichi Film Awards – Animation Grand Award: Tokyo Godfathers

== Films released ==
- January 21 - 101 Dalmatians II: Patch's London Adventure (United States) (produced in 2002)
- February 11 - Baby Looney Tunes' Eggs-traordinary Adventure (United States)
- February 12 - La Légende de Parva (France and Italy)
- February 14 - The Jungle Book 2 (United States)
- March 1 - One Piece: Dead End Adventure (Japan)
- March 4 - Scooby-Doo! and the Legend of the Vampire (United States)
- March 8 - Doraemon: Nobita and the Windmasters (Japan)
- March 18 - Charlotte's Web 2: Wilbur's Great Adventure (United States)
- March 20 - Little Longnose (Russia)
- March 21 - Piglet's Big Movie (United States)
- March 27 - The Little Polar Bear: The Dream of Flying (Germany)
- March 31 - Miss Spider's Sunny Patch Kids (Canada)
- April 18 - Hajime no Ippo – Champion Road (Japan)
- April 19:
  - Crayon Shin-chan: The Storm Called: Yakiniku Road of Honor (Japan)
  - Detective Conan: Crossroad in the Ancient Capital (Japan)
- April 20 - The Cunning Little Vixen (United Kingdom)
- April 25:
  - Jake's Booty Call (United States)
  - Oseam (South Korea)
- May 20:
  - Atlantis: Milo's Return (United States)
  - VeggieTales: The Wonderful World of Auto-Tainment! (United States)
- May 21 - Dominator (United Kingdom)
- May 28 - Interstella 5555: The 5tory of the 5ecret 5tar 5ystem (Japan and France)
- May 30 - Finding Nemo (United States)
- June 3:
  - The Animatrix (United States and Japan)
  - Rolie Polie Olie: The Baby Bot Chase (Canada and United States)
- June 4 - Kaena: The Prophecy (France and Canada)
- June 5 - Cesante (Chile)
- June 11 - The Triplets of Belleville (France, Belgium, Canada and United Kingdom)
- June 13 - Rugrats Go Wild (United States)
- June 25 - The Rain Children (France and South Korea)
- June 27 - Otherworld (United Kingdom)
- July 2 - Sinbad: Legend of the Seven Seas (United States)
- July 4 - El Embrujo del Sur (Spain)
- July 17:
  - Werner – Gekotzt wird später! (Germany)
  - Wonderful Days (South Korea and United States)
- July 19 - Pokémon: Jirachi—Wish Maker (Japan)
- August 5 - VeggieTales: The Ballad of Little Joe (United States)
- August 19 - Back to School with Franklin (Canada)
- August 20 - Hammerboy (South Korea)
- August 26 - Stitch! The Movie (United States)
- August 29 - Son of Aladdin (India)
- September 9 - Elysium (South Korea)
- September 16 - Bionicle: Mask of Light (United States)
- September 19 - Little Bee Julia & Lady Life (Italy)
- September 25 - Jester Till (Germany and Belgium)
- September 27 - G.I. Joe: Spy Troops (United States)
- September 30:
  - Barbie of Swan Lake (United States)
  - Scooby-Doo! and the Monster of Mexico (United States)
- October - The Legend of the Sky Kingdom (Zimbabwe)
- October 2 - Globi and the Stolen Shadows (Germany, Switzerland and Luxembourg)
- October 10 - Mécanix (Canada)
- October 21 - Batman: Mystery of the Batwoman (United States)
- October 22 - The Dog, the General, and the Birds (Italy and France)
- October 31 - Betizu izar artean (Spain)
- November - A Very Wompkee Christmas (United States)
- November 1 - Brother Bear (United States)
- November 8 - Tokyo Godfathers (Japan)
- November 14 - Looney Tunes: Back in Action (United States)
- November 18 - Rescue Heroes: The Movie (Canada)
- November 19 - Wizards & Giants (Mexico)
- November 20 - The Little Polar Bear: Nanouk's Rescue (Germany)
- November 27 - Winter Days (Japan)
- November 28 - Kim Possible: A Sitch in Time (United States)
- December 2 - The Land Before Time X: The Great Longneck Migration (United States)
- December 3 - Raining Cats and Frogs (France)
- December 5 - Opopomoz (Italy, France, and Spain)
- December 7 - Más vampiros en La Habana (Cuba and Spain)
- December 8 - My Little Pony: A Charming Birthday (United States)
- December 9:
  - I Want a Dog for Christmas, Charlie Brown (United States)
  - LeapFrog: The Letter Factory (United States)
  - Recess: All Growed Down (United States)
  - Recess: Taking the 5th Grade (United States)
- December 13 - Hamtaro: Miracle in Aurora Valley (Japan)
- December 19:
  - The 3 Wise Men (France and Spain)
  - El Cid: The Legend (Spain)
  - Toto Sapore and the Magic Story of Pizza (Italy)
- December 20:
  - InuYasha the Movie: Swords of an Honorable Ruler (Japan)
  - Master Q: Incredible Pet Detective (Hong Kong)
- December 21 - Nasu: Summer in Andalusia (Japan)
- December 25 - Bolívar: el héroe (Colombia)
- December 26 - Captain Sabertooth (Norway)
- December 31 - LeapFrog: The Talking Words Factory (United States)
- Specific date unknown:
  - The Return of Mushsnail: The Legend of The Snowmill (United States)
  - The Souricière (France)

== Television series debuts ==
Date	Title	Channel	Year
January 6	The Berenstain Bears (2003)	PBS Kids	2003–2004
January 13	Lupin the Third Part II	Adult Swim	2003
February 1	.hack//Sign	Cartoon Network	2003
February 8	Teenage Mutant Ninja Turtles (2003)	FoxBox, The CW4Kids	2003–2009
February 10	Reign: The Conqueror	Adult Swim	2003–2004
February 16	The Venture Bros.	Adult Swim	2003–2018
February 21	Corneil & Bernie	Nicktoons	2003–2016
March 1	Stuart Little: The Animated Series	HBO	2003
March 4	Hey Monie!	BET	2003
March 11	The Save-Ums!	Discovery Kids	2003–2006
March 11	Strawberry Shortcake	Direct-to-Video	2003–2008
March 31	Trigun	Adult Swim	2003
April 7	Miffy and Friends	Noggin	2003–2007
April 7	Moose and Zee	Noggin	2003–2012
April 12	All Grown Up!	Nickelodeon	2003–2008
May 17	MegaMan NT Warrior	Kids' WB	2003–2005
June 3	Hey Joel	VH1	2003
June 6	Eddsworld	Newgrounds, YouTube	2003–2016, 2020–present
June 9	Android Kikaider: The Animation	Adult Swim	2003
June 13	The Grim Adventures of Billy & Mandy	Cartoon Network	2003–2008
June 26	Gary the Rat	The New TNN	2003
June 26	Ren & Stimpy "Adult Party Cartoon"	The New TNN	2003
June 26	Stripperella	The New TNN	2003–2004
June 30	Cyborg 009	Cartoon Network	2003
July 8	Franny's Feet	PBS Kids	2003–2010
July 11	Evil Con Carne	Cartoon Network	2003–2004
July 11	Free for All	Showtime	2003
July 11	Spider-Man: The New Animated Series	MTV	2003
July 19	Teen Titans	Cartoon Network	2003–2006
August 1	My Life as a Teenage Robot	Nickelodeon	2003–2009
August 4	Blue Gender	Adult Swim	2003–2004
August 5	FLCL	Adult Swim	2003–2018
August 23	Funky Cops	Fox Box	2003–2004
August 23	Duck Dodgers	Cartoon Network	2003–2005
August 30	Shaman King	Fox Box	2003–2005
September 1	Clifford's Puppy Days	PBS Kids	2003–2006
September 2	Rubbadubbers	Nick Jr.	2003–2005
September 7	Jakers! The Adventures of Piggley Winks	PBS Kids	2003–2007
September 8	Connie the Cow	Noggin	2003–2005
September 20	Lilo & Stitch: The Series	Disney Channel	2003–2006
September 21	Ratz	France 3	2003-2004
September 28	JoJo's Circus	Playhouse Disney	2003–2007
October 1	The Koala Brothers	Playhouse Disney	2003–2007
October 17	VH1 ILL-ustrated	VH1	2003–2004
October 22	Kid Notorious	Comedy Central	2003
November 1	Kenny the Shark	Discovery Kids	2003–2005
November 1	Tutenstein	Discovery Kids	2003–2008
November 1	Xiaolin Showdown	Kids' WB	2003–2006
November 1	Pokémon: Advanced	Kids' WB	2003–2004
November 7	Star Wars: Clone Wars	Cartoon Network	2003–2005
November 14	Dragon Ball GT	Cartoon Network, Nicktoons	2003–2012

== Television series endings ==
Date	Title	Channel	Year	Notes
January 3	Cita's World	BET	1999–2003	Ended
January 16	3-South	MTV	2002–2003	Cancelled
January 23	George Shrinks	PBS Kids	2000–2003	Cancelled
February 2	Super Duper Sumos	Nickelodeon	2002–2003	Cancelled
February 5	The Legend of Tarzan	UPN	2001–2003	Ended
February 6	Girlstuff/Boystuff	YTV	2002–2003	Ended
February 25	Clifford the Big Red Dog	PBS Kids	2000–2003	Ended
March 1	Poochini	Syndiaction	2000–2003	Ended
March 24	Stargate Infinity	FoxBox	2002–2003	Ended
April 4	Liberty's Kids	PBS Kids	2002–2003	Ended
April 13	Clone High	MTV	2002–2003	Cancelled, until revived by Max in 2023.
April 15	Hey Monie!	BET	2003	Cancelled
May 24	Stuart Little: The Animated Series	HBO	2003	Cancelled
June 17	Hey Joel	VH1	2003	Cancelled
July 24	Ren & Stimpy "Adult Party Cartoon"	TNN	2003	Cancelled
August 10	Futurama	Fox	1999–2003	Cancelled, until revived by Comedy Central in 2010.
August 22	Spider-Man: The New Animated Series	MTV	2003	Cancelled
September 12	Free for All	Showtime	2003	Cancelled
October 6	Seven Little Monsters	PBS Kids	2000–2003	Cancelled
October 24	House of Mouse	Toon Disney	2001–2003	Ended
October 25	X-Men: Evolution	Kids' WB	2000–2003	Ended
October 25	Pokémon: Master Quest	Kids' WB	2002–2003	Ended
November 7	Little Bear	Nick Jr.	1995–2003	Ended
November 9	Family Guy	Fox	1999–2003; 2005–present	Cancelled, until revived in 2005.
November 14	Whatever Happened to... Robot Jones?	Cartoon Network	2002–2003	Cancelled
November 20	Dexter's Laboratory	Cartoon Network	1996–1999; 2001–2003	Ended
November 23	ToonHeads	Cartoon Network	1992–2003	Ended
November 26	Time Squad	Cartoon Network	2001–2003	Cancelled
December 11	Gary the Rat	Spike TV	2003	Cancelled
December 12	Transformers: Armada	Cartoon Network	2002–2003	Cancelled
December 15	Kaput & Zösky	Nicktoons	2002–2003	Cancelled
December 17	Kid Notorious	Comedy Central	2003	Cancelled
December 31	The Brak Show	Adult Swim	2000–2003	Cancelled

== Television season premieres ==
Date	Title	Season	Channel
February 3	The Wild Thornberrys	5	Nickelodeon
February 24	Dora the Explorer	3	Nickelodeon
March 19	South Park	7	Comedy Central
May 25	Aqua Teen Hunger Force	2	Adult Swim (Cartoon Network)
May 30	ChalkZone	2	Nickelodeon
June 14	Samurai Jack	4	Cartoon Network
July 18	Kim Possible	2	Disney Channel
August 9	As Told by Ginger	3	Nickelodeon
September 5	The Powerpuff Girls	5	Cartoon Network
September 19	The Adventures of Jimmy Neutron, Boy Genius	2	Nickelodeon
October 3	Codename: Kids Next Door	2	Cartoon Network
October 3	Whatever Happened to... Robot Jones?	2	Cartoon Network
October 6	Dora the Explorer	4	Nickelodeon
October 20	Grim & Evil (Note: Its segments The Grim Adventures of Billy & Mandy & Evil Con Carne became their own shows for the premiere of its second season in the US.)	2	Cartoon Network (UK)
November 2	King of the Hill	8	Fox
November 2	The Simpsons	15	Fox
November 7	The Fairly OddParents	4	Nickelodeon

== Television season finales ==
Date	Title	Season	Channel
January 20	The Fairly OddParents	2	Nickelodeon
March 7	Codename: Kids Next Door	1	Cartoon Network
May 16	Kim Possible	1	Disney Channel
May 18	King of the Hill	7	Fox
May 18	The Simpsons	14	Fox
June 29	As Told by Ginger	2	Nickelodeon
July 14	Dora the Explorer	2	Nickelodeon
July 26	SpongeBob SquarePants	2	Nickelodeon
August 16	Samurai Jack	3	Cartoon Network
September 5	The Adventures of Jimmy Neutron, Boy Genius	1	Nickelodeon
November 2	ChalkZone	2	Nickelodeon
November 11	Teen Titans	1	Cartoon Network
November 21	The Fairly OddParents	3	Nickelodeon
December 12	Blue's Clues	5	Nickelodeon
December 17	South Park	7	Comedy Central
December 31	Aqua Teen Hunger Force	2	Adult Swim (Cartoon Network)

== Births ==
=== January ===
- January 2: Cyrus Arnold, American actor (voice of Jawbreaker in Transformers: EarthSpark, Teen Driver in Diary of a Wimpy Kid).
- January 24: Johnny Orlando, Canadian actor and musician (voice of Whyatt in season 3 of Super Why!, Travis in Bunyan and Babe).

=== February ===
- February 1: Sydney Mikayla, American actress (voice of Wolf in Kipo and the Age of Wonderbeasts, Robby Malto in Transformers: EarthSpark, Maya in Craig of the Creek, Joy in The Loud House, Kit in the We Bare Bears episode "Baby Bears Can't Jump", Andy Smith in Invincible Fight Girl).
- February 4: Kyla Kenedy, American actress (voice of Piper in If You Give a Mouse a Cookie).

=== April ===
- April 3: Elsie Fisher, American actress (voice of Masha in Masha and the Bear, Parker in The Addams Family, first voice of Agnes in the Despicable Me franchise).
- April 19: Caleel Harris, American actor (voice of AJ in Blaze and the Monster Machines, Clyde McBride in seasons 1-3 of The Loud House).

=== May ===
- May 24: Cole Sand, American actor (voice of Eli Pepperjack in Tales of Arcadia, Nicholas Barnsworth in Santa's Apprentice and The Magic Snowflake, additional voices in Minions and Hotel Transylvania 2).

=== June ===
- June 11: Breanna Yde, American actress (voice of Ronnie Anne in seasons 1-3 of The Loud House, Little Mariah in All I Want for Christmas Is You).

=== July ===
- July 1: Storm Reid, American actress (voice of Nia in The Bravest Knight, Emily in The Proud Family: Louder and Prouder episode "Juneteenth").

=== August ===
- August 18: Max Charles, American actor (voice of Sherman in Mr. Peabody & Sherman and The Mr. Peabody & Sherman Show, the title character in Harvey Beaks, Kion in The Lion Guard).
- August 23: Quvenzhané Wallis, American actress (voice of Harper in Trolls, Almitra in The Prophet).

=== September ===
- September 3: Jack Dylan Grazer, American actor (voice of Alberto Scorfano in Luca, Barney Pudowski in Ron's Gone Wrong).
- September 5: Philip Solomon, American actor (voice of Craig Williams in Craig of the Creek).
- September 8: Nicolas Cantu, American actor (voice of Rowan Freemaker in Lego Star Wars: The Freemaker Adventures, James in Sofia the First, Dak in DreamWorks Dragons: Rescue Riders, Paco in Future-Worm!, Leonardo in Teenage Mutant Ninja Turtles: Mutant Mayhem, B.O.Y.D. in the DuckTales episode "Happy Birthday, Doofus Drake!", continued voice of Gumball Watterson in The Amazing World of Gumball).
- September 17: Brianna Denski, American actress (voice of June Bailey in Wonder Park).
- September 30:
  - Bella Ramsey, English actor (voice of the title character in Hilda, Princess Gizana in Princess Emmy, Molly in Chicken Run: Dawn of the Nugget, young Ramona in the Summer Camp Island episode "Ghost Baby Jabberwock").
  - Lyric Ross, American actress (voice of Kat Elliot in Wendell & Wild).

== Deaths ==
=== January ===
- January 20: Al Hirschfeld, American caricaturist, (artistic consultant for the "Rhapsody in Blue" segment in Fantasia 2000 which was inspired by his designs), dies at age 99.
- January 25: Cliff Norton, American actor (voice of Woggle-Bird in Jack and the Beanstalk, Dr. Kakofonous A. Dischord in The Phantom Tollbooth, Ed Huddles in Where's Huddles?, Crow #2 in The Mouse and His Child, Timothy in Pandamonium), dies at age 84.

=== February ===
- February 24: Imogene Lynn, American singer (singing voice of Red in Tex Avery's cartoons), dies at age 80.
- February 27: Fred Rogers, American television host, author, producer and minister (voiced himself in the Arthur episode "Arthur Meets Mister Rogers"), dies from stomach cancer at age 74.

=== March ===
- March 9: Stan Brakhage, American film director and animator (Mothlight), dies at age 70.
- March 12:
  - Lynne Thigpen, American actress (voice of Luna in Bear in the Big Blue House, Judge in the King of the Hill episode "Hank's Dirty Laundry"), dies from cerebral hemorrhage at age 54.
  - Branco Karabajic, Croatian comic book artist and animator (worked on Veliki Mitting), dies at age 77.
  - Thomas Warkentin, American comic book artist, comic book writer and animator (Filmation, Warner Bros. Animation), dies at age 67.
- March 23: Nelda Ridley, American animation checker (Bakshi Animation, Hanna-Barbera, Cartoon Network Studios), dies at age 65.
- March 28: Bob Matz, American animator (Warner Bros. Cartoons, DePatie-Freleng, Peanuts specials), dies at age 90.
- March 30: Michael Jeter, American actor (voice of Smokey and Steamer in The Polar Express, Biederman in The Wild Thornberrys, William Blay in the Duckman episode "Ajax & Ajaxer", Runta in the Aladdin episode "Stinker Belle"), dies at age 50.

=== April ===
- April 15: Maurice Rapf, American screenwriter (Walt Disney Animation Studios, Gnomes), dies at age 88.
- April 16: David Brown, American businessman (co-founder of Blue Sky Studios), dies at age 64.
- April 20: Johnny Douglas, English composer (Marvel Productions), dies at age 82.
- April 24: Gary Sperling, American television writer (Disney Television Animation), dies at age 45.
- April 30: Lionel Wilson, American actor (voiced all characters in Tom Terrific, Vincent van Gopher and Possible Possum in Deputy Dawg, Eustace Bagge in Courage the Cowardly Dog), dies at age 79.

=== May ===
- May 11: Joe Denton, American background artist (Ghostbusters, She-Ra: Princess of Power, Warner Bros. Animation) and storyboard artist (Camp Candy, Warner Bros. Animation, Jumanji, Sabrina: The Animated Series, Family Guy), dies at age 65.
- May 14:
  - Dante Quinterno, Argentine animator, comics artist, and publisher, created the first animated color film of Latin America (Upa en apuros), dies at age 93.
  - Robert Stack, American actor (voice of Ultra Magnus in The Transformers: The Movie, ATF Agent Fleming in Beavis and Butt-Head Do America, Bob the Narrator in Hercules, Superintendent in Recess: School's Out, Stoat Muldoon in Butt-Ugly Martians, General in the Recess episode "A Genius Among Us", Narrator in The Angry Beavers episode "Home Loners", Reynolds Penland in the King of the Hill episode "The Trouble with Gribbles", Gordon/The Silver Shield in the Teamo Supremo episode "The Grandfather Show"), dies from heart failure at age 84.
- May 27: Dave Monahan, American screenwriter (Warner Bros. Cartoons), dies at age 85.

=== June ===
- June 30: Buddy Hackett, American actor and comedian (voice of Pardon-Me-Pete in Jack Frost, Scuttle in The Little Mermaid), dies at age 78.

=== July ===
- July 4: Barry White, American singer and songwriter (voice of Samson and Brother Bear in Coonskin, himself in The Simpsons episodes "Whacking Day" and "Krusty Gets Kancelled"), dies from cardiac arrest at age 58.
- July 24: Irving Dressler, American animator and comics artist (Fleischer Studios, Famous Studios, Hal Seeger), dies at age 90.
- July 27: Bob Hope, English-American comedian, vaudevillian, actor, singer and dancer (voiced himself in The Simpsons episode "Lisa the Beauty Queen"), dies from pneumonia at age 100.
- July 31: Guido Crepax, Italian comics artist and animator, dies at age 70.

=== August ===
- August 9: Gregory Hines, American dancer, actor, choreographer and singer (voice of Big Bill in Little Bill), dies from liver cancer at age 57.
- August 24: Robert C. Bruce, American actor (narrator of various Looney Tunes and Merrie Melodies cartoons), dies at age 88.

=== September ===
- September 6:
  - Jules Engel, American sculptor, graphic artist, set designer, animator, film director (Walt Disney Animation Studios, Charles Mintz Studios, UPA) and founder of the Experimental Animation Program at CalArts, dies at age 94.
  - Harry Goz, American actor (voice of Mayor Huffenmeier in Buster & Chauncey's Silent Night, Captain Hazel "Hank" Murphy in Sealab 2021), dies from multiple myeloma at age 71.
- September 8: Jaclyn Linetsky, Canadian actress (voice of the title character in Caillou, Meg in Mega Babies, second voice of Lori in What's with Andy?), dies in a car accident at age 17.
- September 11: John Ritter, American actor (voice of Peter Dickinson in The Flight of Dragons, Inspector Gil in Fish Police, Eugene Grandy in King of the Hill, the title character in Clifford the Big Red Dog and Clifford's Really Big Movie, Great Uncle Stew in Stanley's Dinosaur Round-Up, Dr. David Wheeler in the Batman Beyond episode "The Last Resort"), dies at age 54.
- September 12: Johnny Cash, American country singer (voice of the Space Coyote in The Simpsons episode "El Viaje Misterioso de Nuestro Jomer (The Mysterious Voyage of Homer)"), dies at age 71.
- September 25: George Plimpton, American journalist, writer, literary editor, actor and occasional amateur sportsman (voiced himself in The Simpsons episode "I'm Spelling as Fast as I Can"), dies at age 76.
- September 29: Wesley Tuttle, American country singer (did the yodeling in Snow White and the Seven Dwarfs), dies at age 85.
- September 30: Edwin Gillette, American inventor, cameraman and animator (Cambria Studios, inventor of the Syncro-Vox technique), dies at age 94.

=== October ===
- October 3: Florence Stanley, American actress (voice of Mrs. Packard in Atlantis: The Lost Empire and Atlantis: Milo's Return, Waitress in A Goofy Movie), dies from a stroke at age 79.
- October 16: Carl Urbano, American animator and director (A Is for Atom, Hanna-Barbera), dies at age 92.
- October 26: Ted C. Bemiller, American animation checker, camera operator (Crusader Rabbit, Hanna-Barbera, The Beatles, MGM Animation/Visual Arts, Filmation, Who Framed Roger Rabbit, The Simpsons, Looney Tunes), cinematographer (Fritz the Cat) and production manager (Garfield and Friends), dies at age 79.
- October 27: Rod Roddy, American radio and television announcer (voice of Mike the Microphone in House of Mouse, Johnny in the Garfield and Friends episode "Over the Rainbow"), dies from colon cancer at age 66.

=== November ===
- November 12:
  - Kay E. Kuter, American actor (voice of Grimsby in The Little Mermaid, Santa Claus in Annabelle's Wish, Ego the Living Planet in the Fantastic Four episode "To Battle the Living Planet"), dies at age 78.
  - Penny Singleton, American actress and labor leader (voice of Jane Jetson in The Jetsons), dies at age 95.
  - Jonathan Brandis, American actor (voice of Mozenrath in Aladdin), dies at age 27.
- November 18: Michael Kamen, American composer, orchestral arranger, orchestral conductor, songwriter and session musician (The Iron Giant), dies from a heart attack at age 55.
- November 30: Kin Platt, American caricaturist, radio writer, television writer, comics artist and animation writer (Walt Disney Animation, Hanna-Barbera, Terrytoons, Milton the Monster), dies at age 91.

=== December ===
- December 17: Alan Tilvern, English actor (portrayed R.K. Maroon in Who Framed Roger Rabbit, voice of Innkeeper in The Lord of the Rings), dies at age 85.
- December 19: Les Tremayne, English actor (voice of The Ghost of Christmas Present in Mr. Magoo's Christmas Carol, Humbug in The Phantom Tollbooth, Chester C. Cricket and Harry Cat in The Cricket in Times Square, A Very Merry Cricket, and Yankee Doodle Cricket, Alexander Graham Wolf, and Santa Claus in Raggedy Ann and Andy in The Great Santa Claus Caper, the title character in Raggedy Ann and Andy in The Pumpkin Who Couldn't Smile, the Wishing Well in Daffy Duck's Movie: Fantastic Island, Orin in Rainbow Brite and the Star Stealer, Arthur in Starchaser: The Legend of Orin, Gustav in Tis the Season to Be Smurfy), dies at age 90.
- December 22: Wah Chang, Chinese-American designer, sculptor, animator and animation producer (Pinocchio, Bambi), dies at age 86.
- December 27: Pete Alvarado, American comics artist and animator (Walt Disney Company, Warner Bros. Cartoons, DePatie-Freleng, Republic Pictures, Hanna-Barbera, Ruby-Spears Productions, Filmation), dies at age 83.
- December 29: Bob Monkhouse, British actor and writer (voice of Mr. Hell in Aaagh! It's the Mr. Hell Show, Johnny Saveloy in Rex the Runt), dies at age 75.
- Specific date unknown: Oliver Passingham, British comics artist and animator, dies at age 78.

=== Specific date unknown ===
- Claude Smith, American animator (Walt Disney Animation Studios, MGM), dies at age 90.

== See also ==
- 2003 in anime
