= List of science fiction television programs, F =

This is an inclusive list of science fiction television programs whose names begin with the letter F.

== F ==
Live-action

- A Fairly Odd Movie: Grow Up, Timmy Turner! (2011, film)
- Falling Skies (2011–2015)
- Fantastic Journey, The (1977)
- Fantasy Island (1977)
- Fantasy Island (1998)
- Far Out Space Nuts (1975–1976)
- Farscape (franchise):
  - Farscape (1999–2003, Australia/US)
  - Farscape: The Peacekeeper Wars (2004, miniseries)
- Final Fantasy (franchise):
- Fireball XL5 (1962–1963, puppetry)
- Firefly (2002–2003)
- Firestarter: Rekindled (2002, miniseries)
- First, The (2018)
- First Wave (1998–2001, Canada/US)
- Flash, The (franchise):
  - Flash, The (1990–1991)
  - Flash, The (2014–2023)
- Flash Gordon (franchise):
  - Flash Gordon (1954–1955)
  - Flash Gordon (2007–2008, US/Canada)
- FlashForward (2009–2010)
- For All Mankind (2019–present)
- Foundation (2021–present)
- Frank Herbert's Dune (franchise):
  - Frank Herbert's Dune (2000, miniseries)
  - Frank Herbert's Children of Dune (2003, miniseries)
- Frankenstein (franchise) (elements of science fiction):
  - Frankenstein: The True Story (1973, UK, film)
  - Struck by Lightning (1979)
  - Frankenstein (1993, US, film) IMDb
  - House of Frankenstein (1997, NBC, miniseries)
  - Frankenstein (2004, USA Network, film)
  - Frankenstein (2004, Hallmark Channel, miniseries)
  - Frankenstein (2007, ITV, film)
  - Mary Shelley's Frankenhole (2010–12)
- Freaky (2003, New Zealand)
- FreakyLinks (2000–2001) (elements of science fiction in some episodes)
- Freddy's Nightmares (1988–1990)
- Freedom (2000)
- Frequency (2016–2017)
- Friday the 13th: The Series (1987–1990, Canada)
- Fringe (2008–2013)
- FTL Newsfeed (1992–1996, clip)
- Future Cop (1976–1978)
- Future Man (2017–2020)

Animated

- Fairly OddParents, The (franchise) (elements of science fiction):
  - Jimmy Timmy Power Hour, The (2004, film, animated)
  - Jimmy Timmy Power Hour 2: When Nerds Collide, The (2006, film, animated)
  - Jimmy Timmy Power Hour 3: The Jerkinators, The (2007, film, animated)
  - Fairly OddParents, The (2001–2017, animated)
  - Fairly OddParents: Abra-Catastrophe!, The (2003, film, animated)
  - Channel Chasers (2004, film, animated)
  - School's Out! The Musical (2005, film, animated)
  - Fairy Idol (2006, film, animated)
  - Fairly OddBaby (2008, film, animated)
  - Fairly OddParents: Wishology, The (2009, film, animated)
- Family Guy (1999–present, animated) (franchise) (elements of science fiction in some episodes):
  - Blue Harvest (2007, episode, animated)
  - Something, Something, Something, Dark Side (2010, episode, animated)
  - It's a Trap! (2011, episode, animated)
- Family's Defensive Alliance, The (2001, Japan, animated)
- Fang of the Sun Dougram (1981–1983, Japan, animated)
- Fantastic Four (franchise):
  - Fantastic Four (1967–1970, animated)
  - Fantastic Four (1978, animated)
  - Fantastic Four (1994–1996, animated)
  - Fantastic Four: World's Greatest Heroes (2006–2007, animated)
- Fantastic Max (1988–1990, animated)
- Fantastic Voyage (1968–1969, animated)
  - Final Fantasy: Unlimited (2001–2002, Japan, animated) (elements of science fiction in some episodes)
- Final Space (2018–2021, animated)
- Fireball (franchise):
  - Fireball (2009, Japan/US, animated)
  - Fireball Charming (2011, Japan/US, animated)
- Firebreather (2010, film, animated)
- Firestorm (2002–2003, Japan/UK, animated)
- Fist of the North Star (franchise):
  - Fist of the North Star (1984–1987, Japan, animated)
  - Fist of the North Star 2 (1987–1988, Japan, animated)
  - Legends of the Dark King: A Fist of the North Star Story (2008, Japan, animated)
- Flash Gordon (franchise):
  - New Adventures of Flash Gordon, The a.k.a. Adventures of Flash Gordon, The a.k.a. Flash Gordon (1979–1980, animated)
  - Flash Gordon: The Greatest Adventure of All (1982, animated)
  - Flash Gordon a.k.a. The Adventures of Flash Gordon, The (1996–1997, US/France/Canada, animated)
- Freedom Force, The (1978, animated, Tarzan and the Super 7 segment)
- Freedom Project (2006–2008, Japan, animated)
- Freezing (2011–2013, Japan, animated)
- Frisky Dingo (franchise):
  - Frisky Dingo (2006–2008, animated)
  - Xtacles, The (2008, spin-off, animated)
- Full Metal Panic! a.k.a. FMP! (franchise):
  - Full Metal Panic? Fumoffu (2003, Japan, animated)
  - Full Metal Panic!: The Second Raid (2006, Japan, animated)
- Fullmetal Alchemist (franchise):
  - Fullmetal Alchemist a.k.a. Hagane no Renkinjutsushi (2003–2004, Japan, animated)
  - Fullmetal Alchemist: Brotherhood a.k.a. Hagane no Renkinjutsushi: Furumetaru Arukemisuto (2009–2010, Japan, animated)
- Futurama (1999–2003, 2008–2013, 2023-present, animated)
- Future Boy Conan (1978, Japan, animated)
- Future is Wild, The (franchise):
  - Future is Wild, The (2003–2004, UK/Austria/Germany, docufiction, animated)
  - Future is Wild, The (2007–2008, US, docufiction, animated)
