= 2003 in anime =

The events of 2003 in anime.

== Accolades ==
At the Mainichi Film Awards, Tokyo Godfathers won the Animation Film Award and Winter Days won the Ōfuji Noburō Award. Internationally, Millennium Actress was nominated for the Annie Award for Best Animated Feature, the third consecutive year an anime was nominated for the award.

== Releases ==
This list contains numerous notable entries of anime which debuted in 2003. It is not a complete list and represents popular works that debuted as TV, OVA and Movie releases. Web content, DVD specials, TV specials are not on this list.

=== Films ===
Release date	Title	Studio	Director(s)	Running time (minutes)
March 1	One Piece: Dead End Adventure	Toei Animation	Konosuke Uda	95
April 19	Crayon Shin-chan: The Storm Called: Yakiniku Road of Honor	Shin-Ei Animation	Tsutomu Mizushima	90
April 19	Detective Conan: Crossroad in the Ancient Capital	TMS Entertainment	Kenji Kodama	108
April 19	RahXephon: Pluralitas Concentio	Bones	Yutaka Izubuchi (Chief); Tomoki Kyoda	116
July 19	Pokémon: Jirachi Wish Maker			
October 11	Ougon no Hou: El Cantare no Rekishikan	Group TAC	Keizō Shimizu (Satoru Arisa, Zhi-yi); Marisuke Eguchi (Prometheus); Masami Suda (Hermes, Buddha); Yukiyoshi Hane (Jesus, Moses)	110
November 8	Tokyo Godfathers	Madhouse	Satoshi Kon	92
November 22	Fuyu no Hi	Imagica	Kihachiro Kawamoto	39
December 1	Interstella 5555: The 5tory of the 5ecret 5tar 5ystem	Toei Animation	Kazuhisa Takenouchi	65
December 20	InuYasha the Movie: Swords of an Honorable Ruler	Sunrise	Toshiya Shinohara	98
December 20	Kochira Katsushikaku Kameari Kouenmae Hashutsujo: UFO Shuurai! Tornado Daisakusen!!	Gallop	Shinji Takamatsu	100

=== Television series ===
First run start and end dates	Title	Episodes	Studio	Director(s)	Japanese name	Ref
January 4 – March 29	Lime-iro Senkitan	13	Studio Hibari	Iku Suzuki	らいむいろ戦奇譚	
January 5 – March 30	Stratos 4	13	Studio Fantasia	Takeshi Mori	ストラトス・フォー	
January 6 – March 25	Mr. Stain on Junk Alley	13		Ryuji Masuda	ガラクタ通りのステイン	
January 6 – December 29	Beyblade G-Revolution	52	Nippon Animation	Toshifumi Kawase; Mitsuo Hashimoto	爆転シュート ベイブレードGレボリューション	
January 6 – March 24	MØUSE	12	Studio Deen	Yorifusa Yamaguchi	マウス	
January 7 – July 29	Wolf's Rain	26	Bones	Tensai Okamura	ウルフズレイン	
January 8 – March 26	Licensed by Royalty	12	TNK	Itsuro Kawasaki	L/R -Licensed by Royal-	
January 8 – January 3, 2004	Machine Robo Rescue	53	Sunrise	Mamoru Kanbe	出撃!マシンロボレスキュー	
January 9 – March 27	Nanaka 6/17	12	J.C.Staff	Hiroaki Sakurai	ななか6/17	
January 9 – March 27	.hack//Legend Of The Twilight	12	Bee Train	Kouji Sawai	.hack//黄昏の腕輪伝説	
January 10 – March 28	Someday's Dreamers	12	J.C.Staff	Masami Shimoda	魔法遣いに大切なこと	
January 10 – December 26	Transformers Armada	52	Actas	Hidehito Ueda	超ロボット生命体トランスフォーマー マイクロン伝説	
February 2 – January 25, 2004	Crush Gear Nitro	50	Sunrise	Hideharu Iuchi	クラッシュギアNitro	
February 2 – January 25, 2004	Ashita no Nadja	50	Toei Animation	Takuya Igarashi	明日のナージャ	
February 6 – April 24	Gunparade March	12	J.C.Staff	Katsushi Sakurabi	ガンパレード・マーチ -新たなる行軍歌-	
March 6 – April 3	Tenshi no Shippo Chu!	11	Tokyo Kids	Norio Kashima	天使のしっぽChu!	
March 31 – September 26	Kappamaki	130	Trans Arts	Seiji Kishi	かっぱまき	
April 1 – September 23	E's Otherwise	26	Pierrot	Masami Shimoda	エスアザーワイズ	
April 2 – October 1	Air Master	27	Toei Animation	Daisuke Nishio	エアマスター	
April 3 – March 25, 2004	Bouken Yuuki Pluster World	52	Actas; Brain's Base	Yuji Himaki	冒険遊記プラスターワールド	
April 3 – March 27, 2004	Kaleido Star	51	Gonzo	Junichi Satō; Yoshimasa Hiraike (Season 2)	カレイドスター	
April 3 – September 25	Uchuu no Stellvia	26	Xebec	Tatsuo Satō	宇宙のステルヴィア	
April 3 – September 25	D.N.Angel	26	Xebec	Keiji Gotō (ep 20); Kōji Yoshikawa; Nobuyoshi Habara	D.N.エンジェル	
April 5 – March 27, 2004	Mugen Senki Portriss	52	Sunrise; Dongwoo A&E	Akira Shigino; Jongsik Nam	無限戦記ポトリス	
April 5 – March 27, 2004	Mermaid Melody: Pichi Pichi Pitch	52	Actas; SynergySP	Yoshitaka Fujimoto	マーメイドメロディー ぴちぴちピッチ	
April 5 – September 27	Zentrix	26	Madhouse	Felix Ip; Tony Tang	時空冒険記 ゼントリックス	
April 5 – June 21	Mousou Kagaku Series: Wandaba Style	12	TNK	Yoshihiro Takamoto	妄想科学シリーズ ワンダバスタイル	
April 5 – September 27	Mythical Detective Loki Ragnarok	26	Studio Deen	Hiroshi Watanabe	魔探偵ロキ RAGNAROK	
April 6 – September 28	Firestorm	26	Trans Arts	Kenji Terada	ファイアーストーム	
April 6 – March 28, 2004	Astro Boy	50	Tezuka Productions	Kazuya Konaka; Keiichirō Mochizuki (ep 1)	アストロボーイ・鉄腕アトム	
April 6 – March 26, 2006	Zatch Bell!	150	Toei Animation	Tetsuji Nakamura; Yukio Kaizawa	金色のガッシュベル!!	
April 6 – June 29	Human Crossing	13	A.C.G.T.	Akira Kumeichi; Kazunari Kume; Kazunari Kumi	人間交差点	
April 6 – March 28, 2004	Sonic X	78	TMS Entertainment	Hajime Kamegaki	ソンイックx	
April 6 – March 28, 2004	Di Gi Charat Nyo!	104	Madhouse	Hiroaki Sakurai	デ・ジ・キャラットにょ	
April 7 – September 29	Dear Boys	26	A.C.G.T.	Susumu Kudo	ディア・ボーイズ	
April 7 – March 27, 2005	Croket!	104	OLM	Naohito Takahashi	コロッケ!	
April 8 – September 30	Last Exile	26	Gonzo	Koichi Chigira	ラストエグザイル	
April 8 – July 8	Kino's Journey	13	A.C.G.T.	Ryutaro Nakamura	キノの旅 -the Beautiful World-	
April 8 – October 7	Scrapped Princess	24	Bones	Sōichi Masui	スクラップド・プリンセス	
April 9 – October 1	Kasumin (Season 3)	26	OLM	Mitsuru Hongo	カスミン (第3シリーズ)	
April 11 – February 6, 2004	Wonder Bebil-kun	30	Radix	Takahiro Ōmori	ワンダーベビルくん	
April 12 – June 28	Narue no Sekai	12	Studio Live	Toyoo Ashida	成恵の世界	
April 15 – July 15	Ninja Scroll: The Series	13	Madhouse	Tatsuo Satō	獣兵衛忍風帖「龍宝玉篇」	
April 15 – March 20, 2004	Tantei Gakuen Q	45	Pierrot	Noriyuki Abe	探偵学園Q	
April 16 – September 25	Gad Guard	26	Gonzo	Hiroshi Nishikiori	ガドガード	
April 17 – September 25	Texhnolyze	22	Madhouse	Hiroshi Hamasaki	TEXHNOLYZE	
May 2 – July 27	Umeyon Ekisu	13	TMS Entertainment		梅四エッキス	
May 8 – July 31	Submarine Super 99	13	Vega Entertainment	Hiromichi Matano	潜水艦スーパー99	
May 8 – June 13	Saint Beast: Seijuu Kourin-hen	6	Tokyo Kids	Harume Kosaka	セイント・ビースト〜聖獣降臨編〜	
May 20 – November 11	Ultra Maniac	26	Ashi Productions	Shin'ichi Masaki	ウルトラマニアック	
June 24 – September 13	Cinderella Boy	13	Magic Bus	Tsuneo Tominaga	シンデレラボーイ	
July 2 – September 24	Divergence Eve	13	Radix	Hiroshi Negishi	ダイバージェンス・イヴ	
July 3 – September 28	Happy Lesson Advance	13	Studio Hibari	Iku Suzuki	HAPPY☆LESSON ADVANCE	
July 5 – December 27	Da Capo	26	feel.; Zexcs	Nagisa Miyazaki	D.C.〜ダ・カーポ〜	
July 6 – September 28	Takahashi Rumiko Gekijou	13	TMS Entertainment	Akira Nishimori	高橋留美子劇場	
July 8 – September 30	Shadow Star Narutaru	13	Planet	Toshiaki Iino	なるたる 〜骸なる星・珠たる子〜	
July 13 – September 28	Green Green	12	Studio Matrix	Chisaku Matsumoto; Yūji Mutō	グリーングリーン	
July 13 – September 28	Sumeba Miyako no Cosmos-sou Suttoko Taisen Dokkoida	12	ufotable	Takuya Nonaka	住めば都のコスモス荘 すっとこ大戦ドッコイダー	
July 15 – October 14	Onegai Twins	12	Daume	Yasunori Ide	おねがい☆ツインズ	
July 18 – October 3	Popotan	12	Shaft	Shinichiro Kimura	ぽぽたん	
July 20 – October 22	Ikkitousen	13	J.C.Staff	Takashi Watanabe	一騎当千	
August 26 – November 18	Full Metal Panic? Fumoffu	12	Kyoto Animation	Yasuhiro Takemoto	フルメタル・パニック? ふもっふ	
September 1 – March 16, 2004	R.O.D the TV (Read Or Die)	26	J.C.Staff	Koji Masunari	アール・オー・ディー ザ・ティーヴィー	
September 15 – September 19	IGPX: Immortal Grand Prix	5	Bee Train; Production I.G	Mashimo Kouichi	IGPX: Immortal Grand Prix	
September 30 – March 30, 2004	Papuwa	26	Nippon Animation	Ken'ichi Nishida	パプワ	
October 1 – March 24, 2004	Midnight Horror School	52	Milky Cartoon	Naomi Iwata	ミッドナイトホラースクール	
October 1 – December 24	Shinkon Gattai Godannar!!	13	OLM; AIC ASTA	Yasuchika Nagaoka	神魂合体ゴーダンナー!!	
October 2 – March 25, 2004	Saiyuki Reload	25	Pierrot	Tetsuya Endō	最遊記RELOAD	
October 2 – December 25	Yami to Boushi to Hon no Tabibito	13	Studio Deen	Yuji Yamaguchi	ヤミと帽子と本の旅人	
October 2 – December 25	Avenger	13	Bee Train	Kōichi Mashimo	アヴェンジャー	
October 2 – March 18, 2004	Gilgamesh	26	Group TAC	Masahiko Murata	ギルガメッシュ	
October 3 – March 26, 2004	Cromartie High School	26	Production I.G	Hiroaki Sakurai	魁!! クロマティ高校	
October 4 – January 4, 2004	Battle Programmer Shirase	15	AIC	Hiroki Hayashi	バトルプログラマーシラセ	
October 4 – December 20	UFO Princess Valkyrie 2: Juunigatsu no Yasoukyoku	12	TNK	Nobuhiro Takagi	円盤皇女ワるきゅーレ 十二月の夜想曲	
October 4 – December 27	Binzume Yousei	13	Xebec	Yoshiaki Iwasaki	瓶詰妖精	
October 4 – September 25, 2004	Rockman.EXE Axess	51	Xebec	Takao Kato	ロックマンエグゼ Axess	
October 4 – April 17, 2004	Planetes	26	Sunrise	Goro Taniguchi	プラネテス	
October 4 – October 2, 2004	Fullmetal Alchemist	51	Bones	Seiji Mizushima	鋼の錬金術師	
October 4 – December 27	Kyougoku Natsuhiko: Kousetsu Hyaku Monogatari	13	TMS Entertainment	Hideki Tonokatsu	京極夏彦 巷説百物語	
October 5 – January 4, 2004	Kimi ga Nozomu Eien	14	Studio Fantasia	Tetsuya Watanabe	君が望む永遠	
October 5 – April 11, 2004	Ginga Tetsudou Monogatari	26	Planet	Yukio Nishimoto	銀河鉄道物語	
October 5 – December 21	Takahashi Rumiko Gekijou Ningyo no Mori	11	TMS Entertainment	Masaharu Okuwaki	高橋留美子劇場 人魚の森	
October 5 – March 28, 2004	PopoloCrois	26	TMS Entertainment	Kazuhiro Ochi	ポポロクロイス	
October 7 – September 28, 2004	F-Zero: Falcon Densetsu	51	Ashi Productions	Ami Tomobuki	F-ZERO ファルコン伝説	
October 7 – March 30, 2004	Gungrave	26	Madhouse	Toshiyuki Tsuru	ガングレイヴ	
October 8 – March 24, 2004	Peace Maker Kurogane	24	Gonzo	Tomohiro Hirata	PEACE MAKER 鐵	
October 9 – February 19, 2004	Gunslinger Girl	13	Madhouse	Morio Asaka	ガンスリンガー・ガール	
October 10 – December 26	Shingetsutan Tsukihime	12	J.C.Staff	Katsushi Sakurabi	真月譚 月姫	
October 13 – December 29	Ai Yori Aoshi: Enishi	12	J.C.Staff	Masami Shimoda	藍より青し〜縁〜	
October 14 – April 6, 2004	Maburaho	24	J.C.Staff	Shinichiro Kimura	まぶらほ	
October 16 – October 28, 2004	Mujin Wakusei Survive	52	Madhouse; Telecom Animation Film	Yuichiro Yano	無人惑星サヴァイヴ	
November 1 – March 27, 2004	Futatsu no Spica	20	Group TAC	Tomomi Mochizuki	ふたつのスピカ	
November 8 – October 15, 2005	Bobobo-bo Bo-bobo	76	Toei Animation	Hiroki Shibata	ボボボーボ・ボーボボ	
November 25 – June 10, 2004	Chrno Crusade	24	Gonzo	Yuu Kou	クロノクルセイド	

=== Original video animations ===
First run start and end dates	Title	Episodes	Studio	Director(s)	Japanese name
January 18	Hand Maid Mai	1	Tokyo Kids	Shigeru Kimiya	ハンドメイドマイ
January 22 – May 21	Memories Off 2nd	3	Picture Magic; Rikuentai	Takahiro Okao	メモリーズオフ 2nd
February 5 – April 16	Hunter x Hunter: Greed Island	8	Nippon Animation	Yukihiro Matsushita	HUNTER×HUNTER Greed Island
February 14	Early Reins	1	OLM	Yūji Asada	アーリーレインズ
March 18	Munto	1	Kyoto Animation	Yoshiji Kigami	ムント
March 19 – August 20	Sakura Taisen: Ecole de Paris	3	Radix	Hitoyuki Matsui	サクラ大戦 エコール・ド・巴里
March 21 – May 3	Piyoko ni Omakase pyo!	8	Madhouse	Hiroaki Sakurai	ぴよこにおまかせぴょ!
March 23 – February 2, 2005	Harukanaru Toki no Naka de 2: Shiroki Ryuu no Miko	3	Yumeta Company	Junko Okazaki	遙かなる時空の中で2~白き龍の神子~
March 28	Onegai☆Teacher: Reminiscence Disc	1			おねがい☆ティーチャー Reminiscenceディスク
April 25	Lingerie Senshi Papillon Rose	1	Studio Kelmadick	Shinji Tobita	ランジェリー戦士パピヨンローゼ
April 25 – October 10	Mizuiro	2	OLM	Kiyotaka Isako	みずいろ
May 21 – June 25	Generation of Chaos III: Toki no Fuuin	2	Idea Factory	Yoshiaki Sato	ジェネレーション オブ カオス III 〜 時の封印 〜
May 23 – November 28	Guardian Hearts	6	VENET	Yasuhiro Kuroda	がぁーでぃあんHearts
June 25 – June 23, 2004	Eiken	2	J.C.Staff	Kiyotaka Ōhata Alan Smithee	エイケン エイケンヴより愛をこめて
July 24 – May 28, 2004	Shin Hokuto no Ken	3	A.C.G.T.	Takashi Watanabe	新・北斗の拳
July 24	Butsu Zone	1	Xebec		仏ゾーン
July 24 – December 26	Triangle Heart: Sweet Songs Forever	4	Seven Arcs	Akiyuki Simbo	とらいあんぐるハート -Sweet Songs Forever-
	Yuuwaku	2			
	Flutter of Birds II: Tenshi-tachi no Tsubasa				
	Darling				
	Mahou Shoujo Ai				
	Wet Summer Days				
	Momiji				
	Xpress Train				
	Megami Kyouju				
October 22	Heart Cocktail Again	1	Hal Film Maker	Nishikubo Mizuho	ハートカクテルアゲイン
October 24 – April 23, 2004	Kingdom of Chaos: Born to Kill	4	Idea Factory	Taisuke Katou	キングダム・オブ・カオス 〜ボーン・トゥー・キル〜
November 16	.hack//Gift	1	Bee Train	Kōichi Mashimo; Shinya Kawatsura	.hack//GIFT
November 19 – February 18, 2004	Kidou Shinsengumi Moeyo Ken	4	Trinet Entertainment; Picture Magic	Hideki Tonokatsu	機動新撰組 萌えよ剣
November 21	Aquarian Age: Saga II – Don't Forget Me...	1			
December 17	Nyancos: Hello! Our Brilliant Future	1			
December 19 – July 23, 2004	Moekan The Animation	3	Axis; Noside	Kazuhisa Ōno	モエかん THE ANIMATION
December 21 – June 25, 2004	Jungle wa Itsumo Hare nochi Guu Final	7	Shin-Ei Animation	Tsutomu Mizushima	ジャングルはいつもハレのちグゥFinal
December 22 – November 26, 2004	Comic Party Revolution	4	Chaos Project	Junichi Sakata	こみっくパーティーRevolution

== See also ==
- 2003 in animation
