= The Fairly OddParents season 5 =

The Fairly OddParents
- Season 5
- DVD cover
- Showrunner: Butch Hartman
- No. of episodes: 21 (37 segments)

Release
- Original network: Nickelodeon
- Original release: July 2, 2004 – November 25, 2006

Season chronology
- ← Previous; Season 4 Next → Season 6

The fifth season of The Fairly OddParents started on July 2, 2004. In this season, the show aired its seventh TV movie, Fairy Idol, and two Jimmy Timmy Power Hour movies. After "The Jerkinators", the series and Jimmy Neutron seem to end, but later in 2006, they aired episodes that chronologically come before the season finale. After the latter ended its run on November 25, 2006, The Fairly OddParents was sent on hiatus for 15 months, between November 2006 and February 2008.

Season 5 was the last season to be distributed by Nelvana International and so is the last to air on Disney Channel and Jetix (depending on the country).

== Episodes ==
No. overall	No. in season	Title	Directed by	Written by	Storyboard by	Original release date	Prod. code	Viewers (millions)
60	1	"Nega-Timmy"	Gary Conrad	Story by : Dave Thomas; Teleplay by : Scott Fellows & Jack Thomas	Dave Thomas & Butch Hartman	February 14, 2005 (Note: This episode was first released in Canada on October 13, 2004.)	FOP−221	N/A
60	1	"Love at First Height"	Ken Bruce	Joel Zimmer	Maureen Mascarina	February 14, 2005	FOP−222	N/A
Timmy wishes to do the opposite of what his parents tell him to do. It goes well at first, but when they tell him to be a good boy, he turns evil and attempts to destroy Dimmsdale. Note: The Bad Parent Hunter was based on the late crocodile hunter Steve Irwin. This segment (along with its sister episode) was withdrawn from later broadcast after his death on September 4, 2006. Timmy wishes he had the body of a sixteen-year-old to get on a roller coaster ride at Adrenaland (the dangerous amusement park first seen in "That Old Black Magic"). Vicky soon falls in love with him, thinking he's a Norwegian supermodel named Gah.
61	2	"You Doo!"	Gary Conrad	Scott Fellows & Jack Thomas	Heather Martinez	February 16, 2005 (Note: This episode was first released in Canada on October 21, 2004.)	FOP−224	N/A
61	2	"Just Desserts!"	Sarah Frost	Scott Fellows	Tom King	February 16, 2005	FOP−223	N/A
Timmy wishes for magical "youdoo" (voodoo) dolls to control his enemies, friends, and family, but he runs into really big problems when Tootie finds a You Doo doll of him. Timmy, unhappy that he has to eat healthy foods all the time, wishes that everyone ate nothing but desserts, which first makes everyone energetic from the sugar rush, but soon makes everyone in Dimmsdale overweight to the point where it jostles the Earth's gravitational balance and sends it hurtling towards the sun.
62	3	"Go Young, West Man!"	Sarah Frost	Jack Thomas	Aaron Rozenfeld & Butch Hartman	May 9, 2005 (Note: This episode was first released in Canada on November 2, 2004.)	FOP−226	3.17 (Note: Mistakenly listed as May 8, 2005.)
62	3	"Birthday Wish!"	Ken Bruce	Cynthia True	Brandon Kruse & Shawn Murray	May 9, 2005	FOP−225	3.17
Timmy helps Adam West become a child so then he can have a chance at the childhood he did not have in the past (as Adam West was a child actor who appeared in many TV shows). However, he convinces Timmy to skip school and go out for ice cream instead, which causes Principal Waxelplax to order truant officer Shallowgrave to follow him. Guest star: Adam West as Catman Feeling guilty about being unable to show up at Tootie's birthday party, Timmy loans his fairy godparents to Tootie for the rest of her birthday, but has to subsequently stall her before she reveals the truth.
63	4	"Blondas Have More Fun!"	Gary Conrad	Scott Fellows	Mike Manley	April 2, 2005 (Note: This episode was first released in Canada on November 10, 2004.)	FOP−227	4.72 3.09 (HH) (Note: (HH) indicates the amount of households an episode was viewed in when it premiered.)
63	4	"Five Days of F.L.A.R.G."	Ken Bruce	Scott Fellows	Maureen Mascarina	April 2, 2005	FOP−228	4.72 3.09 (HH)
Wanda switches lives with her sister Blonda, a struggling soap opera actress, but she soon learns that Blonda's life is equally as hard as hers. Guest stars: Julia Louis-Dreyfus as Blonda, Mary Hart as Fairy Hart and Bob Goen as Bob Glimmer Timmy helps Mark Chang celebrate a Yugopotamian holiday in Dimmsdale, but then finds out that each day of F.L.A.R.G has their own strange meaning that will happen to anyone who celebrates it. Timmy has to handle celebrating F.L.A.R.G with Mark, because if the alien's holiday is interrupted, his appendix will blow up and the planet will be destroyed. However, Mark intends to destroy the planet anyway to end the F.L.A.R.G celebration, so Timmy has to convince him not to destroy Earth.
64	5	"Timmy's 2-D House of Horror"	Gary Conrad	Cynthia True	Heather Martinez	May 10, 2005 (Note: This episode was first released in Canada on November 15, 2004.)	FOP−230	2.87
64	5	"It's a Wishful Life"	Sarah Frost	Jack Thomas	Tom King	May 10, 2005	FOP−229	2.87
After Vicky's house is destroyed, she and her family must move into Timmy's house. To strike back, Timmy wishes to make 3D-glasses that cause everything they see to be scary. After being criticized for his good deeds, Timmy wishes that he'd never been born, and Jorgen Von Strangle shows him what life would be like if Timmy never existed...which, devastatingly, proves beneficial for all of society.
65	6	"Escape from Unwish Island"	Ken Bruce	Scott Fellows	Shawn Murray	May 11, 2005 (Note: This episode was first released in Canada on December 3, 2004.)	FOP−231	3.26
65	6	"The Gland Plan" "Fa Giggly Gland"	Sarah Frost	Jack Thomas	Aaron Rozenfeld	May 11, 2005	FOP−232	3.26
Imaginary Gary and Timmy's Unwishes return to get Timmy's parents, Timmy's friends and Timmy's back-up friends. Timmy, Cosmo and Wanda go to the rescue Timmy's parents and friends from Imaginary Gary. Cosmo's magic gland (which helps him transform from fairy to normal objects to keep anyone who isn't Timmy from seeing him) is not working properly, and he must get a donation from Anti-Cosmo before it shuts down.
66	7	"Back to the Norm"	Gary Conrad	Jack Thomas	Dave Thomas	February 17, 2005 (Note: This episode was first released in Australia on January 14, 2005.)	FOP−234	3.92 3.05 (HH)
66	7	"Teeth for Two"	Ken Bruce	Cynthia True	Maureen Mascarina	February 17, 2005	FOP−233	N/A
Crocker and Norm try to get revenge on Timmy, but Crocker's refusal to make an effective wish causes Norm to become frustrated. Guest star: Norm MacDonald as Norm the Genie Jorgen has to stay with Cosmo and Wanda after the Tooth Fairy thinks he was doing her job (he was actually attempting to remove Timmy's teeth—allegedly the 'dental equivalent of the Hope Diamond'—to use as an engagement ring for her).
67	8	"Hassle in the Castle"	Gary Conrad	Jack Thomas	Heather Martinez	May 12, 2005 (Note: This episode was first released in Canada on March 8, 2005.)	FOP−238	2.92
67	8	"Remy Rides Again"	Sarah Frost	Jack Thomas	Tom King	May 12, 2005	FOP−236	2.92
Timmy is caught snooping inside his fairies' fishbowl castle when he accidentally brings back three past godchildren in the Hall of Infamy, one of whom was directly responsible for starting World War I. Remy Buxaplenty returns to get revenge on Timmy.
68	9	"Talkin' Trash"	Sarah Frost	Jack Thomas	Tom King & Maureen Mascarina	May 13, 2005 (Note: This episode was first released in Canada on March 30, 2005.)	FOP−240	2.83
68	9	"Timmy TV"	Ken Bruce	Cynthia True	Shawn Murray	May 13, 2005	FOP−239	2.83
Wanda's father—Big Daddy—and Timmy must clean up magical garbage in Timmy's house. Guest star: Tony Sirico as Big Daddy Timmy finds out that he is a TV star on a hidden camera show in FairyWorld, but his fame starts to change his life.
69	10	"The Masked Magician"	Butch Hartman	Scott Fellows	Dave Thomas	February 18, 2005 (Note: This episode was first released in Australia on February 4, 2005.)	FOP−235	N/A
69	10	"The Big Bash"	Ken Bruce & Juli Hashiguchi	Cynthia True	Maureen Mascarina & Shawn Murray	February 18, 2005	FOP−237	N/A
Timmy wishes to become a magician in order to drive back a group of citizens to watch his parents' magic show instead of the Dinklebergs' show, who have brought pop singer Britney Britney with them. Mr. Bickles, angry and jealous of Timmy, becomes his arch-enemy. Guest star: Jay Leno as The Crimson Chin Note: This would be Britney Britney's last major role time appearance (aside her brief cameo in "Timmy TV") in the original series' run. She would not be utilized again until the 6th season episode "Momnipresent" in 2009 before being written out from the show, mainly because of her real life counterpart's negative reputation in 2006. Timmy battles Remy Buxaplenty in a scavenger hunt, which was actually Cupid's grocery shopping. Guest star: Julie Chen as Starlet
70	11	"Crash Nebula"	Butch Hartman	Butch Hartman & Steve Marmel	Erik Wiese	July 2, 2004	FOP−173	N/A
70	11	"Crash Nebula"	Butch Hartman	Butch Hartman & Steve Marmel	Erik Wiese	July 2, 2004	FOP−174	N/A
Timmy gets ready to watch Crash Nebula but gets into an argument with Cosmo and Wanda about what episode it is. The episode chronicled Sprig Speevak, the alter-ego of the hero Crash Nebula. Note 1: Despite airing on July 2, 2004, it is considered part of Season 5 when referring to packaging order (the episode, however, was produced during season 3). Butch Hartman had attempted to create Crash Nebula as a spin-off animated series. This episode only ran a few times before Hartman cancelled the spin-off for many reasons. Note 2: This was the last episode to air on Jetix and Disney Channel internationally, and the final episode syndicated as a part of Nelvana's distribution package for the series. Guest stars: James Arnold Taylor as Sprig Speevak, Nika Futterman as Ani, Justin Berfield as Ving, Michael Clarke Duncan as Rockwell, and Queen Latifah as Pam Dromeda.
71	12	"Mooooving Day"	Gary Conrad	Story by : Jack Thomas; Teleplay by : Gene Grillo	Dave Thomas	October 3, 2005 (Note: This episode was first released in Australia on August 26, 2005.)	FOP−243	N/A
71	12	"Big Wanda"	Ken Bruce	Jack Thomas	Butch Hartman	October 3, 2005	FOP−244	N/A
Timmy wishes that his mother could sell houses, and soon enough, she has sold everyone's houses, including the Turners' themselves, moving them into luxurious Dimmadome Acres. Everything seems well until Timmy notices that everyone who has been drinking this milk has suddenly been put into a trance-like state, including Cosmo and Wanda. Someone has kidnapped Big Daddy, leaving Wanda to run the family business. Her first task is a mafia makeover, complete with pink trash removal uniforms, pink garbage trucks, and doilies on all of the Fairy World trash cans. Meanwhile, Timmy and Cosmo search frantically for Big Daddy. Guest star: Tony Sirico as Big Daddy
72	13	"Oh, Brother!"	Gary Conrad	Story by : Kevin Sullivan & Deirdre Brenner; Teleplay by : Kevin Sullivan	Steve Daye	October 4, 2005 (Note: This episode was first released in Australia on September 9, 2005.)	FOP−248	N/A
72	13	"What's the Difference?"	Ken Bruce	Jack Thomas	Maureen Mascarina	October 4, 2005	FOP−245	N/A
Tired of having nobody to protect him from Francis and give him rides to school, Timmy wishes for an older brother, thus creating Tommy Turner, an eighteen-year-old brother who is perfect. It turns out, however, that he is a bit too perfect. Guest star: Jason Bateman as Tommy Turner Mark seeks Timmy's help after his fake-i-fier malfunctions and his evil fiancée Princess Mandie tracks him down to Dimmsdale Elementary School. To hide Mark, Timmy wishes the school into a spot-the-hidden-object puzzle book, which causes Cosmo and Wanda to lose their wands in the puzzle. As Mandie will turn Dimmsdale into a crater if she does not find Mark, Timmy must find the wands and wish everything back to normal.
73	14	"Smart Attack!"	Ken Bruce	Greg Fideler	Dave Thomas	October 5, 2005 (Note: This episode was first released in Australia on September 16, 2005.)	FOP−246	N/A
73	14	"Operation F.U.N."	Gary Conrad	Cynthia True	Dave Cunningham	October 5, 2005	FOP−247	N/A
Dad attempts helping Timmy with his homework, but he keeps doing more harm than good. To fix this, Timmy wishes that his father was the smartest dad in the town. However, Timmy's father's greater attention to detail leads him to questioning Timmy's talking goldfish. After Remy Buxaplenty visits and tells them about F.U.N. Academy, Timmy wishes for scholarships for him and his friends. But no sooner does Timmy learn than his parents drop him off that he has been tricked by Remy once again, and F.U.N. Academy really stands for "For Unruly N'er-do-wells", a military school for troublemakers.
74	15	"Something's Fishy!"	Gary Conrad	Steve Marmel & Jack Thomas	Brandon Kruse	October 6, 2005 (Note: This episode was first released in Australia on September 23, 2005.)	FOP−254	N/A
74	15	"Presto Change-O"	Ken Bruce	Story by : Deirdre Brenner & Kevin Sullivan; Teleplay by : Kevin Sullivan	Maureen Mascarina	October 6, 2005	FOP−252	N/A
Timmy, bored at the beach, sets off with Cosmo and Wanda to explore the deep. Everywhere they go, Cosmo seems to be hated by every single fish. Soon, they end up in the lost city of Atlantis where Cosmo is taken captive when it is revealed that he had sunk the city 9 times. Timmy appeals to Atlantis' leader, King Greg – if he can show good cause why Atlanteans should be happy beneath the sea, Cosmo will be set free. Timmy wishes for a joy-buzzer that allows him to swap bodies with whoever he touches. Meanwhile, Cosmo and Wanda care for Cosmo's sick mother, who's so delirious from illness that she actually likes Wanda.
75	16	"The Good Old Days!"	Gary Conrad	Story by : Dave Thomas & Steve Marmel; Teleplay by : Dave Thomas	Dave Thomas	October 7, 2005	FOP−251	N/A
75	16	"Future Lost"	Ken Bruce	Jack Thomas	Dave Cunningham & Butch Hartman	October 7, 2005	FOP−253	N/A
While trying to bond with his grandfather, Pappy (who hasn't babysat him since Timmy was a baby, and whose senility is why Timmy has horrible buck teeth), Pappy gets Timmy interested in the "gratuitous-yet-non-imitatable" violent cartoons of his youth (a Popeye spoof called Poke-Eye: The Longshoreman), but when the TV breaks, Cosmo and Wanda send Timmy and Pappy into the fun, yet dangerous world of a 1930s cartoon. After finding an old sci-fi book in the attic, Timmy wishes that the world was futuristic as what's in the book.
76	17	"The Jimmy Timmy Power Hour 2: When Nerds Collide!"	Keith Alcorn, Mike Gasaway & Butch Hartman	Story by : Gene Grillo, Steve Marmel, Jed Spingarn & Jack Thomas; Teleplay by : Gene Grillo & Steve Marmel	Jason Dorf, Rod Douglas & Dan Nosella (3D segments); Maureen Mascarina, Steve Daye & Butch Hartman (2D segments)	January 16, 2006	FOP−249	5.48 4.09 (HH)
76	17	"The Jimmy Timmy Power Hour 2: When Nerds Collide!"	Keith Alcorn, Mike Gasaway & Butch Hartman	Story by : Gene Grillo, Steve Marmel, Jed Spingarn & Jack Thomas; Teleplay by : Gene Grillo & Steve Marmel	Jason Dorf, Rod Douglas & Dan Nosella (3D segments); Maureen Mascarina, Steve Daye & Butch Hartman (2D segments)	January 16, 2006	FOP−250	5.48 4.09 (HH)
Timmy and Jimmy's second crossover adventure has him and Jimmy fight with each other to see who gets to take Cindy to a Friday the 13th dance while battling Anti-Cosmo and Prof. Finbarr Calamitous. Guest star: Tim Curry as Professor Calamitous
77	18	"Timmy the Barbarian!"	Ken Bruce	Story by : Dave Thomas; Teleplay by : Jack Thomas & Steve Marmel	Dave Thomas	November 25, 2006 (Note: This episode was first released in Australia on December 9, 2005.)	FOP−257	N/A
77	18	"No Substitute for Crazy!"	Gary Conrad	Kevin Sullivan	Dave Cunningham & Butch Hartman	November 25, 2006	FOP−258	N/A
Jorgen reads Binky a bedtime story that unwillingly involves Timmy, Cosmo, and Wanda. When Mr. Crocker falls off the classroom, Timmy wishes he had a new permanent teacher named Mrs. Sunshine, but she turns out to be an evil fairy-hunter as Mrs. Doombringer. Timmy must protect his fairies from the evil teacher and get Mr. Crocker back. Guest star: Carolyn Lawrence as Mrs. Sunshine
78	19	"Fairy Idol"	Ken Bruce & Gary Conrad	Story by : Steve Marmel, Dave Thomas & Kevin Sullivan; Teleplay by : Butch Hartman & Steve Marmel	Steve Daye, Maureen Mascarina, Dave Thomas & Butch Hartman	May 19, 2006	FOP−259 FOP−260	5.03 3.53 (HH)
79	20	"Fairy Idol"	Ken Bruce & Gary Conrad	Story by : Steve Marmel, Dave Thomas & Kevin Sullivan; Teleplay by : Butch Hartman & Steve Marmel	Steve Daye, Maureen Mascarina, Dave Thomas & Butch Hartman	May 19, 2006	FOP−261 FOP−262	5.03 3.53 (HH)
Norm creates a clone of Timmy, who abuses and wears out Cosmo and Wanda, causing them to quit their job as his fairy godparents. In Fairy World, a reality show, called Fairy Idol, is held to determine their replacement. Timmy now must attempt to make sure Norm cannot win his freedom from being a genie and become an even more crafty fairy godfather instead. Guest stars: Diana DeGarmo as Cosmo's singing voice and Ben Stein as H.P. and Sanderson
80	21	"The Jimmy Timmy Power Hour 3: The Jerkinators!"	Keith Alcorn, Mike Gasaway & Butch Hartman	Steve Marmel & Jed Spingarn	Jason Dorf, Rod Douglas & Dan Nosella (3D segments); Dave Cunningham, Steve Daye, Maureen Mascarina, Dave Thomas & Butch Hartman (2D segments)	July 21, 2006	FOP−255	3.7
80	21	"The Jimmy Timmy Power Hour 3: The Jerkinators!"	Keith Alcorn, Mike Gasaway & Butch Hartman	Steve Marmel & Jed Spingarn	Jason Dorf, Rod Douglas & Dan Nosella (3D segments); Dave Cunningham, Steve Daye, Maureen Mascarina, Dave Thomas & Butch Hartman (2D segments)	July 21, 2006	FOP−256	3.7
Timmy and Jimmy create their own villain to fight to kill their boredom, but then things go wrong when the villain takes all the citizens of Dimmsdale and Retroville to a new 2.5D world, and strips Jimmy of his brains and Cosmo and Wanda of their magic. Guest stars: Jeff Garlin as Shirley and Jay Leno as the Nega-Chin

== DVD releases ==
Season	Episodes	Release dates
Season	Episodes	Region 1
5	21	Scary GodParents: August 30, 2005; Episodes: 64a ("Timmy's 2-D House of Horror") Jimmy Timmy Power Hour 2: March 14, 2006; Episodes: 76 ("Jimmy Timmy Power Hour 2: When Nerds Collide") Fairy Idol: May 23, 2006; Episodes: 78 / 79 ("Fairy Idol") Jimmy Timmy Power Hour 3: July 25, 2006; Episodes: 80 ("Jimmy Timmy Power Hour 3: The Jerkinators") Season 5: June 3, 2011; Episodes: Entire season included The Complete Series: December 10, 2024; Episodes: Entire season included
