= The Fairly OddParents season 3 =

The Fairly OddParents
- Season 3
- DVD cover
- Showrunner: Butch Hartman
- No. of episodes: 19 (33 segments)

Release
- Original network: Nickelodeon
- Original release: November 8, 2002 – November 21, 2003

Season chronology
- ← Previous; Season 2 Next → Season 4

The third season of The Fairly OddParents premiered on November 8, 2002 and ended on November 21, 2003.

== Production ==
Episodes from this season were written throughout 2002.

== Episodes ==
No. overall	No. in season	Title	Directed by	Written by	Storyboard by	Original release date	Prod. code	Viewers (millions)
21	1	"Ruled Out"	Gary Conrad	Karin Gutman	Dave Thomas	November 8, 2002	FOP−142	3.15
21	1	"That's Life!"	Sarah Frost & Butch Hartman	Spencer Green, Butch Hartman & Steve Marmel	Butch Hartman & Jim Schumann	November 8, 2002	FOP−141	3.15
Timmy, tired of his parents' strict rules, wishes for parents that cared less. However, when his mom and dad (and his Fairy Godparents) start acting lazy and neglectful, Timmy finds out why being responsible is important. To help his Mom win the Dimmsdale "veg-off", Timmy wishes her garden full of life. He does not remember that his dearly departed pet gerbil, Eddie, is buried in the garden, and wreaks havoc in Dimmsdale after being brought to life.
22	2	"Shiny Teeth"	Butch Hartman	Butch Hartman & Steve Marmel	Heather Martinez & Butch Hartman	November 30, 2002	FOP−155	2.32
22	2	"Odd, Odd West"	John Fountain & Butch Hartman	Steve Marmel & Jack Thomas	Jim Schumann & John Fountain	November 30, 2002	FOP−143	2.32
Before his upcoming music video "My Shiny Teeth and Me", evil dentist Dr. Bender rips out Chip Skylark's teeth, which stops him from singing. Timmy must now contact the Tooth Fairy to seek aid in recovering Chip's teeth, and succeeds. Guest stars: Chris Kirkpatrick as Chip Skylark and Skip Sparkypants and Gilbert Gottfried as Dr. Bender and Wendell Bender Timmy wishes he was in the Old West and he, along with old-timey versions of his friends, must face bandit Vicky.
23	3	"MicroPhony"	Gary Conrad	Butch Hartman, Steve Marmel & Jack Thomas	Dave Thomas	August 1, 2003 (Note: This episode was first released in Canada on March 19, 2003.)	FOP−145	2.86
23	3	"So Totally Spaced Out"	Sarah Frost & Butch Hartman	Steve Marmel & Jack Thomas	Chris Robertson	August 1, 2003	FOP−144	2.86
During the summer, Vicky uses the radio to promote her babysitting service and make kids work all day. Timmy fights back with a magic microphone that makes his voice sound cool. Set during the episodes "Totally Spaced Out" and "Spaced Out", Mark Chang comes to earth and tells Timmy that his planet has been invaded by a cute alien race known as the Gigglepies. Since the Yugopotamians are afraid of anything nice and sweet, they are powerless against them. Timmy departs to fight the menace.
24	4	"Love Struck!"	Sarah Frost, Gary Conrad & Butch Hartman	Scott Fellows, Steve Marmel & Butch Hartman	Dave Thomas, Chris Robertson, Heather Martinez, Shawn Murray & Butch Hartman	February 14, 2003 (Note: This episode was first released in Canada on February 12, 2003.)	FOP−153	3.99 2.41 (HH) (Note: (HH) indicates the amount of households an episode was viewed in when it premiered.)
24	4	"Love Struck!"	Sarah Frost, Gary Conrad & Butch Hartman	Scott Fellows, Steve Marmel & Butch Hartman	Dave Thomas, Chris Robertson, Heather Martinez, Shawn Murray & Butch Hartman	February 14, 2003	FOP−154	3.99 2.41 (HH)
Having been rejected by Trixie on Valentine's Day, Timmy wishes that the population be divided by gender, thus Dimmsdale (and, to a greater extent, the world) splits into Hersdale and Himsdale by a wall. Unfortunately, because no love is spreading, Cupid is nearing his death, so Timmy must save him.
25	5	"Cosmo Con"	Wincat Alcala & Butch Hartman	Scott Fellows & Jack Thomas	Wincat Alcala	January 10, 2003	FOP−156	2.66
25	5	"Wanda's Day Off!"	Sarah Frost & Butch Hartman	Jack Thomas	Heather Martinez & Shawn Murray	January 10, 2003	FOP−158	2.66
Cosmo has a chance to gain popularity when he is chosen to host a Fairy Convention, but the convention turns out to be in Timmy's bathroom while Crocker pays a visit. Wanda takes a day off while Cosmo and Timmy promise to spend the day without using any wishes, but one wish ruins the entire plan.
26	6	"Odd Jobs"	Gary Conrad	Scott Fellows	Dave Thomas & Chris Robertson	January 27, 2003	FOP−159	3.04
26	6	"Movie Magic"	Wincat Alcala & Butch Hartman	Scott Fellows & Jack Thomas	Ian Graham	January 27, 2003	FOP−146	3.04
Cosmo and Wanda create a magical website that gives Dad new jobs, but Timmy soon realizes that popularity is not necessary to be loved. Timmy attempts to create the perfect movie in order to win the Dimmy award and impress Trixie. Although he does win the award, it does not actually win his interest's heart.
27	7	"Abra-Catastrophe!"	Butch Hartman	Butch Hartman & Steve Marmel	John Fountain, Ian Graham, Heather Martinez, Shawn Murray, Chris Robertson, Dave Thomas & Butch Hartman	July 12, 2003	FOP−147 FOP−148	4.49 2.97 (HH)
28	8	"Abra-Catastrophe!"	Butch Hartman	Butch Hartman & Steve Marmel	John Fountain, Ian Graham, Heather Martinez, Shawn Murray, Chris Robertson, Dave Thomas & Butch Hartman	July 12, 2003	FOP−149 FOP−150	4.49 2.97 (HH)
29	9	"Abra-Catastrophe!"	Butch Hartman	Butch Hartman & Steve Marmel	John Fountain, Ian Graham, Heather Martinez, Shawn Murray, Chris Robertson, Dave Thomas & Butch Hartman	July 12, 2003	FOP−151 FOP−152	4.49 2.97 (HH)
Timmy Turner has kept his fairy godparents Cosmo and Wanda a secret for one whole year thus far. He receives a special gift, the "Fairy-versary muffin", which can grant any user one rule-free wish. With Timmy's school teacher Mr. Crocker constantly spying on him to prove that fairies indeed exist, the Fairy-versary muffin falls into other people's hands, including Bippy, who transforms the world into a jungle, ruled by apes. As luck would have it, the magic muffin eventually ended up at the hands of Mr. Crocker. Using the muffin, Mr. Crocker captures Wanda and wishes for an oppressive world ruled by him, transforming Dimmsdale into Slavesdale. Now, Timmy must get the muffin back and save Wanda and the whole world. Guest stars: Robert Costanzo as the Easter Bunny, Ape Construction Worker and Ape Truck Driver and Gray De Mel as Fairy Cowlick Jr.
30	10	"Sleepover and Over"	Ken Bruce & Butch Hartman	Scott Fellows, Steve Marmel & Jack Thomas	Heather Martinez and Shawn Murray	May 17, 2003	FOP−157	3.00
30	10	"Mother Nature"	Gary Conrad	Scott Fellows & Jack Thomas	Dave Thomas & Chris Robertson	May 17, 2003	FOP−163	3.00
When Timmy, Chester, and A.J. are meant to have a sleepover together, arguments between the latter two split the friends apart. Timmy has to go to both sleepovers at the same time, planning to get his friends to put aside their differences. In Dimmsdale, if the weather person gets the weather wrong, they get run out of town by an angry mob. Timmy's Mom becomes the new weather person after Timmy and his dad constantly ignore her. Fearing that she will get the weather wrong and thus ran out of town, Timmy wishes his mom's weather predictions would always come true.
31	11	"The Crimson Chin Meets Mighty Mom & Dyno Dad!" "Mighty Mom & Dyno Dad Meet Crimson Chin"	Ken Bruce & Butch Hartman	Butch Hartman & Steve Marmel	Heather Martinez & Shawn Murray	May 9, 2003	FOP−162	2.72
31	11	"Engine Blocked"	Wincat Alcala & Butch Hartman	Jack Thomas	Ian Graham & Butch Hartman	May 9, 2003	FOP−160	2.72
Timmy accidentally wishes the Nega Chin (the Crimson Chin's ultimate enemy) out of a comic book, but still thinks he is the Crimson Chin. He hides him in his treehouse, and has Cosmo and Wanda grant his wishes. Timmy realizes who he is and what the wishes were (all his villain friends out of the comic book; Cosmo and Wanda's magic cannot affect him; he cannot be wished back into the book; and that Timmy cannot wish his room clean as his parents need him to). Now, Timmy must give his parents their super hero powers back to stop them, and has the Crimson Chin help as well. Guest star: Jay Leno as The Crimson Chin and Nega-Chin Wanting to spend time with his father, Timmy wishes that he is his dad's cool new car, the Stryker Z. When Timmy, as the car, is at an auto show and stolen by Vicky, Timmy's father has to save him.
32	12	"Most Wanted Wish"	Gary Conrad	Scott Fellows	Dave Thomas	May 2, 2003	FOP−164	2.83
32	12	"This is Your Wish"	Sarah Frost	Butch Hartman, Steve Marmel, Scott Fellows & Jack Thomas	Heather Martinez & Shawn Murray	May 2, 2003	FOP−166	2.83
Timmy wishes that he was the most wanted child in the world, resulting in all of Dimmsdale's residents — including Trixie — wanting him. He is even wanted by the Federal Bureau of Investigation in the sense that he is a criminal. Every single fairy in the universe wants to be his godparent, forcing Cosmo and Wanda to go up against every fairy in existence in a Texas cage-match to become Timmy's godparents. Mama Cosma forces Cosmo onto a reality TV show in which the audience decides if he should stay with Wanda in Dimmsdale, or with herself in Fairy World. Mama Cosma tries to convince the audience that Cosmo should stay with her, while Timmy argues that he should stay with him and Wanda.
33	13	"Beddy Bye"	Wincat Alcala & Butch Hartman	Story by : Mike Lewis; Teleplay by : Steve Marmel, Jack Thomas & Scott Fellows	Erik Wiese	May 23, 2003	FOP−165	2.89 2.03 (HH)
33	13	"The Grass is Greener"	Ken Bruce & Butch Hartman	Steve Marmel, Jack Thomas & Spencer Green	Ian Graham & Butch Hartman	May 23, 2003	FOP−161	2.89 2.03 (HH)
Being annoyed by his inability to stay up all night and thus missing night-time events, Timmy wishes that nobody would need to sleep. The people of Dimmsdale grow increasingly tired without being able to sleep. Guest star: Jackie Mason as the Sandman Feeling unloved by his parents, Timmy runs away to join a carnival. He becomes a carny and impresses some kids with his tricks, but when he runs afoul of a group of professional carnies, he must make it back home safely, seemingly without help from his fairies.
34	14	"The Secret Origin of Denzel Crocker!"	Gary Conrad, Sarah Frost & Wincat Alcala	Butch Hartman & Steve Marmel	Dave Thomas, Ian Graham, Heather Martinez & Shawn Murray	June 27, 2003	FOP−167	3.08
34	14	"The Secret Origin of Denzel Crocker!"	Gary Conrad, Sarah Frost & Wincat Alcala	Butch Hartman & Steve Marmel	Dave Thomas, Ian Graham, Heather Martinez & Shawn Murray	June 27, 2003	FOP−168	3.08
March 15 is the day that every child fears: Denzel Crocker Day, the day that he is at his meanest. Timmy uses the Time Scooter to go back to Crocker's childhood and tries to prevent what made him so miserable. While there, he learns that Cosmo and Wanda used to be Crocker's godparents, and losing them is what caused him to obsess over proving the existence of fairies.
35	15	"Kung Timmy"	Wincat Alcala & Gary Conrad	Jack Thomas & Scott Fellows	Heather Martinez & Shawn Murray	November 11, 2003 (Note: This episode was first released in Canada on November 4, 2003.)	FOP−170	3.02
35	15	"Which Witch is Which?"	Sarah Frost & Ken Bruce	Butch Hartman & Jack Thomas	Butch Hartman	November 11, 2003	FOP−169	3.02
Timmy learns kung-fu to defeat Francis, defend Tootie from him, and save his family's house. Guest star: Billy Blanks as himself Timmy battles a witch hunter in the past--who turns out to be a witch himself--while seeking to learn the truth about Dimmsdale's origins.
36	16	"Pipe Down!"	Sarah Frost	Butch Hartman, Steve Marmel, Jack Thomas & Scott Fellows	Dave Thomas	September 26, 2003	FOP−171	2.92
36	16	"The Big Scoop!"	Wincat Alcala & Gary Conrad	Butch Hartman & Steve Marmel	Ian Graham & Lane Lueras	September 26, 2003	FOP−172	2.92
When Timmy is shouted at one too many times, he wishes that everyone would just be quiet for one day. Cosmo and Wanda grant this wish, and soon, Dimmsdale is eliminated of dialogue. However, a meteor is soon about to strike the town, and Timmy cannot undo the wish because no one can hear him, but he manages to wish the sound back by charading it. Set during the first season episode "A Wish Too Far!", Chester and A.J. attempt to find a story for the school newspaper, and they decide to write about Timmy and his sudden popularity.
37	17	"Crime Wave"	Wincat Alcala & Butch Hartman	Butch Hartman & Steve Marmel	Heather Martinez & Shawn Murray	October 10, 2003	FOP−176	3.75
37	17	"Odd Ball"	Sarah Frost	Jack Thomas, Scott Fellows & Jim Hecht	Ian Graham	October 10, 2003	FOP−177	3.75
Timmy is taking a bath, but he wants to get the new issue of Crimson Chin. Cosmo and Wanda wish him to the store, but he appears there in the nude and now must get back before anyone sees him. In the meantime, Crimson Chin fights with H_{2}Olga in order to save not only the city, but also a baby he agreed to watch. Timmy leaves his comic book on the side of the tub, increasing H_{2}Olga's power as it slowly dips into the water. Guest star: Jay Leno as the Crimson Chin Timmy needs money to buy a new video game console, and becomes the new player of Dimmsdale's basketball team, the Ballhogs, the most selfish team in the league. If they lose one more game, they will get shipped off to the Alaskan basketball league. Timmy must now help them win, keeping in mind that he cannot wish to win a competition. Guest star: Rick Fox as Flash Williams and Smooth Daley
38	18	"Where's Wanda?"	Gary Conrad	Jack Thomas	Heather Martinez & Shawn Murray	October 18, 2003	FOP−179	3.55 2.72 (HH)
38	18	"Imaginary Gary"	Gary Conrad	Steve Marmel & Butch Hartman	Heather Martinez & Shawn Murray	October 18, 2003	FOP−180	3.55 2.72 (HH)
Timmy solves the mystery of Wanda's disappearance in a black-and-white film-noir setting. He must solve it before a secret fairy probation hearing. When Timmy wishes that his imaginary friend Gary was real, Gary is instantly favored by Timmy's friends, family, and even Trixie. Later, however, it turns out that Gary wants revenge for Timmy abandoning him for real friends. Timmy cannot wish him away because Gary is from his imagination, and thus is a part of him, allowing Gary to make wishes too.
39	19	"Chip Off the Old Chip"	Wincat Alcala & Butch Hartman	Butch Hartman, Steve Marmel & Jack Thomas	Dave Thomas & Butch Hartman	November 21, 2003	FOP−175	3.09
39	19	"Snow Bound"	Sarah Frost	Scott Fellows	Ian Graham & Rayfield Angrum	November 21, 2003	FOP−178	3.09
To win the male lead in the school musical and play opposite Trixie Tang, Timmy wishes for Chip Skylark's voice. However, while Timmy has Chip's voice, Chip now has Timmy's voice, and Chip's singing career quickly plummets. Timmy tries to wish everything back to normal, but Cosmo and Wanda can only grant a wish made in their godchild's voice. Guest star: Chris Kirkpatrick as Chip Skylark Timmy's dad forces Timmy to go with him to check up on his mom, who is at a ski resort. Vicky goes along with them, and while snowboarding, Timmy and Vicky get trapped in a cave after an avalanche. Timmy cannot wish himself out because Cosmo and Wanda, as goldfish in their fishbowl, are frozen, needing Vicky's help to escape.

== DVD releases ==
Season	Episodes	Release dates		
Season	Episodes	Region 1	Region 2	Region 4
3	17	Abra-Catastrophe!: July 15, 2003; Episodes: 27-29 ("Abra-Catastrophe!") Superhero Spectacle: February 3, 2004; Episodes: 23b ("So Totally Spaced Out"), 31a ("The Crimson Chin Meets Mighty Mom and Dyno Dad"), and 37b ("Crime Wave") Channel Chasers: October 5, 2004; Episodes: 26b ("This Is Your Wish") and 32a ("Microphony") Timmy's Top Wishes: January 18, 2005; Episodes: 36a ("Pipe Down"), 38a ("Where's Wanda?") and 39a ("Chip Off The Old Chip") School's Out: The Musical: June 14, 2005; Episodes: 32a ("Most Wanted Wish") Scary GodParents: August 30, 2005; Episodes: 35b ("Which Witch Is Which?") Jimmy Timmy Power Hour 2: March 14, 2006; Episodes: 32a ("Most Wanted Wish") Nick Picks Vol. 4: June 6, 2006; Episodes: 38 ("Where's Wanda?" / "Imaginary Gary") Season 3: May 16, 2011; Episodes: Entire Season included The Complete Series: December 10, 2024; Episodes: Entire Season included	Microphony: June 16, 2008; Episodes: 23 ("MicroPhony" / "So Totally Spaced Out"), 24 ("Love Struck!"), and 26 ("Odd Jobs" / "Movie Magic")	Wish Five: Wish Six: May 10, 2005; Episodes: 23 ("MicroPhony" / "So Totally Spaced Out"), 24 ("Love Struck!"), and 26 ("Odd Jobs" / "Movie Magic")
