= The Fairly OddParents season 2 =

The Fairly OddParents
- Season 2
- DVD cover
- Showrunner: Butch Hartman
- No. of episodes: 13 (24 segments)

Release
- Original network: Nickelodeon
- Original release: March 1, 2002 – January 20, 2003

Season chronology
- ← Previous; Season 1 Next → Season 3

The second season of The Fairly OddParents premiered on March 1, 2002 and ended on January 20, 2003.

== Production ==
Writing for this season began in October 2000, and concluded in December 2001.

== Episodes ==
No. overall	No. in season	Title	Directed by	Written by	Storyboard by	Original release date	Prod. code	Viewers (millions)
8	1	"Boys in the Band"	Butch Hartman	Butch Hartman & Steve Marmel	Butch Hartman & Paul McEvoy	March 1, 2002	FOP−118	3.15
8	1	"Hex Games"	Butch Hartman	Tim O'Rourke	Bob Boyle	March 1, 2002	FOP−113	3.15
Timmy grows jealous of Dimmsdale's teen-singing sensation, Chip Skylark, for holding a concert on his birthday. Out of anger, Timmy plans to hold him hostage at his house; surprisingly, Vicky falls in love with Chip. Guest star: Chris Kirkpatrick as Chip Skylark Vicky, one of the best skaters at the skate park, is challenged by Timmy; if she wins, the skate park will have height limits on skateboarding, but if Timmy wins, the skate park will be open to all children.
9	2	"Boy Toy"	Butch Hartman	Butch Hartman & Steve Marmel	Butch Hartman & Jim Schumann	March 8, 2002	FOP−116	3.35
9	2	"Inspection Detection"	Butch Hartman	Story by : Butch Hartman & Steve Marmel; Teleplay by : Spencer Green	Butch Hartman	March 8, 2002	FOP−117	3.35
After Timmy wishes himself toy-sized to spend time with his old Crimson Chin action figure, Vicky's sister, Tootie, takes Cosmo and Wanda (disguised as dolls), and Timmy must go to Vicky and Tootie's house to find them. Guest star: Jay Leno as The Crimson Chin Because Timmy has been wishing for things that were (coincidentally) stolen, Timmy is accused of shoplifting. Jorgen Von Strangle then comes for an inspection of Cosmo and Wanda, and if they fail, they will be taken away from Timmy. Meanwhile, Timmy is determined to catch the real shoplifter, Francis.
10	3	"Action Packed"	John Fountain & Butch Hartman	Tracy Berna & Steve Marmel	John Fountain	March 22, 2002	FOP−115	3.14
10	3	"Smarty Pants"	John Fountain & Butch Hartman	Tracy Berna	John Fountain	March 22, 2002	FOP−120	3.14
After watching an action-packed mystery movie, Timmy wishes for an action-packed life. However, it turns into terror when supervillain Jorgen captures Cosmo, Wanda, and all of the other fairies, and drains their magic out of them ("PG-13 horror" as Timmy calls it, is shown for this part). Timmy must stop Jorgen before he becomes the mightiest fairy in the universe. Timmy wishes he was the smartest kid in the world, but the situation becomes complicated when he is placed in a competition with A.J. and subsequently loses his intellect, since, according to "Da Rules", fairy magic can't be used by humans to win competitions.
11	4	"Super Bike"	Butch Hartman	Jack Thomas	Butch Hartman	May 10, 2002	FOP−121	2.84
11	4	"A Mile in My Shoes"	Gary Conrad & Butch Hartman	Tim O'Rourke, Butch Hartman & Steve Marmel	Chris Robertson	May 10, 2002	FOP−123	2.84
Timmy wishes up an indestructible bicycle, but the bike subsequently refuses to allow him to leave it. Timmy has a rough day without his godparents by missing the bus to school, getting soaked in rain, and hit by volleyballs in gym class. Being jealous at his godparents for their supposedly wonderful lifestyle, Timmy becomes a fairy godparent while Cosmo and Wanda become ordinary children. However, Timmy finds out that being a godparent takes more responsibility. Guest star: Carlos Alazraqui as a vampire / a sasquatch / a cow fairy
12	5	"Timvisible"	Butch Hartman	Butch Hartman & Steve Marmel	Butch Hartman & Paul McEvoy	April 26, 2002	FOP−114	2.66
12	5	"That Old Black Magic"	Sarah Frost & Butch Hartman	Butch Hartman & Steve Marmel	Jim Schumann, Butch Hartman & Sarah Frost	April 26, 2002	FOP−126	2.66
On the last day of school, Timmy is getting the perfect attendance award, but Francis is celebrating the last day by beating up all the boys. In order to avoid getting beat up by Francis, Timmy wishes he was invisible, but then has so much fun being invisible that he forgets about the awards ceremony. Now, he must rush to get his award, and avoid Mr. Crocker in the process, as he is trying to capture him because he could use him as proof that fairies exist. On Friday the 13th, Anti-Fairies cause trouble while the Turners spend the day at Adrenaland (a theme park filled with dangerous rides with a mascot known as Phen-Phen Phil).
13	6	"Totally Spaced Out"	John Fountain & Butch Hartman	Steve Marmel & Jack Thomas	John Fountain & Paul McEvoy	July 12, 2002	FOP−128	2.12
13	6	"The Switch Glitch"	Gary Conrad & Butch Hartman	Story by : Jenny Nissenson; Teleplay by : Butch Hartman, Steve Marmel & Jenny Nissenson	Jim Schumann, Gary Conrad & Butch Hartman	July 12, 2002	FOP−122	2.12
Timmy is annoyed when Vicky has to come over, so he wishes she could end up millions of miles away. To accomplish this, Cosmo goes to Yugopotamia, where Mark celebrates his birthday. Cosmo tricks Mark into coming to Earth for Vicky, and she is taken away. But when Timmy's parents have a Plan B for babysitting Timmy, which involves Happy Peppy Gary and Betty and Flappy Bob's Peppy Happy Learnatorium, Timmy realizes he needs Vicky back, and challenges Mark to Death Combat in order to get her. After Timmy's parents break a promise and leave him with Vicky, only for her to torment him again, Timmy wishes that he was the babysitter and Vicky was the child in order to get revenge, but his harsh treatment of Vicky results in Cosmo and Wanda being transferred to Vicky, who uses them to get revenge on Timmy and Timmy turn Vicky normal.
14	7	"Foul Balled"	John Fountain & Butch Hartman	Butch Hartman & Steve Marmel (Note: In "The Boy Who Would Be Queen", the two are credited in the opposite order.)	Chris Robertson & John Fountain	June 7, 2002	FOP−127	2.69 2.33 (HH) (Note: (HH) indicates the amount of households an episode was viewed in when it premiered.)
14	7	"The Boy Who Would Be Queen"	Sarah Frost & Butch Hartman	Butch Hartman & Steve Marmel	Butch Hartman & Sarah Frost	June 7, 2002	FOP−119	2.69 2.33 (HH)
Timmy, tired of losing every game because of Chester, wishes that Chester would become a skilled baseball player, but Chester gets on Timmy's nerves when he starts hogging every position and shunning the rest of his team. Timmy accidentally wishes himself into a girl before Trixie's birthday party, and she uses her new feminine mind to get the perfect gift for her. However, it turns out that Trixie likes boy stuff too.
15	8	"Mighty Mom & Dyno Dad"	John Fountain & Butch Hartman	Butch Hartman & Steve Marmel	John Fountain & Chris Robertson	September 6, 2002	FOP−131	3.87 2.41 (HH)
15	8	"Knighty Knight"	Sarah Frost & Butch Hartman	Butch Hartman, Steve Marmel & Jack Thomas	Butch Hartman, Sarah Frost & Heather Martinez	September 6, 2002	FOP−134	3.87 2.41 (HH)
Timmy, tired of his parents rushing to work and coming home late and tired, thus never having any time for him, wishes his parents had superpowers, but they are too busy saving the world to even spend time with him. Timmy must now become the ultimate villain (a parody of Galactus) to get his parents to give up their superpowers (his wish made them powerful enough that not even magic would affect them, so they must willingly give up their powers). After being disappointed by the Camelot Fair (the knight is shorter than he looks, the Magician is a cleaning product salesmen, and the Dragon is only a dog wearing a dragon mask that even it is afraid of), Timmy wishes that he was in the real Camelot, but Timmy's parents somehow come along with him and are about to be eaten by a dragon.
16	9	"Fairy Fairy Quite Contrary"	John Fountain & Butch Hartman	Jack Thomas, Butch Hartman & Steve Marmel	John Fountain & Jim Schumann	September 13, 2002	FOP−132	3.97 2.66 (HH)
16	9	"Nectar of the Odds"	Sarah Frost & Butch Hartman	Jack Thomas	Sarah Frost & Butch Hartman	September 13, 2002	FOP−135	3.97 2.66 (HH)
Timmy becomes suspicious of a rich boy named Remy Buxaplenty when he notices that he is better than him in many situations, even having the ability to be in the Crimson Chin Comic Book. He discovers that Remy has a Fairy Godparent. Wanda knows who it is, but when she refuses to Timmy, he wishes for her to tell him. Remy's fairy turns out to be Juandissimo Magnifico, Wanda's ex-boyfriend. Remy discovers Timmy's fairies, and to make sure that Timmy does not wish he had more money than him (although Da Rules say that a godchild cannot wish for money), he challenges Timmy to a Magical Duel, where the loser loses his fairies and forgets he ever had them. Timmy tries selling lemonade to see Crash Nebula on Ice, but his lemonade tastes horrible. Timmy discovers that Cosmo's sweat makes the lemonade taste better, and adds it as his secret ingredient. His lemonade is now a success, but with an unfortunate side-effect: it grants the wishes of the people who drink it.
17	10	"Hail to the Chief"	Gary Conrad & Butch Hartman	Steven Banks, Jack Thomas & Steve Marmel	Gary Conrad & Butch Hartman	September 27, 2002	FOP−130	2.98
17	10	"Twistory"	Gary Conrad & Butch Hartman	Butch Hartman, Steve Marmel & Jack Thomas	Paul McEvoy & Butch Hartman	September 27, 2002	FOP−136	2.98
Tired of Tad and Chad abusing their privileges as student body co-Presidents, Timmy campaigns against them and wins. All is not easy being student body President, however. His bodyguards (Chester and A.J.) constantly keep him away from Trixie and follow him everywhere, even into a bathroom stall. Timmy wishes the great American leaders into his house to finish his report, but because they have vanished from history, the United States reverts to being British colonies. To make things worse, Timmy is unable to wish them back, because Cosmo and Wanda's wands are taken for taxes (Taxation Without Representation). Timmy must now use his Time-Scooter to get them back to their own time period to stop Benedict Arnold from creating the alternate future. Note: This episode (along with its sister episode) was withdrew from reruns on the main Nickelodeon Channel after November 2005 due to the episode's negative portrayal of the Founding Founders.
18	11	"Fool's Day Out"	Gary Conrad & Butch Hartman	Jack Thomas, Butch Hartman & Steve Marmel	Chris Robertson & Gary Conrad	October 11, 2002	FOP−133	2.23 (HH)
18	11	"Deja Vu"	Butch Hartman	Story by : Tracy Berna; Teleplay by : Butch Hartman & Steve Marmel	Butch Hartman	October 11, 2002	FOP−129	2.23 (HH)
Fed up of being pranked by everyone (his parents, Cosmo and Wanda, his friends, and the rest of the citizens of Dimmsdale), Timmy summons the April Fool, the ultimate prankster, but Timmy does not know that once the April Fool starts, he does not know when to stop. Now, Timmy and his fairies have to stop him. Annoyed with always being late and receiving poor grades, Timmy wishes for a watch that allows him to redo moments in time, but Vicky steals it and it leads to timeline-altering insanity.
19	12	"Information Stupor Highway"	Sarah Frost, John Fountain & Butch Hartman	Butch Hartman & Steve Marmel	Butch Hartman, Jim Schumann, Chris Robertson & John Fountain	January 20, 2003	FOP−137	4.28 2.86 (HH)
19	12	"Information Stupor Highway"	Sarah Frost, John Fountain & Butch Hartman	Butch Hartman & Steve Marmel	Butch Hartman, Jim Schumann, Chris Robertson & John Fountain	January 20, 2003	FOP−138	4.28 2.86 (HH)
Timmy hopes to ask Trixie Tang to the school dance, deciding to do so via e-mail. When his parents rewrite the e-mail and send it, Timmy wishes to venture through cyberspace to retrieve the e-mail back before it reaches Trixie's computer. While exploring the Internet, Timmy winds up in Mr. Crocker's computer, who sends a virus to Timmy's computer as a way to spy on Cosmo and Wanda.
20	13	"Scary Godparents"	John Fountain, Gary Conrad & Butch Hartman	Butch Hartman, Steve Marmel & Jack Thomas	Heather Martinez, Chris Robertson, Shawn Murray, Butch Hartman & John Fountain	October 29, 2002	FOP−139	3.29
20	13	"Scary Godparents"	John Fountain, Gary Conrad & Butch Hartman	Butch Hartman, Steve Marmel & Jack Thomas	Heather Martinez, Chris Robertson, Shawn Murray, Butch Hartman & John Fountain	October 29, 2002	FOP−140	3.29
For Halloween, Timmy wants a Jack-O-Bot costume as his Halloween costume, but the only four Jack-O-Bot costumes in existence were won in a contest, which Trixie, Veronica, Tad, and Chad won because they bribed the judges. To make things worse, Vicky is being paid by Timmy's parents to take Timmy and his friends trick-or-treating, and forces him to wear a mummy costume made out of toilet paper. Vicky gets all of the candy, while Timmy and his friends get nothing. Realizing that Vicky is scary and gets more candy because of it, Timmy wishes that everyone's Halloween costumes were real and scary. This causes everyone to become real and scary versions of the costumes they wear, including the popular kids, who turn into the real Jack-O-Bots and threaten to destroy the world. Also, Timmy cannot undo the wish because Cosmo and Wanda were in costume at the time and are now no longer magical. Meanwhile, the Yugopotamians, seeing people celebrate Halloween, think Earth is planning an attack on them and attempt to counter-attack. Guest star: Gilbert Gottfried as Dr. Bender and Wendell Bender

== DVD releases ==
Season	Episodes	Release dates		
Season	Episodes	Region 1	Region 2	Region 4
2	14	Superhero Spectacle: February 3, 2004 (Episodes: "Boy Toy" • "Action Packed" • "Totally Spaced Out" • "Mighty Mom & Dyno Dad"); Jimmy Timmy Power Hour: May 11, 2004 (Episodes: "Timvisible" • "The Switch Glitch"); Timmy's Top Wishes: January 18, 2005 (Episodes: "Boys In The Band" • "Knighty Knight"); Scary GodParents: August 30, 2005 (Episodes: "Scary GodParents"); Nick Picks Vol. 3: February 7, 2006 (Episodes: "Hail to the Chief" / "Twistory"); Jimmy Timmy Power Hour 2: March 14, 2006 (Episodes: "A Mile In My Shoes"); Nick Picks Holiday: September 26, 2006 (Episodes: "Christmas Everyday!"); Season 2: June 2, 2009 (Episodes: Entire season included); The Complete Series: December 10, 2024 (Episodes: Entire season included)	Boys in the Band: September 13, 2004 (Episodes: "Boys In The Band" – "Inspection Detention"); Timvisible: September 5, 2005 (Episodes: "Christmas Every Day" • "Action Packed" – "The Boy Who Would Be Queen"); The Complete First Series: October 17, 2005 (Episodes: "Christmas Every Day" – "The Boy Who Would Be Queen"); Totally Spaced Out: June 6, 2006 (Episodes: "Totally Spaced Out" – "Twistory"); Information Stupor Highway: October 9, 2006 (Episodes: "Fool's Day Out" – "Information Stupor Highway")	Wish Two: September 8, 2004 (Episodes: "Boys In The Band" – "Inspection Detention"); Wish Three: November 9, 2004 (Episodes: "Christmas Every Day" • "Action Packed" – "The Boy Who Would Be Queen"); Wish Four: January 18, 2005 (Episodes: "Totally Spaced Out" – "Twistory"); Wish Five: May 10, 2005 (Episodes: "Fool's Day Out" – "Scary Godparents”)
