= The Fairly OddParents season 1 =

The Fairly OddParents
- Season 1
- DVD cover
- Showrunner: Butch Hartman
- No. of episodes: 7 (13 segments)

Release
- Original network: Nickelodeon
- Original release: March 30 – December 9, 2001

Season chronology
- Next → Season 2

The first season of The Fairly OddParents premiered on March 30, 2001 and ended on May 4, with the final episode titled "Christmas Everyday!" airing later that same year.

== Production ==
Writing for episodes this season began in February 2000, and concluded in July 2000.

== Episodes ==
Clips from The Big Problem, the first episode of Season 1

No. overall	No. in season	Title	Directed by	Written by	Storyboard by	Original release date	Prod. code	Viewers (millions)
1	1	"The Big Problem!"	Butch Hartman & Jaime Diaz	Steve Marmel	Butch Hartman & Bernie Petterson	March 30, 2001	FOP−101	3.59 2.30 (HH) (Note: (HH) indicates the amount of households an episode was viewed in when it premiered.)
1	1	"Power Mad!"	Butch Hartman	Story by : Mike Bell & Steve Marmel; Teleplay by : Steve Marmel	Butch Hartman	March 30, 2001	FOP−104	3.59 2.30 (HH)
Tired of the disadvantages of being a child, Timmy wishes to be a grown-up. Rather than becoming the strapping, muscular, older Timmy of his dreams, he turns into a short, bald, hairy-backed, 45-year-old man. Timmy is sick and tired of his games being too childish, so he wishes for the most challenging video game ever. When Chester and A.J. come over unexpectedly, they end up transporting themselves into the game. Now Timmy must enter the game and survive various levels of difficulty in order to reach his friends, or else Vicky's appliances could cause a power surge and shut down the game forever.
2	2	"Spaced Out"	Butch Hartman	Mike Bell, Butch Hartman & Steve Marmel	Butch Hartman & Barry Bunce	April 6, 2001	FOP−102	2.64
2	2	"TransParents!"	Butch Hartman & Larry Leichliter	Butch Hartman & Steve Marmel	Butch Hartman & Joe Daniello	April 6, 2001	FOP−105	2.64
After watching an episode of Crash Nebula, Timmy and friends want to stage a reenactment, and Timmy wants an authentic alien creature for it. To fulfill this want, Cosmo and Wanda conjure up Mark Chang, prince of the planet Yugopotamia. Mark then captures Chester and A.J. and develops an affection for Vicky. Since magic cannot interfere with true love, Timmy, Cosmo and Wanda blast off to Yugopotamia to find Mark's parents so they can set things straight and bring Mark home. Guest star: Rob Paulsen as Mark Chang Timmy's teacher, Mr. Denzel Crocker, calls for a conference with Timmy's parents for a suspicious show-and-tell project. Not wanting to let his real parents find out, Timmy asks Cosmo and Wanda to pose as his parents. Crocker, who knows that Cosmo and Wanda are fairies, sets up traps for them to prove their existence.
3	3	"Chin Up!"	Butch Hartman	Steve Marmel	Paul McEvoy & Butch Hartman	April 27, 2001	FOP−106	2.17
3	3	"Dog's Day Afternoon"	Butch Hartman & Larry Leichliter	Steve Marmel	Paul McEvoy & Butch Hartman	April 27, 2001	FOP−103	2.17
Timmy meets his favorite superhero, The Crimson Chin, but the discovery that he is fictional sends the hero into a deep depression. Timmy must now reverse this situation, and as a result, he gains the superhero alter-ego of Cleft the Boy Chin Wonder. Guest star: Jay Leno as The Crimson Chin Timmy wishes to switch brains with Vicky's dog Doidle, but swiftly discovers that the dog actually has it just as badly as he does, in that Vicky wants to have him "get fixed".
4	4	"A Wish Too Far!"	Butch Hartman	Steve Marmel	Butch Hartman & Erik Wiese	April 13, 2001	FOP−109	2.93
4	4	"Tiny Timmy!"	Butch Hartman and Larry Leichliter	Story by : Butch Hartman, Mike Bell & Steve Marmel; Teleplay by : Steve Marmel	Paul McEvoy	April 13, 2001	FOP−108	2.93
Timmy wants to get the attention of popular girl Trixie Tang, but she rejects him for not being as popular as her. To get her attention, Timmy wishes for material possessions to make him look popular, but the more stuff he wishes for to become popular, the more rude and ungrateful he becomes towards his godparents. In order to study the human body, Cosmo and Wanda shrink Timmy so that he can explore Vicky's body, but chaos soon ensues.
5	5	"Father Time!"	Butch Hartman & Jaime Diaz	Butch Hartman & Steve Marmel	John Fountain & Butch Hartman	April 20, 2001	FOP−107	2.37
5	5	"Apartnership!"	Butch Hartman	Butch Hartman & Steve Marmel	John Fountain & Butch Hartman	April 20, 2001	FOP−112	2.37
After getting in trouble for melting his father's trophy with heat vision, Timmy wishes for a time-travelling scooter so he can stop Dad from ever winning it. Unfortunately, Timmy's actions have changed the course of history when he returns to the present: Dad rules all of Dimmsdale, and Cosmo and Wanda never met Timmy. Now, Timmy must return to the past to correct the damage he did to the timeline. While celebrating the wedding anniversary of both his parents and godparents, Timmy is forced to travel to Fairy World when Cosmo leaves Wanda due to a misunderstanding.
6	6	"Dream Goat!"	Butch Hartman & Larry Leichliter	Story by : Butch Hartman, Mike Bell & Steve Marmel; Teleplay by : Steve Marmel	John Fountain	May 4, 2001	FOP−110	2.41
6	6	"The Same Game"	Butch Hartman	Butch Hartman & Steve Marmel	Paul McEvoy & Butch Hartman	May 4, 2001	FOP−111	2.41
Feeling that Chompy the Goat needs freedom, Timmy wishes him free. However, when Vicky is spotted near Chompy's pen, she is accused of setting Chompy free and is arrested. However, once guilt catches up to Timmy, he later realizes that he must get Chompy back. Timmy gets bullied for his large buck teeth, so he wishes for everyone to look the same. This turns everyone into gray, unrecognizable blobs. Now, Cosmo and Wanda must find Timmy before they explode and turn into unrecognizable dust. Guest star: Gilbert Gottfried as Dr. Bender and Wendell Bender
7	7	"Christmas Everyday!"	Butch Hartman	Story by : Butch Hartman, Tracy Berna & Steve Marmel; Teleplay by : Butch Hartman & Steve Marmel	Butch Hartman & Bob Boyle	December 9, 2001	FOP−124	2.65
7	7	"Christmas Everyday!"	Butch Hartman	Story by : Butch Hartman, Tracy Berna & Steve Marmel; Teleplay by : Butch Hartman & Steve Marmel	Butch Hartman & Bob Boyle	December 9, 2001	FOP−125 (Note: This episode was originally produced for the second season, and was a part of the season 2 DVD set. However, digital outlets label this episode as part of season 1.)	2.65
Timmy has a wonderful Christmas, so he wishes it was Christmas every day, but then the other holiday spirits become jealous and force Timmy to race to the North Pole in an attempt to save Santa. Guest stars: Tom Arnold as Corporate Santa and Brian Dunkleman as the April Fool

== DVD releases ==
Season	Episodes	Release dates		
Season	Episodes	Region 1	Region 2	Region 4
1	6	Superhero Spectacle: February 3, 2004 (Episodes: "Chin Up!"); Channel Chasers: October 5, 2004 (Episodes: "Spaced Out"); Season 1: June 2, 2009 (Episodes: Entire season included); The Complete Series: December 10, 2024 (Episodes: Entire season included)	The Big Problem: February 23, 2004 (Episodes: "The Big Problem" – "Tiny Timmy" • "Chin Up!" / "Dog's Day Afternoon"); Boys in the Band: September 13, 2004 (Episodes: "Father Time" / "Apartnership" • "Dream Goat" / "The Same Game"); The Complete First Series: October 17, 2005 (Entire season included)	Wish One: September 8, 2004 (Episodes: "The Big Problem" – "Tiny Timmy" • "Chin Up!" / "Dog's Day Afternoon"); Wish Two: September 8, 2004 (Episodes: "Father Time" / "Apartnership" • "Dream Goat" / "The Same Game")
