= Abra-Catastrophe! =

7th, 8th, and 9th episodes of the 3rd season of The Fairly OddParents

- The Fairly OddParents episodes
- Artwork from the DVD release of the film
- Episode nos.: Season 3 Episodes 7-9
- Directed by: Butch Hartman; Art direction: Bob Boyle
- Written by: Butch Hartman; Steve Marmel
- Editing by: Otto Ferrene; Chris Hink
- Production code: FOP-147-152
- Original air date: July 12, 2003
- Running time: 74 minutes

Episode chronology
← Previous "Movie Magic"	Next → "Sleepover and Over"
- The Fairly OddParents season 3

Abra-Catastrophe! is a television film initially released as the seventh, eighth, and ninth episodes of the third season of The Fairly OddParents, serving as the first special of the show. It was originally broadcast on Nickelodeon in the United States on July 12, 2003.

== Plot ==
All the fairies in Fairy World celebrate Timmy Turner's "Fairy-versary", a celebration of a godchild keeping his/her fairy godparents a secret for an entire year. Fairy godparent academy instructor Jorgen Von Strangle gives Timmy a magical muffin that allows anyone who eats it to have a "rule-free" wish. After the party, Timmy then asks how Cosmo and Wanda became his godparents. Wanda shows through a flashback that his parents lied to an 8-year-old Timmy and tricked him into hiring Vicky as his babysitter. Upset, Timmy inadvertently wishes that his parents could only tell him the truth. Mr. and Mrs. Turner begin to feel guilty, and they start counting the many times they have lied to Timmy.

Timmy takes the muffin to school but is followed by his fairy-obsessed teacher, Mr. Crocker, who detects the magic within the muffin. Crocker attempts to retrieve the muffin, but only gets it out of Timmy's possession. During "muffin day" at lunch, Timmy sees Crocker frantically searching for the muffin and creates a diversion with a food fight. However, before either one of them can find the muffin, Bippy, A.J's pet monkey that Timmy sets free, takes a bite out of the muffin and wishes the whole world to be transformed into a jungle, making monkeys and apes the rulers of Earth and humans as second class citizens. Consequently, all fairy godparents are assigned to primate children, with Cosmo and Wanda being assigned to Bippy.

Waking up in the treehouse version of Dimmsdale, Timmy returns to the jungle version of school and witnesses Crocker being arrested by the ape overlords for proclaiming his plan to use fairy magic to overthrow them. Using a magic detector stolen from the "Crocker Cave" and disguising himself as the trash can, Timmy heads to the Apes' Forbidden City and tracks down Bippy, still in possession of the muffin. Timmy almost succeeds in retrieving the muffin, but is captured and brought to a human testing center by the ape overlords, along with Crocker and Francis.

At Crocker's request, Timmy is taken to a surgical room where the ape overlords try to operate on his skull. Remembering the time he was freed by Timmy during the school’s food fight, Bippy fights to save Timmy by wishing away the monkey world, making humans the dominant species on Earth once again.

Unfortunately, after the world returns back to normal, Timmy and Bippy both discover that the muffin is now taken by Crocker, who then takes a bite from the muffin and wishes he could catch a fairy. Crocker obtains a butterfly net, one of the few items fairy magic has no effect on, and captures Wanda. Meanwhile, the news spreads to Fairy World, so Jorgen scrambles the fairies for war and symbolically destroys their homeworld's rainbow bridge to Earth. Timmy, knowing that Crocker plans to boast about his capture of Wanda to his students, hurries back to school. With his new-found power, Crocker terrorizes his students with a scepter holding Wanda hostage, then chases Timmy off as he transforms the world and makes himself the all-powerful magical dictator.

Timmy arms himself with various gifts from his Fairy-versary party and, disguised as a masked hero, engages Crocker in a magical duel. Crocker has the upper hand until Cosmo returns with greatly improved strength from an exercise video and overpowers him. Unfortunately, Cosmo lets his guard down and is captured as well, joining Wanda in Crocker's magic scepter. Timmy and Crocker fight through time and space before Timmy's cover is blown. Realizing he cannot destroy Timmy with magic, Crocker decides to threaten his parents. Returning home, Timmy, now captured by Crocker, sees his parents under the mercy of Crocker and surrenders. As he reconciles with his parents, he reveals that Cosmo and Wanda are his fairy godparents, causing them to be vacuumed out of Crocker's possession back to Fairy World as Timmy broke the sacred cardinal law of Da Rules by admitting he had fairy godparents. With Crocker now powerless, Mr. and Mrs. Turner pummel him, knocking the muffin out of his possession. Timmy grabs and eats the rest of the muffin, then wishes for his godparents to return and for everything to be restored to normal, undoing Crocker's reign of tyranny.

Back at school, Crocker attempts to convince everyone that fairies exist and bow down before him before being sedated and escorted to a mental institution. Jorgen shows up in Timmy's room, still seeking to take Cosmo and Wanda away as punishment for Timmy losing the muffin and nearly causing the destruction of the world, but Timmy throws a "Forget-Me-Knob" at Jorgen's head, causing him to forget what he was doing. Cosmo and Wanda then trick him into "assigning" Timmy as their godchild, then reenact their first meeting with Timmy. Fairy World's rainbow bridge is restored, and Crocker hears the fairies' cheers from within the institution, only for Timmy and his fairies to sedate him again.

== Cast ==
- Tara Strong as Timmy Turner / Kid
- Daran Norris as Cosmo / Mr. Turner / Jorgen Von Strangle
- Susanne Blakeslee as Wanda / Mrs. Turner
- Carlos Alazraqui as Denzel Crocker / Ape
- Grey DeLisle as Vicky / Principal Waxelplax / Tootie / Flashback Fairy
- Dee Bradley Baker as Bippy / Sanjay / Elmer / Kid / Fairy Private
- Tom Kenny as Cupid / Muffin Man / Kid / Fairy Sergeant / Flashback Fairy
- Jason Marsden as Chester McBadbat
- Gary LeRoi Gray as A.J.
- Robert Costanzo as Easter Bunny / Construction Worker Ape / Ape Truck Driver
- Faith Abrahams as Francis / Ape
- Butch Hartman as Flashback Boy / Web-Eared Guy / Third Kid / Orderly
- Cara Newman Ruyle as Flashback Girl / Female Ape #1 / Gorilla Business Woman
- Jim Ward as Chet Ubetcha
- Gary Le Mel as Fairy Cowlick Jr. (voice)
- Kevin Michael Richardson as Bad Guy / Business Man
- Steve Marmel as Bowling Pin / Warthog

== Release ==
"Abra-Catastrophe!" premiered on July 12, 2003. Attracting over 4 million views, the television film was the highest rated film on basic cable on the week it premiered. "Abra-Catastrophe" was released on a DVD and VHS tape of the same name on July 15, 2003, by Nickelodeon and Paramount Home Entertainment. The DVD version includes the episode itself and some bonus materials. It was also put on the season 3 DVD in 2011.

== Reception ==
On the day of its premiere, Robert Lloyd of the Los Angeles Times claimed that the film was "fun for the whole family", praising it for its moments of suspense as well as its references to popular culture. Jason Bovberg of DVD Talk criticized the film for its loud tone, although he praised the imaginative final act.

The song "Wish Come True!" received an Emmy Award nomination for Outstanding Original Music and Lyrics, but it lost to "Because You Are Beautiful" from the documentary V-Day: Until the Violence Stops.
