= The Fairly OddParents season 4 =

The Fairly OddParents
- Season 4
- DVD cover
- Showrunner: Butch Hartman
- No. of episodes: 20 (32 segments)

Release
- Original network: Nickelodeon
- Original release: November 7, 2003 – June 10, 2005

Season chronology
- ← Previous; Season 3 Next → Season 5

The fourth season of The Fairly OddParents began on November 7, 2003. The second movie, "Channel Chasers", aired in the summer of 2004, and for the 4th time, 2 Nicktoons make crossovers in The Jimmy Timmy Power Hour. The season officially ended with "School's Out!: The Musical" on June 10, 2005.

== Episodes ==
| No. overall | No. in season | Title | Directed by | Written by | Storyboard by | Original release date | Prod. code | Viewers (millions) |
|---|---|---|---|---|---|---|---|---|
| 40 | 1 | "Miss Dimmsdale" | Sarah Frost | Scott Fellows | Dave Thomas & Ian Graham | November 7, 2003 | FOP−182 | N/A |
| 40 | 1 | "Mind Over Magic" | Gary Conrad | Jack Thomas | Heather Martinez & Shawn Murray | November 7, 2003 | FOP−187 | N/A |
Vicky chooses to cheat her way into winning the Miss Dimmsdale pageant, and Timmy is going to stop her with the help of Catman. They decide to become judges to make up a law against Vicky winning. At the end, Timmy's Dad wins the pageant, disguising as a woman. Guest star: Adam West as Catman and himself Timmy, tired of Mr. Crocker's constant pop quizzes (in which he asks a question that no one can answer, or does not give enough time for people to answer), which everyone fails, wishes that he had mind reading powers. He uses this to pass Crocker's pop quizzes and mess with his friends' heads. Unfortunately, Crocker figures his wish out, and uses an anti-mind reading helmet (which causes someone trying to read the mind of the wearer to read their own mind instead) as part of a new plot to capture his fairies.
| 41 | 2 | "Shelf Life" | Wincat Alcala & Butch Hartman | Butch Hartman, Steve Marmel & Jack Thomas | Wincat Alcala, Ian Graham & Butch Hartman | September 10, 2004 (Note: This episode was first released in Canada on September 6, 2004.) | FOP−181 | N/A |
| 41 | 2 | "Shelf Life" | Wincat Alcala & Butch Hartman | Butch Hartman, Steve Marmel & Jack Thomas | Wincat Alcala, Ian Graham & Butch Hartman | September 10, 2004 | FOP−183 | N/A |
Timmy has to complete a book report during summer vacation, but now that summer is gone and the first day of Dimmsdale Elementary School is nearing, Timmy wishes that Tom Sawyer would come out of his book and help him write his book report. Being the lazy swindling type, Tom tricks Timmy into stealing Cosmo's wand and goes into a few well known books and edits them, forcing Timmy, Cosmo and Wanda to follow him. They now must end Tom's antics before he rewrites the laws of physics.
| 42 | 3 | "Hard Copy" | Sarah Frost | Scott Fellows | Heather Martinez & Shawn Murray | November 14, 2003 | FOP−188 | N/A |
| 42 | 3 | "Parent Hoods" | Gary Conrad & Ken Bruce | Butch Hartman, Steve Marmel & Jack Thomas | Maureen Mascarina & Dave Thomas | November 14, 2003 | FOP−184 | N/A |
While Cosmo and Wanda have to go to the doctor, Wanda grants Timmy a magic copier machine, with the ability to grant him whatever he wants. Problems arise when Timmy makes an action figure of Dark Laser (Parody of Darth Vader from Star Wars) and presses the life-size button (because he disliked the normal size), which causes Dark Laser to become real. While the Turners are on their way to Canada, a look-alike duo of bandits called the Turnbaums switch places with Timmy's parents in order to avoid getting punished, and Timmy is simply unable to wish his parents free, because even if magic is used, it could take years to get them out of jail under the US Legal System. It is up to Timmy to get the bandits captured and his parents freed.
| 43 | 4 | "Lights...Camera...Adam!" | Sarah Frost & Gary Conrad | Jack Thomas, Scott Fellows, Steve Marmel & Butch Hartman | Mike Manley | June 1, 2004 (Note: This episode was first released in Canada on February 29, 2004.) | FOP−185 | N/A |
| 43 | 4 | "A Bad Case of Diary-Uh!" | Sarah Frost & Gary Conrad | Karin Gutman | Heather Martinez & Shawn Murray | June 1, 2004 | FOP−189 | N/A |
Timmy makes changes to an unreleased blockbuster by bringing the actual Crimson Chin to defeat the evil director. Guest stars: Adam West as Catman and Jay Leno as The Crimson Chin Timmy is sick and tired of Vicky being mean to him, so he gets revenge by reading her diary and makes Vicky reveal all of her dark secrets in front of a British boy she likes, causing him to go out with another girl. Vicky becomes miserable and there is more trouble with Timmy's new and more evil babysitter. Timmy then tries to reverse this so they can get back together.
| 44 | 5 | "The Jimmy Timmy Power Hour" | Keith Alcorn & Butch Hartman | Story by : Rico Hall; Teleplay by : Gene Grillo, Butch Hartman & Steve Marmel | Paul Claerhout, Jason Dorf, Rod Douglas & Dan Nosella (3D segments); Ian Graham, Maureen Mascarina, Heather Martinez & Shawn Murray (2D segments) | May 7, 2004 | FOP−191 | 4.96 3.44 (HH) (Note: (HH) indicates the amount of households an episode was viewed in when it premiered.) |
| 44 | 5 | "The Jimmy Timmy Power Hour" | Keith Alcorn & Butch Hartman | Story by : Rico Hall; Teleplay by : Gene Grillo, Butch Hartman & Steve Marmel | Paul Claerhout, Jason Dorf, Rod Douglas & Dan Nosella (3D segments); Ian Graham, Maureen Mascarina, Heather Martinez & Shawn Murray (2D segments) | May 7, 2004 | FOP−192 | 4.96 3.44 (HH) |
In the first of a trilogy of crossover specials with Jimmy Neutron, Timmy wishes to go to the greatest lab in the universe for the science project, while Crocker is taking over the Fairy World. When Jimmy first appears in Dimmsdale, AJ's clones taunt him by saying, "We're still gonna kick your butt at the science fair tomorrow," but just then, Timmy's dad enters the room saying that he did not want to go to school because he did not finish his science project, implying that the science fair project was indeed due that day, while AJ had said it was tomorrow.
| 45 | 6 | "Baby Face" | Ken Bruce | Scott Fellows | Maureen Mascarina, Chris Garbutt & Dave Needham | March 19, 2004 (Note: This episode was first released in Australia on March 12, 2004.) | FOP−194 | N/A |
| 45 | 6 | "Mr. Right!" | Gary Conrad | Jack Thomas | Ian Graham & Aaron Rozenfeld | March 19, 2004 | FOP−190 | N/A |
Timmy's parents want him to stay at Flappy Bob's Learnatorium while they go to meet the President for his "State of the beach address". However, to get away from Francis and the bullies at the day care center, Timmy wishes that he was a baby, but he soon realizes he cannot unwish the wish because babies cannot talk. Guest star: Don Newhouse as Pops Timmy wishes that whatever he said was always right, but when he says he does not have Fairy Godparents to Crocker, Cosmo and Wanda disappear forever, and he must find a way to get them back without officially "blowing his secret".
| 46 | 7 | "Vicky Loses Her Icky" | Sarah Frost | Andrew Nicholls & Darrell Vickers | Maureen Mascarina, Aaron Rozenfeld & Wincat Alcala | February 20, 2004 | FOP−195 | N/A |
| 46 | 7 | "Pixies Inc." | Gary Conrad | Jack Thomas | Shawn Murray & Heather Martinez | February 20, 2004 | FOP−193 | N/A |
Because she is being mean, Timmy wishes that Vicky was nice, but the malicious spider-like bug that causes her to be mean gets on the loose and starts to target his dad, Principal Waxelplax, and almost the President. Timmy manages to get the bug back in Vicky's body, but Cosmo reveals he borrowed the President button machine, and when he presses it, he accidentally causes the dwarf planet Pluto to explode. Timmy, Cosmo, and Wanda find that FairyWorld has been taken over by a bunch of Pixies, and have to save FairyWorld by themselves. Guest star: Ben Stein as H.P., Sanderson and the Pixies
| 47 | 8 | "The Odd Couple" | Gary Conrad | Cynthia True | Heather Martinez & Shawn Murray | June 14, 2004 (Note: This episode was first released in Canada on April 6, 2004.) | FOP−186 | N/A |
| 47 | 8 | "Class Clown" | Ken Bruce | Andrew Nicholls & Darrell Vickers | Ian Graham & Tom King | June 14, 2004 | FOP−197 | N/A |
Timmy wishes that Vicky had a boyfriend so she would not bother Timmy as much, but his plan backfires when they both torture him. Timmy wishes he was the funniest man on Earth, but when Trixie is in trouble with a man-eating plant he gave her, he cannot unwish the wish because nobody takes him seriously.
| 48 | 9 | "The Big Superhero Wish!" | Gary Conrad & Sarah Frost | Butch Hartman & Steve Marmel | Heather Martinez, Shawn Murray, Aaron Rozenfeld & Tom King | February 16, 2004 | FOP−199 | 5.03 3.73 (HH) |
| 48 | 9 | "The Big Superhero Wish!" | Gary Conrad & Sarah Frost | Butch Hartman & Steve Marmel | Heather Martinez, Shawn Murray, Aaron Rozenfeld & Tom King | February 16, 2004 | FOP−200 | 5.03 3.73 (HH) |
After the events of third season episode "The Crimson Chin Meets Mighty Mom & Dyno Dad!", Timmy is tired of the normal everyday routine, and how he never gets any rescuing from his enemies. After a very bad day, he wishes that the world was like a comic book. As a result, everybody has a superpower, thus turning the good and Timmy into superheroes and the bad including his nemesises into supervillains. These supervillains, including Bull-E (Francis), The Baby Shredder (Vicky), and Dr. Crocktopus (Mr. Crocker), are then recruited by the Nega-Chin (who was unleashed with the wish) in an attempt to wreak havoc. Timmy then tries to unwish his wish, only to find that his wish has been apparently manipulated by the villains (who sense some kind of magic in his "Superhounds", Cosmo and Wanda in reality), so although they can keep their powers, the superheroes cannot. They then take these "Superhounds" away, leaving Timmy and his friends, including the Crimson Chin, to plan what to do next. They end up infiltrating the evil lair with the help of some "everyday heroes", including a firefighter girl, a old janitor, and a milkman who did not help him before when he needed help in everyday situations. He learns a lesson about how people do not have to have powers to be heroes. Guest stars: Jay Leno as The Crimson Chin and Nega-Chin and Patton Oswalt as the Crimson Chin Writer.
| 49 | 10 | "Power Pals" | Sarah Frost | Scott Fellows | Mike Manley | May 18, 2004 (Note: This episode was first released in Canada on April 19, 2004.) | FOP−196 | N/A |
| 49 | 10 | "Emotion Commotion!" | Ken Bruce | Jack Thomas | Ian Graham & Maureen Mascarina | May 18, 2004 | FOP−198 | N/A |
Having had enough of Timmy constantly taking advantage of them and treating them like slaves, Chester, A.J., Sanjay, and Elmer break off their friendship with him and form the "Anti-Timmy Force Four" to prevent Timmy from going any further. In retaliation, Timmy wishes for new superhero friends (Parody of Superman, Batman, Wonder Woman and Aquaman) to make them jealous. However, when his new Power Pals begin to take advantage of and mistreat him in the same way, Timmy has realized his mistake, especially when they mistake his old friends for supervillains and plan to kill them. Timmy wishes he had no emotions after being embarrassed by Francis forcing him to jump in a swimming pool and come out completely naked. He then must take a series of supposedly embarrassing risks.
| 50 | 11 | "Fairy Friends & Neighbors!" | Sarah Frost | Story by : Dave Thomas; Teleplay by : Scott Fellows & Jack Thomas | Heather Martinez, Shawn Murray & Dave Thomas | November 27, 2004 (Note: This episode was first released in Canada on April 29, 2004.) | FOP−202 | 4.25 2.94 (HH) |
| 50 | 11 | "Just the Two of Us!" | Ken Bruce | Jack Thomas, Scott Fellows & Jim Hecht | Maureen Mascarina & Aaron Rozenfeld | November 27, 2004 | FOP−201 | 4.25 2.94 (HH) |
Cosmo and Wanda befriend Timmy's parents when Timmy wants more time to himself, but he soon finds himself in trouble with Vicky torturing him. Timmy wishes he and Trixie were the only two people on earth, but soon Trixie goes insane when Timmy doesn't want to spend time complimenting her all the time.
| 51 | 12 | "Who's Your Daddy?" | Gary Conrad | Story by : Bob Boyle & Lewis Foulke; Teleplay by : Andrew Nicholls & Darrell Vickers | Maureen Mascarina & Aaron Rozenfeld | June 18, 2004 (Note: This episode was first released in Canada on May 4, 2004.) | FOP−209 | N/A |
| 51 | 12 | "Homewrecker" | Ken Bruce | Cynthia True | Tom King & Shawn Murray | June 18, 2004 | FOP−210 | N/A |
Timmy wants to find a Dad that will go to the Squirrly Scout Camp, because his own Dad is unavailable. Timmy gets even with Vicky by wrecking her house when he is forced to stay at her house for a day.
| 52 | 13 | "A New Squid in Town!" | Ken Bruce | Steve Marmel & Butch Hartman | Tom King & Butch Hartman | November 27, 2004 (Note: This episode was first released in Canada on September 6, 2004.) | FOP−214 | 4.15 2.89 (HH) |
| 52 | 13 | "Wish Fixers" | Sarah Frost | Scott Fellows | Maureen Mascarina & Aaron Rozenfeld | November 27, 2004 | FOP−211 | 4.15 2.89 (HH) |
Mark Chang uses his image fakifier to look like a human and hides in Dimmsdale from Mandie, a homicidal alien princess girl whom his parents want him to marry. The Pixies' CEO, H.P., starts a new business which is also a scheme to get rid of Cosmo and Wanda once and for all. Guest star: Ben Stein as H.P. and Sanderson
| 53 | 14 | "Truth or Cosmoquences" | Gary Conrad | Jack Thomas | Heather Martinez & Shawn Murray | February 15, 2005 (Note: This episode was first released in Canada on September 29, 2004.) | FOP−212 | N/A |
| 53 | 14 | "Beach Bummed!" | Sarah Frost | Scott Fellows & Jack Thomas | Dave Thomas, Tom King & Heather Martinez | February 15, 2005 | FOP−213 | N/A |
Cosmo tries to impress his classmates at a high school reunion by telling them that he is a self-billionaire and married to pop singer, Britney Britney. Meanwhile, Timmy desperately needs to use the bathroom after drinking too much lemonade. Timmy wants to impress Trixie so he wishes he was the strongest man on the beach, but he becomes increasingly larger, stronger, and more of a threat whenever a heftier creature steps on the sand.
| 54 | 15 | "Channel Chasers" | Butch Hartman | Steve Marmel & Butch Hartman | Dave Thomas, Rayfield Angrum, Chris Graham, Butch Hartman, Tom King, Mike Manley, Heather Martinez, Maureen Mascarina, Shawn Murray, Aaron Rozenfeld & Erik Wiese | July 23, 2004 | FOP−203 FOP−204 | 3.71 |
| 55 | 16 | "Channel Chasers" | Butch Hartman | Steve Marmel & Butch Hartman | Dave Thomas, Rayfield Angrum, Chris Graham, Butch Hartman, Tom King, Mike Manley, Heather Martinez, Maureen Mascarina, Shawn Murray, Aaron Rozenfeld & Erik Wiese | July 23, 2004 | FOP−205 FOP−206 | 3.71 |
| 56 | 17 | "Channel Chasers" | Butch Hartman | Steve Marmel & Butch Hartman | Dave Thomas, Rayfield Angrum, Chris Graham, Butch Hartman, Tom King, Mike Manley, Heather Martinez, Maureen Mascarina, Shawn Murray, Aaron Rozenfeld & Erik Wiese | July 23, 2004 | FOP−207 FOP−208 | 3.71 |
After being grounded for ruining both his parents’ jobs with various elements from a violent television show called "Maho Mushi" and punished with no more television, Timmy has had enough of tolerating his abusive babysitter Vicky. He wishes for a magical remote that allows him to enter inside television shows, but the magic remote falls into the clutches of Vicky, who plans to enter the biographical channel featuring "Dictator Week" so she can become a world dictator. Timmy wishes for another magical remote, and runs away into television with his fairies, soon meeting an older counterpart of himself who traveled back in time to warn him of Vicky's evil plans. Meanwhile, Timmy's parents, Mr. and Mrs. Turner, having dismissed their son's concerns of Vicky, refuse to believe that Timmy is innocent and Vicky is evil, until the fateful day when they receive information proving otherwise from Vicky's younger sister, Tootie, who fell in love with Timmy. Guest star: Alec Baldwin as Future Timmy and Adam West as himself
| 57 | 18 | "Catman Meets the Crimson Chin" | Ken Bruce | Scott Fellows | Shawn Murray & Tom King | January 17, 2005 (Note: This episode was first released in Australia on August 4, 2004.) | FOP−216 | N/A |
| 57 | 18 | "Genie Meanie Minie Mo" | Gary Conrad | Jack Thomas | Maureen Mascarina & Aaron Rozenfeld | January 17, 2005 | FOP−215 | 3.92 3.05 (HH) |
When Adam West as Catman is unaccepted as a superhero, Timmy wishes him into the world of the Crimson Chin. Unfortunately, after the Chin's long vacation, Catman manages to overthrow the Chin, forcing Timmy to reverse the situation and make Catman and the Chin allies. Guest stars: Adam West as Catman and Jay Leno as the Crimson Chin Timmy discovers a magic lamp revealing Norm the Genie. Since Norm offers to grant him three rule-free wishes, Timmy accepts, but getting what he wants might be harder than he expected. Guest star: Norm MacDonald as Norm the Genie
| 58 | 19 | "School's Out!: The Musical" | Butch Hartman | Steve Marmel & Butch Hartman | Dave Thomas, Tom King, Heather Martinez, Maureen Mascarina, Shawn Murray & Aaron Rozenfeld | June 10, 2005 | FOP−217 FOP−218 | 3.99 2.75 (HH) |
| 59 | 20 | "School's Out!: The Musical" | Butch Hartman | Steve Marmel & Butch Hartman | Dave Thomas, Tom King, Heather Martinez, Maureen Mascarina, Shawn Murray & Aaron Rozenfeld | June 10, 2005 | FOP−219 FOP−220 | 3.99 2.75 (HH) |
Summer has just begun, and all of the kids and their fairies are excited about their time-off. Unfortunately, their fun is short-lived because of the Pixies and the clown-turned businessman, Flappy Bob (who originally offered to keep the kids at his day care until school begins), attempt to take over the world. Timmy then becomes president of "KidWorld" and must figure out a way to stop them, or everyone's vacation will be ruined. Guest stars: Ben Stein as H.P. and Sanderson (speaking voice) and Method Man and Redman as H.P. and Sanderson (rapping voice)

== DVD releases ==
| Season | Episodes | Release dates | |
| Season | Episodes | Region 1 | Region 2 |
|---|---|---|---|
| 4 | 14 | Jimmy Timmy Power Hour: May 11, 2004; Episodes: 44 ("Jimmy Timmy Power Hour") Channel Chasers: October 5, 2004; Episodes: 54-56 ("Channel Chasers") Timmy's Top Wishes: January 18, 2005; Episodes: 49a & 51a ("Power Pals" and "Who's Your Daddy?") Nick Picks Vol. 1: May 24, 2005; Episodes: 44 ("Jimmy Timmy Power Hour") School's Out: The Musical: June 14, 2005; Episodes: 48 ("The Big Superhero Wish!") Scary GodParents: August 30, 2005; Episodes: 57 ("Catman Meets The Crimson Chin" / "Genie Meanie Minie Mo") Nick Picks Vol. 2: October 18, 2005; Episodes: 48 ("The Big Superhero Wish!") Season 4: June 3, 2011; Episodes: Entire season included The Complete Series: December 10, 2024; Episodes: Entire season included | Power Pals: July 21, 2008; Episodes: 48 ("Power Pals" / "Emotion Commotion"), 41 ("Shelf Life") and 51 ("A New Squid In Town" / "Wish Fixers") The Big Superhero Wish: September 21, 2009; Episodes: 48 ("The Big Superhero Wish"), 44 ("Baby Face" / "Mr Right"), 43 ("Lights, Camera, Adam!" / "A Bad Case of Diary-Uh"), and 47 ("The Odd Couple" / "Class Clown") |
