= Jimmy Neutron (franchise) =

American media franchise

- Created by: John A. Davis
- Original work: Jimmy Neutron: Boy Genius (2001)
- Owners: Nickelodeon Group (Skydance)
- Years: 2001–present

Films and television
- Film: Jimmy Neutron: Boy Genius (2001)
- Television series: The Adventures of Jimmy Neutron, Boy Genius (2002–06); Planet Sheen (2010–13)
- Television special: The Jimmy Timmy Power Hour (2004–06)
- Television film: Operation: Rescue Jet Fusion (2003)

Games
- Video games: Jimmy Neutron: Boy Genius (2001); Jimmy Neutron vs. Jimmy Negatron (2002); The Adventures of Jimmy Neutron Boy Genius: Jet Fusion (2003); The Adventures of Jimmy Neutron Boy Genius: Attack of the Twonkies (2004)

Miscellaneous
- Theme park attraction: Jimmy Neutron's Nicktoon Blast (2003–11)

Jimmy Neutron is an American animated media franchise created by John A. Davis and owned by the Nickelodeon Group division of Skydance. The franchise, which originated from the 2001 film Jimmy Neutron: Boy Genius, centers on the titular character, a young boy with a genius-level intellect. In addition to the feature film, the franchise also consists of a television series, a spin-off series focusing on Sheen Estevez, several video games, a three-part crossover special with The Fairly OddParents, and a theme park attraction at Universal Studios Florida.

== Films ==
=== Jimmy Neutron: Boy Genius ===
After the pilot was completed, Nickelodeon executives, who were impressed by the pilot and still enthusiastic about the show's potential, raised the prospect of creating a theatrical film to accompany the TV series, much to the surprise of Davis and his team at the studio. During the initial pitch to Nickelodeon, Oedekerk had highlighted the idea that using computer animation would allow the same models and assets to be reused between both a film and a TV show, an idea which Nick held a strong faith in. Davis further suggested that the feature film be created first, since the characters being modeled could be created at a higher quality than they would have been on a TV budget. Nick was worried that it would be more difficult to attract a movie-going audience without the TV show to build an install base for the series, but these concerns were answered by a series of short TV interstitials that began airing to hype the upcoming film. The film was a box-office and critical success and was nominated for the inaugural Academy Award for Best Animated Feature at the 74th Academy Awards along with Monsters, Inc., but lost to Shrek.

=== Possible sequel ===
In February 2002, a sequel was reported to be in development for a 2004 release. Producer Albie Hecht told the Los Angeles Times the sequel "would be made on the same budget as the first, but with a new batch of inventions and adventures in Jimmy's town of Retroville." On June 20, 2002, The Hollywood Reporter reported that writer Kate Boutilier had signed a writing deal with Nickelodeon Movies and Paramount Pictures to write the sequel, but the film was canceled because the writers could not agree on a story. Alcorn later said, "once the TV series came out, there wasn't a lot of incentive to make a movie when fans could simply watch Jimmy Neutron for free at home."

In 2016, director John A. Davis said he had a story for a Jimmy Neutron reboot feature he wanted to make but was waiting for the "right situation".

When asked about a reboot in 2020, Rob Paulsen said: "Well, I've got to tell you, man. I go all over the world when we don't have the coronavirus, and people love Carl. They love Carl. I don't think it would be a bad thing at all to reboot Jimmy Neutron. I think that's one of those shows that a lot of people would love to see again. It was very good. Really smart. That wouldn't surprise me."

In 2025, screenwriter Adam Pava said a potential new film project based on the character had been in the works since December 2023.

== Television series ==
The Adventures of Jimmy Neutron, Boy Genius (the first series): Throughout the show, various mishaps and conflicts occur on these adventures, as Jimmy's various inventions go awry. The series was well-received. DNA Productions retooled their pipeline when moving from the film to the TV series, to reuse assets for the episodes. Some of the programming team at the studio programmed a special code that allowed the animators to animate scenes in Maya, which can then be rendered in Lightwave. This helped the team keep up with the deadline and avoid going over budget.

Planet Sheen (the second series) was a spin-off focusing on Sheen. Originally designed as a series called Red Acres, it was unrelated to Jimmy Neutron, but after multiple network rejections, including Cartoon Network and Disney Channel, the series was re-developed to what would become Planet Sheen. The series was not well received by fans, but critics had mixed reviews.

== Specials ==
The Jimmy Timmy Power Hour is a trilogy of television crossover specials set between the universes of the animated television series The Adventures of Jimmy Neutron, Boy Genius and The Fairly OddParents. The saga consists of The Jimmy Timmy Power Hour, The Jimmy Timmy Power Hour 2: When Nerds Collide!, and The Jimmy Timmy Power Hour 3: The Jerkinators!, which premiered on Nickelodeon between 2004 and 2006, and were subsequently released to home video. The specials combine multiple types of animation, using traditional 2D animation for the segments set in the Fairly OddParents universe and CGI for the Jimmy Neutron segments.

== Video games ==
- Jimmy Neutron: Boy Genius – the first game was based on the film
- Jimmy Neutron vs. Jimmy Negatron – Jimmy meets Jimmy Negatron, an evil version of Neutron from another dimension; Negatron plans on taking over Retroville and Jimmy must stop him
- The Adventures of Jimmy Neutron Boy Genius: Jet Fusion – Based on the TV movie of the same name
- The Adventures of Jimmy Neutron Boy Genius: Attack of the Twonkies – based on the episode of the same name
- Characters from the franchise have also appeared in nearly 15 different Nickelodeon crossover video games.

== Shorts ==
- Runaway Rocket Boy, premiered in autumn 1998, during these shorts he was called Johnny Quasar
- Film Promotion Shorts (1999–2001), a number of shorts were produced

== Cast ==
Character	Voiced by	Jimmy Neutron: Boy Genius	The Adventures of Jimmy Neutron, Boy Genius			The Jimmy Timmy Power Hour			Planet Sheen		Count
Character	Voiced by	Jimmy Neutron: Boy Genius	1	2	3	1	2	3	1a	1b	Count
Jimmy Neutron	Debi Derryberry	Main	Main	Main	Main	Main	Main	Main			59
Sheen Estevez	Jeff Garcia	Main	Main	Main	Main	Main	Main	Main	Main	Main	87
Carl Wheezer	Rob Paulsen	Main	Main	Main	Main	Main	Main	Main	Guest		65
Cindy Vortex	Carolyn Lawrence	Main	Main	Main	Main	Main	Main	Main			59
Libby Folfax	Crystal Scales	Main	Main	Main	Main	Main	Main	Main			45
Goddard	Frank Welker	Main	Main	Main	Main	Main	Main	Main			57
Hugh Neutron	Mark DeCarlo	Main	Main	Main	Main	Main	Main	Main			57
Judy Neutron	Megan Cavanagh	Main	Main	Main	Main	Main	Main	Main			49
Ms. Winfred Fowl	Andrea Martin	Main	Recurring	Recurring	Recurring						49
King Goobot V	Patrick Stewart; S. Scott Bullock	Main	Guest		Guest						3
Finbarr Calamitous	Tim Curry (Note: Professor Finbarr Calamitous is voiced by Ming-Na Wen and Jim Meskimen respectively in the guises of Princess Quin Shi Su and Quentin Smithee.)		Also starring	Also starring	Also starring		Main				8
Emperor	Fred Tatasciore								Main	Main	44
Doppy Doppweiller	Rob Paulsen								Main	Main	44
Nesmith	Bob Joles								Main	Main	38
Pinter	Thomas Lennon								Main	Main	30
Princess Oom	Candi Milo								Main	Main	30
Aseefa	Soleil Moon Frye								Main	Main	26
Dorkus	Jeff Bennett								Main	Main	22

== Rides and attractions ==
- Jimmy Neutron's Nicktoon Blast, a simulator ride at Universal Studios Florida
- Jimmy Neutron's Atomic Flyer, a steel suspended family roller coaster at Movie Park Germany

== Merchandise ==
Jakks Pacific and Mattel produced toys based on the property.
