= Carolyn Lawrence =

American voice actress (born 1966 or 1967)

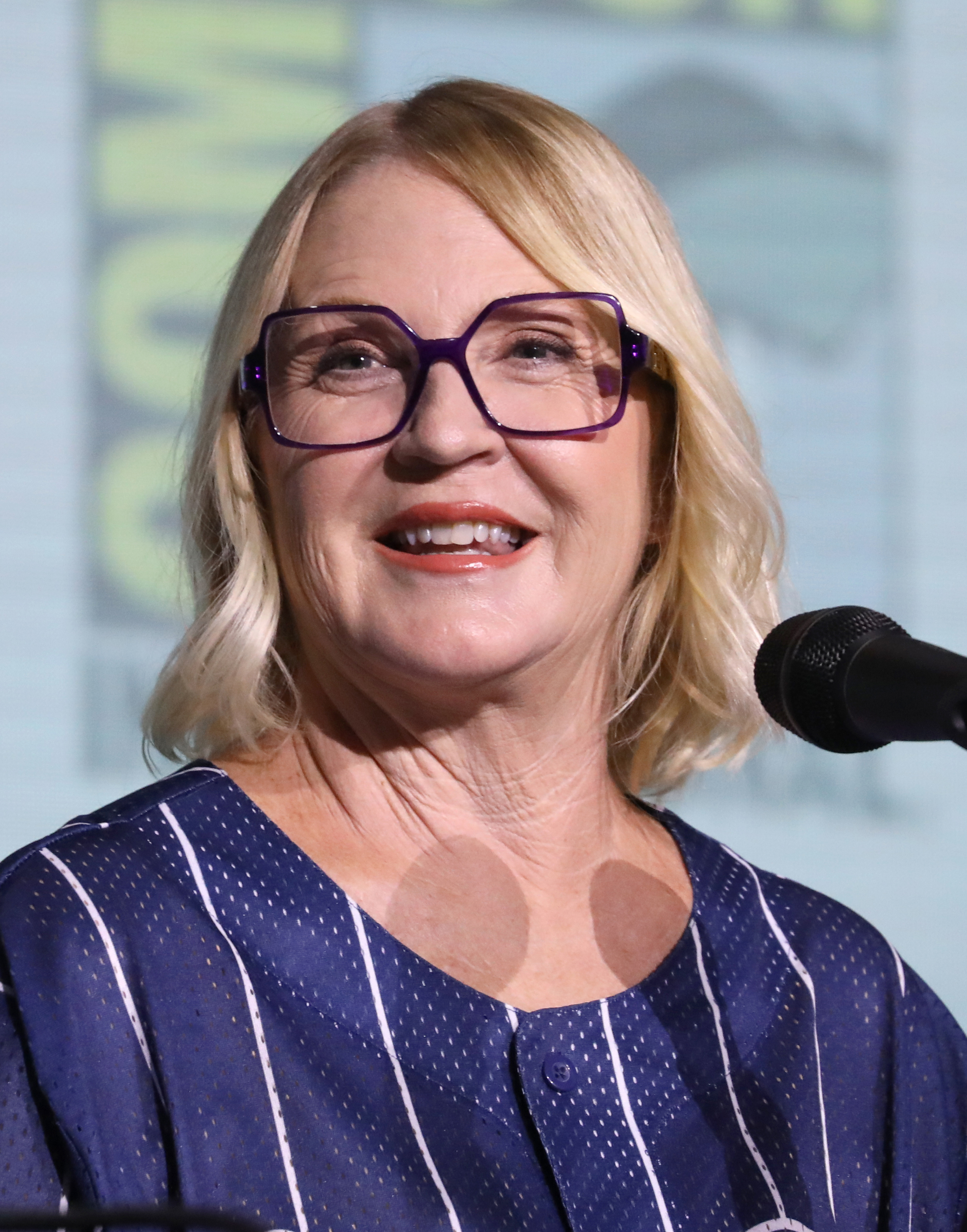
- Lawrence in 2024
- Born: 1966 or 1967 (age 59–60)
- Occupation: Voice actress
- Years active: 1987–present
- Known for: Sandy Cheeks in SpongeBob SquarePants; Cindy Vortex in Jimmy Neutron; Orel Puppington in Moral Orel; Ashley Graham in Resident Evil 4
- Spouse: Michael Stoyanov (m. 1988; div. 2005)
- Children: 2

Carolyn Lawrence (born 1966 or 1967) is an American voice actress. She is known for her voice roles on Nickelodeon animated shows, including Sandy Cheeks on SpongeBob SquarePants, Cindy Vortex on Jimmy Neutron, and Mandragora in the Nickelodeon version of Winx Club. She also voiced the title character on Adult Swim original series Moral Orel and Ashley Graham in the original version of Resident Evil 4.

== Life and career ==
Lawrence attended Big Walnut High School in Sunbury, Ohio where she was part of the choir. She left high school to take dance classes in Chicago. Since then, she began her long-running role as Sandy Cheeks on SpongeBob SquarePants. She was also the voice of Cindy Vortex in the film Jimmy Neutron: Boy Genius and its spinoff series The Adventures of Jimmy Neutron, Boy Genius, as well as the title character, Orel Puppington, in Moral Orel. Lawrence is the voice of Ashley Graham, the U.S. president's daughter, in all releases of the 2005 survival horror video game Resident Evil 4. She plays Christy Allison on the video podcast Goodnight Burbank.

Lawrence has two children. She is also a licensed real estate agent in the Los Angeles metropolitan area.

== Filmography ==
=== Film ===
Year	Title	Role	Notes
1991	Little Man Tate	Sorority Girl	
2001	Amélie	Amélie Poulain (voice)	
2001	Jimmy Neutron: Boy Genius	Cindy Vortex (voice)	
2003	Vampires Anonymous	Penelope	
2004	Party Wagon	Ornery Sue, Wagonmaster's Wife, Daughter #3	TV
2004	Catching Kringle	Snowflake	
2004	The SpongeBob SquarePants Movie	Sandy Cheeks (voice)	Cameo
2006	Goodnight Burbank	Christy Allison	
2011	Stan	Family Friend	
2012	Winx Club: The Secret of the Lost Kingdom	Mandragora (voice)	
2015	The SpongeBob Movie: Sponge Out of Water	Sandy Cheeks (voice)	
2020	The SpongeBob Movie: Sponge on the Run	Sandy Cheeks (voice)	
2024	Saving Bikini Bottom: The Sandy Cheeks Movie	Sandy Cheeks (voice)	
2025	Plankton: The Movie	Sandy Cheeks (voice)	
2025	The SpongeBob Movie: Search for SquarePants	Sandy Cheeks (voice)	Cameo

=== Television ===
Year	Title	Role	Notes
1987	Tales of Little Women	Amy March (voice)	Main role
1994	Weird Science	Dasha	Episode: "Future Bride"
1994–1995	Mike & Spike	Michelle Baby	2 episodes
1995	Muscle	Karen Anders	
1995	Caroline in the City	Nurse	Episode: "Caroline and Victor/Victoria"
1996	Wings	May	Episode: "Grouses, Houses, and Bickering Spouses"
1996	7th Heaven	Operator	Episode: "Red Tape"
1997	Union Square	Michelle	Episode: "Enjoy Your Haddock"
1999–present	SpongeBob SquarePants	Sandy Cheeks (voice)	Main role
2002–2006	The Adventures of Jimmy Neutron: Boy Genius	Cindy Vortex (voice)	Main role
2003	A Minute with Stan Hooper	Marjorie	2 episodes
2004–2006	The Jimmy Timmy Power Hour	Cindy Vortex, Mrs. Folfax (voice)	Main role
2004	Boston Legal	Thirty-Year-Old Juror	Episode: "Shock and Oww!"
2005–2008, 2012	Moral Orel	Orel Puppington (voice)	Main role
2006	The Fairly OddParents	Ms. Sunshine (voice)	Episode: "No Substitute for Crazy!"
2006	Goodnight Burbank	Christy Allison	
2006	Danger Rangers	Ana, Millie (voice)	Episode: "Kitty's Surprise Party!"
2021–2024	Kamp Koral: SpongeBob's Under Years	Sandy Cheeks (voice)	Main role
2021–present	The Patrick Star Show	Sandy Cheeks (voice)	Recurring role

=== Video games ===
Year	Title	Role	Notes
2000	Spyro: Year of the Dragon	Zoe, Greta, Tara Kroft, Elora	
2001	SpongeBob SquarePants: SuperSponge	Sandy Cheeks	
2001	SpongeBob SquarePants: Operation Krabby Patty	Sandy Cheeks	
2001	Jimmy Neutron: Boy Genius	Cindy Vortex	PC version
2002	Spyro: Enter the Dragonfly	Zoe, Additional voices	
2002	SpongeBob SquarePants: Employee of the Month	Sandy Cheeks	
2002	SpongeBob SquarePants: Revenge of the Flying Dutchman	Sandy Cheeks	
2002	Jimmy Neutron vs. Jimmy Negatron	Cindy Vortex	
2002	Jimmy Neutron: Boy Genius	Cindy Vortex, Sandra Vortex, Grace, Rose	PS2 Version
2003	SpongeBob SquarePants: Battle for Bikini Bottom	Sandy Cheeks, Mermalair Computer	
2003	Ratchet & Clank: Going Commando	Mother, Child	
2003	The Adventures of Jimmy Neutron Boy Genius: Jet Fusion	Cindy Vortex	
2003	Nickelodeon Toon Twister 3-D	Cindy Vortex	
2004	EverQuest II	Captain Helysianna/Queen Zynixi/Flamestalker/Ambassador Kialee/Tseralith 1/Scholar Neola/Lyris Moonbane	
2004	The Adventures of Jimmy Neutron Boy Genius: Attack of the Twonkies	Cindy Vortex	
2005	Resident Evil 4	Ashley Graham	
2005	SpongeBob SquarePants: Lights, Camera, Pants!	Sandy Cheeks	
2005	Nicktoons Unite!	Sandy Cheeks, Cindy Vortex, Female Fairy	
2006	Nicktoons: Battle for Volcano Island	Sandy Cheeks	
2007	SpongeBob's Atlantis SquarePantis	Sandy Cheeks	
2008	SpongeBob SquarePants Featuring Nicktoons: Globs of Doom	Cindy Vortex	
2010	SpongeBob's Boating Bash	Sandy Cheeks	
2011	Nicktoons MLB	Sandy Cheeks	
2013	SpongeBob SquarePants: Plankton's Robotic Revenge	Sandy Cheeks	
2015	SpongeBob HeroPants	Sandy Cheeks/The Rodent	
2020	SpongeBob SquarePants: Battle for Bikini Bottom – Rehydrated	Sandy Cheeks, Mermalair Computer	Archival recordings
2021	Nickelodeon All-Star Brawl	Sandy Cheeks	Voiceover added in the June 2022 update
2022	Nickelodeon Kart Racers 3: Slime Speedway	Sandy Cheeks, Cindy Vortex	
2023	SpongeBob SquarePants: The Cosmic Shake	Sandy Cheeks, Additional voices	
2024	SpongeBob SquarePants: The Patrick Star Game	Sandy Cheeks	
2025	Nicktoons & The Dice of Destiny	Sandy Cheeks	
2025	SpongeBob SquarePants: Titans of the Tide	Sandy Cheeks	

=== Audiobooks ===
Year	Title	Role
1996	Goosebumps - A Shocker on Shock Street	Erin Wright
