= List of Jimmy Neutron characters =

From left to right: Cindy, Jimmy with Goddard, Libby, Nick, Sheen, Carl, and Judy and Hugh Neutron.

This is a list of characters in the American film Jimmy Neutron: Boy Genius, its subsequent television series The Adventures of Jimmy Neutron, Boy Genius and other media of the franchise.

== Cast table ==
Character	Voiced by	Jimmy Neutron: Boy Genius	The Adventures of Jimmy Neutron, Boy Genius			The Jimmy Timmy Power Hour			Planet Sheen		Count
Character	Voiced by	Jimmy Neutron: Boy Genius	1	2	3	1	2	3	1a	1b	Count
Jimmy Neutron	Debi Derryberry	Main	Main	Main	Main	Main	Main	Main			59
Sheen Estevez	Jeffrey Garcia	Main	Main	Main	Main	Main	Main	Main	Main	Main	87
Carl Wheezer	Rob Paulsen	Main	Main	Main	Main	Main	Main	Main	Guest		65
Cindy Vortex	Carolyn Lawrence	Main	Main	Main	Main	Main	Main	Main			59
Libby Folfax	Crystal Scales	Main	Main	Main	Main	Main	Main	Main			45
Goddard	Frank Welker	Main	Main	Main	Main	Main	Main	Main			57
Hugh Neutron	Mark DeCarlo	Main	Main	Main	Main	Main	Main	Main			57
Judy Neutron	Megan Cavanagh	Main	Main	Main	Main	Main	Main	Main			49
Ms. Winfred Fowl	Andrea Martin	Main	Recurring	Recurring	Recurring						49
King Goobot V	Patrick Stewart; S. Scott Bullock	Main	Guest		Guest						3
Finbarr Calamitous	Tim Curry (Note: Professor Finbarr Calamitous is voiced by Ming-Na Wen and Jim Meskimen respectively in the guises of Princess Quin Shi Su and Quentin Smithee.)		Also starring	Also starring	Also starring		Main				8
Emperor	Fred Tatasciore								Main	Main	44
Doppy Doppweiller	Rob Paulsen								Main	Main	44
Nesmith	Bob Joles								Main	Main	38
Pinter	Thomas Lennon								Main	Main	30
Princess Oom	Candi Milo								Main	Main	30
Aseefa	Soleil Moon Frye								Main	Main	26
Dorkus	Jeff Bennett								Main	Main	22

== Main ==
=== Jimmy Neutron ===
James Isaac "Jimmy" Neutron (voiced by Debi Derryberry) is an extremely intelligent 11-year-old boy who uses lots of scientific knowledge and inventions to solve problems, most of which he causes himself. His name is a reference to Isaac Newton. He is the son of Judy and Hugh Neutron. Although he is a genius, he is a kid at heart and has more often than not proven so. Due to the events in Retroville, Jimmy is key in resolving most situations. Jimmy will usually exclaim "Gotta think..." when he begins formulating a solution for the dilemma, accessing a vast wealth of information gathered during the dilemma. Once he has developed a plan, he usually exclaims "Brain blast!" His best friends are Sheen Estévez, Carl Wheezer and his robot dog Goddard. He and Cindy Vortex usually have a dislike for each other, although it is revealed in later episodes that they secretly love each other. In addition to his parents, several of his other relatives have also appeared on the show.

=== Carl Wheezer ===
Carlton Ulysses "Carl" Wheezer (voiced by Rob Paulsen in the film and TV series and Wally Wingert in the 2002 PS2 and GameCube game) is a bespectacled, neurotic, and gullible boy and one of Jimmy's best friends. Carl and his parents have numerous allergies, at times even to things that are incapable of triggering allergic reactions. He passionately loves llamas, hanging posters of them throughout his room and playing llama-themed video games. His passion for llamas is often used as a running gag throughout the series. In later episodes, until knowing Elke and falling in love with her, his apparent crush on Jimmy's mom was a running gag, and he sometimes taped his own face over Hugh's in pictures. Since the episode "Carl Wheezer, Boy Genius" he met the Swedish girl Elke Elkberg and fell in love with her. An extraterrestrial character named Doppy, with many similarities to Carl, is a main character in Planet Sheen.

His extreme unhealthy obsession for the llama originated when his parents expanded their cable lineup and he became devoted to a show called Llama Boy The Super Hero that aired on a channel dedicated to the animal. Since his obsession with llamas began, he has gone to great lengths to express his love and care for them, going as far as to join a fan club called The Llama Love Society, which he likely created himself.

It is worth noting, Carl is afraid of lima beans, germs, and scary stories. He is also known to have asthma and uses an inhaler, and he is very stressed about his multitude of allergies and is extremely terrified of getting any sort of illness, similar to his parents. Also, when he is tired, his mom makes him warm milk, rubs his tummy, and sings "nani nani nani", which he blurts out in an episode.

A recurring gag throughout the series is Carl singing melodramatic ballads about mundane tasks, such as "Folding and Hanging", "Bending and Stretching" or the self-referential "Sitting and Singing".

=== Sheen Estévez ===
Ramón Juarrea "Sheen" Estévez (voiced by Jeff Garcia) is Jimmy's slightly older, hyperactive, addled best friend, characterized by his unhealthy obsession with the fictional superhero "Ultra Lord" and the television series, video games, and merchandising inspired by the character. Sheen lives with his father, sister, and grandmother. Sheen's father makes a brief appearance in season one, though his face is not shown.

Sheen is noted for his extreme, constant bouts of hyperactivity, which he demonstrates multiple times per episode, along with his misdirected, limited intelligence and short attention span, much to the annoyance of his peers. Alongside UltraLord, Sheen also appears to be interested in superheroes in general and in typical masculine subjects such as wrestling and is strongly infatuated with Libby, becoming her boyfriend by the time of the program's conclusion.

Sheen stars in the spin-off series Planet Sheen, which premiered in 2010. In the series, Sheen is stranded on the planet Zeenu after sneaking into Jimmy's lab and stealing his new rocket ship, which blasts him into space. He is never shown returning to Earth. However, in the episode "The Tomorrow Boys", Sheen is shown to be living on Earth in the future.

Sheen was conceived as Japanese-American, but his ethnicity was changed to Mexican American after Jeff Garcia portrayed him this way during auditions since other voice actors who were considered for the role struggled to give him a Japanese-type accent. His full name is a reference to the last names of both stage names and real names of father-son actors Martin Sheen, Charlie Sheen, and Emilio Estévez.

=== Cindy Vortex ===
Cynthia Aurora "Cindy" Vortex (voiced by Carolyn Lawrence) is a blonde-haired girl who lives across the street from Jimmy's house. She is a very sarcastic and independent tomboy who enjoys tai chi and karate and will do anything for attention. She is also very smart and achieves the highest grades in her class besides Jimmy, a point of competition and dislike between the two of them. She feels that Jimmy is only ahead of her because he was given the better lot in life, and envies his lab. Despite frequently talking down to Jimmy and labeling him a "nerd", she herself is not popular with many people aside from her best friend Libby. She has always had a crush on Jimmy, but because of her pride it takes a while for her to admit it. In seasons 2 and 3, Jimmy and Cindy are placed in multiple situations where they need to work together, causing them to eventually come to terms with and realize their affection for each other. She often serves as an antagonist, but Jimmy also considers her part of his friend group.

=== Libby Folfax ===
Liberty Danielle "Libby" Folfax (voiced by Crystal Scales) is a popular-styled African-American girl who is known as the "cool girl" of the team and at the school. She is Cindy's best friend. Libby is a dancer and especially adores funk music, emo rock, and boy bands. Early in the series, Libby does not care very much for Jimmy and his friends, often siding with Cindy, but as the series continues, Libby becomes more attached to Jimmy, Carl, and Sheen. In the episode "Beach Party Mummy", Libby takes on a braided bob hairstyle while posing as the Egyptian queen Hasabataslapya, and maintains this hairstyle for the rest of the series. After Sheen professes his crush to her in "Love Potion 976/J", Libby takes a romantic interest in him.

Libby's father appears in the episodes "Make Room for Daddy-O", "Men at Work", and "Win Lose and Kaboom", and makes cameo appearances in several other episodes. Libby's mother appears in "Journey to the Center of Carl" and "The N-Men".

=== Goddard ===
Goddard (voiced by Frank Welker) is a robotic dog, invented by Jimmy. He is loyal to his owner and often accompanies him on his adventures, including to different planets. Jimmy has programmed Goddard to arrive when called via Jimmy's phone. Goddard has various features including self-propelled flight, storage, and a rocket propelled bicycle-like transportation, complete with handle bars. Jimmy often uses Goddard to help brainstorm options for his dilemmas, which Goddard displays on a computer monitor that is normally covered by his breastplate. He has mostly the disposition of a normal dog, but occasionally uses voice clips to communicate. Jimmy can have Goddard "play dead", which causes him to self-destruct and instantly reconstruct his body without assistance. He is named after physicist Robert H. Goddard.

=== Hugh Neutron ===
Hugh Beaumont Neutron (voiced by Mark DeCarlo) is Jimmy's father and Judy's husband. He is portrayed as a happy-go-lucky, duck-obsessed, clueless, dimwitted but good-natured man who works in an automotive assembly plant. He frequently offers advice to Jimmy in an attempt to be a better father. Ducks are Hugh's favorite hobby; he enjoys collecting and buffing duck decoys, displaying them around the house. The character is named after actor Hugh Beaumont, who played Ward Cleaver in Leave it to Beaver. His voice was in part an impression of one of the series producers, Paul Marshal.

=== Judy Neutron ===
Judith "Judy" Neutron (voiced by Megan Cavanagh) is a homemaker and baker, Jimmy's mother and Hugh's wife. She is a responsible parent for her son Jimmy, and often takes on a similar role for her husband Hugh. She addresses Jimmy by his full name whenever she scolds him or one of his inventions messes up. Regardless, she has stated that she appreciates her union to Hugh and is happy in their marriage.

== Supporting ==
=== Ms. Fowl ===
Ms. Winifred Fowl (voiced by Andrea Martin) is the teacher for Jimmy and his friends, who both resembles and, when speaking, frequently squawks like a chicken, hence her surname.

=== Nick Dean ===
Nicholas "Nick" Dean (voiced by Candi Milo) is the "cool" and most popular boy at school who is often seen on a skateboard, doing dangerous tricks. He does not participate in his school's show and tell activities and sometimes arrives at school five minutes before dismissal. Nick is obsessed with styling his hair, and is considered very handsome by all girls in the school. Nick is one of the town's wealthiest children, living in a 92-room mansion, with a bowling alley, maids' quarters, a screening room, and a soda parlor.

=== UltraLord ===
UltraLord (voiced by Jim Cummings in the film and TV series and Rob Paulsen in the PC 2001 video game) is a superhero for whom Sheen has an unhealthy obsession and who stars in a TV series of the same name. His main enemy is Robo-Fiend. Sheen has the largest UltraLord action figure collection and is offended when other characters call them "dolls".

=== Butch Pakovski ===
Butch (voiced by Billy West in the film and Rob Paulsen in the TV series) is a slightly slack-jawed bully. Butch may have a softer side as he is seen in one episode clearing his anger with stacking sticks. In the beginning of the episode "Jimmy Goes to College", Jimmy uses sophisticated words to describe his unstable molecules and Butch holds his head, saying "Big words! They hurt! They hurt!".

=== Mr. and Mrs. Wheezer ===
Ebenezer and Martha Wheezer (both voiced by Rob Paulsen) are Carl's parents who are very overprotective and share many of his allergies and hypochondriac tendencies. In one episode, Ebenezer states that he is allergic to ice; this leads to an allergy to water. In "The Mighty Wheezers", Ebenezer and Martha also happen to be allergic to almost every kind of food, eating an edible substitute matter instead. At night, they do stretches while making weird noises before dinner, participate in a "good family gargle before bedtime at 7:30pm", and instead of watching television, they sit on the couch and sing "singing and sitting" numerous times before bed.

=== Principal Willoughby ===
Principal Willoughby (voiced by Rob Paulsen) is the flamboyant, Broadway-loving principal of Lindbergh Elementary School. He seems to genuinely care about his students, and has clearly taken the time to get to know each and every one. He has a sister named Eunice who looks like the late Albert Einstein, and comments on always getting them confused.

=== Sam Melvick ===
Sam Melvick (voiced by Billy West) is the disgruntled, grumpy and hot-tempered owner of the Candy Bar, an ice cream shop in Retroville where Jimmy and his friends often meet. He frequently says "Yeah!" at the end of his sentences.

=== Bolbi Stroganovsky ===
Bolbi Stroganovsky, also known as the "boy from fairytale land" or the "boy with the funny name", (voiced by Phil LaMarr), is an exchange student from Backhairistan. He normally speaks broken English, but is shown to have a surprisingly good Shakespearean acting voice when auditioning for a play. He dresses in stereotypical Eastern European garb and has an accent of indeterminate origin. Bolbi has a musical pet goat named Yurri.

== Other recurring ==
=== Britney Tenelli ===
Britney Tenelli (voiced by Candi Milo) is a friend of Cindy and Libby who is also a backup dancer with them. Britney usually appears as a background character but occasionally hangs around with Cindy and Libby.

=== Brobot ===
Brobot (voiced by Paul Greenberg) is a robotic brother that Jimmy created after feeling lonely. However, Jimmy quickly became annoyed with Brobot. Although Brobot irritates Jimmy, it is shown that he cares about Brobot; when Jimmy disconnects him, he cries "What have I done?" Jimmy decides to send Brobot to live on the Moon with robotic parents, Popbot (voiced by Jim Cummings) and Mombot. Brobot and his parents return in an episode of the second season, when Popbot and Mombot are kidnapped by the Junkman, who plans to recycle them and sell their parts for a profit. Brobot later returns in "The League of Villains".

=== Betty Quinlan ===
Elizabeth "Betty" Quinlan (voiced by Kath Soucie) is the pretty and most popular girl at the school being the "school sweetheart" at it and Jimmy's crush. She is usually nice to him, and has the unintentional ability to make him do things he normally would not do. Betty starred her own three-episode story arc with "Party at Neutron's" "Out, Darn Spotlight" and "Vanishing Act" where she does what she is known for and to like with Jimmy: dancing, acting and magic. In "Vanishing Act", Betty also told Cindy that she is fully aware of Jimmy and Cindy's feelings for each other, and told her, "Just relax and keep out of my face. He's all yours.".

=== Corky Shimatzu ===
Corky Shimatzu (voiced by Billy West) is a famous Japanese big-shot television producer, whose catchphrase is "Super Fantastic!".

=== Jet Fusion ===
Jet Fusion (voiced by Christian Slater in the TV Series and Dave Fouquette in the video game) is an athlete, actor, and spy who is admired by Jimmy, Carl, and Sheen. His name is a play on James Bond and he wears a tuxedo with the sleeves torn off.

== Villains ==
=== Yolkians ===
The Yolkians are a race of egg yolk-like aliens in egg-like anti-gravity suits:

==== King Goobot V ====
King Goobot V (voiced by Patrick Stewart in the film, S. Scott Bullock in the TV series and Joe Whyte in the video game) is the king of the Yolkians. In the film, Goobot has his armada kidnap all the parents in Retroville and attempts to sacrifice them to the Yolkian god Poultra, a giant monstrous chicken. He is stopped by Jimmy and all the other children.

Goobot returns in the TV series episode "The Eggpire Strikes Back", wanting to make amends with Retroville and claiming that Poultra forced him into evil. This ploy was part of Goobot's plot to get into Jimmy's lab and use his cloning machine to recreate Poultra. King Goobot is defeated again by Jimmy.

In "The League of Villains", King Goobot formed the titular team by gathering Junkman, Baby Eddie, Grandma Taters, Eustace Strytch, Professor Finbarr Calamitous, Beautiful Gorgeous, and the Space Bandits in a plot to get revenge on Jimmy Neutron.

==== Ooblar ====
Ooblar (voiced by Martin Short in the film, Paul Greenberg in the TV series and Mark DeCarlo in the video game) is the younger brother of King Goobot. In the episode "The League of Villains", Ooblar is revealed to have been released from Goobot's service after being traded to the Bulgosians for sulfur butter.

==== Yolkian Fleet Commander ====
The Fleet Commander (voiced by Rob Paulsen) is the commander of Goobot's forces. He appears as the main antagonist in the PC version of Jimmy Neutron: Boy Genius. His mannerisms and appearance are reminiscent of Darth Vader.

==== Poultra ====
Poultra (vocal effects provided by Frank Welker) is a giant chicken-like monstrosity whom the Yolkians worship as a goddess. She only appears in the original film. Poultra reappears in the hour-long TV episode "The Eggpire Strikes Back", where King Goobot resurrects her in a clone body. Her name is a play on the word "poultry".

=== Professor Finbarr Calamitous ===
Professor Finbarr Calamitous (voiced by Tim Curry) is a mad scientist and Ms. Fowl's former student. He is Jimmy's nemesis and the main antagonist of the franchise. Professor Finbarr Calamitous was once a brilliant boy who could never finish anything, not even a sentence. The only thing he could finish was a robotic suit. He later overcomes his speech impediment, but still has a habit of not finishing his plans or not considering what to do after they are completed.

Calamitous also appears in the video games Nicktoons Unite! (2005) and Nicktoons: Attack of the Toybots (2007) where he battles Jimmy Neutron, Timmy Turner, Danny Phantom, SpongeBob SquarePants, and other Nicktoon characters.

In "The League of Villains", Calamitous is among the villains gathered by King Goobot V to assist in his revenge on Jimmy Neutron.

=== Beautiful Gorgeous ===
Beautiful Gorgeous (voiced by Wendie Malick) is an evil villain who is the daughter of Professor Calamitous. Her childhood dream was to become the person who "puts those little plastic things on the ends of shoelaces", but she was forced to be evil by her father, so they have a strained relationship with each other.

In "The League of Villains", Beautiful Gorgeous is among the villains gathered by King Goobot V to assist in his revenge on Jimmy Neutron. Thanks to one of Jimmy's inventions, Beautiful Gorgeous and Junkman fall in love, to the disgust of Professor Calamitous.

Beautiful Gorgeous appears as a playable character in the 2008 video game SpongeBob SquarePants Featuring Nicktoons: Globs of Doom.

=== Space Bandits ===
The Space Bandits are three reptilian aliens who Jimmy and his friends first encountered when mining for diamonds in space.

In "The League of Villains", the Space Bandits are among the villains recruited by King Goobot V to assist in his revenge on Jimmy Neutron. They later defect to Jimmy's side and are revealed to speak a reptilian language when they persuaded a Tyrannosaurus to go after Baby Eddie.

==== Zix ====
Zix (voiced by Maurice LaMarche) is the leader of the Space Bandits.

==== Travoltron ====
Travoltron (voiced by Jeff Bennett) is a member of the Space Bandits.

==== Tee ====
Tee (voiced by Kevin Michael Richardson) is the third Space Bandit. Tee enjoys hugging and dreams of opening a dress shop. Tee also hates it when people call him stupid, and though he was originally mute, he became known for exclaiming "Fool!" after his sentences when he was given spoken dialogue.

=== Nanobots ===
The Nanobots appeared in the episodes "Safety First", "Return of the Nanobots", and "Fundemonium". They consist of an orange large Nanobot named N-1 (voiced by Daran Norris) and a red thin Nanobot named N-2 (voiced by Tom Kenny).

=== Evil Jimmy Neutron ===
Evil Jimmy Neutron (voiced by Rob Paulsen) is one of several clones created by Jimmy to do his chores while he harvested moon rocks. The clones are frozen by Jimmy using ice crystals after they cause trouble, although Evil Jimmy escapes.

Evil Jimmy later returns in "The Trouble with Clones", in which Jimmy attempts to convert him into a nice person to have him do chores. Evil Jimmy creates an evil clone of Earth, causing the real Earth to disappear. The original Jimmy travels to the evil Earth and reverses the effects, with the cloned Earth and Evil Jimmy being sucked into the dark matter dimension.

=== Eustace Strytch ===
Eustace Strytch (voiced by Rob Paulsen) is a rich, snobby boy seen in "Billion Dollar Boy". He is the bitter rival of Jimmy, and has an extremely annoying laugh. After Eustace's adapting robot cat loses to Goddard, Strych finally puts his foot down towards Eustace after bonding with Hugh, grounds him, and has Blix take Eustace to his room.

In "The League of Villains", Eustace is among the villains gathered by King Goobot V to assist in his revenge on Jimmy Neutron.

==== Blix ====
Blix (voiced by Billy West) is the butler of the Strych family who shares his loyalties towards Eustace and Mr. Strych.

=== The Junkman ===
The Junkman (voiced by Charlie Adler) is a filthy alien who deals in fixing up and selling refuse products throughout the galaxy. He first appears in the second season, where he attempts to recycle Brobot's parents and sell their parts for profit.

In "The League of Villains", Junkman is among the villains recruited by King Goobot V to assist in his revenge on Jimmy Neutron. Due to one of Jimmy's inventions, Junkman falls in love with Beautiful Gorgeous much to the dismay of Professor Calamitous.

==== Roxy ====
Roxy (vocal effects provided by Frank Welker) is an alien resembling a two-tailed poodle who is Junkman's pet. She falls in love with Goddard, but hates Jimmy Neutron.

=== Twonkie ===
The Twonkies (vocal effects provided by Frank Welker) are small, puffball-like aliens who transform into vicious monsters when they hear music. The Twonkies can combine into a large monster that can only be subdued by Sheen's bad singing. Jimmy manages to capture most of the Twonkies and return them to the comet that they were originally found on. However, he fails to capture Sheen's Twonkie, which escapes and reproduces asexually. As a recurring gag, the Twonkie's offspring are seen throughout the rest of the series, but go unnoticed.

=== Meldar Prime ===
Meldar Prime (speaking voice by Tim Allen and singing voice provided by Jess Harnell) is the host of the TV show Intergalactic Showdown that appears in "Win, Lose, and Kaboom!".

=== Baby Eddie Neutron ===
Edward "Eddie" Neutron (voiced by Mark DeCarlo) is Jimmy's infant evil genius cousin and the son of Kari and Newt, who looks identical to Granny Neutron as an infant. Eddie believes that he is much smarter than Jimmy. He planted bombs inside gifts and a cake during a Neutron family reunion and birthday party in an attempt to kill the family and inherit their money, making sure that Jimmy would be blamed for a crime that he had not committed. His plan was foiled and his motive was exposed leading to Eddie being taken away by his mother".

In "The League of Villains", Eddie is among the villains gathered by Goobot V to assist in his revenge on Jimmy Neutron.

=== Grandma Taters ===
Grandma Taters (voiced by Edie McClurg) is a sweet-seeming old lady who is actually a hostile alien. Through a television series starring herself, she tried to hypnotize the citizens of Retroville into behaving as cheerful zombies. In "The League of Villains", Taters is among the villains gathered by King Goobot V.

=== Buford Lee Stormshuckle ===
Buford Lee Stormshuckle (voiced by Bill Farmer) is the Southern American prison warden of a correctional facility who frames Jimmy for a bank heist. When Sheen and Carl unsuccessfully try to free Jimmy, he arrests them too. However, Jimmy and his friends escape from prison, with Stormshuckle putting out a $10,000 reward for their capture. Stormshuckle is fired from his job and arrested after Jimmy proves to the police that Stormshuckle was the real bank robber.

=== Dr. Sydney Orville Moist ===
Dr. Sydney Orville Moist (voiced by Jeff Bennett) is a paranoid dance-crazy scientist who works in a secret underwater lair in the Bahama Quadrangle, making evil henchmen out of algae.

=== Shirley ===
Shirley (voiced by Jeff Garlin) is a villain created by Jimmy Neutron and Timmy Turner in The Jimmy Timmy Power Hour 3: The Jerkinators. He is created out of boredom of defeating the same, easy villains in the hopes of having a more difficult, challenging one to fight. Although he is the main villain of the movie, he at first acts humble, polite, and even dimwitted. It is only when Jimmy and Timmy abandon him at a mall that he becomes evil.

== Other ==
=== April ===
April (voiced by Alyssa Milano) is a Gorlock, a race of alien creatures that have green skin and tusks. The Gorlocks are one of four participating groups on Intergalactic Showdown; they usually win challenges with the use of brute strength and force. In fear of her planet's safety, April performs a seal of trust with Jimmy which resembled a kiss. After the Intergalactic Showdown ends, Jimmy and April remain in contact. April's real name is Chee Aaaaaaaaaah Doik, but she hates this name and threatens anyone who calls her by it.

=== Sagebrush Sally ===
Sagebrush Sally (voiced by Grey Griffin) is a cowgirl that appears in the episode "Foul Bull". She performs amazing horseback riding tricks and Jimmy, Carl, and Sheen instantly develop a crush on her. To prove themselves worthy of Sally's heart, they each set out to master a specific rodeo talent which briefly impresses her, but when the real cowpoke is revealed to be none other than Ms. Fowl, she gets angry at Jimmy, Carl, and Sheen for lying and decides to hang out with Libby and Cindy, leaving them confused, though they quickly get over it as they guess that this might be why they don’t like girls so they decide to forget all about them and leave.

=== VOX ===
VOX (voiced by Megan Cavanagh) is Jimmy's computer. She is rarely heard in later seasons.

=== Elke Elkberg ===
Elke Elkberg (voiced by Grey Griffin) is Carl's Swedish pen pal, female counterpart and love interest in "Carl Wheezer, Boy Genius." She originally claims to be a really famous person, but she confesses later to be a simple girl. However, as it turns out, she and Carl share the same obsessive love for llamas, and they start dating.

=== Mayor Quador ===
Mayor Quador (voiced by Mark DeCarlo in "Normal Boy" and Jim Cummings in later episodes) is the Mayor of Retroville. He is modeled after Clark Gable.

=== Coach Gruber ===
Coach Gruber (voiced by Jim Belushi) is the gym teacher at Lindbergh Elementary School.

=== Hilgo ===
Hilgo (voiced by Megan Cavanagh) is a muscular Russian woman who appeared in different roles.

In "Time is Money", Hilgo appeared as the Neutron family's maid after Jimmy persuaded Hugh's past counterpart to make a wise investment.

In "Nightmare in Retroville", Hilgo was part of an angry mob assembled by Sam and Ms. Fowl.

In "Return of the Nanobots", Hilgo appeared as a lunch lady at Lindbergh Elementary School.

=== Officer Tubbs ===
Officer Tubbs (voiced by Frank Welker in most episodes and Rob Paulsen in "The Great Egg Heist") is a police officer who is not very bright. In some episodes, he would often be seen arresting the bad guys that Jimmy defeats.

=== Cap'n Betty ===
Cap'n Betty (voiced by Jim Cummings) is an odd sailor who knows about a monster that Jimmy is trying to reveal to be false. He appears in "Monster Hunt", "My Big Fat Spy Wedding", and has numerous cameos throughout the series, many of them well-hidden. He is a parody of Quint from Jaws.

=== Commander Baker ===
Commander Baker (voiced by Michael Clarke Duncan) is an African American who is the Big Top Secret Organization commander.

=== Ernest Abercrombie ===
Ernest Abercrombie (voiced by Mark DeCarlo) is a military general who appears in two episodes and the film. In the film, he appears briefly when the military notices Jimmy's rocket. In the first season, he is shown as having a lack of knowledge about the military as Retroville faces the threat of Miss Fowl, who has become an overgrown monster, inadvertently because of Jimmy. His second appearance occurs in the third season, when he detains Jimmy and his friends after they obtain superhero powers and are mistaken by Retroville citizens as mutants.

=== Flippy ===
Flippy (voiced by Mark DeCarlo) is Hugh's dummy and a semi-villain. He was used as firewood to ward off the Twonkies in the season-three premiere episode, "Attack of the Twonkies". He also appears in "Flippy".

=== Hank McSpanky ===
Hank McSpanky is the founder of a chain of fast food restaurants called McSpanky's. It is said that he is Scottish. He once met Jimmy's father, with whom he almost went into business.

=== Professor Crank ===
Professor Crank (voiced by Dan Castellaneta) appears in the episode "Operation: Rescue Jet Fusion".

=== Neutron family relatives ===
The following are the relatives of the Neutron family:

==== Amanda Neutron ====
Amanda Neutron (voiced by Tress MacNeille) is Jimmy's wealthy great-aunt and Hugh's aunt. Amanda originally hates Jimmy because he "brings danger to the town". She reconciled with him after he revealed his baby cousin Eddie's evil plan to harm the family. Amanda appears only in the 2005 episode "Clash of the Cousins".

==== Kari Neutron ====
Kari Neutron (voiced by Tress MacNeille) is Jimmy's aunt, Hugh's sister, Newt's wife, and Baby Eddie's mother. Like the rest of Jimmy's cousins and aunts, she hates him for "nearly destroying the town". She was completely horrified and fainted when Jimmy attacked Baby Eddie. When she woke up, she was shocked to discover her baby speaking full sentences. Kari reconciles with Jimmy and apologizes to him and his parents for little Eddie trying to destroy them all. Kari then took Eddie away to deal with him. She appears only in the episode "Clash of the Cousins".

==== Annabelle Neutron ====
Annabelle Neutron (voiced by Tress MacNeille) is Jimmy's paranoid, insane, and brown-haired cousin. She suffers from many phobias. This was evident when Carl touched and talked to her when she was sorting toothpicks.

==== Gomer Neutron ====
Gomer Neutron (voiced by Mark DeCarlo) is Jimmy's cousin on Hugh's side who is extremely stupid and plays ping pong with a ball that is covered in saliva and is known as his "spit ball". Unlike the other relatives, Gomer has no issues against Jimmy. Gomer appears only in "Clash of The Cousins".

==== Granny Neutron ====
Granny Neutron (voiced by Phyllis Diller) is Hugh's mother and Jimmy's paternal grandmother. Jimmy once turned her into a baby in "Granny Baby".

==== Newt Neutron ====
Newton "Newt" Neutron (voiced by Mark DeCarlo) is Jimmy's uncle, Kari's husband, Hugh's brother-in-law, and a seemingly, mild-mannered, semi middle aged man who is Eddie's father. Like Jimmy's other cousins and aunts, he hates Jimmy for nearly destroying the town.

Newton is modeled after Keith Alcorn.
