= Jeff Garcia (comedian) =

American comedian and actor (1975–2025)

- Born: Jeffrey Garcia; May 3, 1975; La Puente, California, U.S.
- Died: December 10, 2025 (aged 50); Los Angeles, California, U.S.
- Occupations: Stand-up comedian; actor
- Spouse: Lisa Garcia (m. 2002; div. 2013)
- Children: 2

Comedy career
- Years active: 1991–2025
- Medium: Stand-up; film; television
- Genres: Observational comedy; topical humor; character comedy; improvisational comedy

YouTube information
- Channel: Jeff Garcia Comedy
- Years active: 2020–2025
- Genre: Stand-up comedy
- Subscribers: 11.5 thousand
- Views: 3 million

Jeffrey Garcia (May 3, 1975 – December 10, 2025) was an American stand-up comedian and actor. In animation, he voiced Sheen Estevez in Jimmy Neutron: Boy Genius as well as its two Nickelodeon spin-off television show series—The Adventures of Jimmy Neutron, Boy Genius and Planet Sheen—along with Pip the Mouse in Barnyard and its spin-off television show series Back at the Barnyard.

== Early life ==
Jeffrey Garcia was born on May 3, 1975 in La Puente, California.

== Career ==
He began his stand-up comedy career in 1991, performing stand-up at various comedy clubs in Southern California and the Laugh Factory for several years.

As a voice actor, he was known for portraying Sheen Estevez in Jimmy Neutron: Boy Genius and its spin-off series The Adventures of Jimmy Neutron, Boy Genius and Planet Sheen on Nickelodeon. He also guest-starred on the animated series Clone High. He was also the leader of the KMRK-FM 96.1 Wild Wake-Up crew. He also voiced Tyler Nelson in The Maw franchise and Pip the mouse in the 2006 film Barnyard, reprising his role as Pip in the television spin-off Back at the Barnyard. He voiced Rinaldo the penguin in the 2006 film Happy Feet.

Garcia appeared on the half-hour comedy special Comedy Central Presents in May 2006. He was a contestant on the Comedy Central series Reality Bites Back, but quit after the first day. He also voiced Tipa, one of the smugglers and the bat, in the 2011 animated comedy film Rio. In the sequel Rio 2, he voiced a spoonbill and an auditioning Spix's macaw named Peri.

== Personal life ==
Garcia was married to Lisa Garcia from 2002 to 2013; together they had two children: Savannah and Joseph Garcia. Garcia was involved with Gracie's Fund, a charity set up to help a young woman who was shot by her mother. He promoted the fund by performing comedy shows and donated a portion of the proceeds of his online DVD and CD sales.

=== Illness and death ===
In the months leading up to his death, Garcia's health declined, causing him to cancel several performances. In mid-2025, Garcia suffered a brain aneurysm, causing him to collapse and hit his head. A few weeks before his death, Garcia suffered a stroke; he was hospitalized for pneumonia on November 20. On December 8, Garcia was hospitalized again, but his lung collapsed after a day of recovery, placing him on life support. He died on December 10, aged 50. (Note: Attributed to multiple sources:)

== Filmography ==
=== Live-action ===
==== Film ====
Year	Title	Role	Notes
1995	Best of Comedy Live	Himself	
1998	LiteWeight	Oscar	
2000	Cursed Part 3		Short film
2000	3 Strikes	Valet	
2003	Latin Comedy Fiesta Volume 1	Himself	Host
2007	Payaso Comedy Slam	Himself	Comedy special
2024	Holy Cash	Jeff Sinner	

==== Television ====
Year	Title	Role	Notes
1995	Caroline in the City	Jeff	Episode: "Caroline and the Mugger"
1995	Dangerous Minds	Raoul	2 episodes
2012–2013	Mr. Box Office	Freddy Lopez	33 episodes

=== Voice roles ===
==== Film ====
Year	Title	Role	Notes
2001	Jimmy Neutron: Boy Genius	Sheen Estevez	
2006	Barnyard	Pip	
2006	Happy Feet	Rinaldo	
2010	Marmaduke	Beach Dog #3	
2011	Rio	Tipa and Bat	
2011	Happy Feet Two	Rinaldo	
2014	Rio 2	Spoonbill, Peri (Auditioning blue Spix's macaw)	

==== Television ====
Year	Title	Role	Notes
2002	ChalkZone	Jerry Rivera	Episode: "Indecent Exposure/My Big Fat Chalk Wedding/Rap-A-Present/Greetings from Greenland"
2002	Clone High	Jesús Cristo	Episode: "A.D.D.: The Last 'D' Is for Disorder"
2002–2006	The Adventures of Jimmy Neutron, Boy Genius	Sheen Estevez, additional voices	Series regular
2003	Ozzy & Drix	Ricardo Amino	Episode: "Tricky Ricardo"
2004	The Jimmy Timmy Power Hour	Sheen Estevez	Crossover TV film
2004	The Adventures of Jimmy Neutron, Boy Genius: Win, Lose and Kaboom!	Sheen Estevez	TV movie
2005	Jimmy Neutron: Attack of the Twonkies	Sheen Estevez	TV special
2005	The Proud Family	Tookie Thomas	Episode: "Who You Calling a Sissy?"
2006	The Jimmy Timmy Power Hour 2: When Nerds Collide	Sheen Estevez, Anti Fairy Walla	Crossover TV film
2006	The Jimmy Timmy Power Hour 3: The Jerkinators!	Sheen Estevez	Crossover TV film
2007–2011	Back at the Barnyard	Pip, additional voices	
2010–2013	Planet Sheen	Sheen Estevez, additional voices	

==== Video games ====
Year	Title	Role	Notes
2001	Jimmy Neutron: Boy Genius	Sheen Estevez	PC Version
2002	Jimmy Neutron vs. Jimmy Negatron	Sheen Estevez	
2002	Jimmy Neutron: Boy Genius	Sheen Estevez, Miners	PS2 Version
2003	The Adventures of Jimmy Neutron Boy Genius: Jet Fusion	Sheen Estevez, Racing Ninja, Pirate	
2003	Nickelodeon Toon Twister 3D	Sheen Estevez	
2004	The Adventures of Jimmy Neutron Boy Genius: Attack of the Twonkies	Sheen Estevez	
2006	Happy Feet	Rinaldo	
2006	Barnyard	Pip	
2006	Marc Ecko's Getting Up: Contents Under Pressure	Spleen	
2008	SpongeBob SquarePants Featuring Nicktoons: Globs of Doom	Sheen Estevez	
2011	Nicktoons MLB	Sheen Estevez	
2025	Nicktoons & The Dice of Destiny	Sheen Estevez	Final voice role

== Awards and nominations ==
- 2004 - Annie Award for Outstanding Voice Acting in an Animated Television Production - Won
