= True Vibe =

American boy band

- Also known as: TRUEvibe
- Genres: Pop; contemporary Christian music; dance-pop; teen pop
- Years active: 1999–2003
- Label: Essential
- Past members: Jonathan Lippmann; Nathan Gaddis; Jason Barton; Jordan Roe
- Website: truevibe.com

True Vibe was a CCM group that was active from 1999 to 2003. Composed of members Jonathan Lippmann, Nathan Gaddis, Jason Barton, and Jordan Roe, the group was born out of Lippmann's desire to pursue musical excellence without watering down his Christian faith.

== Biography ==
Jonathan Lippmann left 98 Degrees just before they signed a recording contract; he had already signed on to several roles as an actor, but also found himself somewhat uncomfortable with his understanding of religion. After performing on Sweet Valley High and doing commercials for Burger King, Lippmann formed True Vibe in Nashville, Tennessee, and signed with Essential Records. The group released two albums on Essential.

The second album (See The Light) was Grammy-nominated for Best Pop/Contemporary Christian Album. Sometime in 2003, the group parted ways. Jonathan Lippmann told a Christian magazine that he thought about replacing the other three guys but decided against it.

They may be best known to mainstream audiences for appearing on the title track to NSYNC members' Lance Bass and Joey Fatone's film, On the Line. They also toured with Destiny’s Child and Aaron Carter. They’ve had songs featured on Radio Disney and WOW music compilations as well.

True Vibe performed on the Late Show with David Letterman and are featured on the Jimmy Neutron soundtrack.

Their most popular songs were Jump, Jump, Jump, Now and Forever, You Are the Way, Sweet Jesus, and See the Light

Member Jason Barton, still residing in Tennessee, later became lead singer of the band 33Miles.

Member Nathan Gaddis, residing now in the Tampa Bay Area, was a Worship Pastor for 18 years, and now owns a small business that partners with hundreds of churches around the country to help with Digital Outreach Strategies, called D373 (https://d373.com). He is a keynote speaker at conferences and events as one of the leading voices in church communications. He also still travels as a worship leader.

Member Jordan Roe is the founder and lead pastor of Mission Community Church (https://www.mymissioncc.com/) in Fort Myers, FL.

Previous members included Chad Jarnagin, Terry Fritch, and Scott Pyper, who all left the group just before signing a recording contract.

== Discography ==
- True Vibe (Essential Records, released May 2001.)
  - Charts: US Billboard 200 #178, US Contemporary Christian #10.
  - The album spent 16 weeks on the charts and spawned a Radio Disney hit with "Jump, Jump, Jump" and a Christian radio hit with the single, "You Are The Way".
- See the Light (Essential, released July 2002.)
  - Charts: US Contemporary Christian #22.
  - This album was Grammy-nominated for Best Pop/Contemporary Christian Album of the Year.
