= Messiah (software) =

3D animation software

- Developers: pmG Worldwide, LLC
- Release: January 2000; 26 years ago
- Stable release: 6.0 / April 1, 2013; 13 years ago
- Operating system: Windows 2000 and later
- Type: 3D computer graphics.
- License: Trialware
- Website: projectmessiah.com/x6

Messiah (also known as messiah:studio) is a 3D animation and rendering application developed by pmG Worldwide. It runs on the Win32 and Win64 platforms. It is marketed to run on Mac OS X and Linux via Wine. Messiah's fourth version, messiah:studio was released April 2009 and version 5.5b as messiah:animate was released November 2006. messiahStudio6 was released in April 2013. Messiah seems no longer maintained since 2013 (abandoned).

== Early history and releases ==
Messiah was developed as a commercial plugin for Lightwave 5.5 to 7.5, by principal programmers Fori Owurowa, Dan Milling and Lyle Milton. In 2000, pmG released messiah:animate; a stand-alone application that provided animators with an advanced rigging and animation toolset geared towards the animation of complex organic characters and shapes. This new package offered an Animation Host Connection which allowed users to transfer animation data into a variety of packages including Cinema4D, Lightwave, 3D Studio Max, Softimage 3D and Alias Maya.

In 2001, pmG announced messiah:studio, a stand-alone package comprising messiah:animate and messiah:render, boasting numerous animation enhancements coupled with an all new render engine. Previously, messiah:studio stored license information on a HASP hardware dongle, but now stores license information on a USB stick.

== Core features ==
=== Interface ===
- Speed - Messiah has OpenGL playback and real-time previewing of fully subdivided models, particle systems and dynamics objects.
- Flexibility - Messiah offers modular interoperability with many major packages, allowing users to make animation modifications in either messiah:studio or a host program and see instant feedback and updates in the other package.

=== Animation ===
Messiah:studio offers a realtime full motion and deformation-based character animation toolset. Features include:

- Setup - Messiah's setup mode allows for non-destructive animated character modifications. This means a character's rigging setup can be edited even after it has been fully animated.
- Skeleton and deformation - Creating bones is a "point and click" operation and the bones can be modified interactively. Weighting eliminating the need for direct weighting. Muscle Bones are possible in Messiah with a single click, providing squash and stretch on arms, legs, bodies, tails and tentacles.
- Hierarchical expressions - Messiah offers a mathematical expression system. Messiah's expressions system allow automation of existing animation, control over morphs, dynamic parenting and more.
- Armatures - Messiah's Armature system provides a visual method for creating character and program control. Armatures can be used for anything from stick figure animation and facial animation controls, to character selection sheets and command interfaces.
- Animate immediate - Messiah's Animate Immediate mode allows feedback and manipulation during object selection and transformation by combining individual mouse clicks for selection and then movement into one fluid motion.

Messiah 3.0 also introduced a built-in nonlinear animation editor, Compose, which let animators organize motion as reusable clips and sequence or blend those clips.

=== Rendering ===
Messiah:studio includes messiah:render, a hybrid scanline/raytracing render engine. Messiah also allows for the output of .rib files for use with RenderMan and offers network rendering via the ButterflyNetRender (BNR). Features of messiah render include:

- Nodal-based shader editor system for applying shaders and texture maps to models. Animation control of parameters is available through messiah's expression system.
- Multithreaded 64 bit rendering, supporting multiple core processors.
- Subpoly displacement, allowing for high detail displacement mapping of models using data from programs such as Zbrush. With field weighting tools, displacement effects can be animated.
- Particle rendering
- Subsurface scattering, for skin and fluid effects.
- Global illumination, using Monte Carlo, Photon and hybrid systems.
- HDRI lighting
- Translucency
- Per-surface light exclusion
- Light materials, making it possible for models to be used for diffusion and emission of light
- Soft shadows, with full control of samples.
- Area lights
- Volumetric lighting
- Shadow mapping
- Caustics

=== Import and export ===
Whilst messiah:studio offers no native modelling tools it is capable of exporting and importing many common 3d filetypes, such as .3ds, .lwo, and .obj. Messiah can import and export motion capture, via .bvh files, and can transfer datasets using the host API suite. It also provides native support for .mdd files, for use with the Point Oven program.

On 17 April 2008, pmG released the source code and SDK for the Host Connections plugins, so that users could update and adapt the connections software and plugin files for external programs.

== Uses ==
=== Films ===
Messiah has been used for character animation and the creation of VFX shots in several feature films and shorts, including Ghost Rider, Harry Potter, Hellboy, Into the Deep, Jimmy Neutron: Boy Genius, Syriana, The Triplets of Belleville, X-Men, and Zambezia.

=== Television ===
Messiah has been used in television productions, including The Adventures of Jimmy Neutron: Boy Genius, Robbie the Reindeer, Andy's Airplanes and Plankton Invasion, as well as station IDs and commercials.
