= Planet Sheen =

American animated science fiction comedy television series

- Also known as: Red Acres (original working title)
- Genre: Science fiction comedy; Science fantasy; Slapstick; Space adventure
- Created by: Keith Alcorn; Steve Oedekerk
- Based on: Jimmy Neutron: Boy Genius by John Davis
- Developed by: Steven Banks
- Voices of: Jeff Garcia; Bob Joles; Rob Paulsen; Soleil Moon Frye; Jeff Bennett; Fred Tatasciore; Thomas Lennon; Candi Milo
- Composer: Michael Tavera
- Country of origin: United States
- Original language: English
- No. of seasons: 1
- No. of episodes: 26 (50 segments)

Production
- Executive producers: Keith Alcorn; Steve Oedekerk
- Producer: Paul Marshal
- Running time: 11 minutes (short-length episodes only); 22 minutes (long-length specials only)
- Production companies: Omation Animation Studio; Nickelodeon Animation Studios

Original release
- Network: Nickelodeon
- Release: October 2, 2010 – August 18, 2011
- Network: Nicktoons
- Release: May 4, 2012 – February 15, 2013

Related
- The Adventures of Jimmy Neutron, Boy Genius (2002–06)

Planet Sheen is an American animated science fiction comedy television series created by Keith Alcorn and Steve Oedekerk. It is a spin-off of the Jimmy Neutron franchise, the second sequel television series of the film Jimmy Neutron: Boy Genius, and also its sequel to the television series The Adventures of Jimmy Neutron, Boy Genius. The series was picked up for 26 episodes by Nickelodeon for its only season. Jeffrey Garcia returns as the voice of Sheen, and Bob Joles and Rob Paulsen are the voices of Nesmith and Doppy. The series was originally animated by C.O.R.E. in Toronto, but animation production moved to Bardel Entertainment in Vancouver after C.O.R.E closed down. At that time, Chris Neuhahn took over as Supervising Producer. Planet Sheen premiered on Nickelodeon on October 2, 2010 (along with T.U.F.F. Puppy, which premiered a half hour later) in the United States, and then aired its final episode on Nicktoons on February 15, 2013.

This show was the final animated project in the franchise to feature Garcia as Sheen prior to his death on December 10, 2025, and for the final time was in the 2025 video game Nicktoons & The Dice of Destiny.

== Plot ==
One day, after sneaking into Jimmy's laboratory and finding his new rocket ship, Sheen accidentally blasts himself into outer space when he disobeys Jimmy's warning note, "Sheen, do not push this button." After soaring through the cosmos for an unspecified amount of time, Sheen eventually crashes onto a distant alien planet four million and one light-years away from Earth known as "Zeenu" where he meets the planet's emperor, who firmly believes Sheen is a supernatural creature that will bring joy.

Much of the show is centered around Sheen fixing his rocket so he could go home, working for the Emperor as his new supreme royal adviser, and annoying an evil sorcerer named Dorkus with his antics and wild destruction. Furious that Sheen not only destroyed his home when he first arrived on the planet but also took his job from him, Dorkus and his minion Pinter scheme to destroy him but fail at every turn.

While on Zeenu, Sheen makes many new friends, some of which include: Doppy Doppweiler, a green slug-like creature who resembles Sheen's friend Carl; Nesmith, an intelligent chimpanzee from Earth who excels in subjects such as math and engineering; the Emperor's daughter Princess Oomlout, who develops a crush on Sheen that he does not appreciate; Aseefa, a girl who becomes Sheen's crush and knows how to yodel; and Chock Chock, Aseefa's pet Choctow who's regarded as the most feared and dangerous creature on Zeenu.

== Production ==
During production of The Adventures of Jimmy Neutron, Boy Genius, much of DNA Productions staff were pitching new titles for development when Jimmy Neutron would eventually end. From this, Keith Alcorn and Mike Gasaway developed "Red Acres", which was set to be a CGI series about an adult astronaut who finds a planet filled with dimwitted aliens. The two (alongside Ben Gilberg) pitched the idea to Nickelodeon (at their parent company Viacom's headquarters in New York City), who reportedly loved the concept, yet refused to greenlight it on the stance of it breaking the network's rule of the main character being a child (or anthropomorphic animal). They then subsequently pitched the idea to Kids' WB, Cartoon Network, and Disney, yet got rejected each time.

They then redeveloped their main character so that instead of focusing on an adult, they focus on Carl and Sheen from Jimmy Neutron. However, after presenting their idea, a Nickelodeon executive said that the series should focus just on Sheen. Though it was hard for the team to fully accept, they reached a compromise by introducing an alien character who resembled and acted like Carl.

After pitching the idea to Nickelodeon Animation in LA, it was put into immediate development, with Steven Banks joining the crew to help develop the show even further.

== Broadcast ==
Planet Sheen premiered in the United States on Nickelodeon on October 2, 2010, and continued to air there until August 18, 2011. The series was moved to Nicktoons on May 4, 2012, to air the remaining episodes until February 15, 2013. Planet Sheen continued to air reruns on Nicktoons until May 5, 2015. Nickelodeon Canada aired a sneak peek of the series on January 2, 2011, which was followed by an official premiere on January 5, 2011. On July 21, 2011, the series debuted in Australia and New Zealand on Nickelodeon. Planet Sheen also aired on Nickelodeon in the UK and Ireland, with a sneak peek on May 2, 2011, and an official premiere aired on June 6, 2011.

== Episodes ==
No.	Title	Directed by	Written by	Original release date	Prod. code	U.S. viewers (millions)
Nickelodeon
1	"Planet Sheen"	Mike Gasaway and Todd Grimes	Jim Hope and Steven Banks	October 2, 2010	101	3.54
Note: Special double-length episode and lacks the official name of the series. Otis and Pig from Barnyard make non-speaking cameos in Sheen's flashback.
2a	"Is This Cute?"	Mike Gasaway	Jim Hope and Steven Banks	October 9, 2010	102a	N/A
Boh-Rok the Destroyer, who is considered the most powerful being on Zeenu, visits the Zeenuians. Beforehand, the Emperor wants Sheen to be prepared for the visit, but Dorkus tries to sabotage Sheen. Chaos ensues.
2b	"The Boy Next Dorkus"	Keith Alcorn and Mike Gasaway	Jim Hope, Sean Presant, and Allen Jay Zipper	October 9, 2010	102b	N/A
Both Sheen and Dorkus host parties at their houses. The Zeenuians choose to go to Sheen's party. This enrages Dorkus, and he seeks revenge.
3a	"What's Up Chock?"	Bert Ring	Jim Hope, Sean Presant, and Allen Jay Zipper	October 16, 2010	103a	N/A
3b	"Joust Friends"	Keith Alcorn and Mike Gasaway	Jim Hope, Sean Presant, and Allen Jay Zipper	October 16, 2010	103b	N/A
Princess Oom's ex-boyfriend, "Grish the Beautiful", is jealous of her crush on Sheen. Grish challenges Sheen to a battle to fight for her. Sheen attempts to avoid battling him.
4a	"Torzilla"	Mike Gasaway	Jim Hope, Sean Presant, and Allen Jay Zipper	October 23, 2010	106b	4.24
Sheen misses the kinds of food he ate on Earth, so he tries to grow some Earth food. When he tries to grow tortillas, he inadvertently grows a tortilla monster. Sheen and his friends need to stop it from causing trouble.
4b	"There's Something About Scary"	Jeff Allen	Jim Hope, Sean Presant, and Allen Jay Zipper	October 23, 2010	105b	4.24
Aseefa shows Sheen her scary face. However, Princess Oom happens to see it too and is terrified. Later, she is caught making the scary face again, and the Emperor locks her away. The Emperor also starts to imprison other Zeenuians that accidentally make a scary face. Sheen has to rescue them.
5a	"Keeping Up with the Gronzes"	Tom Morgan	Jim Hope, Sean Presant, and Allen Jay Zipper	November 13, 2010	106a	N/A
5b	"Thanksgetting"	T.J. Sullivan	Jim Hope, Sean Presant, and Allen Jay Zipper	November 13, 2010	105a	N/A
Sheen invents a holiday called Thanksgetting, and it involves everyone giving Sheen gifts without anything in return. This ends up backfiring on him.
6a	"Cutting the Ultra-Cord"	Mike Gasaway	Jim Hope, Sean Presant, and Allen Jay Zipper	November 28, 2010	107a	N/A
Sheen is acting strangely, and Nesmith and Doppy are worried about him. Dorkus says that spending time with a Fusterbeest, a ferocious dinosaur-like creature, will help him.
6b	"Trial by Jerry"	Mike Gasaway	Jim Hope, Sean Presant, and Allen Jay Zipper	November 28, 2010	107b	N/A
The Emperor accuses Nesmith of eating his pet. As a result, a trial is held. Sheen defends Nesmith, and he tries to prove his innocence.
7a	"Act I, Sheen I"	Mike Gasaway and Todd Grimes	Jim Hope, Sean Presant, and Allen Jay Zipper	November 28, 2010	108a	N/A
Dorkus notices Sheen's crush on Aseefa. Dorkus then gets the idea to create a play for both of them to star in. Dorkus sets up traps for Sheen on the stage.
7b	"Money Suits Sheen"	Jeff Allen	Jim Hope, Sean Presant, and Allen Jay Zipper	November 28, 2010	108b	N/A
Sheen wants to build a money suit, similar to the one the Emperor wears in this episode. Sheen makes money by selling a fake item called the "perma-hap", and he says it will make users permanently happy. However, trouble arises later when the customers visit Sheen to receive the product.
8a	"Chock Around the Clock"	Mike Gasaway and Todd Grimes	Keith Alcorn	February 12, 2011	109a	N/A
Sheen watches Aseefa's pet Chocktow, "Chock Chock", while she is away. However, her pet is inadvertently taken by animal control. Then Sheen and his friends must rescue him before Aseefa comes back.
8b	"The Oomlick Maneuver"	Jeff Allen	Jim Hope, Sean Presant, and Allen Jay Zipper	February 12, 2011	109b	N/A
Sheen is tired of dealing with Princess Oom, so Sheen tries to get Oom to date her ex-boyfriend Grish. Sheen tries to make Grish more like himself.
9a	"Ooze on First"	Mike Gasaway and Todd Grimes	Sindy Boveda-Spackman	February 26, 2011	114a	N/A
Sheen teaches Zeenu about baseball, and then a baseball game is held. Dorkus wants to beat Sheen in the game. Meanwhile, an asteroid is hurtling toward Zeenu.
9b	"Monster Fighting Combat Strike Force"	Mike Gasaway and Todd Grimes	Jim Hope, Sean Presant, and Allen Jay Zipper	February 26, 2011	114b	N/A
There is a Gwaltney outbreak in Zeenu, and the Emperor puts Sheen and Doppy in charge of stopping them. Sheen distracts the creatures while Doppy makes them slip with his slime. However, Doppy's parents discover this, and they are worried for Doppy's safety.
10a	"To Chill a Mocking Blurg"	Jeff Allen	Jim Hope, Sean Presant, and Allen Jay Zipper	August 17, 2011	111a	N/A
The Royal Ball of Compliments event is held. Dorkus decides to release a Mocking Blurg, a bird-like creature, into the event to make Sheen look bad. More Mocking Blurgs arrive, and they mock and insult the Zeenuians at the event. Sheen must find a way to stop them.
10b	"Now You Sheen It"	Mike Gasaway and Todd Grimes	Jim Hope, Sean Presant, and Allen Jay Zipper	August 17, 2011	111b	N/A
Sheen performs a magic show. Sheen is able to perform magical effects by combining certain ship parts from Nesmith's rocket repair. However, unexpected problems occur during the magic show.
11a	"Desperate Houseguests"	Jeff Allen	Jim Hope, Sean Presant, and Allen Jay Zipper	August 18, 2011	112a	N/A
Sheen helps Doppy and his parents (Mr. and Mrs. Doppweiller) remove a mysterious monster from their home. Dorkus says that his potion will help calm the monster.
11b	"Nesvidanya"	Tom Morgan	Jim Hope, Sean Presant, and Allen Jay Zipper	August 18, 2011	112b	N/A
The Emperor asks Sheen to show him proof of the mythical, white-haired Boopenfoofer's existence. During their search, the creature takes Nesmith. Sheen has to save him and solve the mystery behind the creature.
Nicktoons
12a	"ExpreSheenism"	Jeff Allen and Chad Van De Keere	Jim Hope, Sean Presant, and Allen Jay Zipper	May 4, 2012	115a	N/A
12b	"Gotta Go"	Francisco Avalos	Jim Hope, Sean Presant, and Allen Jay Zipper	May 4, 2012	115b	N/A
While Sheen is hanging out with Aseefa, he has to use the restroom. He goes to great lengths to keep her from finding out. Sheen has trouble finding a place to use the restroom in this situation.
13a	"Sheen Racer"	Chad Van De Keere	Sindy Boveda-Spackman	May 11, 2012	116a	N/A
Sheen enters a race against other Zeenuians, and he teams up with Doppy. Dorkus and Pinter also enter the race, and they try to cheat and sabotage Sheen.
13b	"QuaranSheen"	Francisco Avalos, Mike Gasaway, and Todd Grimes	Jim Hope, Sean Presant, and Allen Jay Zipper	May 11, 2012	116b	N/A
Sheen pretends he is sick so he doesn't have to deal with Princess Oom at a dance. Sheen says he has "dance fever," and he says it is a sickness that causes him to dance badly. However, other Zeenuians start to believe that the sickness is spreading to them too. Anyone who has symptoms is locked away in quarantine.
14a	"Washing My Sheen"	Jeff Allen	Jim Hope, Sean Presant, and Allen Jay Zipper	May 18, 2012	110a	N/A
Sheen decides to not bathe anymore. He convinces other Zeenuians to stop bathing as well. However, this gets the attention of dirt-loving creatures.
14b	"Stuck in the Riddle with You"	Ken Mitchroney	Jim Hope, Sean Presant, and Allen Jay Zipper	May 18, 2012	110b	N/A
A Brain Flower appears and challenges Zeenuians to a battle of intelligence. He threatens to eat the participants if they do not answer his questions correctly. Sheen and his friends must stop him.
15a	"He Went Hataway"	Chad Van De Keere	Sindy Boveda-Spackman	May 25, 2012	118a	N/A
Nesmith's hat has gone missing. Sheen acts like a detective to find the hat.
15b	"Tongue-Tied"	Francisco Avalos	Jim Hope, Sean Presant, and Allen Jay Zipper	May 25, 2012	118b	N/A
Sheen gets stuck to Princess Oom's tongue. Sheen and Oom have to figure out how to free themselves.
16a	"A Well Oiled Fighting Ma-Sheen"	Craig George	John Morey	June 8, 2012	119a	N/A
The Emperor has Sheen help his guards prepare for the appearance of a creature called the Londar.
16b	"Dorkus in Chains"	Ian Freedman	Jim Hope, Sean Presant, and Allen Jay Zipper	June 8, 2012	119b	N/A
Sheen and Dorkus become inadvertently chained together. They are also stuck underground. Sheen and Dorkus are forced to work together to escape.
17a	"Sheen Says"	Jeff Allen	Jim Hope, Sean Presant, and Allen Jay Zipper	September 7, 2012	113a	N/A
Sheen is temporarily put in charge when the Emperor leaves.
17b	"Hippocratic Oaf"	Mike Gasaway and Todd Grimes	Jim Hope, Sean Presant, and Allen Jay Zipper	September 7, 2012	113b	N/A
Sheen opens his own clinic on Zeenu and acts like a doctor.
18a	"Scape Doat"	Craig George	Jim Hope, Sean Presant, and Allen Jay Zipper	September 14, 2012	120a	N/A
Sheen accidentally breaks Mr. and Mrs. Doppweiler's figurine. Sheen blames Nesmith, and Nesmith works for the Doppweilers to pay for the damages. Sheen and Doppy then try to get a replacement figurine.
18b	"Haute CuiSheen"	Ian Freedman	Jim Hope, Sean Presant, and Allen Jay Zipper	September 14, 2012	120b	N/A
Sheen opens an Earth food restaurant.
19a	"Raging Belle"	Chad Van De Keere	Jim Hope, Sean Presant, and Allen Jay Zipper	September 21, 2012	122a	N/A
Aseefa asks Sheen to help her with her Tahlak Pow (a night where she turns into a violent monster).
19b	"Breath Wish"	Francisco Avalos	Philip Vaughn	September 21, 2012	122b	N/A
Sheen gets very bad breath, and he uses his breath to fight off Baby Arms Banarog from kidnapping the Emperor. Then Banarog also gets bad breath to fight back, so Sheen must find a new way to defeat him.
20a	"Sheen for a Day"	Keith Alcorn and Mike Gasaway	Jeff Goode and Anthony Charman	September 28, 2012	104a	N/A
The Emperor wants Sheen's help getting a gift for Princess Oom's "Popping Out Day". This is a day celebrating the formation of her second face. Sheen unknowingly gives Oom a part of his rocket, and he must get it back from her.
20b	"Well Bread Man"	Todd Grimes	Jim Hope, Sean Presant, and Allen Jay Zipper	September 28, 2012	104b	N/A
Sheen wants to participate in the Zeenuian tradition of "Broppling". However, he must first pass the "Manhood Trial by Fire". Dorkus offers to help him prepare in an effort to destroy him.
21a	"Nesmith is Spoken For"	Craig George	Jim Hope, Sean Presant, and Allen Jay Zipper	October 5, 2012	121a	N/A
Nesmith wants to prove to the Emperor and Zeenu that he is not Sheen's pet. Nesmith decides to plan a science presentation for them, but then he loses his ability to speak! Sheen must help him by hiding his inability to speak during his presentation.
21b	"Feeling Roovy"	Ian Freedman	Jim Hope, Sean Presant, and Allen Jay Zipper	October 5, 2012	121b	N/A
Aseefa loses her Roove, a creature that lives in Glimmorian's throats that helps them function (such as allowing for balance and the ability to yodel). Sheen and his friends help her look for it.
22a	"Shave the Last Dance for Me"	Chad Van De Keere	Keith Alcorn	October 26, 2012	124a	N/A
Aseefa needs a dance partner, so she asks Sheen.
22b	"MetamorphoSheen"	Chad Van De Keere	Jim Hope, Sean Presant, and Allen Jay Zipper	October 26, 2012	125a	N/A
Sheen plans on participating in the Celebration of Legs Parade. However, Sheen has been using a mysterious oil, and he seems to be turning into an eel-like creature. Sheen must figure out a way to still participate in the celebration with this condition.
23a	"Berry Big Trouble"	Francisco Avalos	Jim Hope, Sean Presant, and Allen Jay Zipper	November 2, 2012	124b	N/A
Sheen eats an odd berry, despite Aseefa's warnings not to eat it. He ends up experiencing various side effects such as becoming giant. Sheen then ends up having to face a tar monster.
23b	"MiSheen Impossible"	Francisco Avalos	Jim Hope, Sean Presant, and Allen Jay Zipper	November 2, 2012	125b	N/A
Doppy is taken by a group of gloop harvesters, so Sheen and Nesmith must rescue him.
24a	"Blunderlings"	Craig George	Jim Hope, Sean Presant, and Allen Jay Zipper	November 9, 2012	117a	N/A
Dorkus and Sheen swap sidekicks (Doppy and Pinter) so Pinter can get closer to Sheen. Dorkus then plans on using Pinter to destroy Sheen. Pinter then faces a moral dilemma as he develops a friendship with Sheen.
24b	"Dawn of the Wedge"	Ian Freedman	Jim Hope, Sean Presant, and Allen Jay Zipper	November 9, 2012	117b	N/A
25a	"Nightmare Sheenario"	Craig George	Jim Hope, Sean Presant, and Allen Jay Zipper	November 16, 2012	123a	N/A
Note: With guest voice Fran Drescher as The Empress
25b	"Drak a Bye Baby"	Ian Freedman	Jim Hope, Sean Presant, and Allen Jay Zipper	November 16, 2012	123b	N/A
Sheen finds a baby Drakbog, and he cares for it.
26	"Banana Quest"	Craig George and Ian Freedman	Jim Hope, Sean Presant, and Allen Jay Zipper	February 15, 2013	126	N/A
Sheen, Assefa, and Doppy to find the banana to save Nesmith before Dorkus does. Note: Special double-length episode.

== Home media ==
=== Main ===
- The Complete Series (September 25, 2014)
- The Complete Series (Reprint) (February 9, 2021)

=== Episodes on other DVDs ===
- Fanboy & Chum Chum (May 24, 2011, includes pilot episode on bonus features)

== Reception and legacy ==
The show received generally negative reviews. Emily Ashby of Common Sense Media gave the series 3 out of 5 stars; saying that, "While there isn't any content that's overtly problematic, there's equally little of any real value to kids."

Spencer Bollettieri of Comic Book Resources assessed in 2024: "Sheen Estevez worked well enough as a comic relief character, but few were clamoring for a show centered around him. Given the rare chance to explore the Ultra Lord-obsessed fanboy, Planet Sheen instead squandered it with lackluster plots, forced humor, and a protagonist who wears out his welcome within the first few episodes. While Sheen would never reach home by his final episode, it's unlikely anybody's asking for another season to see that happen."
