= Jimmy Neutron: Boy Genius (video game) =

2001 video game

- North American cover art for PlayStation 2
- Developers: AWE Games (PC); BigSky Interactive (PS2, GC); Human Soft (GBA)
- Publisher: THQ
- Platforms: Microsoft Windows; Game Boy Advance; PlayStation 2 GameCube
- Release: Game Boy Advance, Microsoft Windows: NA: November 6, 2001; EU: March 15, 2002; AU: June 9, 2002; PlayStation 2: NA: September 25, 2002; EU: March 7, 2003; AU: April 9, 2003; GameCube: NA: December 16, 2002; EU: March 7, 2003
- Genres: Adventure, platform
- Mode: Single-player

Jimmy Neutron: Boy Genius is a video game based on the 2001 Nickelodeon movie of the same name for Microsoft Windows, Game Boy Advance, GameCube, and PlayStation 2.

Debi Derryberry, Rob Paulsen, Mark DeCarlo, Frank Welker, Candi Milo, Jeffrey Garcia, Carolyn Lawrence, Crystal Scales and Megan Cavanagh reprise their voices from the movie in this game. However, in the console version, Wally Wingert does the voice of Rob Paulsen's characters.

== Gameplay ==
=== Console Versions ===
The game is a 3-D adventure starring a boy named James Isaac Neutron (or Jimmy Neutron for short) and his robot dog Goddard. In the game, the evil King Goobot has abducted some of Jimmy's friends, so Jimmy must begin an intergalactic quest to save them. While progressing through various locales inspired by the movie, players need to solve puzzles using an assortment of gadgets. Also included are various mini-games to play within an amusement park, as well as hidden movie clips, Rugrats and SpongeBob trailers, character bios, and movie trailers to be unlocked.

Played from a traditional third-person perspective, the game consists of five distinct regions linked together by a main hub. Once players decide on a region, they can enter a portal and then be whisked away to a 3D world. Among the environments players explore are Jimmy's House, an Asteroid Surface, an Asteroid Interior, Yolkus Prime, and Retroland Amusement Park. Each region spans multiple levels, with the goal in each being to find a number of key items and special prizes and a shrunken head. A secondary goal in some levels is to locate friends Carl Wheezer, Cindy Vortex, Rose, Nissa, and Zachary.

Enemies trying to stop Jimmy from succeeding include giant ants and the blob-like Yokians, with villains Ooblar, Poultra, and King Goobot forming the boss encounters. Players can run, jump, kick, and use an assortment of inventions. Health can be replenished by finding slices of blueberry pie, extra lives are awarded for every ten neutrons found, and weapons include the Shrink Ray, Inflato Ray, and the Jimmy Bat. Three types of vehicles can also be used to traverse the levels, the Goddard Pogo, the Goddard Sled, and the Goddard Scooter.

Bonus features include a behind the scenes feature hosted by Nick Cannon, as well as footage from the movie, shorts, and trailers can be unlocked.

=== PC Version ===
A completely different version of the game was developed by AWE Games for PC. Like the console versions it is a 3-D game, however this version is more of an open world title with areas that can be explored being Jimmy's House and Neighborhood, Jimmy's Lab, Retroville Elementary School, Retroland, Area 51, and Downtown Retroville. These areas can mostly be entered through connected sites, though as these areas are visited, Jimmy is capable of using phone booths to fast travel to these areas. The control system is different and has been tailored for keyboard and mouse controls.

In addition to the main plot, there are several side quests that encourage players to explore. There are escaped carnivorous plants and T-Rexes that Jimmy must use his shrink ray on to collect them and return them to his lab. There are also Red and Blue Neutrons scattered throughout the world. Blue Neutrons act as fuel for Jimmy's jetpack, while Red Neutrons act as a type of special collectable found in obscure or hard to reach places.

As the game progresses, Jimmy gets access to several inventions which aid his progress and encourage exploration further, most of these inventions include optional tutorial levels that teach players how to use them. The use of all these inventions are necessary to find all the Red Neutrons in each environment and complete the game.

Most notably, despite not reprising his role in the console versions, Rob Paulsen lends his voice to this version of the game.

== Reception ==
Reception

Aggregate scores
Aggregator	Score			
Aggregator	GBA	GameCube	PC	PS2
GameRankings	81.67%	40.57%	N/A	69%
Metacritic	N/A	42/100	N/A	40/100

Review scores
Publication	Score			
Publication	GBA	GameCube	PC	PS2
AllGame	3/5	1.5/5	2/5	2/5
Computer and Video Games	7/10	N/A	N/A	N/A
GameZone	8/10	N/A	N/A	N/A
NGC Magazine	N/A	18%	N/A	N/A
Nintendo Power	3.5/5	N/A	N/A	N/A
X-Play	N/A	2/5	N/A	N/A

Metacritic gave the GameCube version of the game a score of 42 out of 100 based on four "Generally unfavorable reviews". Elsewhere, GameRankings gave it a score of 81.67% for the Game Boy Advance version, 69% for the PlayStation 2 version, and 40.57% for the GameCube version.
