= Candi Milo =

American actress (born 1961)

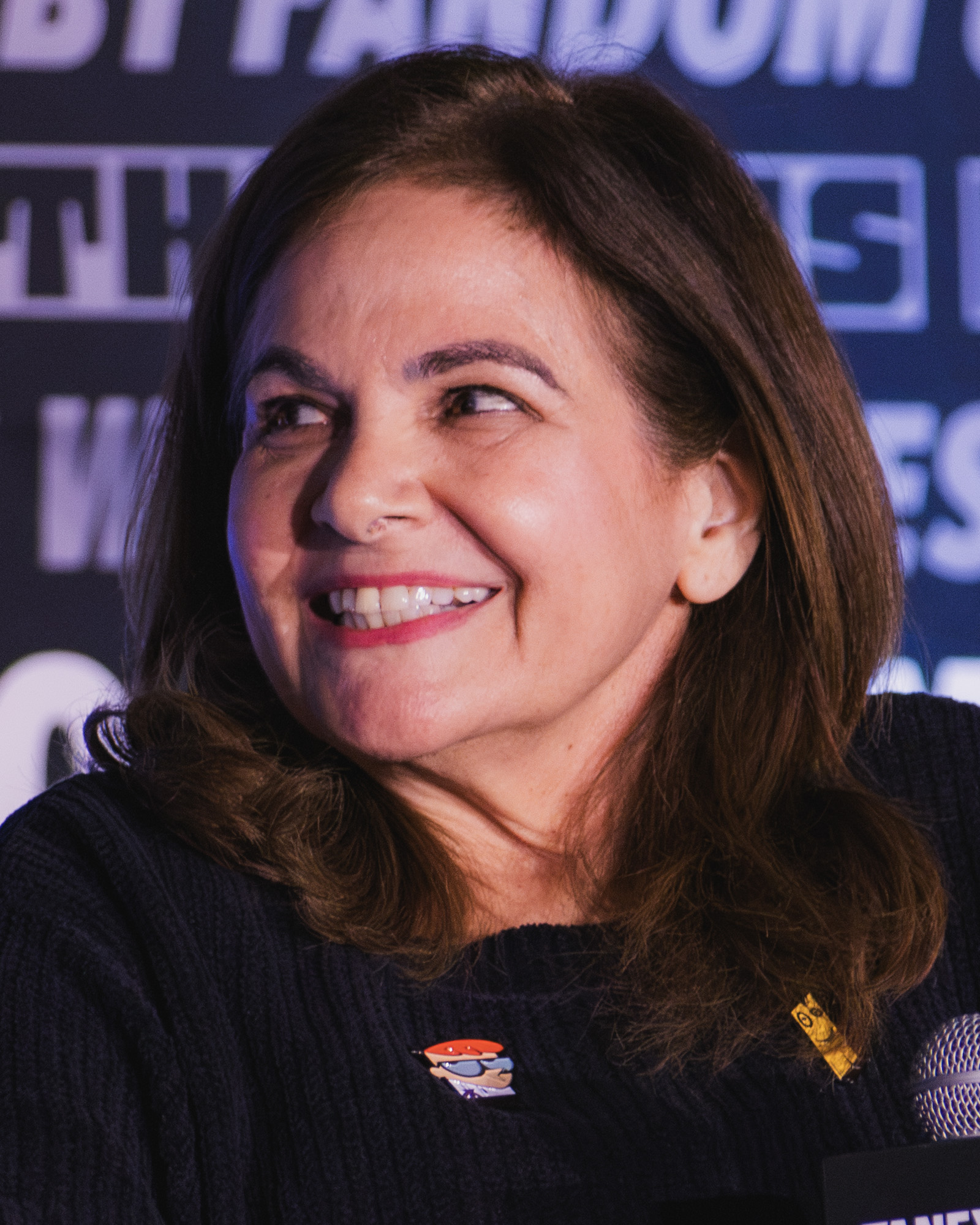
- Milo in 2026
- Born: Candyce Anne Rose Milo; January 9, 1961 (age 65); Palm Springs, California, U.S.
- Occupation: Actress
- Years active: 1964–present
- Spouse: Gary Hankins (m. 1986; div. 2003)
- Children: 1
- Website: candimilo.com

Candyce Anne Rose Milo (born January 9, 1961) is an American actress. She has voiced various characters on many animated series, including Tiny Toon Adventures, Dexter's Laboratory, ¡Mucha Lucha!, W.I.T.C.H., My Life as a Teenage Robot, ChalkZone, Foster's Home for Imaginary Friends, The Adventures of Jimmy Neutron, Boy Genius, Maya & Miguel, The Life and Times of Juniper Lee, Astro Boy, El Tigre: The Adventures of Manny Rivera, SWAT Kats: The Radical Squadron, Cow and Chicken, Codename: Kids Next Door, Loonatics Unleashed, The Replacements, and Pig Goat Banana Cricket,. She has voiced the Looney Tunes characters Granny and Witch Hazel since 2017 and Petunia Pig since 2022.

== Early life ==
Milo was born on January 9, 1961, in Palm Springs, California. Her family moved to San Jose shortly after her birth. In San Jose, Milo attended the all-girls Presentation High School. Her father, Tony "Nino" Migliaccio, was a child actor who changed his last name to Milo when he started playing adult roles. Her first appearance on stage was with her father at Turk Murphy's in 1964, where they sang Me and My Shadow together. In 1969, her father founded a group home for the developmentally disabled. By the time Milo was eleven, she was participating in children's musical theater.

== Career ==
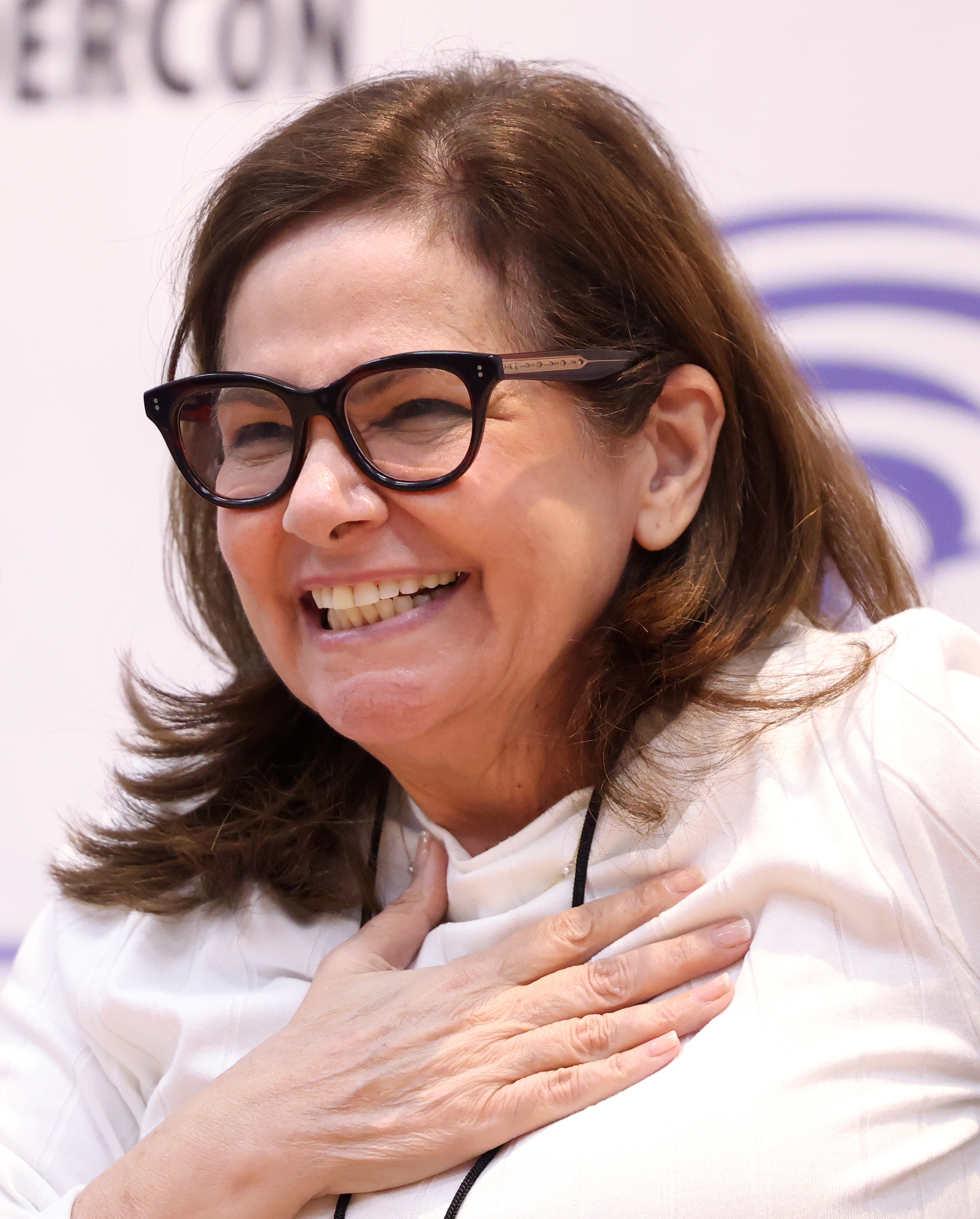
Milo in 2025

In 1977, she began singing in theme park attractions, most notably at Disneyland in Anaheim. Afterwards, she started appearing in roles in movies and television series, such as Gimme a Break!, Knots Landing, and Perfect Strangers. Milo was also a member of "The Mighty Carson Art Players" on The Tonight Show Starring Johnny Carson. She accidentally got into voiceover acting after singing on stage. She was signed by The William Morris Agency for voice acting, which was initially disappointing to her because Milo originally wanted a singing career.

Milo's first voice role was Sweetie Pie in Tiny Toon Adventures in 1990. Milo first auditioned in 1988 for Tiny Toons by reading The Three Little Pigs, but made the wolf kosher and the three pigs suicidal and she booked the job. She later played Lonette, an attractive animated waitress; Bob, a member of Holli Would's gang of goons who was a cross-dresser and other characters in Cool World in addition to feeding lines to the other actors.

She went on to be very active in cartoons, voicing Pakka in Cro, Ann Gora in SWAT Kats: The Radical Squadron, Little Red Riding Hood in 2 Stupid Dogs, and the main characters' Mom, who was an unseen character and their teacher in Cow and Chicken.

Later, she replaced Christine Cavanaugh as the voice of Dexter in Dexter's Laboratory in 2001 when Cavanaugh retired from voice acting. Milo voiced Dexter until the end of the series, which is later confirmed as its permanent discontinuation by the show's creator Genndy Tartakovsky as he declared Cavanaugh's input for Dexter to be irreplaceable. Her other voice credits include The Flea on ¡Mucha Lucha! and the title character in the U.S. version of the 2003 Astro Boy (Tetsuwan Atomu) series.

From 2002 to 2006, she performed the voice of Snap in ChalkZone and Dr. Nora Wakeman in My Life as a Teenage Robot. For this role, she was subsequently nominated for the Annie Award in 2004 and 2005. During this time, the actress also voiced Ophelia Ramírez in The Life and Times of Juniper Lee, the titular protagonist Maya Santos in Maya & Miguel, Irma Lair in W.I.T.C.H., Zadavia in Loonatics Unleashed, as well as Coco, Madame Foster, and Cheese in Foster's Home for Imaginary Friends.

Milo says that when creating a unique voice the artist's drawings speak to her and that she prides herself on creating "a full life" for each character.

In October 2015, she made her return to the stage, playing the role of Grandmama Addams in the 3-D Theatricals version of The Addams Family.

In 2019, she directed Suicidal Blonde, which stars Kimmy Robertson.

Milo returned once again to stage in February 2020 with another 3-D Theatricals play called Kinky Boots, with her playing Trish.

== Personal life ==
Milo is divorced and has one daughter, Gabriella, who is also an actress. She has described herself as being of partial Latin American descent.

== Filmography ==
=== Television animation ===
- 2 Stupid Dogs – Little Red Riding Hood, Mama Bear, Female Platypus
- The 7D – Baroness Bon Bon
- Aaahh!!! Real Monsters – Additional voices
- The Adventures of Jimmy Neutron, Boy Genius – Nick Dean, Britney, additional voices
- The Adventures of Kid Danger – Mrs. Elliot, Female Mailman, Marla Meadows, Zombie, Lana, Witches
- The Adventures of Puss in Boots – Kid Pickles, Cleevil, Orange, Doozill, Luella, additional voices
- Aladdin – Thundra
- All Grown Up! – Justin, Brianna, Amelia, Doctor, Cafeteria lady, Gawky Kid, Kid #3 (2)
- American Dragon: Jake Long – Annika
- The Angry Beavers – Tanya Goode
- Astro Boy (English dub) – Astro Boy, Kennedy
- As Told by Ginger – Claire Gripling, additional voices
- Batman Beyond – Nicole (Ep. "Dead Man's Hand")
- Be Cool, Scooby-Doo! – Ms. Tuckell (Ep. "There Wolf")
- Breadwinners – Roni (Ep. "Pizzawinners"), additional voices
- Blaze and the Monster Machines – Sister Cow, Little Cow
- Bobby's World – Tiffany, Amber, Andrea
- Bubble Guppies – additional voices
- Bugs Bunny Builders – Pauleen Penguin
- The Buzz on Maggie – Chip, Mrs. Wingston, Nurse Hatchison, Mrs. Lunch Lady, Mrs. Flybottom
- The Boondocks – Janet O'Siren (Ep. "The Itis")
- The Cartoonstitute – Po (Ep. "The Borneos")
- Camp Candy – Robin (season 3)
- Captain Planet and the Planeteers – Betty Jean (Ep. "Going Bats, Man")
- ChalkZone – Snap, Reggie Bullnerd, Blocky
- Chowder – Frog Lady, Chicken Lady, Rosemary, Big Food, Droopy Faced Lady, Eagle, Girl, Gyoza, Sexy Lady Voice, Rake, additional voices
- Clifford the Big Red Dog – Ms. Martinez
- Clifford's Puppy Days – Nina's Mother, Hester, Gray Puppy
- Codename: Kids Next Door – Henrietta Von Marzipan, Mrs. Betty Gilligan, Lydia (Grandma) Gilligan, Leaky Leona, Lasso Lass, Miss Goodwall, Edna Jucation, Heli-Teacher, Madam Margaret
- Cow and Chicken – Mom, Teacher, additional voices
- Cro – Pakka
- The Cuphead Show! – Cherry and Brandywine Heirloom
- Curious George – Mrs. Quint, Mrs. Donuts
- Darkwing Duck – Duck Ling, Lamont, Additional voices
- Detention – Juliana (Ep. "Capitol Punishment")
- Dexter's Laboratory – Dexter (Seasons 3–4), additional voices (Seasons 2-4)
- Duck Dodgers – Rikki Roundhouse (Ep. "The Menace of Maninsuit")
- Dumb and Dumber – Various voices
- El Tigre: The Adventures of Manny Rivera – Zoe Aves/Black Cuervo, additional voices
- The Emperor's New School – Coach Sweetie
- Fanboy & Chum Chum – Lupe
- Fillmore! – Receptionist
- Foster's Home for Imaginary Friends – Madame Foster, Coco, Cheese, additional voices
- Gary & Mike – Francine (The Mole Woman), Sister Marie, Wendy's Grandma, Grade School Teacher, Corn Dog Waitress, Vanessa Wexler, additional voices
- Glitch Techs – Kids, Brother, Little Contestant, Lupita
- The Grim Adventures of Billy & Mandy – Grim's Mom
- Hey Arnold! – Charice, Parrot
- I Am Weasel – Additional voices
- Invader Zim – Additional voices
- Jakers! The Adventures of Piggley Winks – Gosford
- Jellystone! – Dexter, Cheese (Ep. "Crisis on Infinite Mirths")
- Johnny Bravo – Various voices
- Kulipari: An Army of Frogs – Dingo, The Stargazer, Fahlga
- LeapFrog Video Series – Leap (4 DVDs)
- The Legend of Calamity Jane – Zita
- The Life and Times of Juniper Lee – Ophelia Ramírez, Barbara Lee, Ms Gomez
- Loonatics Unleashed – Zadavia, Misty Breeze, Queen Granicus, Harriet Runner, Alien Girl, Female Reporter, Mum, Old Lady, Monitor
- The Looney Tunes Show – Svetlana (Ep. "Fish and Visitors")
- Looney Tunes Cartoons – Granny, Mama Bear, Miss Prissy, Witch Hazel
- Max Steel – Female Surfer, Kelly Gear, Young Fan, Secretary
- Maya & Miguel – Maya Santos, Tito Chavez
- Me, Eloise! – Margarita, Bruce, Bobby, Emmy, Tutor Candidate #1, Betty
- Mighty Magiswords – Morbidia ("Too Many Warriors" only), Vambre's Brain, Dolphin Magisword (EP02 only), Grand Poobah, additional voices
- ¡Mucha Lucha! – The Flea, Pulgita, The Headmistress, Mama Maniaca, La Flamencita, Electricity, Cindy Slam (season 3), Various characters
- The Mummy: Secrets of the Medjai – Tiga (Ep. "The Cloud People")
- My Life as a Teenage Robot – Nora Wakeman, Pteresa, additional voices
- New Looney Tunes – Granny, Witch Hazel, Ivana, Bear Scout, Phoebe, Weasel Scout
- The New Woody Woodpecker Show – Jeanie
- Oddballs – Old Woman
- OK K.O.! Let's Be Heroes – Combo Breaker, Miss Pastel, Phoebe
- Oh Yeah! Cartoons – Tutu, Baxter, additional voices
- Ozzy & Drix – Mumsy Glop (Ep. "A Growing Cell")
- Pepper Ann – Constance Goldman
- Pet Alien – Gabby, Tommy's Mom, Melba, additional voices
- Phineas and Ferb – Ducky Momo Kiosk Girl, additional voices
- Pig Goat Banana Cricket – Goat, additional voices
- Pinky and the Brain/Pinky, Elmyra & the Brain – Additional voices
- Planet Sheen – Princess OomLout, additional voices
- The Plucky Duck Show – Sweetie Pie
- The Powerpuff Girls – Newswoman, Cleaning Woman
- Puss in Book: Trapped in an Epic Tale – Kid Pickles, Cleevil, Mama Bear
- Random! Cartoons – Yumi, Octopus, Nurse Duckett, Bee
- Rayman: The Animated Series – Grub's mother (Ep. "High Anxiety")
- The Replacements – Amanda McMurphy, Jacobo, Heidi Klutzberry, Mrs. Winters
- Rise of the Teenage Mutant Ninja Turtles – Carly Balmaceda, Mother, Reporter, Girl 1
- Rugrats – Various voices
- Santo Bugito – Rosa, additional voices
- The Secret Saturdays – Dr. Pachacutes, Arab Reporter
- Spy Kids: Mission Critical – Vida Immortata, Malware, Mauly the Sparkle Scout, Glendora Chatting-Botham
- Stanley – Ms. Diaz
- SWAT Kats: The Radical Squadron – Ann Gora
- T.U.F.F. Puppy – The Queen, Lunch Ladybug, Classmate #1
- The Tick – Blitzen (Ep. "Tick vs Europe")
- Time Squad – Dexter
- Tiny Toon Adventures – Sweetie Bird
- Tiny Toons Looniversity – Montana Max, Dean Granny, Witch Hazel
- TripTank – Various voices
- W.I.T.C.H. – Irma Lair
- What a Cartoon! – Various voices
- What-a-Mess – Ramona
- Whatever Happened to... Robot Jones? – Various voices
- Where on Earth Is Carmen Sandiego? – Additional voices
- Where's Waldo? – Chili Judge, Grandmother
- The Wild Thornberrys – Additional voices
- Woody Woodpecker – Mrs. Woodpecker, Mother Nature

=== Animated films ===
Year	Title	Role	Notes
1992	Tiny Toon Adventures: How I Spent My Vacation	Sweetie Pie	Direct-to-video
1992	Aladdin	Fatima, Aladdin's Mother	
1992	Cool World	Lonette	
1994	A Hollywood Hounds Christmas	Rosie	Direct-to-video
1995	The New Adventures of Peter Rabbit	Peter's Mother, Perky	Direct-to-video
1999	An American Tail: The Mystery of the Night Monster	Madam Mousey	Direct-to-video
2000	Scooby-Doo and the Alien Invaders	Crystal, Amber	Direct-to-video
2001	Jimmy Neutron: Boy Genius	Nick Dean, Britney, PJ	
2001	Spirited Away	Additional voices	English dub
2003	Scooby-Doo! and the Monster of Mexico	Charlene/Museum Guide, Old Woman #1	Direct-to-video
2004	¡Mucha Lucha!: The Return of El Maléfico	The Flea, The Headmistress, Ricochet's Mom	Direct-to-video
2005	The Legend of Frosty the Snowman	Mrs. Tinkerton, Girl #2	Direct-to-video
2005	The Happy Elf	Cassie, Curtis, Gurt, Little Girl	TV special
2005	Thru the Moebius Strip	Additional voices	English dub
2006	The Ant Bully	Nurse Ant #3	
2006	Casper's Scare School	Mickey	TV film
2008	Destination: Imagination	Coco, Madame Foster, Purple Puppy, Mom	TV special
2010	Kung-Fu Magoo	Gor-Illiana, McBarker, Sid's Mom	Direct-to-video
2012	Big Top Scooby-Doo!	Jean	Direct-to-video
2012	Exchange Student Zero	Avere, Queen Karuta, Queen Blackyard	TV film
2013	Justice League: The Flashpoint Paradox	Persephone	Direct-to-video
2013	Scooby-Doo! Stage Fright	Barb Damon	Direct-to-video
2014	Scooby-Doo! Frankencreepy	Gypsy/Lila	Direct-to-video
2015	The Snow Queen 2	Rosa	English dub
2021	Space Jam: A New Legacy	Granny	
2021	The Loud House Movie	Submarine Captain	
2021	Rumble	Docks Referee, Jane, Director	
2022	King Tweety	Granny	Direct-to-video
2022	Trick or Treat Scooby-Doo!	Alice Dovely, Dinosaur Kid, Monster Kid	
2022	Naked Mole Rat Gets Dressed: The Underground Rock Experience	Additional voices	
2025	The Day the Earth Blew Up: A Looney Tunes Movie	Petunia Pig	
2026	Coyote vs. Acme	Granny, Witch Hazel, Miss Prissy	

=== Live-action film ===
Year	Title	Role	Notes
1985	Bad Medicine	Maria Morales	
1985	Reaching for the Stars	Herself	
1990	Almost an Angel	Bank Teller	
1992	I Don't Buy Kisses Anymore	Mother in Store	
1993	At Home with the Webbers	2nd Woman on Street	
1996	Ripper Man	Francie	
2017	Gloria Talks Funny	Gloria	
2018	When Jeff Tried to Save the World	Sheila	

=== Live-action television ===
Year	Title	Role	Notes
—N/a	Amero Squad	Flemma, Destroyer of Pyramid	Female Version of Fladdam
1984	Gimme a Break!	Leslie	Episode: "Flashback"
1985	Days of Our Lives	Janey Richards	
1986	Perfect Strangers	Gina Morelli	2 episodes
1990	Knots Landing	Nurse	2 episodes
1990	Night Court	Woman	Episode: "Can't Buy Me Love"
1993	Doogie Howser, M.D.	Doctor	Episode: "It's a Tough Job ... But Why Does My Father Have to Do It?"
1993	Empty Nest	Mrs. Ortiz	Episode: "Love and Marriage"
2001	City Guys	Rude Customer	Episode: "Rosie O'Diner"
2013	Wilfred	Secretary	Episode: "Regrets"

=== Video games ===
- Astro Boy – Astro Boy
- Baten Kaitos Origins – Almarde
- Cartoon Network Racing – Dexter
- Cartoon Network Universe: FusionFall – Dexter, Coco, Cheese
- Dexter's Laboratory: Mandark's Lab? – Dexter
- Dexter's Laboratory: Science Ain't Fair – Dexter
- Dissidia Final Fantasy – Shantotto
- Dissidia 012 Final Fantasy – Shantotto
- Dissidia Final Fantasy NT – Shantotto
- Final Fantasy X – Dona
- Final Fantasy X-2 – Dona, Lucil, Pacce
- Final Fantasy XIII – Cocoon Inhabitants
- Final Fantasy XV – Leviathan
- Jimmy Neutron: Boy Genius (PC Version) – Nick Dean
- Jimmy Neutron: Boy Genius (PS2 version) - Nick Dean, Sam Melvick, Fortune Teller
- Looney Tunes: Wacky World of Sports – Granny, Witch Hazel
- Nickelodeon All-Star Brawl 2 – Nora Wakeman
- Nickelodeon Toon Twister 3-D - Chuckie Finster
- Resonance of Fate – Additional voices
- Rugrats: All Growed Up - Chuckie Finster
- Rugrats: Royal Ransom – Chuckie Finster
- Rugrats Go Wild – Chuckie Finster
- SpongeBob SquarePants Featuring Nicktoons: Globs of Doom – Ms. Bitters
- The Adventures of Jimmy Neutron: Boy Genius: Attack of the Twonkies - Nick Dean, New Reporter
- Ty the Tasmanian Tiger 3: Night of the Quinkan – Redback Thorn
- Valkyria Chronicles – Additional voices (as Candy Milo)
- World of Final Fantasy – Shantotto

=== Theater ===
- Twelfth Night – Maria
- Life's Too Short – One-Woman Show
- Hip is a Relative Term – One-Woman Show
- Dreamgirls – Ensemble Soloist
- To Sir, with Love – Baby
- Mamma Mia – Rosie
- Funny Business – Ensemble
- Just for Laughs – Stand Up Comedienne
- The Addams Family – Grandmama Addams
- 9 to 5 – Roz
- Kinky Boots – Trish

=== Theme parks ===
Year	Title	Role	Notes
2004	The Amazing Adventures of Spider-Man	Scream	
2005	Robots of Mars 3D Adventure	Melody	

=== Web series ===
Year	Title	Role	Notes
2019–present	Ollie & Scoops	Cuddles	
