= Jimmy Neutron: Boy Genius =

2001 animated film by John A. Davis

- Theatrical release poster
- Directed by: John A. Davis
- Screenplay by: John A. Davis; David N. Weiss; J. David Stem; Steve Oedekerk
- Story by: John A. Davis; Steve Oedekerk
- Produced by: O Entertainment: Steve Oedekerk; DNA Productions: John A. Davis; Nickelodeon: Albie Hecht
- Starring: Debi Derryberry; Patrick Stewart; Martin Short; Rob Paulsen; Jeffrey Garcia; Carolyn Lawrence
- Edited by: Jon Michael Price; Gregory Perler
- Music by: John Debney
- Production companies: Nickelodeon Movies; O Entertainment; DNA Productions
- Distributed by: Paramount Pictures (United States and Canada); United International Pictures (International)
- Release dates: December 9, 2001 (Paramount studio lot); December 21, 2001 (United States)
- Running time: 83 minutes
- Country: United States (Note: Attributed to multiple sources:)
- Language: English
- Budget: $25–30 million
- Box office: $103 million

Jimmy Neutron: Boy Genius is a 2001 American animated science fiction comedy film directed by John A. Davis and written by Davis, David N. Weiss, J. David Stem, and Steve Oedekerk, from a story written by Davis and Oedekerk. Produced by Nickelodeon Movies and DNA Productions in association with O Entertainment, the film features the voice of Debi Derryberry as the titular character, a schoolboy with super-genius intelligence, who must save all the parents of his hometown from a race of egg-like aliens known as the Yolkians. The voice cast also includes Patrick Stewart, Martin Short, Rob Paulsen, Jeffrey Garcia, and Carolyn Lawrence.

The film was initially conceived by Davis as Runaway Rocketboy!, featuring a character named Johnny Quasar. After being dormant for years, the concept was revamped into a computer-animated short and pitched to Nickelodeon, which led to the development of both a television series and a full-length film. Production for the film commenced in early 2000 and took 24 months, significantly increasing staff and studio space. Jimmy Neutron: Boy Genius was the first computer-animated film to be created entirely with off-the-shelf animation programs, which included LightWave 3D, messiah:studio and Alias Maya. DNA Productions, Davis' animation studio, handled the animation for the film.

Jimmy Neutron: Boy Genius premiered at the Paramount studio lot on December 9, 2001, before being theatrically released in the United States on December 21 by Paramount Pictures. It was a critical and commercial success, grossing $103 million against a budget of $25–30 million. It was nominated for the inaugural Academy Award for Best Animated Feature at the 74th Academy Awards. It spawned an expanded franchise, including a television series, a spin-off series, video games, and a simulator ride at Universal Studios Florida.

== Plot ==
Ten-year-old boy genius Jimmy Neutron lives in Retroville with his parents, Judy and Hugh, and his robot dog, Goddard. Jimmy's friends are overweight Carl Wheezer and hyperactive Sheen Estevez, and his long-standing rival intelligent classmate Cindy Vortex teases him for his small stature. After Jimmy launches a communications satellite into space hoping to contact alien life, he crashes his makeshift rocket into the roof of his family's home, upsetting his mother. The next day, Jimmy, Carl, and Sheen learn of the grand opening of Retroland, an amusement park. Popular kid, Nick Dean, convinces the boys to sneak out and attend. Jimmy's mother refuses to let him attend the park that night after his jetpack accidentally starts a fire in the house. Taking Nick's advice, Jimmy uses his shrink ray invention to sneak out, and meets Carl and Sheen at Retroland for a night of fun.

Meanwhile, Jimmy's satellite is intercepted by the Yolkians, a race of egg-like aliens from the planet Yolkus. Their leader, King Goobot, along with his bumbling assistant Ooblar, views Jimmy's message, and upon noticing a picture featuring Jimmy's parents, declares his search complete. The Yolkians arrive on Earth and abduct all the adults in Retroville except Jimmy's teacher Miss Fowl (due to having been shrunken down to a small size by Jimmy's shrink ray). As their ships return to space, Jimmy, Carl, and Sheen mistake their departure for a shooting star, prompting Jimmy to wish that their parents were gone. The next morning, all the children notice their parents are missing and party recklessly. At first, having no parents is fun for the children, but the following day they are miserable and realize they need their parents. Jimmy learns that his satellite has been found and deduces the parents have been abducted. He enlists the children to create rocket ships out of Retroland's rides, and they blast off into space after their families.

After braving a meteor shower and camping on an asteroid, Jimmy and the others eventually reach Yolkus and find the parents with mind control devices attached to their heads. When Jimmy tries to get the mind-control helmet off of his father, Goobot and Ooblar capture them and reveal that Jimmy had led the Yolkians directly to Earth to take their parents, whom they intend to sacrifice to their god Poultra. Goobot orders the children, Jimmy included, locked in a dungeon while having Ooblar take Goddard to the lab and have him destroyed. As the other children blame Jimmy for their predicament, Cindy, taking pity on Jimmy, confesses she and the other children need him and encourages Jimmy to fix things by helping them escape. Using a cellphone owned by Cindy's friend, Libby Folfax, Jimmy contacts Goddard, who escapes from Ooblar and frees the children.

Jimmy and company reach the Yolkians' Colosseum, where a giant egg hatches and releases Poultra, a gigantic three-eyed alien chicken. As Goobot arranges the parents to be eaten using a mind control remote, Jimmy rallies the children to storm the colosseum and battle the guards while Sheen retrieves an escape vessel, which knocks Poultra on the head upon his return. Jimmy steals the remote from Goobot and the children escape Yolkus with the parents. Goobot arranges a fleet to pursue them, which is all destroyed when the children fly their ship around the surface of the Sun, save for Goobot's vessel. When Goobot and Ooblar mock Jimmy's short size, Jimmy charges at Goobot's ship with Goddard in a flying bike form and uses his shrink ray to enlarge himself into the size of a planet. He then blows Goobot's vessel away into an asteroid, destroying it. Goobot survives and vows revenge. On the return trip to Earth, Jimmy reconciles with his parents, admitting that despite his intelligence, he still depends on them.

Meanwhile, the still-shrunken Miss Fowl is seen riding on an apple worm, named Mr. Wiggles, on her way to the cafeteria in the elementary school hall.

== Cast ==
- Debi Derryberry as James Isaac Neutron
- Patrick Stewart as King Goobot V
- Martin Short as Ooblar
- Carolyn Lawrence as Cindy Vortex
- Rob Paulsen as Carl Wheezer, Ebenezer and Martha Wheezer, Kid in Classroom
- Jeffrey Garcia as Sheen Estevez
- Crystal Scales as Libby Folfax
- Frank Welker as Goddard, Poultra, Worm, Demon, Girl-Eating Plant, Oyster
- Candi Milo as Nick Dean, Britney, PJ
- Megan Cavanagh as Judy Neutron, VOX, Mrs. Vortex
- Mark DeCarlo as Hugh Neutron, Pilot, Arena Guard, Mr. Vortex
- Carlos Alazraqui as Harp Estevez
- Kimberly Brooks as Courtney Tyler, Zachery Jones, Angie Jenson
- Andrea Martin as Ms. Fowl
- Billy West as Bobby's Twin Brother, Butch Pakovski, Old Man Johnson, Robobarber, Yolkian Officer, Jailbreak Cop, Anchor Boy, Flurp Announcer
- Bob Goen and Mary Hart as Yolkian newscasters
- Dee Bradley Baker as NORAD Officer
- David L. Lander as Yolkian Guard, Gus
- Jim Cummings as Ultra Lord, General Abercrombie, Mission Control
- Paul Greenberg as Guard
- Laraine Newman as Hostess
- Jeannie Elias as Nissa, Camera Person
- Michael Hagiwara as Chris
- Keith Alcorn as Bobby, Kid, Control Yolkian
- Richard Allen as Digital Voice
- Brian Capshaw as Screamer
- Cheryl Ray as Screamer
- Mark Menza as Yolkian Incubator Operator
- Matthew Russell as Hyperactive Kid, Arena Yolkian
- John A. Davis as Guard, Bennie, Octapuke kid

== Production ==
=== Development ===
The idea for a series about a boy with super-genius powers was first conceived in the 1980s by John A. Davis, who scripted and storyboarded a short narrative titled Runaway Rocketboy, centering around a character named Johnny Quasar (inspired by a facetious nickname that his summer co-workers had coined for him in his youth) who builds a rocket ship and runs away from his parents. Davis stated in an episode of the Nickelodeon Animation Podcast that he initially wrote the concept with the intention of creating it as a live-action film with special effects and matte shots, even going so far as to apply for a grant to fund the project, but found that getting such an investment was difficult since the film was not educational or informative. The idea laid dormant for several years until Davis came across the abandoned script while in the process of moving. Around the same time, Davis' Dallas-based studio, DNA Productions, had just begun experimenting with the use of computer animation after obtaining copies of LightWave 3D. In turn, Davis realized that the film would be fitting as a CGI film, since all of the science fiction set pieces could be entirely modeled in 3-D.

Davis, alongside studio co-founder Keith Alcorn, created a 40-second proof-of-concept demo film which depicted Johnny and his robot dog, Goddard, flying through an asteroid belt and greeting the viewers. Simultaneously, Davis and Alcorn worked to create a story bible outlining a potential television series. The demo short was shown off in 1995 at the SIGGRAPH CGI convention, where it was entered into a competition for LightWave films. The demo quickly garnered notability in the computer animation industry, receiving frequent press coverage in magazines and winning two "Wavey" awards- one for Best Character Animation and another for Best in Show. Among people who caught wind of the film was Steve Oedekerk, the founder of O Entertainment, who saw a still shot of Johnny and Goddard in a CGI magazine. Oedekerk, a strong backer of computer animation, was impressed by the characters' designs, stating in an interview that the image particularly stood out to him because it "seemed fun" compared to the mostly-photorealistic work being done with computer animation at the time. He cold-called Davis requesting to see a tape of the full short. After watching the demo, as well as seeing the show bible which Davis and Alcorn had developed, Oedekerk expressed interest in helping to pitch their concept to different networks.

After teaming up with O Entertainment, the company began working on developing a full-length episode for a TV series, titled The Adventures of Johnny Quasar, writing an expanded version of the original Runaway Rocket story and tweaking aspects of Johnny's design to make him look more like a child. In Fall 1995, the idea was pitched to Nickelodeon, who expressed immediate interest in the idea. Albie Hecht, the then-president of Nick, was particularly impressed, coining him to be "half Bart Simpson and half Albert Einstein", he strongly praised Johnny's blended personality as an adventurous and intelligent character and one grounded in the reality of childhood, which, according to him, made him "the perfect Nick kid". Following positive reception, Nickelodeon commissioned for a 13-minute pilot episode to be created. After several years of going through the review process, the episode began production in late 1997, and was completed in 1998. The name "Johnny Quasar" was changed at the request of Nickelodeon, who did not want the character to be confused with similarly named ones such as Jonny Quest and Captain Quazar, so Davis brainstormed other character names while walking his dog around the neighborhood block, eventually coming up with the final name, "Jimmy Neutron".

After the pilot was completed, Nickelodeon executives, who were impressed by the pilot and still enthusiastic about the show's potential, raised the prospect of creating a theatrical film to accompany the TV series, much to the surprise of Davis and his team at the studio. During the initial pitch to Nickelodeon, Oedekerk had highlighted the idea that using computer animation would allow the same models and assets to be reused between both a film and a TV show, an idea which Nick held strong faith in. Davis further suggested that the feature film be created first, since the characters being modeled could be created at a higher quality than they would have with a TV budget. Although Nick was worried that it would be more difficult to attract a movie-going audience without the TV show to build an install base for the series, these concerns were answered with a series of short TV interstitials which would begin airing in order to build up hype for the upcoming film.

With a budget of roughly $30 million, production of Jimmy Neutron: Boy Genius was greenlit in Fall 1999, and work began on a script for the film. Production officially started in February 2000 under the direction of Davis. In order to speed up the pace of work for a feature film, the company's staff count was considerably increased from 30 to around 150 employees, and the studio's workspace was also reformed in order to fit such a team of filmmakers. The film was completed in 24 months, roughly half that in which most other CGI films were completed.

=== Writing ===
The screenplay for Jimmy Neutron was written by Davis and Oedekerk, as well as Rugrats staff writers David N. Weiss and J. David Stem. In creating the many ideas in Jimmy Neutron, Davis and Oedekerk thought back to their childhoods, trying to think about "what a kid would create if he had the ability to create any kind of gadget". The film was largely inspired by Davis' own love of science fiction which he had since childhood, drawing influence from various sources including Thunderbirds and Ray Harryhausen's stop motion work. Oedekerk's 6-year-old daughter, Zoe, came up with the idea for "burp soda", which ultimately appeared in the movie as one of Jimmy's many inventions. According to Davis, the Ultralord-obsessed Sheen Estevez was inspired by Davis' own love of collecting. Sheen was initially intended to be Japanese, as he was named after the nickname of a Japanese employee who had worked for Davis, but the filmmakers had trouble finding a suitable voice actor of Japanese descent. Incidentally, they changed the character's nationality to Mexican after opening the role to a broader category and eventually settling on Mexican-American stand-up comic Jeff Garcia.

=== Casting ===
Nancy Cartwright, Pamela Adlon, and E.G. Daily were all considered for the role of Jimmy Neutron before Debi Derryberry was cast for the film and subsequent series. The film was Derryberry's biggest acting role at the time, as previously she had mostly provided minor roles in films and TV shows.

=== Animation ===
Jimmy Neutron was the first computer-animated film to be created entirely using commercial animation programs rather than proprietary software, with most animation done using both Lightwave and project:messiah. Characters were first modeled in Lightwave, after which they were rigged and animated in Messiah. Texture painting was done via Adobe Photoshop, while compositing work was completed in Alias Maya. In addition to serving as executive producer, Alcorn was the film's lead character designer, and created actively simplistic and cartoonish designs in order to avoid overcomplicating production. To animate crowd scenes, methods of simplification were used to make animation less time-consuming: characters that were farther from the camera had less articulation, and animators would duplicate the same characters, offset them to different areas, and change their body parts to differentiate them. One particular scene shows a crowd of 6000 Yolkians, each of which uses one of 30 distinct animation loops.

According to Davis, the character models were intentionally given a "sculpted, graphic look," both to avoid making them look overly realistic and to circumvent the prospect of having to deal with simulating cloth or hair. The over-the-top character designs, in turn, influenced the film world's aesthetic (e.g. cars were modeled to be able to fit the characters' stylistically large heads). Off-the-shelf shaders were favored over ones which created more photorealistic lighting in order to maintain a cartoonish appearance throughout.

== Music ==
Jimmy Neutron: Boy Genius has two albums that are derived from the film: Music from the Motion Picture, and Original Motion Picture Score.

=== Music from the Motion Picture ===
Jimmy Neutron: Boy Genius (Music from the Motion Picture)

Soundtrack album by Various artists
- Released: November 20, 2001
- Genres: Pop; teen pop; pop rap; dance pop; rock n' roll
- Length: 46:04
- Labels: Jive; Zomba; Nick

Singles from Jimmy Neutron: Boy Genius (Original Motion Picture Soundtrack)
- 1. "Intimidated" Released: September 24, 2001; 2. "Leave It Up to Me" Released: November 20, 2001; 3. "A.C.'s Alien Nation" Released: November 20, 2001; 4. "Go Jimmy Jimmy" Released: November 20, 2001; 5. "Jimmy Neutron Theme" Released: November 15, 2005

Jimmy Neutron: Boy Genius (Music from the Motion Picture) is the soundtrack for the film. It was released by Jive Records, Zomba Music, and Nick Records on November 20, 2001, a month prior to the film's release. It includes covers of DJ Jazzy Jeff and The Fresh Prince's "Parents Just Don't Understand", Thomas Dolby's "She Blinded Me With Science", and Kim Wilde's "Kids in America".

No.	Title	Artist	Length
1.	"Leave It Up to Me"	Aaron Carter	2:59
2.	"Pop" (Deep Dish Cha-Ching Remix)	NSYNC	4:13
3.	"Parents Just Don't Understand"	Lil' Romeo, Nick Cannon, and 3LW	3:55
4.	"Intimidated"	Britney Spears	3:17
5.	"He Blinded Me with Science"	Melissa Lefton	3:15
6.	"A.C.'s Alien Nation"	Aaron Carter	3:23
7.	"Kids in America"	No Secrets	3:07
8.	"The Answer to Our Life"	Backstreet Boys	3:17
9.	"The Chicken Dance"	Stupid	1:32
10.	"I Can Count on You"	True Vibe	3:46
11.	"We Got the Beat"	The Go-Go's	2:31
12.	"Go Jimmy Jimmy"	Aaron Carter	2:39
13.	"Parents Just Don't Understand (Bonus Mix)"	Lil' Romeo, 3LW, and Nick Cannon	3:52
14.	"Blitzkrieg Bop"	The Ramones	2:12
15.	"Jimmy Neutron Theme"	Bowling for Soup	2:08

=== Original Motion Picture Score ===
Jimmy Neutron: Boy Genius (Original Motion Picture Score) is the score album for the film, which contains the score composed by John Debney. The score, performed by the Hollywood Studio Symphony and conducted by Pete Anthony, was released for Academy Award consideration.

No.	Title	Artist	Length
1.	"Jimmy Neutron Theme"	Bowling for Soup	2:08
2.	"Leave It Up to Me"	Aaron Carter	2:59
3.	"Pop" (Deep Dish Cha-Ching Remix)	NSYNC	4:13
4.	"Parents Just Don't Understand"	Lil' Romeo, 3LW, and Nick Cannon	3:55
5.	"Intimidated"	Britney Spears	3:17
6.	"He Blinded Me With Science"	Melissa Lefton and The Matrix	3:15
7.	"A.C.'s Alien Nation"	Aaron Carter	3:23
8.	"Kids in America"	No Secrets	3:07
9.	"The Answer to Our Life"	Backstreet Boys	3:17
10.	"The Chicken Dance"	Stupid	1:32
11.	"I Can Count on You"	True Vibe	3:46
12.	"We Got the Beat"	The Go-Go's	2:31
13.	"Go Jimmy Jimmy"	Aaron Carter	2:39
14.	"Parents Just Don't Understand (Bonus Mix)"	Lil' Romeo, 3LW, and Nick Cannon	3:52
15.	"Blitzkrieg Bop"	The Ramones	2:12
16.	"Nickelodeon Logo"		0:14
17.	"Air Force"		1:00
18.	"Jimmy's Rocket Machine"		1:20
19.	"Parents"		1:17
20.	"Ready-to-Go-to-School Machine"		1:49
21.	"The Plan (Part 1)"		0:37
22.	"The Plan (Part 2)"		0:17
23.	"Nick"		0:50
24.	"The Worm"		0:20
25.	"RetroLand Theme Park"		0:40
26.	"Oyster & Diamond"		0:34
27.	"Alien Space Craft/Jimmy's Message"		3:02
28.	"Options"		0:49
29.	"Sneak Out"		1:09
30.	"Invasion Alert"		0:34
31.	"RetroLand Main"		0:14
32.	"Good Night"		0:58
33.	"Alien Abduction"		1:13
34.	"The Wish"		0:47
35.	"Say Goodbye/Angry Mob & 75/Launch"		7:07
36.	"Beauty of Space/Meteor"		2:25
37.	"The Alien Planet"		1:12
38.	"Flying Jimmy"		0:50
39.	"King Goobot's Shock"		0:20
40.	"Poultra: God of Wrath (Part 1)"		0:10
41.	"Poultra: God of Wrath (Part 2)"		0:20
42.	"Prisoners"		1:10
43.	"Cindy & Jimmy"		1:34
44.	"Ooblar's Danger/Cell Dog Phone/Rescue"		3:09
45.	"Stadium"		0:23
46.	"Bring out the Humans"		0:47
47.	"The Incubation"		0:48
48.	"Sacrifice"		0:29
49.	"The Plan"		1:40
50.	"Jimmy to the Rescue"		2:02
51.	"Escape from the Planet/The Big Chase"		2:42
52.	"Jimmy Is the Winner/Apologize"		2:15
53.	"The End"		0:13
Total length:			82:58

== Marketing and release ==
Jimmy Neutron: Boy Genius premiered at the Paramount studio lot on December 9, 2001, and was released in theaters on December 21, 2001, by Paramount Pictures. Promoting a film with the then-unknown Jimmy character was a challenge, as "kids like to go to the movies to see a friend". For that reason, Jimmy was presented as someone that children would like to spend time with. As part of the marketing campaign, a Jimmy Neutron website was created, and several tie-in deals were struck, including one with THQ for the development of a Game Boy Advance video game, and another with Jive Records, the label of artists such as Aaron Carter and Britney Spears (who are featured in the soundtrack).

A series of shorts were created to air on Nickelodeon, with the first one premiering on February 5, 2001. The shorts were tied in with online games available on Nick's website. Clips from the shorts were previously compiled to form a trailer, which was attached to the theatrical release of Rugrats in Paris: The Movie (2000). The shorts would later be included on the film's DVD release.

In April 2001, Nickelodeon Magazine launched a monthly Jimmy Neutron comic strip. An official trailer debuted two months later with the release of Lara Croft: Tomb Raider. The character Jimmy Neutron made appearances at the 2001 Kids' Choice Awards and appeared in commercials for Trident gum ahead of the film's premiere. Other promotional partners included RadioShack and Mattel, both of which produced toys based on the film. A "viral" campaign was also designed, consisting of Jimmy mischievously appearing during Nickelodeon shows – such as Rugrats, SpongeBob SquarePants and Taina – and altering them with his zapping device. The campaign began in September 2001, to further raise awareness of the film.

=== Home media ===
It was released on VHS and DVD by Paramount Home Entertainment on July 2, 2002. It was re-released on DVD twice, on June 22, 2011, and April 25, 2017. The film received a Blu-ray release on March 8, 2022.

== Reception ==
=== Critical response ===
On the review aggregator website Rotten Tomatoes, 74% of 76 critics' reviews are positive, with an average rating of 6.4/10. The website's consensus reads: "What Jimmy Neutron lacks in computer animation, it makes up for in charm and cleverness." Metacritic, which uses a weighted average, assigned the film a score of 65 out of 100, based on 21 critics, indicating "generally favorable" reviews. Audiences polled by CinemaScore gave the film an average grade of "A-" on an A+ to F scale.

Rita Kempley of The Washington Post praised the film, saying that "this little charmer both celebrates and kids the corny conventions of family sitcoms". Nell Minow of Common Sense Media enjoyed the "stylish 3-D computer animation, good characters", giving the film 3 out of 5 stars. Owen Gleiberman of Entertainment Weekly gave this film a grade of "B+", calling it "a lickety-split, madly packed, roller-coaster entertainment that might almost have been designed to make you scared of how much smarter your kids are than you". Paul Tatara of CNN called the film "the most delightfully original children's film of 2001". Roger Ebert of the Chicago Sun-Times gave the film three stars out of four, saying that "it doesn't have the little in-jokes that make Shrek and Monsters, Inc. fun for grown-ups. But adults who appreciate the art of animation may enjoy the look of the picture".

=== Box office ===
The film was financially successful, grossing $13,833,228 on its opening weekend in third place behind The Lord of the Rings: The Fellowship of the Ring and Ocean's Eleven and ended up with a total of $80,936,232 domestically, and the film did better overseas grossing $22,056,304 which made a total of $102,992,536 worldwide. It had a budget of roughly $30 million. It is one of only twenty feature films to be released in over 3,000 theaters and still improve on its box office performance in its second weekend, increasing 8.7% from $13,832,786 to $15,035,649.

=== Awards ===
Jimmy Neutron: Boy Genius was nominated for the first Academy Award for Best Animated Feature, losing to Shrek. It was the first release from Nickelodeon Movies to receive an Academy Award nomination.

== Expanded franchise ==
=== Television series ===
A sequel television series, The Adventures of Jimmy Neutron, Boy Genius, premiered on Nickelodeon on July 20, 2002. The series, taking place in Retroville, follows Jimmy Neutron, a boy genius who is often accompanied by his friends, Carl Wheezer and Sheen Estevez, with Jimmy's various inventions often going awry. It was produced by DNA Productions in association with O Entertainment. The series concluded on November 25, 2006, after three seasons.

==== Crossover specials ====
The Jimmy Timmy Power Hour, a trilogy of crossover television specials with The Fairly OddParents, aired between 2004 and 2006.

=== Spin-off series ===
A spin-off to Jimmy Neutron: Boy Genius, titled Planet Sheen, premiered on Nickelodeon on October 2, 2010. Produced by Omation Animation Studios, it focused on Sheen Estevez. The series concluded on February 15, 2013, after one season.

=== Simulator ride ===
A simulator ride called Jimmy Neutron's Nicktoon Blast opened at Universal Studios Florida on April 4, 2003, and operated until August 18, 2011. It was set after the events of the film and featured guest appearances by characters from the Nicktoons Hey Arnold!, Rugrats, The Fairly Oddparents and SpongeBob SquarePants.

=== Cancelled sequel ===
In February 2002, a sequel was reported in development for a summer 2004 release. Producer Albie Hecht reported to the Los Angeles Times that the sequel "would be made on the same budget as the first, but with a new batch of inventions and adventures in Jimmy's town of Retroville." On June 20, 2002, The Hollywood Reporter reported that writer Kate Boutilier had signed a writing deal with Nickelodeon Movies and Paramount Pictures to write a sequel to the film, but the sequel never materialized. The film was cancelled because the writers could not agree on a story and Alcorn later stated in an interview that "once the TV series came out, there wasn't a lot of incentive to make a movie when fans could simply watch Jimmy Neutron for free at home."

=== Future ===
In 2016, director John A. Davis stated that he has a story for a Jimmy Neutron reboot feature that he would like to make, but he is waiting for the "right situation" to make it.

When asked about a reboot in 2020, Rob Paulsen stated "Well, I've got to tell you, man. I go all over the world when we don't have the coronavirus, and people love Carl. They love Carl. I don't think it would be a bad thing at all to reboot Jimmy Neutron. I think that's one of those shows that a lot of people would love to see again. It was very good. Really smart. That wouldn't surprise me."

== See also ==
- List of films featuring extraterrestrials
