= Jimmy Neutron vs. Jimmy Negatron =

2002 video game

- Developers: Human Soft (GBA); AWE Games (PC)
- Publishers: THQ; Nick Games
- Composer: Andras Kover (GBA)
- Platforms: Microsoft Windows, Game Boy Advance
- Release: NA: September 9, 2002 (PC); NA: September 26, 2002 (GBA); PAL: February 7, 2003
- Genre: Action
- Mode: Single-player

Jimmy Neutron vs. Jimmy Negatron is a video game for Microsoft Windows and Game Boy Advance. In the game, the player plays as Jimmy Neutron as he always tries to stop his evil doppelganger, Jimmy Negatron, from his evil deeds. It was published by THQ and Nick Games and developed by AWE Games (PC) and Human Soft (GBA). The PC version contains a demo for SpongeBob SquarePants: Employee of the Month which was released around the same time.

== Gameplay ==
Similar to the PC version of the previous game, Jimmy Neutron vs. Jimmy Negatron is a third-person 3D video game which has gameplay largely consisting of puzzles and problem-solving, with Jimmy having to solve various puzzles to progress, such as gathering required items or passing obstacles. Besides puzzle solving, there are enemies that the player must avoid or battle with in boss fights to progress through certain locations. Throughout the game, the player primarily plays Jimmy Neutron, the protagonist.

== Plot ==
The beginning of the game takes place in a museum in Retroville. Mrs. Fowl is giving a tour of the museum and Jimmy is bored by "Mrs. Fowl's same old tour of the same old exhibits." Jimmy then exclaims "Can't anything ever be different?!"

In another dimension, evil Jimmy Negatron (an evil mirror dimension version of Jimmy Neutron) plots to conquer Neutron's world. Negatron commands his robot sidekick Hermin to hide in a broom closet while waiting for the right moment to strike.

Back at the museum, Jimmy builds a time machine to impress Cindy, but when he activates it with Goddard inside, they're teleported into cages in Negatron's underwater lair. Negatron reveals his plans to take over Retroville, then teleports back to Neutron's dimension where he tricks Cindy into drinking “Black Flurp” which he explains as a new and improved version of Purple Flurp.

Back in Negatron's dimension, Jimmy tricks Hermin into releasing him and Goddard, then pursues Negatron through the portal. The portal turns out to be booby-trapped and sends him to a soon to be flooded ravine instead. After escaping, Jimmy navigates through warehouses on a wharf and constructs a submarine. The two then travel through an underwater maze back to Negatron's lab. He fixes the portal and returns to Retroville. Realizing he's been tricked, Hermin declares himself "The Herminator" and follows Jimmy through the portal.

Back at the museum, Jimmy discovers that Negatron has replaced the computer exhibit's AI, Vox, with his own version, NegaVox. NegaVox. Jimmy restores Vox's backup and scans Retroville for threats, finding that the Vox system controlling his clubhouse has been infected.. Jimmy and Goddard are then sent inside Vox and must navigate a maze in a bug sprayer vehicle, destroying computer bugs and terminating energy beams to prevent Vox's corruption. Jimmy rescues Vox and Libby. Jimmy then enters his clubhouse to find Negatron has redecorated it. Vox informs Jimmy that Negatron used the time machine to alter the past. Jimmy goes back in time to battle Negatron throughout Retroville's neighborhood during Halloween, Winter, and Independence Day, ultimately restoring the timeline.

We then see Negatron giving Carl Black Flurp, causing him to grow large and rampage through downtown Retroville. Jimmy builds a food launcher, orders a large supply of food from Sporko Burgers, and flies around town feeding Carl until he returns to normal size.

In the museum's Egyptian Exhibit, Negatron tricks Mrs. Fowl into a sarcophagus and traps her atop a pyramid. Jimmy platforms across rafts in an oasis, weaves through sandstorms, and solves a sphinx’s color puzzles before climbing the pyramid to rescue her. Negatron subsequently tricks Judy and Hugh Neutron to the museum and traps them in sarcophagi inside the Tomb Exhibit. Jimmy navigates through falling floor tiles, obtains the first key, and discovers he needs two keys. In a second tomb, he escapes a rolling boulder, solves a water puzzle, and navigates through pendulums to obtain the second key. He frees his parents, who reveal Hugh has a not-so-secret, secret crate of Black Flurp hidden in the garage.

Using the information on crate, Jimmy is now able to locate and find Negatron's Black Flurp factory. At the factory, Negatron taunts Jimmy by having Cindy profess her love for him. Just before Jimmy can start destroying the Black Flurp, Hermin teleports in, but Jimmy defeats him and proceeds to destroy the Black Flurp production. Afterwards while Negatron monologues that he will simply produce more Black Flurp, Jimmy launches him into a vat of Purple Flurp. Jimmy gives Cindy Purple Flurp to counteract the Black Flurp, restoring her back to normal. She immediately berates Jimmy, much to his relief. Negatron reveals he's programmed the museum's mechanical dinosaurs to rampage through Retroville. Jimmy uses his rocket to launch water balloons causing the dinosaurs to short-circuit. Negatron teleports back with one final threat, but as soon as Negatron disappears once more, Jimmy reveals that had booby-trapped the teleporter. The game ends with Negatron is now trapped in a cage next to the Neutron mailbox.

== Reception ==
Reception

Aggregate score
| Aggregator | Score | |
| Aggregator | GBA | PC |
|---|---|---|
| Metacritic | 55/100 | |

Review scores
| Publication | Score | |
| Publication | GBA | PC |
|---|---|---|
| AllGame | 3.5/5 | 3/5 |
| GameZone | 6.5/10 | |
| IGN | 6/10 | |
| Nintendo Power | 2.4/5 | |

The Game Boy Advance version has a score of 55 out of 100 from Metacritic based on "mixed or average reviews". It was mostly praised for its graphics, which were considered to be above average at the time of its release.
