= The Adventures of Jimmy Neutron Boy Genius: Attack of the Twonkies =

2004 video game

- North American cover art
- Developers: THQ Studio Australia (PS2, GCN); Tantalus (GBA)
- Publisher: THQ
- Director: Roy Tessler
- Designer: Dave MacMinn
- Programmer: Matt Riek
- Artist: Steve Middleton
- Writer: Jed Spingarn
- Composer: Charlie Brissette
- Engine: RenderWare
- Platforms: Game Boy Advance; GameCube; PlayStation 2
- Release: Game Boy Advance: NA: September 14, 2004; AU: November 7, 2004; EU: February 4, 2005; GameCube & PlayStation 2: NA: September 14, 2004; AU: November 9, 2004; EU: February 11, 2005
- Genre: Action-adventure
- Mode: Single-player

The Adventures of Jimmy Neutron: Boy Genius: Attack of the Twonkies is a 2004 video game published by THQ. The game is based on the American animated series The Adventures of Jimmy Neutron, Boy Genius, specifically the special 2-part hour-long episode of the same name. The game was developed by THQ Studio Australia for the GameCube and PlayStation 2. A Game Boy Advance version was developed by Tantalus. A version for Xbox was also planned but was cancelled.

== Summary ==
In the game, the player controls Jimmy in a quest to save Earth from the alien "Twonkies" using gadgets and inventions. Although made after the Jimmy Neutron episode "Attack of the Twonkies!", levels are designed with the same mechanics as the film, including a rocket and the theme park "Retroland". The game starts with Jimmy in a classroom, and they talk about a comet coming in close orbit of the Earth, Jimmy takes a rocket ship there and ends up finding alien life, which he accidentally brings back with him. The game features multiple boss fights and features putting together random objects into one invention that assist in defeating bosses and collecting Twonkies.

== Reception ==
Reception

Aggregate scores
Aggregator	Score		
Aggregator	GBA	GameCube	PS2
GameRankings	52.67%	63.50%	69.40%
Metacritic	56/100	65/100	65/100

Review scores
Publication	Score		
Publication	GBA	GameCube	PS2
GameZone	N/A	7/10	6/10
IGN	N/A	6.5/10	6.5/10
Nintendo Power	2.5/5	2.4/5	N/A
Official U.S. PlayStation Magazine	N/A	N/A	3/5

The game received mixed or average reviews from critics; GameRankings gave it a score of 52.57% for the Game Boy Advance version, 63.50% for the Nintendo GameCube version, and 69.40% for the PlayStation 2 version; while Metacritic gave it a score of 56/100 for the GBA version and 65/100 for both the GameCube and PS2 versions.
