= The Adventures of Jimmy Neutron Boy Genius: Jet Fusion =

2003 video game

- North American GameCube cover art
- Developer: Krome Studios (Note: Helixe developed the Game Boy Advance version.)
- Publisher: THQ
- Platforms: GameCube; PlayStation 2 Game Boy Advance
- Release: GameCube, PlayStation 2: NA: September 16, 2003; EU: November 21, 2003; AU: December 26, 2003; Game Boy Advance: NA: September 24, 2003; EU: November 21, 2003; AU: January 4, 2004
- Genres: Action-adventure, platform
- Mode: Single-player

The Adventures of Jimmy Neutron: Boy Genius: Jet Fusion is a video game released in 2003 based on the CGI animated TV series The Adventures of Jimmy Neutron, Boy Genius. In the game, the player controls Jimmy Neutron who has to save the movie star/spy Jet Fusion by using a variety of gadgets and inventions. As the game was being developed by THQ, it inspired the television film Operation: Rescue Jet Fusion, which is also part of the TV series.

== Plot ==
Jimmy has an assignment to write a book report, and decides to invent the Virtual World Reproduction Machine (VWRM), a device that will visually show the book as a holographic movie. Jimmy places his Jet Fusion book into the machine and it malfunctions, thus turning Retroville into a virtual world. Then Professor Calamitous kidnaps Jet Fusion and it's up to Jimmy to save him. Throughout the game, the player has to collect pieces for major and minor inventions, which help Jimmy continue to the next level. The one major invention in each level helps defeat the boss in the boss level, while the one minor invention in each world helps Jimmy battle his enemies and various obstacles. The minor inventions also come with a primary and secondary action.

== Reception ==
Reception

Aggregate scores
Aggregator	Score		
Aggregator	GBA	GameCube	PS2
GameRankings	57.80%	63%	50.75%
Metacritic	61/100	60/100	50/100

Review scores
Publication	Score		
Publication	GBA	GameCube	PS2
Computer and Video Games	3.7/10	N/A	N/A
GameZone	6.9/10	7/10	5/10
IGN	5.5/10	6.1/10	6.1/10
NGC Magazine	N/A	71%	N/A
Nintendo Power	3/5	3.2/5	N/A
PlayStation Official Magazine – UK	N/A	N/A	5/10

The game received "mixed or average" reviews, according to review aggregator Metacritic. GameRankings gave it a score of 63% for the GameCube version, 50.75% for the PlayStation 2 version, and 57.80% for the Game Boy Advance version; while Metacritic gave it a score of 60 out of 100 for the GameCube version, 50 out of 100 for the PS2 version, and 61 out of 100 for the GBA version.
