= List of The Adventures of Jimmy Neutron, Boy Genius episodes =

The following is a list of all The Adventures of Jimmy Neutron, Boy Genius episodes. The series is based on the 2001 film Jimmy Neutron: Boy Genius.

== Series overview ==
Season	Episodes	Originally released	
Season	Episodes	First released	Last released
Pilot		September 7, 1998	
Film		December 21, 2001	
1	19	July 20, 2002	September 5, 2003
2	21	August 1, 2003	July 9, 2004
3	21	November 11, 2004	November 25, 2006
Specials	3	May 7, 2004	July 21, 2006

== Episodes ==
=== Pilot (1998) ===
Title	Directed by	Written by	Original release date
"Runaway Rocketboy!"	John A. Davis	John A. Davis & Steve Oedekerk; Story by: John A. Davis	September 7, 1998
Jimmy (voiced by Debi Derryberry) who was originally named Johnny Quasar, runs away after his parents ground him for launching Carl (voiced by Rob Paulsen) off the roof, but soon discovers King Goobot and his sidekick, Ooblar, trying to take over the world. While Hugh and Judy Neutron are talking about Jimmy returning home, Jimmy thwarts the Yolkians' plot, and returns home. The episode ends with Carl coming into the house and asking if he can use their toilet.

=== Film (2001) ===
Title	Directed by	Written by	Original release date
Jimmy Neutron: Boy Genius	John A. Davis	John A. Davis, Steve Oedekerk, J. David Stem & David N. Weiss; Story by: John A. Davis & Steve Oedekerk	December 21, 2001
Jimmy and his friends must rescue the parents after they are kidnapped and abducted by the Yolkians.

=== Season 1 (2002–03) ===
No. overall	No. in season	Title	Directed by	Written by	Original release date	Prod. code	Viewers (millions)
1	1	"When Pants Attack"	Keith Alcorn	Story by : Gordon Bressack & Charles M. Howell; Teleplay by : Steven Banks	July 20, 2002	001	2.60 (HH)
After being punished by his mother for not picking up his pants, Jimmy invents a chip that'll make his pants put themselves away so his punishment will be lifted. But after a malfunction, Jimmy's pants, along with Carl's pants, Sheen's pants, and Cindy's pants, start to walk on their own and plan to take over the world.
2a	2a	"Normal Boy"	Keith Alcorn	Jed Spingarn	September 6, 2002	002a	2.62 (HH)
Jimmy becomes a normal boy because his classmates are angered of how smart he is. However, his brain-draining invention glitches and instead causes him to become unintelligent and goofy, just when a meteorite is about to hit Earth. Jimmy's friends try to get him back to his genius self before the meteorite destroys Earth.
2b	2b	"Birth of a Salesman"	Keith Alcorn	Steven Banks	September 6, 2002	002b	2.62 (HH)
Jimmy invents an android salesman, the Willy Loman 3000, in order to win a candy-selling contest against Cindy. However his invention backfires when it starts selling anything and everything it can find, including Jimmy's stuff.
3a	3a	"Brobot"	Keith Alcorn	Written by : Evan Gore & Heather Lombard; Story by : John A. Davis	September 13, 2002	003a	4.43
When his friends are too busy to help him or hang out, Jimmy invents a little brother robot who soon becomes annoying.
3b	3b	"The Big Pinch"	Keith Alcorn	Jed Spingarn	September 13, 2002	003b	4.43
Wanting to prove Cindy wrong, Jimmy brings Thomas Edison to the present, but is unable to take him back when Edison falls for Ms. Fowl.
4a	4a	"Granny Baby"	Keith Alcorn	Written by : Andrew Nicholls & Darrell Vickers; Story by : John A. Davis	September 20, 2002	004a	2.41 (HH)
When Granny Neutron comes over while his parents are away, Jimmy creates a medicine that accidentally turns her into a baby and must look after her, with the help of Cindy, while simultaneously working on an antidote so he can change her back to normal before his parents return home.
4b	4b	"Time is Money"	Keith Alcorn	Steve Oedekerk	September 20, 2002	004b	2.41 (HH)
The Neutrons get rich after Jimmy goes back in time to convince his dad to invest in McSpanky's burger restaurant.
5a	5a	"Raise the Oozy Scab"	Mike Gasaway	Jed Spingarn	September 27, 2002	006a	2.34 (HH)
Jimmy, Carl, Sheen, and Cindy go underwater in a submarine to look for a treasure after Ms. Fowl makes Jimmy and Cindy partners for their project.
5b	5b	"I Dream of Jimmy"	Keith Alcorn	Andrew Nicholls & Darrell Vickers	September 27, 2002	006b	2.34 (HH)
Carl is having problems due to his nightmares and convinces Jimmy to go inside his dream to see what happens that makes him so scared.
6a	6a	"Jimmy on Ice"	Keith Alcorn & Mike Gasaway	Gene Grillo	October 4, 2002	005a	N/A
Jimmy freezes Retroville on a hot day, sending the town into a second ice age. He later must find a way to melt the large amounts of snow and ice.
6b	6b	"Battle of the Band"	Keith Alcorn	Spencer Green	October 4, 2002	005b	N/A
Jimmy, Carl, and Sheen form a rock band so they can beat Cindy and Libby in the school talent show, but their egos soon get out of control.
7a	7a	"See Jimmy Run"	Keith Alcorn	Butch Hartman & Steve Marmel	October 14, 2002	008a	2.20 (HH)
Wanting to beat Cindy in a relay race at their elementary school, Jimmy invents super shoes that make him run faster than anyone else. After Cindy tricks him into losing a sure-win at the race, Jimmy, seeking revenge, takes advantage of his shoes' invisibility effect to play pranks on the students, leading to trouble when he ends up stuck in fast running mode.
7b	7b	"Trading Faces"	Mike Gasaway	Andrew Nicholls & Darrell Vickers	October 14, 2002	008b	2.20 (HH)
Publicly humiliated by Cindy yet again, Jimmy comes up with an invention that will allow him to read her brain. But due to an unexpected power-surge, Jimmy and Cindy's brains swap bodies.
8a	8a	"The Phantom of Retroland"	Keith Alcorn	Andrew Nicholls & Darrell Vickers	October 30, 2002	007a	N/A
For his history report, Nick tells an urban legend about a child-eating phantom that haunts the town's amusement park, Retroland. Jimmy is skeptical, claiming it a hoax. Nick dares Jimmy to go there at midnight to see for himself. Jimmy accepts, recruiting Carl and Sheen to accompany him.
8b	8b	"My Son, the Hamster"	Mike Gasaway	Gene Grillo	October 30, 2002	007b	N/A
Jimmy's atoms accidentally get switched with Carl's hamster so he ends up with the body of a hamster, and the hamster with his body. Meanwhile, Hugh (unaware of the mishap) takes the hamster out for father-son bonding time.
9a	9a	"Hall Monster"	Mike Gasaway	Steven Banks	November 1, 2002	009a	2.48 (HH)
Jimmy becomes hall monitor, but takes it too far when he goes mad and abuses its power.
9b	9b	"Hypno Birthday to You"	Keith Alcorn	Darwin Vickers	November 1, 2002	009b	2.48 (HH)
Jimmy uses his Hypno-beam to hypnotize his parents into thinking it's his birthday the next day. The hypnotism does not wear off and so his parents believe his birthday is every day.
10a	10a	"Krunch Time"	Keith Alcorn	Evan Gore & Heather Lombard	November 15, 2002	010a	N/A
Jimmy invents a candy that everyone becomes addicted to, and the citizens of Retroville become enraged when he refuses to give them more of it.
10b	10b	"Substitute Creature"	Mike Gasaway	Darwin Vickers	November 15, 2002	010b	N/A
Jimmy brings a plant to school that accidentally turns Mrs. Fowl into a 50-foot tall, Godzilla-like creature.
11a	11a	"Safety First"	Mike Gasaway	Andrew Nicholls & Darrell Vickers	November 30, 2002	011a	N/A
A bully at school has been giving Jimmy a rough time and stealing his lunch so Jimmy creates an electronic bodyguard piloted by Nanobots. However, the Nanobots get a little overzealous and start to mistake his friends for bullies and his friends become petrified of him.
11b	11b	"Crime Sheen Investigation"	Keith Alcorn	Andrew Nicholls & Darrell Vickers	November 30, 2002	011b	N/A
Sheen is horrified to find one of his Ultra Lord action figures has gone missing and asks Jimmy to help. It is up to Jimmy to be the Sherlock Holmes of Retroville and find the action figure.
12a	12a	"Journey to the Center of Carl"	Keith Alcorn	Steven Banks	January 31, 2003	013a	2.55 (HH)
Jimmy invents a sick patch that is guaranteed to get the wearer out of having to attend school. It ends up making everyone sick when it dissolves, so Jimmy and Sheen go travel inside of Carl's stomach to fight his germs and create a vaccine.
12b	12b	"Aaughh!! Wilderness!!"	Mike Gasaway	Gene Grillo	January 31, 2003	013b	2.55 (HH)
Jimmy, Carl, and Sheen are camping with Hugh, who is allowing no technology whatsoever, but they run into a bear.
13a	13a	"Party at Neutron's"	Keith Alcorn	Steven Banks	February 17, 2003	014a	2.34 (HH)
Carl and Sheen convince Jimmy to throw a party while his parents are out.
13b	13b	"Ultra Sheen"	Keith Alcorn	Gene Grillo	February 17, 2003	014b	2.34 (HH)
Using Jimmy's newest invention, Sheen travels inside his favorite video game to meet his hero, Ultra Lord. But when he ends up losing on level one, Jimmy enters the video game to help him. Carl, not realizing that Sheen and Jimmy are really in the video game, puts them on a difficult level.
14a	14a	"Broadcast Blues"	Mike Gasaway	Gene Grillo	March 14, 2003	015a	N/A
Jimmy creates his own science TV show, which Cindy, Libby, and Brittany's dance show competes with.
14b	14b	"Professor Calamitous, I Presume"	Mike Gasaway	Steven Banks	March 14, 2003	015b	N/A
Professor Finbarr Calamitous, who can never finish anything, plots to take over Retroville, with some help from its resident boy genius. He steals Goddard and holds him for ransom in order to lure Jimmy into his trap.
15–16	15–16	"The Eggpire Strikes Back"	Mike Gasaway	Jed Spingarn	April 25, 2003	016-017	N/A
Jimmy's alien enemies, the Yolkians from the theatrical film, are back and pretend to be nice, but Jimmy suspects something is up. The town turns against him when he tries to convince everyone not to trust them. At the same time, the Yolkians trick Cindy into helping them in their evil plan to resurrect Poultra.
17a	17a	"Maximum Hugh"	Keith Alcorn	John Crane	May 17, 2003	012a	N/A
Jimmy invents a sweatband to help his dad perform better at the parent-child games to beat Cindy and her mom (which is her Aunt in disguise), only to get disqualified for cheating.
17b	17b	"Sleepless in Retroville"	Mike Gasaway	Steven Banks	May 17, 2003	012b	N/A
Jimmy invents a new sleepover machine when Carl and Sheen come over for the night. Things take a scary twist, however, when Carl accidentally creates a pizza monster from tampering with the machine for more pizza.
18	18	"Make Room for Daddy-O"	Keith Alcorn	Steven Banks	June 6, 2003	018	2.40 (HH)
After being embarrassed by Hugh at rehearsals for the Father's Day talent show, Jimmy uses an invention that changes Hugh from weird to cool. However, the more famous Hugh becomes, the less time he spends with Jimmy and the more Jimmy begins to miss the old Hugh.
19	19	"Beach Party Mummy"	Keith Alcorn	Steven Banks	September 19, 2003	023	N/A
Feeling bored over a documentary of mummies at school, Jimmy takes Carl, Sheen, Cindy, and Libby on an adventurous trip to Egypt to find the ruins of the lost tomb of Queen Hazabataslapya, only to discover she's actually Libby's ancestor.

=== Season 2 (2003–04) ===
No. overall	No. in season	Title	Directed by	Written by	Original release date	Prod. code
20	1	"A Beautiful Mine"	Mike Gasaway	Gene Grillo	August 1, 2003	021
Jimmy, Carl, Sheen, Cindy, and Libby search for rare diamonds on an asteroid, but become extremely greedy very soon after. Things get worse when aliens on the same asteroid plan to vaporize them.
21	2	"Sorry, Wrong Era"	Keith Alcorn	Gene Grillo	September 5, 2003	022
Jimmy has invented a Time Replay Remote, which he uses as part of a prank pulled on Cindy and Libby. However, Hugh sees the invention and, in borrowing it to see how it works very well, accidentally sends Jimmy, Carl and Sheen back 200 million years. Now, the boys must work to avoid the prehistoric dinosaurs and get back to the present. Meanwhile, Hugh begins experimenting himself going forward and reverse in time with the Remote, thus annoying the people of Retroville.
22a	3a	"The Retroville 9"	Keith Alcorn	Steven Banks	October 3, 2003	026a
Jimmy's determination to captain a winning baseball team leads him to rev up the equipment with Neutronic technology.
22b	3b	"Grumpy Young Men"	Keith Alcorn	Andrew Nicholls & Darrell Vickers	October 3, 2003	026b
Jimmy, Carl, and Sheen attempt to turn themselves to be 18 years old in order to buy an M-rated video game. But due to a malfunction, they turn into senior citizens and they have to get back to their original ages before they turn to dust.
23–24	4–5	"Operation: Rescue Jet Fusion"	Mike Gasaway	Steven Banks	October 13, 2003	024-025
Jimmy is recruited by a top-secret government agency to become a spy, but what's even more thrilling is joining forces with his favorite action-hero movie star, Jet Fusion, in an effort to save the world from the villainous Professor Finbarr Calamitous and his daughter, Beautiful Gorgeous. Note: This one-hour episode has a special theme in the beginning.
25	6	"Nightmare in Retroville"	Mike Gasaway	Steven Banks	October 29, 2003	028
Jimmy creates a device that turns his friends into actual horror film monsters for Halloween costumes.
26a	7a	"Monster Hunt"	Mike Gasaway	Gene Grillo	November 11, 2003	029a
A rumor spreads that a lake monster is terrorizing Retroville, but Jimmy decides to prove that it doesn't exist.
26b	7b	"Jimmy for President"	Mike Gasaway	Steven Banks	November 11, 2003	029b
Jimmy runs for class president against Libby, Sheen and foreign exchange student Bolbi, and Carl ends up being forced by each of them to vote for them.
27	8	"Return of the Nanobots"	Mike Gasaway	Gene Grillo	November 14, 2003	027
The Nanobots escape from Jimmy's lab and wreak havoc by "deleting" the citizens of Retroville and trapping them in a virtual trash bin.
28	9	"Holly Jolly Jimmy"	Mike Gasaway	Gene Grillo	December 8, 2003	020
Jimmy is determined to prove that Santa Claus does not exist, and in doing so puts the future of Christmas in jeopardy.
29	10	"Love Potion #976/J"	Keith Alcorn	Gene Grillo	February 13, 2004	019
Jimmy creates a love potion for his friends that makes them fall in love with the first person they see: Jimmy falls for Cindy, - Carl for Jimmy's Mom - Judy, - and Sheen for Libby.
30	11	"Sheen's Brain"	Mike Gasaway	Jed Spingarn	March 8, 2004	032
After Sheen fails a history test, Jimmy increases Sheen's brain to be larger and smarter. However, Sheen becomes evil and angry with power with his new supreme mental abilities, and proclaims himself king. Jimmy and Carl must stop Sheen from taking over Retroville and the entire planet.
31a	12a	"MaternoTron Knows Best"	Keith Alcorn	Andrew Nicholls & Darrell Vickers	March 9, 2004	033a
Feeling tensed and unappreciated around the house, Judy takes a week off at a spa, leading to Jimmy inventing a replacement robo-mother. Things go awry when the robo-mother thinks she's actually Judy and causes trouble around the house.
31b	12b	"Send in the Clones"	Keith Alcorn	Steven Banks	March 9, 2004	033b
To avoid his chores, Jimmy makes clones of himself, including an optimist, a pessimist, a tough-talker, a French romantic, a comedian, and an evildoer. However, the clones cause trouble in Retroville rather than doing his chores, with the real Jimmy taking the blame.
32a	13a	"The Great Egg Heist"	Mike Gasaway	Gene Grillo	March 10, 2004	034a
Jimmy, Carl, Sheen, Cindy, and Libby infiltrate a museum in order to retrieve a precious egg which belongs to a princess.
32b	13b	"The Feud"	Mike Gasaway	Gene Grillo	March 10, 2004	034b
After Hugh and Carl's dad get into an argument over Hugh's LawnLopper, Jimmy and Carl are forbidden to see one another. Judy attempts to fix the feud, but gets into an argument with Carl's mom. After saving Jimmy, Carl, and Sheen from the plant monsters, the feud ends. It's revealed that Hugh lent his LawnLopper to Sam at the Candy Bar and Sheen forgot to tell him.
33	14	"Out, Darn Spotlight"	Mike Gasaway	Steven Banks	March 11, 2004	035
Jimmy joins his school play, "MacBeth in Space" to spend more time with his crush, Betty Quinlan. However, he only makes the special effects for the show and Nick is assigned the lead role. When Nick hurts himself skateboarding, Jimmy rushes to save the play and takes Nick's place as the lead role.
34	15	"The Junkman Cometh"	Mike Gasaway	Steven Banks	March 12, 2004	036
Brobot lures Jimmy, Carl, and Sheen to the moon by faking being in danger. After the boys return to Earth, Brobot tells Jimmy that an alien called the Junkman captured his parents, but Jimmy does not believe him. Eventually, Jimmy, Carl, and Sheen are also captured by the Junkman.
35a	16a	"Foul Bull"	Keith Alcorn & Kirby Atkins	Andrew Nicholls & Darrell Vickers	March 26, 2004	037a
Miss Fowl takes her students on a trip to a rodeo, where Jimmy, Carl, and Sheen fall for a cowgirl named Sally. Wanting to impress her, the boys become rodeo stars.
35b	16b	"The Science Fair Affair"	Keith Alcorn & Kirby Atkins	John P. McCann	March 26, 2004	037b
Jimmy is banned from the school science fair after Cindy convinces Principal Willoughby that he is too smart to compete.
36	17	"Men at Work"	Mike Gasaway	Andrew Nicholls & Darrell Vickers	June 2, 2004	038
Jimmy's newest invention requires pure gold, but when the gold for his invention is destroyed, Jimmy, Carl, and Sheen get jobs at McSpanky's burger factory. Management's unfair treatment of Jimmy drives him to revamp the whole restaurant by making it automatic and hygienic.
37a	18a	"The Mighty Wheezers"	Keith Alcorn & Kirby Atkins	Gene Grillo	June 7, 2004	039a
Jimmy's parents are on vacation for the week and Jimmy is left with Carl's family. Jimmy gives them a pill which makes them super strong and go out to have fun.
37b	18b	"Billion Dollar Boy"	Keith Alcorn & Kirby Atkins	Gene Grillo	June 7, 2004	039b
Jimmy meets and beats the richest kid in Retroville, Eustace Strych, in the Battlekite Flyoffs. Having had his pride wounded, Eustace invites Jimmy and his friends over to his mansion, with evil intentions.
38–40	19–21	"Win, Lose and Kaboom!"	Mike Gasaway	Jed Spingarn & Steven Banks & Gene Grillo	July 9, 2004	040-042
After the town of Retroville receives a space rock with a message on it, Jimmy is determined to decode the message. After he figures out the message, which is sort of a riddle, Jimmy, and his friends are kidnapped into outer space where they're forced to compete in an intergalactic game show, hosted by Meldar Prime (voiced by Tim Allen), in which the losers get their home planets destroyed. With the help of one of the competitors, which is an alien female warrior named April (voiced by Alyssa Milano), they plan to win the competition, not only to save the Earth, but other planets as well.

=== Season 3 (2004–06) ===
No. overall	No. in season	Title	Directed by	Written by	Original release date	Prod. code
41–42	1–2	"Attack of the Twonkies"	Keith Alcorn	Jed Spingarn	November 11, 2004	030-031
Jimmy visits a comet, and while harvesting dust from the comet's surface accidentally brings a small fluffy alien life-form back to Earth. Carl brings the alien, which he calls a "Twonkie", to class, and it produces multiple off-springs. Everyone finds the Twonkies irresistibly adorable and adopts one. However, when the Twonkies hear music they morph into grotesque and vicious monsters. Jimmy and the citizens of Retroville must stop and capture the dangerous rampaging Twonkies and send them back to their comet before it leaves Earth's orbit. Note: This one-hour episode has a special theme in the beginning.
43	3	"Lights! Camera! Danger!"	Keith Alcorn	Steven Banks	November 27, 2004	045
Jimmy, Carl, Sheen, Cindy, and Libby join a movie cast with a demanding director named Quentin Smithee, Professor Calamitous in disguise, who is plotting to do away with Jimmy and his friends, and when Hugh is hired as "Donut Boy", he simply does not get the point that he will not be in the film.
44	4	"Fundemonium"	Mike Gasaway	Tom Sheppard	May 24, 2005	044
After losing his job, in order to stay in Retroville, Hugh makes a fortune creating a brand of toys that Jimmy secretly modifies in his lab before his father presents the prototypes to the toy company. However, Hugh takes the Nanobots after mistaking them for batteries and using them for one of his toys. Once inside the toy, the Nanobots plot to destroy Retroville.
45	5	"Stranded"	Keith Alcorn	Jed Spingarn	May 26, 2005	047
After an argument between Jimmy and Cindy about the equator, the gang travels in Jimmy's hover car over there. Jimmy and Cindy fall out of the hover car and into the water while arguing and become stranded on a deserted island, where they seem to develop feelings for each other without the stress of their everyday lives in the way. Carl, Sheen, and Libby try to turn off the auto-pilot and find their friends somewhere in the water.
46	6	"Jimmy Goes to College"	Mike Gasaway	Gene Grillo	May 27, 2005	048
Jimmy's grades are so great that he is allowed to skip original school and go directly to college. But Jimmy becomes the unwitting target of another student named Seymour Nimmelfarb who is jealous of Jimmy's intelligence and wants to get rid of him and get him expelled.
47	7	"The N-Men"	Mike Gasaway	Gene Grillo	November 27, 2004	054
While returning from a space voyage, Jimmy and his friends get zapped by the Van Pattern Radiation Belt and gain superpowers. Cindy gains super-strength, Sheen gains super-speed, Libby gains invisibility, and Carl can produce sonic belches. Jimmy simply turns orange and seems to lack powers entirely, resulting in his friends and the townspeople mocking him. However, when Jimmy loses control of his temper due to Cindy's relentless insults, he turns into an orange Hulk-like monster and begins on a rampage in Retroville by causing havoc. His friends must figure how to reverse his hulking transformation so he can save them and himself from radiation poisoning.
48	8	"The Tomorrow Boys"	Keith Alcorn	Christopher Painter	May 23, 2005	043
After traveling into the future, Jimmy, Carl and Sheen find out Libby is the future dictator of the world after Libby sprays Jimmy's new chemical that makes any living thing it touches angry with her power.
49	9	"My Big Fat Spy Wedding"	Mike Gasaway	Steven Banks	July 22, 2005	058
Jimmy tries to stop Jet Fusion from marrying a criminal, Beautiful Gorgeous, the daughter of Professor Calamitous.
50a	10a	"Who's Your Mommy?"	Mike Gasaway	Christopher Painter	June 20, 2005	046a
Carl gets infected by a "face-hugging" alien parasite, and becomes pregnant with an electric space jellyfish baby.
50b	10b	"Clash of the Cousins"	Mike Gasaway	Gene Grillo	June 20, 2005	046b
Jimmy and his parents go to a family reunion celebrating great Aunt Amanda's birthday. When his presents end up exploding, he is blamed and outcast. Someone within the family is attempting to destroy the others, and now Jimmy must prove his innocence, expose the evil genius, and save the reunion with the help of Carl and Sheen and his Cousin Gomer.
51	11	"Crouching Jimmy, Hidden Sheen"	Mike Gasaway	Jed Spingarn	November 18, 2005	050
Libby is kidnapped by Yoo Yee, a Kung-Fu warrior who wants Sheen's position as the Chosen One, and Sheen must learn kung fu to save Libby.
52	12	"The Incredible Shrinking Town"	Keith Alcorn	Steven Banks	January 23, 2006	049
Jimmy accidentally shrinks the whole town of Retroville. And the Space Bandits capture the citizens and try to sell them as toys to alien children.
53a	13a	"One of Us"	Keith Alcorn	Steven Banks	January 24, 2006	051a
When a show called "The Happy Show Show", hosted by Grandma Taters, hypnotizes everyone in Retroville, Jimmy and Cindy must stop her before the whole world becomes happy, mindless zombies.
53b	13b	"Vanishing Act"	Keith Alcorn	Christopher Painter	January 24, 2006	051b
Jimmy buys a magic kit and puts on a show to impress Betty Quinlan. Jealous, Cindy tampers with the machine, which causes Jimmy, Carl, Sheen, Cindy, and Betty to be sucked into multi-dimensional space.
54	14	"The Trouble with Clones"	Mike Gasaway	Gene Grillo	January 25, 2006	052
Jimmy tracks down his evil clone once again and attempts to turn him good, but the clone has other ideas. Evil Jimmy creates a dark matter chip, producing a corrupted clone of Earth; the real Earth and everyone living on it are at risk of fading into oblivion. Jimmy must stop his evil clone's plan before it is too late.
55a	15a	"The Evil Beneath"	Keith Alcorn	Tom Sheppard	January 26, 2006	053a
Jimmy, Carl, and Sheen are trapped in Dr. Moist's lair, who captures innocent tourists and turns them into Algae Men by inviting them to eat food with him. When they eat the green algae seeds, they turn green and into Algae Men, which explains the mysterious disappearances in the Bahama Quadrangle.
55b	15b	"Carl Wheezer: Boy Genius"	Keith Alcorn	Steven Banks	January 26, 2006	053b
Carl wants to impress a girl by pretending to be a genius, and making Jimmy seem unintelligent in comparison to him.
56a	16a	"Who Framed Jimmy Neutron?"	Keith Alcorn	Steven Banks	January 27, 2006	055a
Jimmy is arrested for his crimes he did not commit and goes to prison along with Carl and Sheen and Jimmy must clear his name for something that he did not do with the help of a local hillbilly.
56b	16b	"Flippy"	Keith Alcorn	Jed Spingarn	January 27, 2006	055b
Worried that his dad can embarrass him at school, Jimmy installs a chip in Hugh's ventriloquist dummy that makes him tell good jokes. But when Flippy the dummy begins to malevolently possess Hugh and drain his brain, Jimmy must save his dad and change Flippy back to normal.
57	17	"King of Mars"	Mike Gasaway	Gene Grillo	November 25, 2006	056
Eustace returns, and he's still determined to humiliatingly defeat Jimmy by racing to find a hidden energy source on Mars.
58a	18a	"El Magnifico"	Keith Alcorn	Christopher Painter	November 25, 2006	057a
After he is worried that his son loves Ultra Lord more than him, Sheen's dad begs Jimmy to turn him into a superhero to impress his son.
58b	18b	"Best in Show"	Keith Alcorn	Steven Banks	November 25, 2006	057b
Jimmy enters Goddard in a pet contest, and because he's a machine rather than an organic flesh and blood dog, he gets disqualified. Feeling humiliated and sorry, Goddard runs away from home. Now Jimmy, Carl, and Sheen try to find him.
59a	19a	"How to Sink a Sub"	Keith Alcorn	Gene Grillo	November 17, 2006	059a
When Jimmy sends the teachers into Hyperspace for a week and the whole school gets the place to themselves, things get a lot worse. Jimmy, Carl, and Sheen's parents are substitutes, and they embarrass them. Jimmy tries to build a raging hormone bottle to rebel against the parents, but the parents drink it instead and run amok through the school.
59b	19b	"Lady Sings the News"	Keith Alcorn	Jed Spingarn	November 17, 2006	059b
The kids become anchors for a kids news program. When Libby starts abusing her gossip segment, her friends must plot to stop her from invading the privacy of the rest of the town.
60–61	20–21	"The League of Villains"	Mike Gasaway	Steven Banks	June 18, 2005	060-061
King Goobot is back again, and recruits every villain Jimmy has ever defeated to be part of his new army to get revenge on him.

=== Specials (2004–06) ===
No.	Title	Directed by	Written by	Original release date
1	"The Jimmy Timmy Power Hour"	Keith Alcorn & Butch Hartman	Story by : Rico Hall; Written by : Gene Grillo, Butch Hartman & Steve Marmel	May 7, 2004
Jimmy Neutron and Timmy Turner end up in each other's worlds and must work together with the other's group of friends to return things back to normal.
2	"The Jimmy Timmy Power Hour 2: When Nerds Collide!"	Keith Alcorn, Mike Gasaway & Butch Hartman	Story by : Gene Grillo, Steve Marmel, Jed Spingarn & Jack Thomas; Written by : Gene Grillo & Steve Marmel	January 16, 2006
Jimmy and Timmy fight over Cindy, while also attempting to save Dimmsdale from the Anti-Fairies and Retroville from Professor Calamitous. For the first time, Jimmy's friends end up in Dimmsdale instead of just Jimmy, and Timmy's fairies end up in Retroville instead of just Timmy.
3	"The Jimmy Timmy Power Hour 3: The Jerkinators!"	Keith Alcorn, Mike Gasaway & Butch Hartman	Steve Marmel & Jed Spingarn	July 21, 2006
Jimmy and Timmy join forces to save both of their universes from getting destroyed by an evil monster of their own creation.

== Home media ==
Region 1
Title	Season(s)	Episode count	Release date	Episodes
Confusion Fusion	1	9	May 27, 2003	"When Pants Attack", "Normal Boy", "Birth of a Salesman", "Brobot", "The Big Pinch", "Granny Baby", "Time is Money", "Jimmy on Ice", and "Battle of the Band"
Sea of Trouble	1	10	October 7, 2003	"Raise the Oozy Scab", "The Phantom of Retroland", "Hypno Birthday to You", "Hall Monster", "Trading Faces", "Journey to the Center of Carl", "I Dream of Jimmy", "Substitute Creature", "Broadcast Blues", and "Professor Calamitous, I Presume"
Jet Fusion	1, 2	7	February 3, 2004	"Operation: Rescue Jet Fusion", "My Son, the Hamster", "See Jimmy Run", "Krunch Time", "Safety First", "The Retroville 9", and "Grumpy Young Men"
Jimmy Timmy Power Hour	1, 2	4	May 11, 2004	The first Jimmy Timmy Power Hour, "Crime Sheen Investigation", "Sleepless in Retroville", and "Maximum Hugh"
Attack of the Twonkies	1–3	4	November 16, 2004	"Attack of the Twonkies", "Send in the Clones", "A Beautiful Mine", and "The Junkman Cometh"
Nick Picks Vol. 1	2	1	May 24, 2005	The first Jimmy Timmy Power Hour
Nick Picks Vol. 2	1	1	October 18, 2005	"Sleepless in Retroville"
Nick Picks Vol. 3	1	1	February 7, 2006	"Brobot"
Jimmy Timmy Power Hour 2	1–3	3	March 14, 2006	"Jimmy Timmy Power Hour 2: When Nerds Collide!", "I Dream of Jimmy", and "Nightmare in Retroville"
Nick Picks Vol. 4	1	1	June 6, 2006	"The Big Pinch"
Jimmy Timmy Power Hour 3	1–3	3	July 25, 2006	"Jimmy Timmy Power Hour 3: The Jerkinators!", "Ultra Sheen", and "The Feud"
Nick Picks Vol. 5	3	1	March 13, 2007	"The Trouble with Clones"
The Best of Season 1	1	16	September 10, 2008	"Brobot", "The Big Pinch", "Normal Boy", "Birth of a Salesman", "Raise the Oozy Scab", "I Dream of Jimmy", "The Eggpire Strikes Back", "Broadcast Blues", "Professor Calamitous, I Presume", "Hall Monster", "Hypno Birthday to You", "My Son, the Hamster", "Granny Baby", "Time is Money", "Krunch Time", and "Substitute Creature"
The Best of Season 2	1, 2	14	September 16, 2008	"Nightmare in Retroville", "Sheen's Brain", "MaternoTron Knows Best", "Send in the Clones", "The Great Egg Heist", "The Feud", "The Retroville 9", "Grumpy Young Men", "A Beautiful Mine", "Return of the Nanobots", "Out, Darn Spotlight", "The Junkman Cometh", "Foul Bull", and "The Science Fair Affair"
The Best of Season 3	3	13	September 16, 2008	"Lights! Camera! Danger!", "Crouching Jimmy, Hidden Sheen", "The Incredible Shrinking Town", "One of Us", "Vanishing Act", "Fundemonium", "The Tomorrow Boys", "Who's Your Mommy?", "Clash of the Cousins", "Jimmy Goes to College", "The N-Men", "The Evil Beneath", and "Carl Wheezer: Boy Genius"
The Complete Series	1–3	55	October 26, 2021	All 55 episodes and all 3 specials
