= The Jimmy Timmy Power Hour =

Nickelodeon television specials

- Title card for the first special
- Genre: Crossover; Action; Adventure; Comedy; Fantasy
- Created by: John A. Davis; Butch Hartman
- Based on: Jimmy Neutron: Boy Genius by John A. Davis The Fairly OddParents by Butch Hartman
- Written by: Gene Grillo (1–2); Butch Hartman (1); Steve Marmel (1–3); Jed Spingarn (3)
- Story by: Rico Hill (1); Gene Grillo (2); Steve Marmel (2); Jed Spingarn (2); Jack Thomas (2)
- Directed by: Keith Alcorn (1–3); Mike Gasaway (2–3); Butch Hartman (1–3)
- Voices of: Debi Derryberry; Rob Paulsen; Carolyn Lawrence; Jeffrey Garcia; Crystal Scales; Tara Strong; Daran Norris; Susanne Blakeslee; Frank Welker; Carlos Alazraqui
- Theme music composer: Guy Moon; Charlie Brissette
- Composers: Guy Moon (Fairly OddParents sequences); Charlie Brissette (Jimmy Neutron sequences)
- Country of origin: United States
- Original language: English
- No. of episodes: 3 (list of episodes)

Production
- Executive producers: Butch Hartman; Steve Oedekerk; Fred Seibert
- Producers: Keith Alcorn; Bob Boyle; John A. Davis; Steve Marmel; Paul Marshal
- Running time: 49 minutes
- Production companies: O Entertainment; DNA Productions; Frederator Incorporated; Nickelodeon Animation Studio

Original release
- Network: Nickelodeon
- Release: May 7, 2004 – July 21, 2006

The Jimmy Timmy Power Hour is an American trilogy of crossover television specials between the animated television series The Adventures of Jimmy Neutron, Boy Genius and The Fairly OddParents. Consisting of The Jimmy Timmy Power Hour, the special has provided two sequels with subtitles, When Nerds Collide! and The Jerkinators!. The specials premiered on Nickelodeon between 2004 and 2006, and were subsequently released to home video. They combine multiple types of animation, using traditional animation for the segments set in the Fairly OddParents universe and 3D computer animation for the Jimmy Neutron segments. In these specials, Timmy is sent to Retroville by wishing for the greatest laboratory in the universe for his science project. But he meets Jimmy, who repairs his robot dog Goddard. They swap places accidentally, and things go wrong because Jimmy and Timmy miscommunicate with them. It's up to them to save the universes. The events of the crossover take place during the second and third seasons of The Adventures of Jimmy Neutron, Boy Genius and the fourth and fifth seasons of The Fairly OddParents.

== Plot ==
=== The Jimmy Timmy Power Hour (2004) ===
Struggling with his science project, Timmy Turner wishes that he could be sent to the best laboratory in any universe. When his fairy godparents, Cosmo and Wanda, fulfill this wish, Timmy is sent to the town of Retroville in the universe of child prodigy Jimmy Neutron. Jimmy is sent to Dimmsdale in Timmy's universe when he accidentally activates a magical transporter created by Cosmo and Wanda. As they attempt to return to their respective worlds, Jimmy and Timmy meet the various side characters of each universe and Timmy becomes romantically involved with Jimmy's classmate, Cindy Vortex. While messing around in Jimmy's lab, Timmy accidentally turns Goddard, Jimmy's robotic dog, into a giant, violent monster from a video game he was playing called the Decimator. Timmy manages to stop Goddard from destroying Retroville, but is contacted by Jimmy, who tells him that Mr. Crocker, Timmy's fairy-obsessed teacher, has stolen the transporter, allowing him to take over Fairy World. Crocker is defeated by Jimmy. Both Jimmy and Timmy manage to return to their own universes. Back in Dimmsdale, Timmy realizes that he never finished his project, but at the last second, Jimmy teleports Goddard to the science fair, allowing Timmy to win.

=== The Jimmy Timmy Power Hour 2: When Nerds Collide! (2006) ===
Jimmy and Timmy enter each other's worlds for a second time, both wanting to ask Cindy out to their school dance celebrating Friday the 13th. In an attempt to gain Cindy's affections, the two engage in a battle of smarts that sends Jimmy and his friends to Dimmsdale. As Timmy seeks to prove that Jimmy is a fraudulent scientist, Cosmo and Wanda struggle to keep their existence a secret from the people of Retroville. Meanwhile, Professor Calamitous, a major villain in Jimmy's universe, unleashes a surge of anti-fairies from Fairy World that threatens the rotation of Timmy's Earth. Jorgen Von Strangle, the powerful fairy commander and enforcer of Da Rules, gets increasingly frustrated by both Jimmy and Timmy's friends and their manipulation of fairy magic. In addition, Jorgen is forced to work with Calamitous after he is betrayed by the leader of the anti-fairies, Anti-Cosmo.

=== The Jimmy Timmy Power Hour 3: The Jerkinators! (2006) ===
In their third and final encounter, Jimmy and Timmy make amends while trying to defeat the enemies from their own universes—including a monster that they concoct together—while purposefully rejecting their respective friends in the process, including Cindy. Initially, they are unable to make the monster evil enough to fight them properly, but when they succeed, he almost immediately turns against them and absorbs Cosmo and Wanda's magic and Jimmy's intelligence, and then begins destroying both children's universes.

== Voice cast ==
- Debi Derryberry as Jimmy Neutron
- Rob Paulsen as Carl Wheezer, Eustace Strych, Bucky McBadbat, Butler, Announcer, and Anti-Fairy Walla
- Carolyn Lawrence as Cindy Vortex and Mrs. Folfax
- Jeffrey Garcia as Sheen Estevez and Anti-Fairy Walla
- Crystal Scales as Libby Folfax
- Tara Strong as Timmy Turner and School Girl
- Daran Norris as Cosmo, Anti-Cosmo, Mr. Turner, and Jorgen Von Strangle
- Susanne Blakeslee as Wanda, Anti-Wanda, Mrs. Turner, and Anti-Fairy #1
- Jason Marsden as Chester McBadBat
- Grey DeLisle as Vicky and Principal Waxelplax
- Mark DeCarlo as Hugh Neutron
- Megan Cavanagh as Judy Neutron
- Gary LeRoi Gray as A.J.
- Carlos Alazraqui as Mr. Crocker and Mayor of Dimmsdale
- Dee Bradley Baker as Sanjay, Elmer, Binky Abdul, and Fairy Guard #1
- Jim Ward as Tour Guide, Chet Ubetcha, and Anti-Fairy #2
- Faith Abrahams as Francis
- Kevin Michael Richardson as Morgan Freeman and Anti-Fairy Walla
- Tim Curry as Professor Calamitous
- Jeff Bennett as Dr. Sydney Moist
- Jeff Garlin as Villain ("Shirley")
- Frank Welker as Goddard and Special Vocal effects
- Billy West as Sam Melvick, Corky Shimatzu, Blix, and British Official
- Jay Leno as Nega-Chin
- Chris Kirkpatrick as Chip Skylark (archive footage)

== Production ==
The first draft of the screenplay was completed in January 2003.

Each special in the Jimmy Timmy Power Hour series combines the 2D hand-drawn traditional animation of the Fairly OddParents and the 3D computer-generated imagery animation of The Adventures of Jimmy Neutron, Boy Genius. This blending of animation techniques was a technical challenge for the studios responsible for both series, according to Keith Alcorn, co-founder of series producer DNA Productions.

== Release and reception ==
According to Variety, the first episode was seen by nearly five million viewers on its Nickelodeon premiere, on May 7, 2004. Terry Kelleher of People gave the first special three stars out of four, calling it a "blast of creativity" although hard to follow. The Washington Post similarly gave it praise. In his review of the DVD release, John Sinnott of DVD Talk called the first special "an above-average extra-long episode." He also praised the "funny gags" for "[Jimmy and Timmy] poke fun at each other's setting and basically have a good time." The network considered it a success.

The second episode, aired January 16, 2006, was seen by nearly 5.5 million viewers, according to The New York Times.

The third and final episode aired July 21, 2006. It serves as the series finale for The Adventures of Jimmy Neutron, Boy Genius. It was also intended to be the series finale of The Fairly OddParents, until season six of that series was ordered for production by Nickelodeon.

In 2020, Screen Rant ranked the trilogy specials at "Nickelodeon: 5 Best Original Movies (& 5 You Totally Forgot About)". In 2024, Game Rant ranked it at number nine of "9 Best Nickelodeon Cartoon Crossovers".

== See also ==
- List of Nickelodeon original films
- Nicktoons: Attack of the Toybots
- Nicktoons: Freeze Frame Frenzy
- SpongeBob SquarePants Featuring Nicktoons: Globs of Doom
- Nicktoons: Battle for Volcano Island
- Nicktoons Unite!
