= DNA Productions =

Defunct American animation studio

DNA Productions, Inc.
- Final logo, used from 2002 to 2006
- Type: Television and film company
- Industry: Animation
- Predecessor: K & H Productions
- Founded: 1987; 39 years ago
- Founders: John A. Davis; Keith Alcorn
- Defunct: 2006; 20 years ago
- Fate: Closure
- Successor: Omation Animation Studio
- Headquarters: Irving, Texas, U.S.
- Products: Jimmy Neutron: Boy Genius; The Adventures of Jimmy Neutron, Boy Genius; Olive, the Other Reindeer; Santa vs. the Snowman; The Ant Bully; Cartoon Sushi
- Website: dnahelix.com (archived 2024-07-31 from the original)

DNA Productions, Inc. was an American animation studio and production company based in Irving, Texas. It was founded in 1987 by John A. Davis and Keith Alcorn. The studio originally worked on miscellaneous projects for other companies, including commercials and corporate videos, before branching out to television and film animation.

DNA Productions began to thrive a decade after its formation, through a partnership with filmmaker Steve Oedekerk. The studio's first major projects, Santa vs. the Snowman and Cartoon Sushi, were released in 1997. Other projects soon followed, including Olive, the Other Reindeer in 1999.

DNA Productions is best known for its Jimmy Neutron character, who debuted in the company's 2001 film, Jimmy Neutron: Boy Genius. A television series, The Adventures of Jimmy Neutron, Boy Genius, subsequently aired on Nickelodeon from 2002 to 2006. DNA's final film project was The Ant Bully, also released in 2006.

== History ==
=== Early years ===
DNA Productions was founded in 1987, by John A. Davis and Keith Alcorn, after they left their positions at K & H Productions, a Dallas-based animation company. Davis and Alcorn started their new studio with a $5,000 loan. The company was based in the Dallas suburb of Irving. The name "DNA" stood for "Davis N Alcorn". The duo would regularly contact companies in search of animation work.

Up until 1997, DNA Productions had six employees and was involved in the production of commercials and corporate videos for companies such as Dairy Queen and Kroger. DNA also did other work for companies, such as logo design and end credit sequences. In their spare time during the early 1990s, Davis and Alcorn produced crude animated projects and would enter them in touring festivals, which helped their company rise to prominence. Among these projects was Nanna & Lil' Puss Puss, a series of adult shorts about an elderly woman and her cat. Other short projects included the pirate-themed Weird Beard, and The Adventures of Nippleless Nippleby, about a cherub who has no nipples.

By 1994, DNA had branched out to 3D animation after a corporate client, Mary Kay, requested a conference presentation that would feature dancing bottles of suntan lotion. The company then worked on A.J.'s Time Travelers, which aired briefly on Fox in 1994 before moving to syndication in 1995.

=== Breakthrough and final years ===
DNA's best-known creative work is the 3D animated character Jimmy Neutron, originally known as Johnny Quasar. In 1995, filmmaker Steve Oedekerk heard about a proof of concept video of the character, shown by DNA at an awards festival for animated projects. After seeing the footage himself, Oedekerk partnered with DNA on two television specials, The O Show and the animated Santa vs. the Snowman, both released in 1997. The latter was DNA's biggest project to date, requiring long hours to be finished in time for its Christmas airing. DNA had full creative control on the project, which was co-produced with Oedekerk's company O Entertainment. It was re-released as an IMAX film in 2002, under the title Santa vs. the Snowman 3D. As for The O Show, many of its effects were created by DNA. The company also provided animation work for the 1997 television series The Weird Al Show and Cartoon Sushi, and produced a direct-to-video series titled Jingaroo.

DNA lost some aspects of creative control as it partnered with other companies on these projects. According to Davis in 1999, "We were such a small company for so many years that we're used to doing everything ourselves. So it's been kind of hard to try to not do everything. But we've spent the last two or three years sort of weaning ourselves away." That year, the studio increased its staff from 17 to 30 workers to deal with the new projects, which included another animated holiday special titled Olive, the Other Reindeer. It was co-produced with The Curiosity Company and Fox Television Studios. DNA also produced Oedekerk's 1999 television pilot titled The Barnyard, which he later produced as the 2006 film Barnyard, without DNA's involvement.

During 1997, also with Oedekerk's help, DNA had begun negotiations with Nickelodeon to produce a Johnny Quasar television series. Plans for the TV project and an animated feature film were greenlit by Nickelodeon in 1999, with the character name changed to Jimmy Neutron. The film, after nearly two years of production, was released in December 2001, under the title Jimmy Neutron: Boy Genius. It was DNA's first feature film and its biggest project, and received generally positive reviews. The studio then started work on the television series, The Adventures of Jimmy Neutron, Boy Genius, which aired on Nickelodeon from July 20, 2002, to November 25, 2006. O Entertainment co-produced the film and television series.

After work on the series ended, DNA partnered with Playtone, Warner Bros. Pictures and Legendary Pictures to produce The Ant Bully, a 2006 animated film loosely based on the 1999 children's book of the same name. The film received mixed reviews, and was a box office failure, grossing 55.2 million dollars against a 50 million dollar budget. It was DNA's second feature film, and its final project. At the time of the film's release, DNA had 250 workers and no future projects aligned to generate further revenue. Davis noted in 2023 that he and Alcorn did not set out to build such a large company and felt the time was right to shut down and move on after The Ant Bully.

== Mascots ==
Helix the Cat was DNA's original mascot until 2002. He had two tails which were intertwined to form a double helix. While the Jimmy Neutron series was in production, Davis sought to replace Helix with a new studio mascot, a mutant three-eyed chimpanzee, who would appear in DNA's animated production logo at the end of each episode. The new mascot was named Paul, after DNA employee Paul Claerhout, who joined the company in 1990. Claerhout also provided the voice for Paul, who says "Hi! I’m Paul!" in most shots of the logo.
