= Male cow =

Male cow may refer to:

- Bull, intact adult male
- Ox, castrated adult male
- Steer, castrated male
- Male cattle inaccurately depicted in popular culture as possessing udders or producing milk, such as in the film Barnyard
