= League of Villains =

League of Villains may refer to:

- League of Villains (My Hero Academia), a fictional organization in the manga series My Hero Academia
- "The League of Villains", an episode of The Adventures of Jimmy Neutron, Boy Genius
