= Jimmy Neutron =

Animated titular character

- Jimmy Neutron character
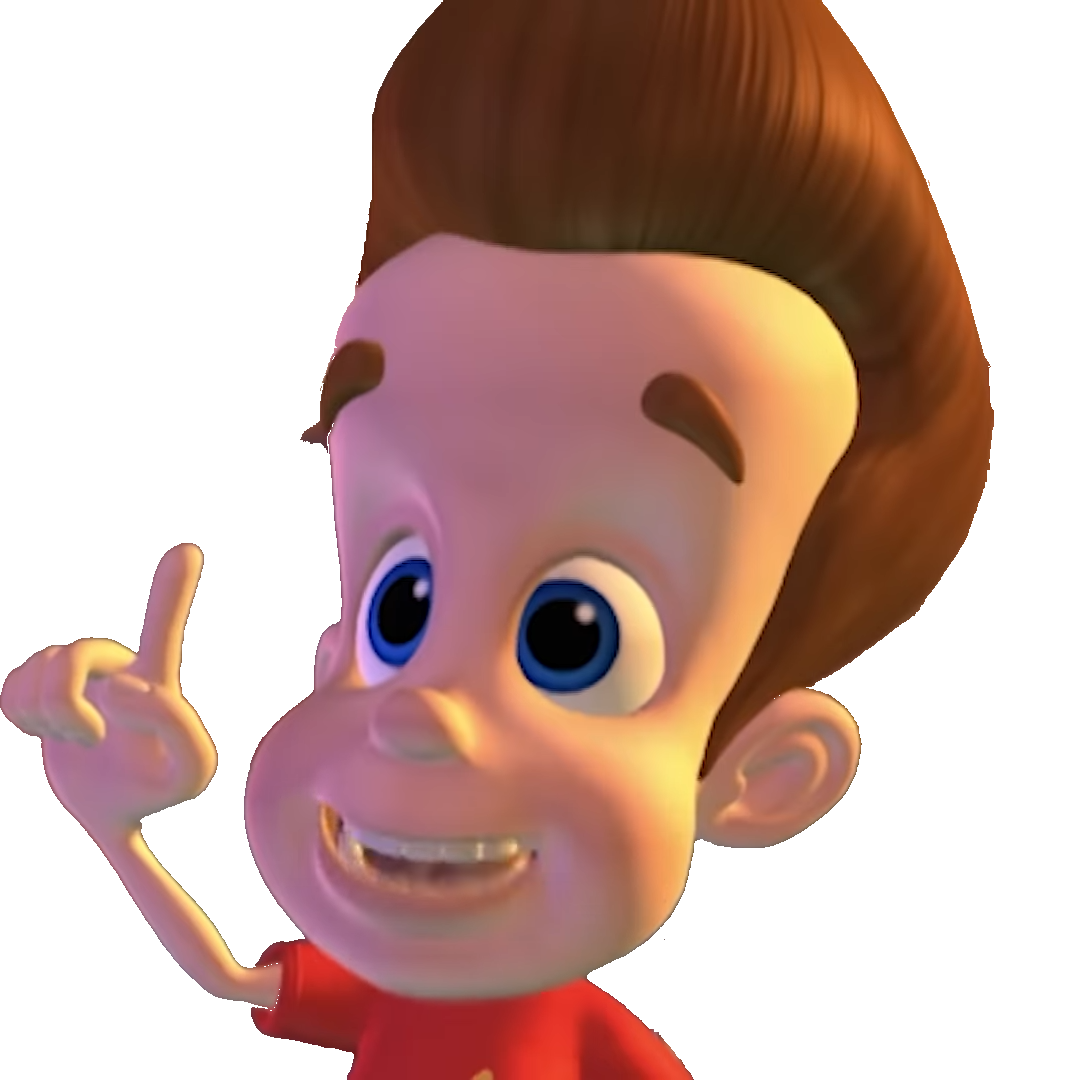
- First appearance: Runaway Rocketboy! (1998)
- Created by: John A. Davis
- Voiced by: Debi Derryberry (Main series); Lara Jill Miller (Nickelodeon Party Blast)

In-universe information
- Full name: James Isaac Neutron
- Nickname: Jimmy
- Species: Human
- Gender: Male
- Occupation: Inventor; Student
- Family: Hugh Neutron (father); Judy Neutron (mother)
- Significant other: Cindy Vortex
- Home: Retroville, Texas, United States
- Nationality: American

James Isaac "Jimmy" Neutron, commonly known as Jimmy Neutron, Boy Genius, is the protagonist and title character from the 2001 animated film Jimmy Neutron: Boy Genius and its Nickelodeon television series adaptation The Adventures of Jimmy Neutron, Boy Genius. Created by showrunner John A. Davis, he has been voiced by Debi Derryberry since the test pilot premiered in 1998.

The character originated in the 1980s, created by Davis and series co-creator Keith Alcorn under the name of Johnny Quasar, and was developed in a 13-minute long short film pitched to SIGGRAPH sometime in 1997, and with production beginning in that year. However, since the name sounded similar to Jonny Quest, Davis brain-stormed various other monikers before coming up with the current name. Characterized by his distinctive hairstyle and ridiculously high IQ of 210, Jimmy Neutron is a child prodigy with a passion for science and technology, being particularly proficient at mechanical engineering, electrical engineering, and aerospace engineering, all levels of physics, astronomy, computer programming, robotics, cybernetics, nanotechnology, and applied science. Throughout the series, he is seen with his companion, a robotic dog named Goddard (presumably after one of Jimmy's idols, Robert H. Goddard) and a rocket ship nicknamed the Strato XL which he uses in the opening sequence, both of which he invented. Furthermore, Neutron has a perennial rivalry with Cindy Vortex, who refers to him as "Nerd-tron".

== Role in The Adventures of Jimmy Neutron, Boy Genius ==
Jimmy Neutron is an intelligent 10-year-old boy who lives in Retroville with his parents, Judy and Hugh, and his robot dog, Goddard. Jimmy's friends are overweight Carl Wheezer and hyperactive Sheen Estevez, and he has a long-standing rivalry with his intelligent classmate, Cindy Vortex. Though Vortex teases him, she often acts as a voice of reason when his inventions become too immoral or dangerous.

== Character ==
=== Conception and creation ===
An early drawing of the character by Paul Claerhout with the original name

In the 1980s, Keith Alcorn and John A. Davis created the character, originally named Johnny Quasar (inspired by a facetious nickname that his Summer co-workers had coined for him in his youth), who builds a rocket ship and runs away from his parents. He later stumbled across the idea while moving into a new house in the early 1990s. He re-worked it as a short demo film titled The Adventures of Johnny Quasar and presented it at SIGGRAPH, where he met Steve Oedekerk and worked on a television series of the short as well as the movie. In fall 1995, the idea was pitched to Nickelodeon, who expressed immediate interest. Albie Hecht, the then-president of Nick, was particularly impressed- coining him to be "half Bart Simpson and half Albert Einstein," he strongly praised Johnny's blended personality as an adventurous and intelligent character and one grounded in the reality of childhood, which, according to him, made him "the perfect Nick kid." Following positive reception, Nickelodeon commissioned for a 13-minute pilot episode to be created. After several years of going through the review process, the episode began production in late 1997, and was completed in 1998. The name "Johnny Quasar" was changed at the request of Nickelodeon, who did not want the character to be confused with similarly named ones such as Jonny Quest and Captain Quazar, so Davis brainstormed other character names while walking his dog around the neighborhood block, eventually coming up with the final name, "Jimmy Neutron."

=== Personality and abilities ===
As explained in the theme song to the series, he is described as "a kid with a knack for invention". Despite this quote, his inventions tend to go haywire throughout the series, often because of both his pride and his lack of common sense. In difficult situations, he experiences extreme brainstorms that he terms as "brain blasts".

=== Portrayal ===
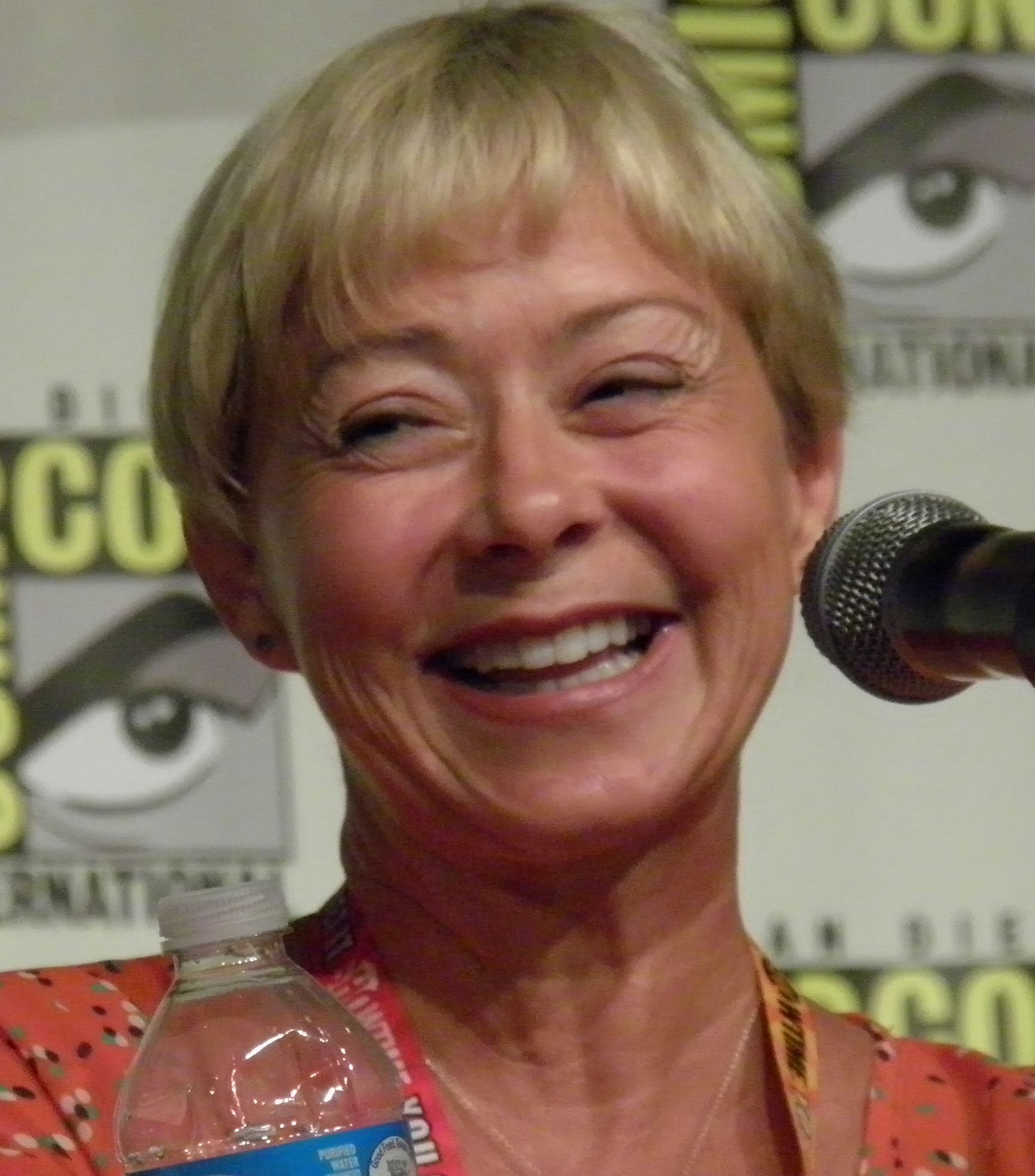
Debi Derryberry provides the voice of Jimmy Neutron

Jimmy Neutron is portrayed by voice actor Debi Derryberry, in TV series and film. Neutron was Derryberry's largest acting role at the time, as previously she had provided minor roles in films and TV shows. This is the second Nickelodeon character she voiced after Weenie from Oswald.
