= Santa vs. the Snowman 3D =

American TV special

- Theatrical release poster
- Written by: Steve Oedekerk; John A. Davis
- Directed by: John A. Davis
- Starring: Jonathan Winters; Ben Stein; Victoria Jackson; Mark DeCarlo; David Floyd
- Narrated by: Don LaFontaine
- Music by: Harvey R. Cohen
- Country of origin: United States

Production
- Executive producer: Steve Oedekerk
- Producers: Paul Marshal; John A. Davis; Keith Alcorn
- Editor: Kinsey Beck
- Running time: 22 minutes (TV); 32 minutes (theatrical)
- Production companies: O Entertainment; DNA Productions

Original release
- Network: ABC
- Release: December 13, 1997

Santa vs. the Snowman is a 1997 American animated Christmas comedy television special created by Steve Oedekerk and produced by O Entertainment. It originally aired on ABC on December 13, 1997, following The Online Adventures of Ozzie the Elf.

The special was voiced by Jonathan Winters, Ben Stein, Victoria Jackson, Mark DeCarlo and David Floyd, and narrated by Don LaFontaine.

Relations to other films, like a scene of ice-made AT-ST's, mostly resembling the ones from The Empire Strikes Back appear throughout.

In 2002, the special was released in IMAX 3D as Santa vs. the Snowman 3D, with new scenes at the beginning and end of the film.

== Plot ==
A lonely Snowman has no friends and never learned to speak because nobody was around. Instead, he plays his flute for the stars every night. On one particular night, the stars answer back, a flash of light zooms past the Snowman and shatters his flute. Consumed with curiosity, the Snowman sets off to find out what created the mysterious light. Eventually, the Snowman finds himself at Santa's Village. The Snowman enters a toy workshop, where elves are making toys. Another elf comes into the workshop with its owner, Santa Claus. While Santa is chatting with his elves, who praise him highly, the Snowman finds a red and gold flute in the workshop. After grabbing the flute, an alarm goes off. The Snowman retreats, but Santa sends some of his elves to retrieve the flute. While being chased, the Snowman drops the flute, and hides from the elves by jumping off a cliff. He grabs an icicle stalactite, waiting for them to leave. After the elves retrieve the flute and return to the village, the Snowman heads home.

The Snowman cannot stop thinking about Santa and his wonderful workshop. It seems that Santa has a marvelous home, many friends, plenty of toys, and is loved by everybody, but he wouldn't let the Snowman have the flute. The Snowman imagines himself as Santa, giving out toys, loved by everyone. At that moment, the Snowman thinks, "Why should Santa keep all that love, good tidings, and friendship for himself? That didn't seem fair. Maybe, it's time someone else got to be Santa?" With that, the Snowman forms a plan to take Santa's spot. The Snowman sneaks onto a guided village train tour, where he takes pictures with a camera disguised as an ice cream cone. The Snowman gets off the train and admires Santa's sleigh, where he is noticed and kicked out. The Snowman then makes various equipment for invading the workshop, and snowman minions to help him, becoming a much more devious Snowman.

The Snowman and his minions invade Santa's Village, but Santa sends his elves to fight back, in a chaotic battle. The elves attempt to melt and blow up the snowmen while the snowmen spew snowballs at the elves. Since Christmas is only hours away, Santa decides to help his elves end the conflict, and enters the battle in a large Nutcracker mech. The Snowman unleashes a snow monster, but Santa's mech defeats the monster by shrinking it with a heat gun. Just when it seems that Snowman is about to surrender, many more of his minions appear, greatly outnumbering Santa's forces. With that, Santa and his elves are imprisoned in an ice cage, and the Snowman leaves to deliver toys.

The Snowman, feeling wonderful because everyone will soon love him, soars above the rooftops in a snow replica of Santa's sleigh, while his minions act as his reindeer. The Snowman arrives at a little girl's house and enters through the front door. An elf named Flippy frees Santa and his elves, and Santa heads to the Snowman's location. The Snowman gives the girl an ice doll, but the doll shatters, and his other toys melted near the fireplace. This causes the girl to burst into tears. But then, Santa arrives and gives the girl a real doll. Instead of punishing the Snowman, Santa, knowing the Snowman regrets what he did, gives him the flute he attempted to steal. Santa explains to the Snowman that the flute always belonged to him because Santa accidentally broke the other flute, and that he could've given joy to people on his own, without taking over Santa's operations. As they are about to part ways, the Snowman discovers that his sleigh and his minions had melted from the heat of the little girl's chimney. Santa offers the Snowman a ride back home, and they become friends.

== Cast ==
- Jonathan Winters as Santa Claus
- Don LaFontaine as the Narrator
- Ben Stein as Spunky the Elf
- Victoria Jackson as Communication Elf
- Mark DeCarlo as Flippy the Elf and Security Elf
- David Floyd as Security Elf
- Jean DeLisle as Kids
- John A. Davis as Elves
- Keith Alcorn as Charlie the Elf
- Steve Oedekerk as Sno' Hellton
- Dee Bradley Baker as Elves
- Jim Jackman as Elves
- Gabriel Nelson as Elves

== Release ==
Originally made as a television special for the ABC Television Network in December 1997, the film was later presented in IMAX 3D theaters during the November 2002–06 holiday seasons. The year of the IMAX release was dominated by the development and production of several "vs." crossovers: Freddy vs. Jason (2003), Rugrats Go Wild (a crossover with The Wild Thornberrys, 2003), Alien vs. Predator (2004), and a cancelled Batman vs. Superman project. Three bonus features included an interactive game narrated by Oedekerk, but no featurette or commentary.

Santa vs. the Snowman 3D was released on 3D-DVD, including 4 pairs of 3D glasses, on October 12, 2004, by Universal Studios Home Video. It offered optional 2D or 3D viewing. The film grossed $10.1M according to Rotten Tomatoes.

== Reception ==
The film received a rating of 81% from Rotten Tomatoes.

=== Awards ===
In 2003, Santa vs. the Snowman was awarded a Golden Reel Award for Best Sound Editing in Special Venue Film.

Sound editors:

- Tim Archer (supervising sound editor / re-recording mixer)
- Brian Eimer (supervising sound editor / re-recording mixer)
- Carl Lenox (music editor)
- Dan Shattuck (sound editor)
- Grant McAlpine (sound editor)
- Regan Ramos (sound editor)

== See also ==
- List of Christmas films
- Santa Claus in film
