= Nothing to Lose (1997 film) =

- Theatrical release poster
- Directed by: Steve Oedekerk
- Written by: Steve Oedekerk
- Produced by: Martin Bregman; Dan Jinks; Michael Bregman
- Starring: Martin Lawrence; Tim Robbins; John C. McGinley; Giancarlo Esposito; Kelly Preston
- Cinematography: Donald E. Thorin
- Edited by: Malcolm Campbell
- Music by: Robert Folk
- Production companies: Touchstone Pictures; O Entertainment
- Distributed by: Buena Vista Pictures Distribution
- Release date: July 18, 1997 (United States)
- Running time: 98 minutes
- Country: United States
- Language: English
- Budget: $25 million
- Box office: $44.5 million

Nothing to Lose is a 1997 American buddy action comedy film starring Tim Robbins and Martin Lawrence. The film was written and directed by Steve Oedekerk, who also makes a cameo appearance in a minor role.

The film was released in July 1997 to negative reviews from critics, but went on to gross over US$40 million at the box office. The theme song was "If I Had No Loot" by Tony! Toni! Toné!, but it was a remixed version of the song "Not Tonight"—performed by Lil' Kim and featuring Da Brat, Left Eye, Angie Martinez, and Missy Elliott—that garnered the most attention from the soundtrack as it gained much airplay on television and radio and reached the top ten on the Billboard Hot 100 chart.

The film was shot at various locations in California and New Jersey. The main California locations were Los Angeles—including the U.S. Bank Tower for Nick's office—and Monrovia. The main location in New Jersey was Bloomfield.

== Plot ==
Advertising executive Nick Beam thinks his life is going very well, until he returns home from work and finds his wife Ann apparently having an affair with another man. He deduces that the man is his boss, Philip Barrow, after finding a pair of Philip's cufflinks in the kitchen. On the edge of a nervous breakdown, Nick drives around the city until carjacker Terrence Paul "T-Paul" Davidson jumps into his car and attempts to rob him. Nick turns the tables on his mugger, kidnapping T-Paul, and drives him to a diner in an Arizona desert. After T-Paul robs a gas station, Nick and T-Paul decide to team up to rob Philip in revenge for the affair. Nick knows the combination to a safe in Philip's office containing a large amount of cash, while T-Paul knows the weaknesses of the security system.

Another criminal duo, Davis "Rig" Lanlow and Charles "Charlie" Dunt, get blamed for the gas station robbery. When they find Nick and T-Paul, the duo ram Nick's truck off the road and hold the pair at gunpoint. After a brief confrontation, T-Paul disarms them but accidentally shoots Nick in the arm. They escape as Rig and Charlie follow them back to Los Angeles. T-Paul takes Nick to his apartment so they can rest; there, Nick sees T-Paul's electrical engineering certification and rejection letters from prospective employers. The next night, the pair execute their plan. During the robbery, Nick damages Philip's prize fertility statue and reveals himself to the security camera, taunting his boss about getting revenge. The pair then hide from a security guard, who lip-synches to music for over an hour. Later they leave the office unseen and settle at a hotel for the night. Rig and Charlie, who stole Nick's business card and followed them from the office to the hotel, show up at their room, take T-Paul hostage, and steal the money. Meanwhile, Nick has gone to the bar to have a drink, where he meets Danielle, a woman he met earlier. Danielle takes him to her room to have sex, but Nick changes his mind and leaves.

Nick calls Ann to confront her about the affair, but she explains that he was wrong. Nick actually saw Ann's sister and her fiance in bed when they came into town earlier than expected; having never seen her sister before, Nick mistook her for Ann. He also learns that Philip's cuff links were left behind at a Christmas party, and Ann left them out for Nick to return them to Philip. Overcome with remorse over his actions, Nick returns to the room and saves T-Paul from a trap that Rig and Charlie placed him in. They catch up to Rig and Charlie and chase them into an alley. Nick shoots the gun out of Rig's hand, and the pair get back the money as they leave Rig and Charlie tied up for the police to find. As they are driving away, Nick insists on returning the money, but T-Paul, who had planned on using the money to move his family out of their troubled neighborhood, refuses to take it back and they fight. Nick assures T-Paul that nobody will look at the security tapes unless something is missing or damaged and that he can still make things right. T-Paul decides to give the money to Nick and walks home to his family, while Nick drives home and reunites with Ann.

Returning to his job, Nick is told that Philip is reviewing the security tapes to investigate a burglar who vandalized his statue. Nick races to his boss's office but is too late to stop them, only to discover that the tape was recorded over right before the "burglar" removed his mask and that a man identifying himself as an electrician was allowed into the building earlier in the day. Knowing that T-Paul is the one who recorded over the tape, Nick goes to see him to show his gratitude. Nick offers T-Paul a job as an electrician and a security expert, which he accepts.

In the post-credit scene, a mail carrier shows up at the gas station in Arizona and returns the money that T-Paul stole.

== Cast ==
- Tim Robbins as Nick Beam
- Martin Lawrence as Terrence Paul "T-Paul" Davidson
- John C. McGinley as Davis "Rig" Lanlow
- Giancarlo Esposito as Charles "Charlie" Dunt
- Michael McKean as Philip "P.B." Barrow
- Kelly Preston as Ann Beam
- Susan Barnes as Delores
- Rebecca Gayheart as Danielle
- Samaria Graham as Lisa Davidson
- Marcus Paulk as Joey Davidson
- Penny Bae Bridges as Tonya Davidson
- Irma P. Hall as Bertha "Mama" Davidson
- Patrick Cranshaw as Henry
- Steve Oedekerk as Security Guard Baxter
- Blake Clark as Gas Station Cashier (uncredited)
- Caroline Keenan as Ann's sister
- Randy Oglesby as Sheriff Earl
- Dan Martin as LAPD Sergeant

== Production ==
In 1993, Bregman/Baer Productions bought the rights to the script, beating out 20th Century Fox and Paramount Pictures. They had originally planned to develop it as a vehicle for John Leguizamo.

== Reception ==
=== Critical reception ===
Nothing to Lose was met with negative reviews from professional critics. On Review aggregator Rotten Tomatoes 32% of the critics have given the film a positive review based on 25 reviews with an average rating of 5.3/10. Roger Ebert of the Chicago Sun-Times gave it 2 out of 4 stars. Ebert criticized the plot "in which everything depends on a crucial but unconvincing misunderstanding that needs to be laboriously contrived". Phil Villarreal of the Arizona Daily Star gave the film a positive review and stated, "Tim Robbins' understated depression and Martin Lawrence's hyperactive ranting are the perfectly hilarious foil for one another."

Audiences polled by CinemaScore gave the film an average grade of "A−" on an A+ to F scale.

=== Box office ===
The film made its debut at #4 at the North American box office, and made $11,617,767 on its opening weekend in 1,862 theaters. Its widest release was 1,888 theaters. During its run, the film made a domestic total of $44,480,039. Its production budget was $25 million.

=== Accolades ===
- Bogey Awards
  - won in 1998

== Soundtrack ==
A soundtrack containing hip hop and R&B music was released on July 1, 1997 by Tommy Boy Records. It peaked at #12 on the Billboard 200 and #5 on the Top R&B/Hip-Hop Albums and was certified gold on September 3, 1997.
