= The O Show =

1997 American comedy variety TV special

- Also known as: steve.oedekerk.com
- Genre: Variety show; Surreal comedy; Sketch comedy
- Written by: Steve Oedekerk; Robert Kuhn
- Directed by: Steve Oedekerk
- Starring: Steve Oedekerk; Fred Willard; Stephen Root; Kristian Alfonso; Robin Riker; Tom Wilson; Jim Jackman; John Mendoza; Jason Duplissea; Robert Hutchinson; Heather Morgan; Ned Gill
- Composer: Vern Nelson
- Country of origin: United States
- Original language: English

Production
- Executive producers: Steve Oedekerk; Sandy Chanley
- Producers: Tom Bull; Keith Truesdell
- Editor: Paul Marshall
- Running time: 47 Minutes
- Production company: O Entertainment

Original release
- Network: NBC
- Release: September 3, 1997

The O Show, also known as steve.oedekerk.com, is a 1997 surreal comedy variety TV special put together for NBC by O Entertainment founder Steve Oedekerk. This was the first prime time network special to feature and extensive use of graphical sets and computer animation.

The show features segments such as 'Glass Booth Guy', in which passersby are harassed by a man in an unbreakable glass booth at a gas station; 'Plane Stalker', in which a man finds himself being followed by a full-size airliner (in similar fashion as Monty Python's "The Killer Cars"), 'Fat Back Jack', in which a morbidly obese man sings of his need for a woman to 'help him find his shoes', and 'Oedebattle', a Mortal Kombat style video game where an arrogant warrior mercilessly defeats hopelessly outmatched opponents. The O Show also featured appearances by Tom Wilson.

The show made heavy use of computer animation combined with live action footage, a relatively novel concept in the world of television at that time.

This film is known to be Robert Hutchinson's (the actor who played Billy) only film so far.

== Cast ==
This is the following cast:

- Steve Oedekerk as Himself
- Fred Willard as Contestant
- Stephen Root
- Kristan Alfonso as Lisa
- Robin Riker as Mom
- Tom Wilson
- Jim Jackman as The Cop
- John Mendoza
- Jason Duplissea
- Robert Hutchinson as Billy
- Heather Morgan as Female Customer
- Ned Gill as Cliff Vet

== Plot ==
In the beginning of the movie we see Billy (Robert Hutchinson) in his room playing on his computer as his mom (Robin Riker) walks in to bring some CDs from his dad's warehouse. He reads one the CDs that says "Oedekerk" and puts it in his CD-ROM drive. The computer begins to go completely out of control as Billy and his room is sucked into the World Wide Web. Steve Oedekerk as himself introduces himself as well as introduces and tells us about the World Wide Web and where to go for help.

The show begins to feature many of its segments known as 'Glass Booth Guy', in which passersby are harassed by a man in an unbreakable glass booth at a gas station; 'Plane Stalker', in which a man finds himself being followed by a full-size airliner, 'Fat Back Jack', in which a morbidly obese man sings of his need for a woman to 'help him find his shoes', and 'Oedebattle', a Mortal Kombat style video game where an arrogant warrior mercilessly defeats hopelessly outmatched opponents as well as the "Talking Skeleton", "Hotsy", a wasabi tsukumogami and much more.

In the end, we see Billy back in his room with most of the characters from the segments going crazy and dancing. His mother comes into his room in sudden shock and tells him to go to bed. A face sticks out of the door and the commotion goes on again.

During the end credits we see outtakes and reels by different comedians and the talking skeleton from the segments of the show screaming "Who am I?" twice while Steve Oedekerk is playing his guitar.

== Home media ==
O Entertainment released an extremely rare VHS copy in 1997. However, it has not been seen for sell, it is only for available by the owners at O Entertainment.

The YouTube Channel "Oedekerk Report" released a VHS Capture of the show in 2013, and has been praised for its accurate predictions for what the Internet would become in the following decades.

== Sequel ==
A second volume called "The O Show: Vol II" was released possibly that year. Nothing is known about its release, plot, or home media yet because of its rarity to the public. According to Oedeville.com, there is a second volume in existence, but not released to the public.
