= The Adventures of Jimmy Neutron, Boy Genius =

American animated television series

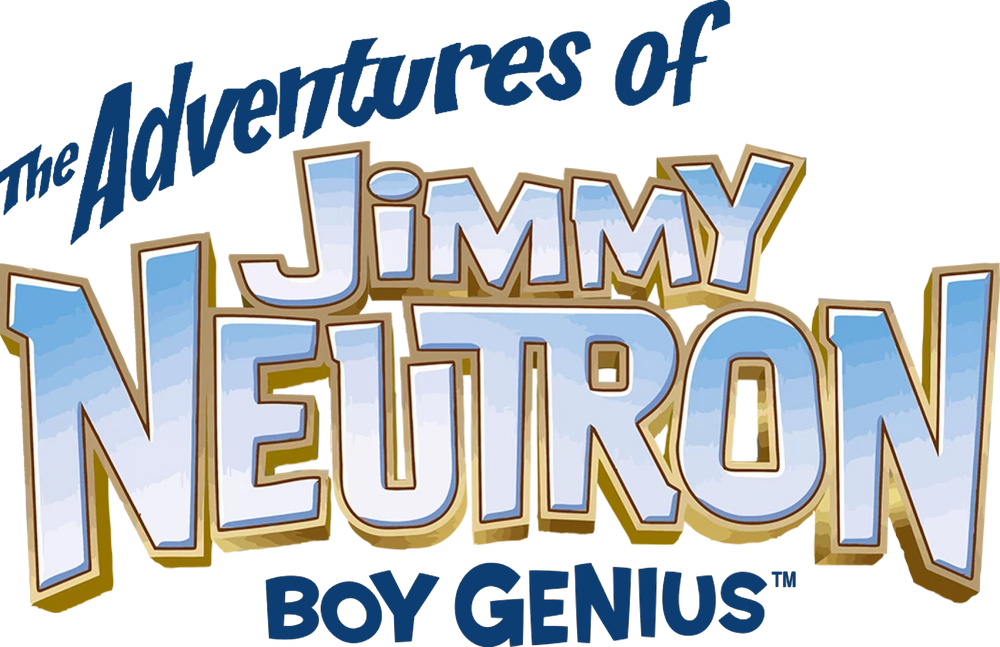
- Genre: Action; Adventure; Science fiction comedy
- Created by: John A. Davis
- Based on: Jimmy Neutron: Boy Genius by: John A. Davis; Steve Oedekerk
- Showrunner: Steve Oedekerk
- Directed by: Keith Alcorn; Mike Gasaway; Kirby Atkins
- Voices of: Debi Derryberry; Rob Paulsen; Jeff Garcia; Carolyn Lawrence; Crystal Scales; Candi Milo; Frank Welker; Andrea Martin; Phil LaMarr; Tim Curry; Jeff Bennett
- Theme music composer: Brian Causey
- Composer: Charlie Brissette
- Country of origin: United States
- Original language: English
- No. of seasons: 3
- No. of episodes: 64 (90 segments) (list of episodes)

Production
- Executive producers: O Entertainment: Steve Oedekerk; DNA Productions: John A. Davis; Keith Alcorn
- Producers: Keith Alcorn; John A. Davis; Paul Marshal
- Editors: Jon Price; John Wahba; Joe E. Elwood
- Running time: 11 minutes (segments); 22–44 minutes (full episodes/specials); 73 minutes ("Win, Lose and Kaboom!")
- Production companies: O Entertainment; DNA Productions

Original release
- Network: Nickelodeon
- Release: July 20, 2002 – November 25, 2006

Related
- Jimmy Neutron: Boy Genius; Planet Sheen

The Adventures of Jimmy Neutron, Boy Genius (or just The Adventures of Jimmy Neutron and often shortened as Jimmy Neutron) is an American animated science fiction and adventure television series created by John A. Davis for Nickelodeon. The series was produced by DNA Productions in association with O Entertainment. It was the first Nickelodeon cartoon to be animated in computer-generated imagery (CGI), as well as the first television series from the channel to be based on a film. Set in the fictional town of Retroville in Texas, and serving as a sequel and spin-off to the film Jimmy Neutron: Boy Genius (2001), the series revolves around the adventures of Jimmy Neutron, a boy genius who is frequently accompanied by his best friends, Carl Wheezer and Sheen Estevez, with Jimmy's various inventions often going awry.

The series originally aired from July 20, 2002 to November 25, 2006 on Nickelodeon for three seasons comprising 64 episodes total, including three crossover specials with fellow Nickelodeon series, The Fairly OddParents. The series won two BMI Film & TV Awards, two Annie Awards and one Golden Reel Award. A spin-off, Planet Sheen, aired from 2010 to 2013.

== Premise ==
The show follows a scientifically-minded boy named Jimmy Neutron from Retroville, Texas who frequently goes on adventures with his two best friends, Carl and Sheen, usually involving his inventions going wrong.

== Episodes ==
Season	Episodes	Originally released	
Season	Episodes	First released	Last released
Pilot		September 7, 1998	
Film		December 21, 2001	
1	19	July 20, 2002	September 5, 2003
2	17	September 19, 2003	July 9, 2004
3	19	November 11, 2004	November 25, 2006
Specials	3	May 7, 2004	July 21, 2006

=== The Fairly OddParents crossover episodes ===
There have also been three tie-ins with special episode crossovers involving the Nickelodeon hand-drawn style series The Fairly OddParents under the title "The Jimmy Timmy Power Hour" (the first alone, the second and third with the subtitles "When Nerds Collide!" and "The Jerkinators!," respectively); the five main characters from Jimmy Neutron meet with the main characters from The Fairly OddParents, Timmy, his godparents, and his two best friends Chester, and AJ, and often cross between each of their worlds of 2D and 3D animation.

== Production ==
=== Development ===
Keith Alcorn and John A. Davis created Jimmy (then named Johnny Quasar) sometime during the 1980s and wrote a script titled Runaway Rocketboy (later the name of the pilot), which was abandoned. He later stumbled upon the idea while moving into a new house in the early 1990s. Davis re-worked it as a short film titled Johnny Quasar and presented it at SIGGRAPH, where he met Steve Oedekerk and worked on a television series of the short as well as the movie. Jimmy was still called Johnny Quasar before it was decided to name him Jimmy Neutron because the name sounded too similar to Jonny Quest. The pilot involves Jimmy Neutron testing a rocket ship that he has invented, and later uses it when he inadvertently stumbles upon a Yolkian plot to conquer Earth. The pilot was aired in short mini-episodes on Nickelodeon before the film's release, and its plot was used for the film. It was later included as an extra on the "Confusion Fusion" and "The Complete Series" DVDs. It was originally supposed to air as a short on KaBlam!, but the show got canceled before the episode aired.

The pilot had a few differences from the main series. In it, Jimmy wore a red and white striped shirt and did not wear his signature red atom shirt, Judy's hair was darker, Hugh wore a blue suit (instead of a sweater vest and tie) and was a bit smarter, the Yolkians all wore grey suits and King Goobot's crown was a different color, the theme song was longer with a few lines that were cut later, Goddard was voiced by Kim Saxon, Carl Wheezer had a very different design, main characters Sheen Estevez, Cindy Vortex, and Libby Folfax were absent and the title card had a picture in the scene.

=== Writing ===
The show began with Jed Spingarn as story editor and Steven Banks as head writer, though the series featured a variety of freelance writers as well. Midway through the first season, Jed Spingarn was promoted to Co-Producer and started writing fewer episodes, while Gene Grillo took his place as story editor. In seasons 2 and 3 the show featured fewer freelance writers and Banks and Grillo wrote most episodes. In addition, season 1 was more episodic and had mostly 11-minute episodes, while seasons 2 and 3 had serial elements and mostly half-hour episodes.

=== Animation ===
DNA Productions retooled their pipeline when moving from the film to the TV series, to reuse assets for the episodes. Some of the programming team at the studio programmed a special code that allowed the animators to animate scenes in Alias Maya, which can then be rendered in LightWave 3D. This helped the team keep up with the deadline and avoid going over budget.

=== Possible reboot ===
In 2016, Davis stated that he has a story for a Jimmy Neutron reboot feature that he would like to make, but he is waiting for the "right situation" to make it.

When asked about a reboot in 2020, Rob Paulsen stated, "Well, I've got to tell you, man. I go all over the world when we don't have the coronavirus, and people love Carl. They love Carl. I don't think it would be a bad thing at all to reboot Jimmy Neutron. I think that's one of those shows that a lot of people would love to see again. It was very good. Really smart. That wouldn't surprise me."

In 2025, screenwriter Adam Pava unveiled that a potential new film project based on the character was in the works since December 2023. Later that year, Sheen voice actor Jeff Garcia died, aged 50.

== Theme song ==
The theme song was originally written and recorded by Brian Causey of Man or Astro-man? for the pilot episode. Pop-punk band Bowling for Soup later revamped and extended Causey's theme for the film version theme. Ultimately, the original theme was kept for the TV series intro and outro.

== Reception ==
=== Critical reception ===
Joly Herman of Common Sense Media gave the series 3 out of 5 stars; saying that, "Jimmy Neutron has all the trappings of a Nickelodeon show: the preteen peer pressure, the gadgets, the spacey parents. But it's clever enough and funny enough to have earned a devoted following. The script is generally well written and well executed – the adults behind this show approach the project with apparent zeal. [...] Kids will enjoy this program, while parents might get a kick out of some of the gags as well. And though the computer animation may seem a bit freaky for old-school animation fans, it does allow for quality special effects."

=== Awards and nominations ===
Year	Award	Category	Nominee	Result	Ref
2003	BMI Awards	BMI Cable Award	Charlie Brissette	Won	
2004	31st Annie Awards	Outstanding Achievement in an Animated Television Production Produced for Children	Nickelodeon and DNA Productions	Won	
2004	31st Annie Awards	Outstanding Achievement Directing in an Animated Television Production	Mike Gasaway	Nominated	
2004	31st Annie Awards	Outstanding Achievement in Voice Acting in an Animated Television Production	Jeffrey Garcia as Sheen	Won	
2004	10th annual NAMIC Vision Awards	Children's	MTV/Nickelodeon for The Adventures of Jimmy Neutron, Boy Genius	Nominated	
2004	BMI Awards	BMI Cable Award	Charlie Brissette and Brian Causey	Won	
2004	Golden Reel Awards	Best Sound Editing in Television Animation	The Adventures of Jimmy Neutron, Boy Genius	Won	
2005	32nd Annie Awards	Outstanding Achievement in Directing in an Animated Television Production	Keith Alcorn	Nominated	
2005	32nd Annie Awards	Outstanding Achievement in Voice Acting in an Animated Television Production	Carolyn Lawrence as Cindy	Nominated	
2006	33rd Annie Awards	Outstanding Achievement in Writing in an Animated Television Production	Christopher Painter	Nominated	
2006	2006 Kids' Choice Awards	Favorite Cartoon	The Adventures of Jimmy Neutron, Boy Genius	Nominated	
2007	2007 Kids' Choice Awards	Favorite Cartoon	The Adventures of Jimmy Neutron, Boy Genius	Nominated	

== Home media ==
=== DVD releases ===
The Adventures of Jimmy Neutron, Boy Genius home media releases
Season	Title	Region	Release date
1	Confusion Fusion	1	May 27, 2003
1	Sea of Trouble	1	October 7, 2003
1	Jimmy Timmy Power Hour	1	May 11, 2004
1	Nick Picks #2	1	October 18, 2005
1	Nick Picks #3	1	February 7, 2006
1	Nick Picks #4	1	June 6, 2006
1	Jimmy Timmy Power Hour 3	1	July 25, 2006
1	Party at Neutron's	2	September 4, 2006
1	King of Mars	4	July 5, 2007
1	Best of Season One	1	September 16, 2008
1	The Complete Series	1	October 26, 2021
2	Jet Fusion	1	February 3, 2004
2	Jet Fusion	2	July 7, 2005
2	Jimmy Timmy Power Hour 2	1	March 14, 2006
2	Jimmy Timmy Power Hour 3	1	July 25, 2006
2	Best of Season Two	1	September 16, 2008
2	The Complete Series	1	October 26, 2021
3	Attack of the Twonkies	1	November 16, 2004
3	Nick Picks #5	1	March 13, 2007
3	King of Mars	4	July 5, 2007
3	Best of Season Three	1	September 16, 2008
3	The Complete Series	1	October 26, 2021

== Spin-off ==
A spin-off series, Planet Sheen, aired from 2010 to 2013. The show focuses on Sheen Estevez, who accidentally crash-lands on the planet Zeenu in the pilot episode.
