= Debi Derryberry =

American voice actress (born 1960)

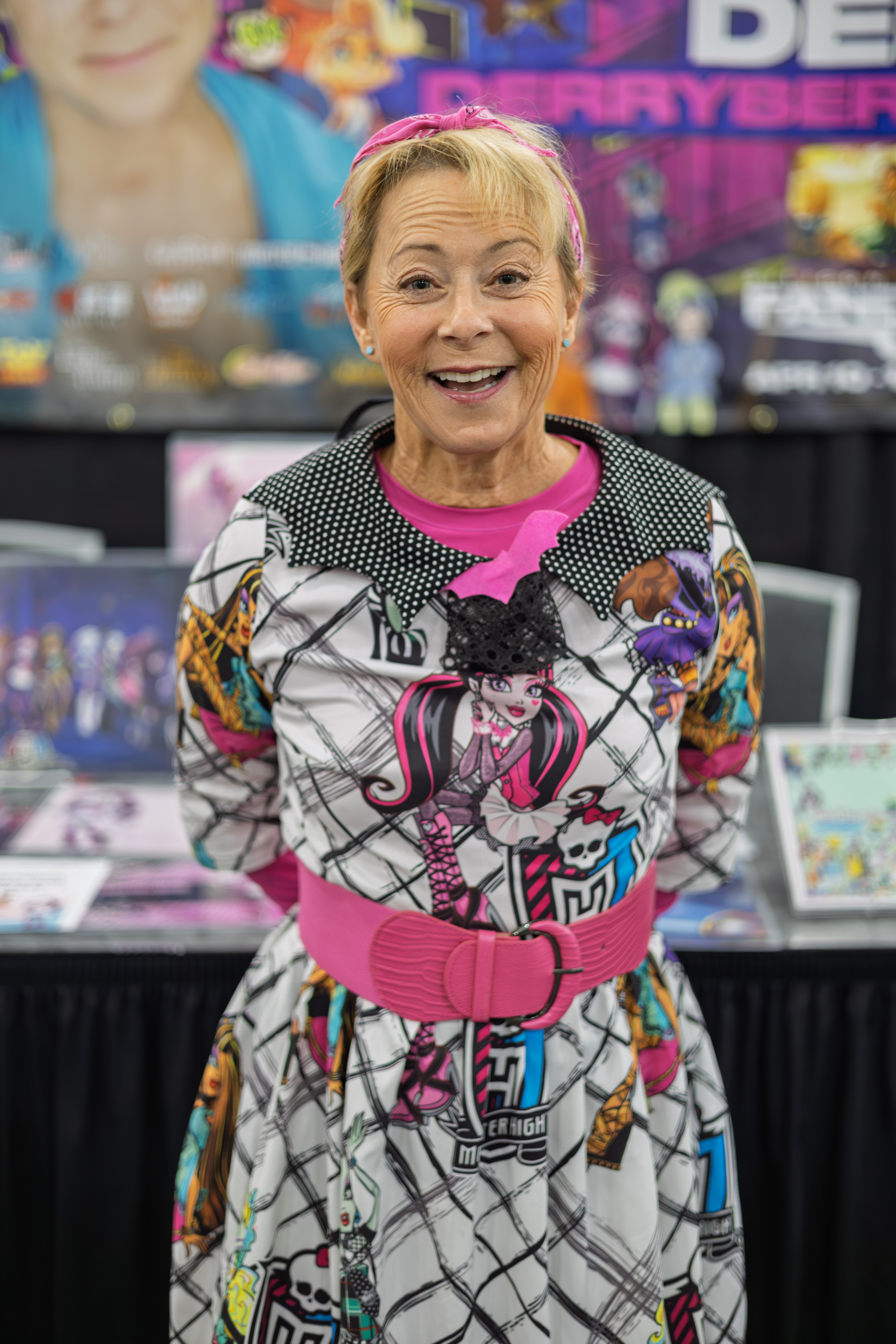
- Derryberry at Fandomcon San Jose in 2026
- Born: Debbie Greenberg; September 27, 1960 (age 66); Indio, California, U.S.
- Education: University of California, Los Angeles
- Occupations: Voice actress; musician
- Years active: 1977–present
- Spouse: Ian Hall
- Children: 1
- Website: debiderryberry.com

Debi Derryberry (née Greenberg; born September 27, 1960) is an American voice actress who has provided voices for a number of animations and video games. From 2001 to 2006, she voiced the titular protagonist of the Jimmy Neutron franchise.

== Biography ==
Derryberry was born on September 27, 1960, in Indio, California to a family of Hungarian-Jewish descent. Her grandparents were Holocaust survivors. After graduating from Indio High School in 1978, she attended the University of California, Los Angeles and majored in kinesiology there. In 1977, Derryberry was in an Off-Broadway production of To Kill a Mockingbird at Circle Theatre, where she played Scout. After college, she moved to Nashville to become a country singer.

Her first film role was as Skeeter in Hey Vern, It's Ernest! along with Jim Varney, which was filmed in 1987. She was also a body double for Scott Menville in Ernest Goes to Camp (1987). Menville's mother, Dorothy Menville, convinced Derryberry to try her hand at voice-overs. She sent her demo to several agents and casting directors, among them Ginny McSwain who advised Derryberry to move back from Nashville to California and then cast her as Jackie on Bobby's World.

Her voice roles include the title character from the first CGI film Jimmy Neutron: Boy Genius and its CGI TV series The Adventures of Jimmy Neutron, Boy Genius, Wednesday in Hanna-Barbera's The Addams Family, Tinker Bell on Fox's Peter Pan & the Pirates, Nergal Jr. in The Grim Adventures of Billy & Mandy, Jay Jay, Herky, Savannah, and Revvin' Evan from Jay Jay the Jet Plane (following the death of Mary Kay Bergman), Tad on various LeapFrog animated videos and DVD's from 2003 to 2004, Coco Bandicoot in the Crash Bandicoot series, Draculaura in Monster High, and Maureen Murphy in F is for Family.

Derryberry was the voice of Clay in the Playhouse Disney segments presented in the early 2000s. In English language dubs of anime series, she provided the voice of Ryo-Ohki in Tenchi Muyo!. She received a Best Actress in a Comedy award at the American Anime Awards for her work as Zatch in Zatch Bell! and for Chica's Magic Rainbow in FNAF World Update 2.

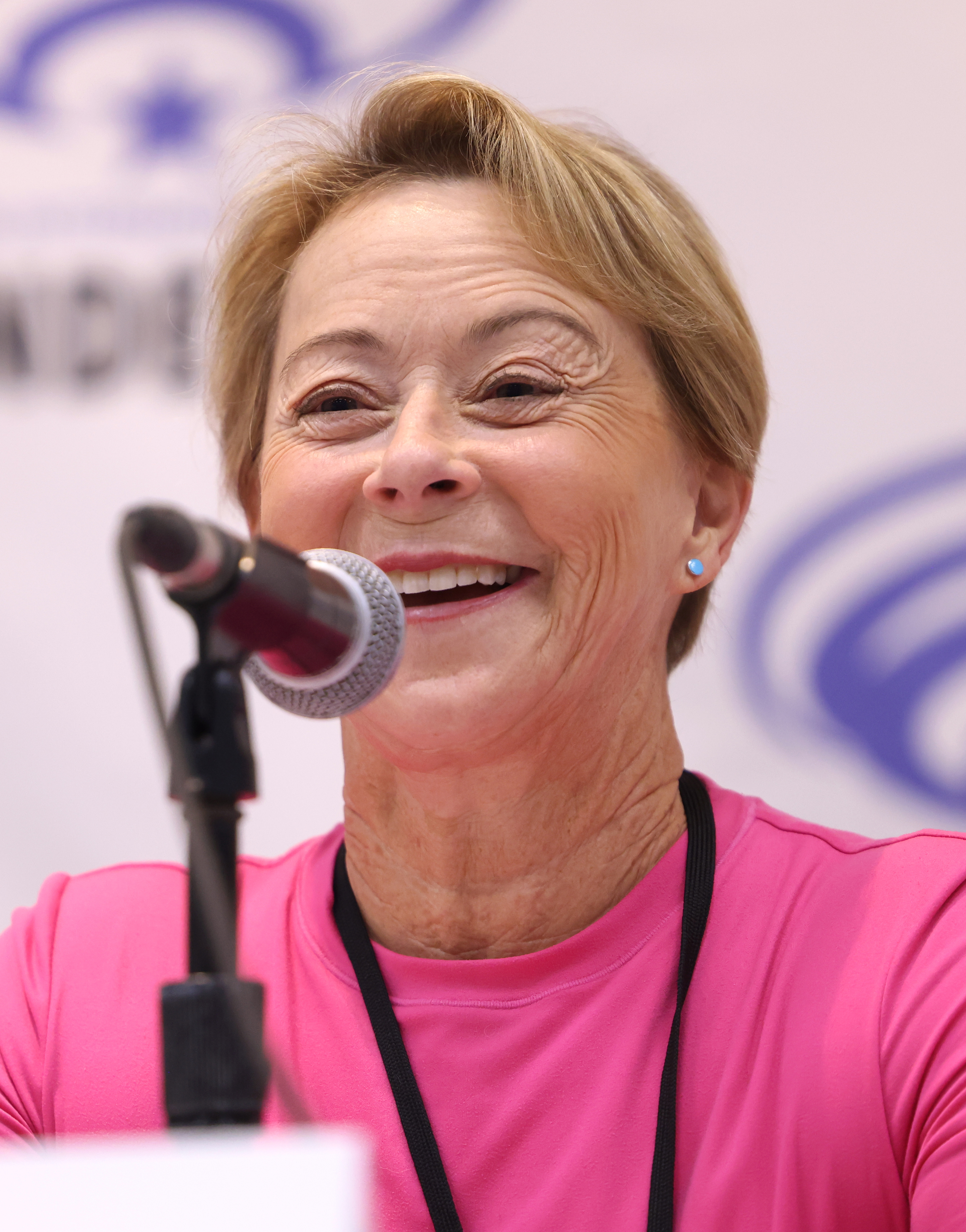
Derryberry at the 2026 WonderCon

Aside from her work as a voice actress, Derryberry worked on the 1993 film Free Willy as the stunt double for Jesse's actor Jason James Richter in some shots that showed Keiko who played Willy. She has provided the voices of a series of characters, mostly those of young boys and tomboyish girls. In addition, Derryberry has also provided voice-over for Ice Age: The Meltdown, as the voice of Wednesday Addams in the 1990s animated version of The Addams Family, Weenie and Catrina on Oswald, Taz's little brother Jake on Taz-Mania, Coco Bandicoot in the Crash Bandicoot video game series, and Clay in some Playhouse Disney segments.

She has also done voice work for comedic English-language adaptations of anime titles such as Zatch Bell! in which she plays the titular character as well as his evil twin Zeno, and Ryo-Ohki, Yugi, and various other characters from several versions of the anime series Tenchi Muyo!.

== Personal life ==
Derryberry lives with her husband Ian Hall and her son in Toluca Lake, California. She was previously married to Doug Derryberry.

== Filmography ==
=== Animation ===
List of voice performances in animation
Year	Title	Role	Notes	Source
1990–98	Bobby's World	Jackie		Resume
1991–95	Taz-Mania	Jake		
1992–93	The Addams Family	Wednesday Addams		
1994	Aaahh!!! Real Monsters	Various characters		
1994	Duckman	Sherry	Episode: "Gripes of Wrath"	
1995	Life with Louie	Jeannie Harper		
1995	What-a-Mess	Daughter		
1996–99	Jumanji	Judy Shepherd		Resume
1997	Johnny Bravo	Various characters		
1997	Cow and Chicken	Various characters		
1997	Bad Baby	Eubie / Kelly		
1998	CatDog	Various characters		
1998	Runaway Rocketboy!	Jimmy Neutron	Pilot	
2000	South Park	Miss Information		
2001	Oswald	Weenie, Catrina, others		
2001–05	Jay Jay the Jet Plane	Jay Jay, Savannah, Herky, Revvin Evan	replacing Mary Kay Bergman	
2001–02	Grim and Evil	Various characters		Resume
2002–06	The Adventures of Jimmy Neutron, Boy Genius	Jimmy Neutron, Amber, Nissa, others		
2002	Fillmore!	Various characters		
2002–07	Playhouse Disney	Clay	Host	Resume
2003–08	The Grim Adventures of Billy & Mandy	Nergal Jr.		
2003–04	LeapFrog video series	Tad (character)		
2003	Castle in the Sky	Sheeta (Young), Madge, Additional Voices	Disney dub	
2004–06	The Jimmy Timmy Power Hour	Jimmy Neutron	crossover episodes	
2004	Stroker and Hoop	Jack's Girl, Miss Squash Casserole		
2006	Danger Rangers	Emily, Mark, Royal Secretary	Episode: "Chem Gems"	
2006	Curious George	Various characters		Resume
2010–13	Planet Sheen	Princess Oomlout (Second Face)		
2012–13	Monster High	Draculaura		
2014	TripTank	Billy	Episode: "Ricky the Rocketship" / "Show for All Ages"	
2015	Be Cool, Scooby-Doo!	Various characters		
2015–21	F Is for Family	Maureen Murphy, Philip Bonfiglio, Bridget Fitzsimmons, others		
2016–present	The Loud House	Miss Allegra, Auntie Pam		
2016–21	Ben 10	Simon Sez, Camperhead #2		
2017–19	Hanazuki: Full of Treasures	Various characters		
2017	Buddy Thunderstruck	Muncie, others		
2017–21	Vampirina	Shriekia		
2019–24	Care Bears: Unlock the Magic	Cheer Bear, Love-a-Lot Bear, Robbie		
2019	Tigtone	Helpy		
2020	Blaze and the Monster Machines	Zuzu	Episode: "The Great Space Race"	
2022–present	Bugs Bunny Builders	Looney Cat Kid, Looney Kangaroo Kid		
2022–24	Monster High	Stheno Gorgon		

=== Anime ===
List of dubbing performances in anime
Year	Title	Role	Notes	Source
1993–95, 2005	Tenchi Muyo! Ryo-Ohki OVAs	Ryo-Ohki	3 OVA series and specials, as Marie Cabbit	
1996–98	Tenchi Universe series	Ryo-Ohki, Mitsuki		
1999–2000	Tenchi in Tokyo	Ryo-Ohki, Yugi		
2005–07	Zatch Bell!	Zatch, others		
2015	Sailor Moon	Diana	VIZ dub	
2015	Sailor Moon Crystal	Diana		
2015	Glitter Force	Candy	Netflix series	Facebook
2017	Glitter Force Doki Doki	Maya Aida	Netflix series	Tweet
2024	Rising Impact	Gawain Nanaumi	Netflix series	Instagram
2025	Ishura	Mestelexil the Box of Desperate Knowledge		

=== Film ===
==== Feature films ====
List of voice performances in feature films
Year	Title	Role	Notes	Source
1992	Aladdin	Additional voices		
1995	Babe	Puppies		
1995	Toy Story	Aliens, Troll, Voice on Intercom at Pizza Planet, additional voices		
1997	Cats Don't Dance	Additional voices		
1999	Toy Story 2	Aliens, Amy		
2001	Jimmy Neutron: Boy Genius	Jimmy Neutron		Resume
2006	Ice Age: The Meltdown	Diatryma Mom		
2008	Horton Hears a Who!	Who Mom		
2013	Despicable Me 2	Additional Voices		
2018	The Christmas Chronicles	Fleck		
2020	The Christmas Chronicles: Part Two	Fleck, Speck		
2021	Sailor Moon Eternal	Diana	Netflix dub	Resume
2022	Minions: The Rise of Gru	Additional Voices		
2023	Chebi: My Fluffy Friend	Chebi	Dub	
2023	The Boy and the Heron	Kazuko	Dub	
2025	The Colors Within	Totsuko's Mother		

==== Direct-to-video and television films ====
List of voice performances in direct-to-video and television films
Year	Title	Role	Notes	Source
1995	The New Adventures of Peter Rabbit	Flopsy, Mopsy, Hopsy, Cottontail, Fluff		
1996	Dot & Spot's Magical Adventure	Dot		
1996	Tenchi the Movie: Tenchi Muyo in Love	Ryo-Ohki		
1998	O' Christmas Tree	Tree, Chipmunk		
1999	The Nuttiest Nutcracker	Marie, Fritz		
2000	Whispers: An Elephant's Tale	Whispers		
2001	Lady and the Tramp II: Scamp's Adventure	Annette		
2001	Vampire Hunter D: Bloodlust	Girl		
2003	Charlotte's Web 2: Wilbur's Great Adventure	Fern		
2003	The Animatrix	Child		
2006	Casper's Scare School	History Teacher, Banana Lady		
2009	Curious George: A Very Monkey Christmas	Gnocchi		
2010	The Legend of Secret Pass	Shelby		
2012	Monster High: Ghouls Rule	Draculaura		
2013	Monster High: 13 Wishes	Draculaura		
2014	Monster High: Frights, Camera, Action!	Draculaura		
2014	Alpha and Omega 3: The Great Wolf Games	Runt		
2014	Legends of Oz: Dorothy's Return	Stenographer		
2014	Monster High: Freaky Fusion	Draculaura		
2014	Alpha and Omega 4: The Legend of the Saw Tooth Cave	Runt		
2015	Alpha and Omega 5: Family Vacation	Runt		
2015	Monster High: Haunted	Draculaura		
2015	Monster High: Boo York, Boo York	Draculaura		
2016	Norm of the North	Little Girl		
2016	Monster High: Great Scarrier Reef	Draculaura		
2016	Alpha and Omega 6: Dino Digs	Runt		
2016	Barbie: Dreamtopia	Otto's Mom		
2016	Welcome to Monster High	Draculaura		
2016	Trolland	Jessica, Adrian, Kid #1		
2016	Alpha and Omega 7: The Big Fureeze	Runt		
2017	Monster High: Electrified	Draculaura		
2017	Alpha and Omega 8: Journey to Bear Kingdom	Runt		

=== Video games ===
List of voice performances in video games
Year	Title	Role	Notes	Source
1990	Ys I & II	Feena	English Language Version	
1995	Wanna Be a Dino Finder	Katie		
1998	I Can Be an Animal Doctor	Katie		
2000	Orphen: Scion of Sorcery	Dortin, Jado		
2001	Crash Bandicoot: The Wrath of Cortex	Coco Bandicoot		
2001	Jimmy Neutron: Boy Genius	Jimmy Neutron		
2001	Final Fantasy X	Bahamut's Fayth		
2002	Jay Jay the Jet Plane: Jay Jay Earns His Wings	Jay Jay, Herky, Savannah, Revvin' Evan		
2002	Jay Jay the Jet Plane: Sky Heroes to the Rescue	Jay Jay, Herky, Savannah, Revvin' Evan		
2002	Jay Jay the Jet Plane: High-Flying Sky Circus	Jay Jay, Herky, Savannah, Revvin' Evan		
2002	Jimmy Neutron vs. Jimmy Negatron	Jimmy Neutron, Jimmy Negatron		
2003	Arc the Lad: Twilight of the Spirits	Bebedora		
2003	The Adventures of Jimmy Neutron Boy Genius: Jet Fusion	Jimmy Neutron		
2003	Crash Nitro Kart	Coco Bandicoot, Polar		
2003	Final Fantasy X-2	Bahamut's Fayth		
2004	Tales of Symphonia	Noishe		
2004	Crash Twinsanity	Coco Bandicoot, Young Dr. Cortex		
2004	The Adventures of Jimmy Neutron Boy Genius: Attack of the Twonkies	Jimmy Neutron		
2004	Nicktoons Movin'	Jimmy Neutron		
2005	Killer7	Love Wilcox		
2005	Crash Tag Team Racing	Coco Bandicoot		
2005	Nicktoons Unite!	Jimmy Neutron		
2006	Ape Escape 3	Monkey Pink (NTSC-U version)		
2006	Over the Hedge	Kid		
2006	Yakuza	Haruka Sawamura		
2006	Nicktoons: Battle for Volcano Island	Jimmy Neutron		
2007	Crash of the Titans	Coco Bandicoot		
2007	Crash of the Titans	Nina Cortex	DS version only	
2007	Nicktoons: Attack of the Toybots	Jimmy Neutron		
2008	God of War: Chains of Olympus	Calliope		
2008	Crash: Mind over Mutant	Coco Bandicoot		
2008	SpongeBob SquarePants Featuring Nicktoons: Globs of Doom	Jimmy Neutron		
2010	No More Heroes 2: Desperate Struggle	Matt Helms, Mimmy		
2010	White Knight Chronicles	Rocco		
2010	God of War III	Calliope		
2011	White Knight Chronicles II	Rocco		
2012	Nicktoons MLB	Jimmy Neutron	Nintendo 3DS version only	
2012	Street Fighter x Tekken	PAC-MAN		
2013	The Wonderful 101	Luka Alan Smithee, Young Will		
2014	Guild Wars 2	Taimi, others		
2016	FNaF World	Chica's Magic Rainbow		
2017	Mobius Final Fantasy	Elder Moogle		
2017	Crash Bandicoot N. Sane Trilogy	Coco Bandicoot, Tawna Bandicoot		
2017	Wolfenstein II: The New Colossus	Young William Blazkowicz		
2019	Crash Team Racing: Nitro Fueled	Coco Bandicoot, Baby Coco, Nina Cortex, Pasadena O'Possum		
2020	Genshin Impact	Tubby, Sedene, Delaroche	English Language Version	
2021	Crash Bandicoot: On the Run!	Coco Bandicoot, Nina Cortex, Fake Coco		
2022	Nickelodeon Kart Racers 3: Slime Speedway	Jimmy Neutron		
2023	The Sims 4	Infants		
2023	Nickelodeon All-Star Brawl 2	Jimmy Neutron		
2024	Like a Dragon: Infinite Wealth	Additional voices		
2024	Cookie Run: Kingdom	Green Tea Mousse Cookie		
2024	Granblue Fantasy: Relink	Maglielle		
2025	Nicktoons & The Dice of Destiny	Jimmy Neutron		
2026	God of War Sons of Sparta	Calliope		
2026	Grand Theft Auto VI	The Local Population		

=== Live action ===
List of acting performances in television
Year	Title	Role	Notes	Source
1988	Hey Vern, It's Ernest!	Skeeter / Willie the Robots Friend / Alien Child		
1994	Tattooed Teenage Alien Fighters from Beverly Hills	Pixel(voice)	Episode: "The Opiate from the Future"	
1999	Party of Five	Mrs. Pinchon	Episode: "Fate, Hope and Charity"	
2008–09	iCarly	Principal Ted Franklin's Assistant	3 episodes	

List of acting performances in theatrical films
Year	Title	Role	Notes	Source
1993	Free Willy	Jesse (stunt double only)		
2007	Jekyll	Cancer Patient		
2018	Gamers Anonymous	Phyllis		

List of acting performances in direct-to-video and television films
Year	Title	Role	Notes	Source
1990	Archie: To Riverdale and Back Again	Midge Mason	Television film	
2004	Comic Book: The Movie	Debbie Newman		

=== Theme parks ===
List of voice performances in theme park rides
Year	Title	Role	Notes	Source
1994	Walt Disney's Carousel of Progress	Patricia	1994 version	
2003	Jimmy Neutron's Nicktoon Blast	Jimmy Neutron		
2027	Walt Disney's Carousel of Progress	Grandmother	2027 version	

=== Other roles ===
- The character Speedy in Alka-Seltzer commercials.
- The character Zack Putterman in Duracell commercials.

== Discography ==
Derryberry has released several children's music albums, and also was a member of the folk/country music group Honey Pig.

- What A Way To Play (2006)
- Very Derryberry (2007)
- Baby Banana (2009)
- Gotta Go Green (2024)
- Go to Sleep (2025)

With Honey Pig

- Exactly As Were Are
- Clueless You (EP)
