= John A. Davis =

American animated filmmaker (born 1961)

- Born: John Alexander Davis; October 26, 1961 (age 65); Dallas, Texas, U.S.
- Education: Southern Methodist University
- Occupations: Film director; producer; screenwriter; animator; composer; voice actor; astrophotographer
- Years active: 1979–present
- Known for: Jimmy Neutron: Boy Genius; The Adventures of Jimmy Neutron, Boy Genius
- Spouse: Kim Davis

John Alexander Davis (born October 26, 1961) is an American film director, screenwriter, animator, voice actor, composer, and astrophotographer known for his work both in stop-motion animation as well as computer animation, live action and live-action/CGI hybrids. Davis is best known for directing the Nickelodeon animated film Jimmy Neutron: Boy Genius, which earned him an Academy Award nomination for the Best Animated Feature, and creating its sequel television series The Adventures of Jimmy Neutron, Boy Genius.

== Early life ==
Davis began animating as a child using his parents' 8 mm camera to film action figures in stop motion. His interest in animation began when he watched a stop motion film called Icharus at a film festival. He worked on the stop motion film The Bermuda Triangle in 1981 while still attending Southern Methodist University, where he graduated in 1984.

== Career ==
Soon after his graduation Davis joined the animation company K&H Productions, working with 2-D animator Keith Alcorn. Soon, Davis made the transition from claymation to 2-D animation with Alcorn's help. K&H did production work for commercials, public-access television cable TV animation, and film festivals. K&H Productions declared bankruptcy in early 1987; that same year DNA Productions was founded.

Davis came up with the idea for Jimmy Neutron: Boy Genius (originally named Johnny Quasar) sometime during the 1980s and wrote a script titled Runaway Rocketboy (later the name of the second pilot) which was later abandoned. While moving to a new house in the early 1990s, he stumbled upon the script and re-worked it as a short film titled Johnny Quasar and presented it in SIGGRAPH where he met Steve Oedekerk and worked on a television series as well as the film.

In 2006, he directed the film The Ant Bully after being approached by Tom Hanks to direct the film. Production on the film made Davis resign from production of Jimmy Neutron in January 2003. He gave his position away as executive in charge of production to Steve Oedekerk.

Davis was set to direct an upcoming feature film based on Neopets with Warner Bros., together with producer Dylan Sellers and writer Rob Lieber. It was originally set to release on April 20, 2009, but was changed to 2011 and later changed to winter of 2012, before finally being cancelled with no other projects announced.

In 2014, Davis announced that Xing Xing Digital Corporation and Pelagius Entertainment had been selected to co-produce his upcoming animated film Smart, with writers Joel Cohen (writer) and Alec Sokolow.. However, the film was cancelled when Xing Xing went defunct in 2018 due to a small bit of controversy back in July 26th, 2016, in the Fireman Sam episode Troubled Waters, where Elvis trips over a piece of paper with Surah Mulk, Verses 13–26 from the Quran on it, resulting to HiT Entertainment and Mattel cutting ties with them completely, and WildBrain (former name DHX Media Inc.) being brought in to take over the animation.

== Nominations ==
In 2000, Davis was up for an Emmy along with 8 others in the category Outstanding Animated Program (For Programming More Than One Hour) for Olive, the Other Reindeer, but lost to Discovery Channel's Walking with Dinosaurs.

In 2002, Davis was nominated for an Academy Award along with Steve Oedekerk in the category of Best Animated Feature for Jimmy Neutron: Boy Genius.

== Filmography ==
Short film

Year	Title	Director	Writer	Producer	Animator	Notes
1992	Captain Weirdbeard and His Merry Swabs	Yes	Yes	Yes	No	
1995	The Adventures of Johnny Quasar	Yes	Yes	Yes	Yes	
1997	Santa vs. The Snowman	Yes	Yes	Yes	Supervisor	Also technical director
2002	Santa vs. the Snowman 3D	Yes	Yes	Yes	Supervisor	

Feature film

Year	Title	Director	Writer	Producer
2001	Jimmy Neutron: Boy Genius	Yes	Yes	Yes
2006	The Ant Bully	Yes	Yes	Yes

Television

Year	Title	Writer	Producer	Creator
2002–06	The Adventures of Jimmy Neutron, Boy Genius	Yes	Yes	Yes

Voice actor

Year	Title	Role
1991-2004	Nanna & Lil' Puss Puss	Puss Puss
1992	The Tale of Nippoless Nippleby	Nippoless Nippleby
1998	Cartoon Sushi	Additional Voices
2001	Jimmy Neutron: Boy Genius	Octapuke Kid, Guard and Bennie
2006	The Ant Bully	Ant #19

Other roles

Year	Title	Role
1984	Bloodsuckers from Outer Space	Visual Effects (Uncredited)
1989	Scaredy Cat!	Special Thanks
1990	Macon County War	Composer
1992	Frog Baseball	Sound Recordist, Special Thanks
1993	Basic Values: Sex, Shock & Censorship in the 1990s	Composer
1999	Olive, the Other Reindeer	Animation Director
2006	The Ant Bully	Video game director
2010–13	Planet Sheen	Creative consultant
2016	Cartoons VS Cancer	Himself
2016	Nickelodeon Animation Podcast	Himself

== Astrophotography ==
Since about 2007, Davis has become a recognized astrophotographer, publishing high-resolution, generally wide-field images in astronomy magazines, and in NASA's Astronomy Picture of the Day.

In 2009, Davis largely founded and continues to lead APSIG, the Astrophotography Special Interest Group, associated with the Texas Astronomical Society of Dallas.

== See also ==
- Category:Films directed by John A. Davis
