= Barnyard (film) =

2006 animated film directed by Steve Oedekerk

- Theatrical release poster
- Directed by: Steve Oedekerk
- Written by: Steve Oedekerk
- Produced by: Paul Marshal; Steve Oedekerk
- Starring: Kevin James; Courteney Cox; Sam Elliott; Danny Glover; Wanda Sykes; Andie MacDowell; David Koechner
- Edited by: Paul D. Calder; Billy Weber
- Music by: John Debney
- Production companies: Paramount Pictures; Nickelodeon Movies; O Entertainment
- Distributed by: Paramount Pictures
- Release dates: July 30, 2006 (ArcLight Hollywood); August 4, 2006 (United States)
- Running time: 90 minutes
- Country: United States
- Language: English
- Budget: $51 million
- Box office: $119 million

Barnyard (also known as Barnyard: The Original Party Animals) is a 2006 American animated adventure comedy film written and directed by Steve Oedekerk. The film stars the voices of Kevin James, Courteney Cox, Sam Elliott, Danny Glover, Wanda Sykes, Andie MacDowell and David Koechner. It tells the story of Otis, a carefree Holstein bull, who learns the value of responsibility when he becomes the leader of his farm home's community after his adoptive father's death from a coyote attack.

Barnyard premiered at ArcLight Hollywood on July 30, 2006, and was released in the United States on August 4 by Paramount Pictures. The film received mixed-to-negative reviews from critics but was a commercial success, grossing $119 million worldwide against a $51 million production budget. A sequel television series, Back at the Barnyard, premiered on Nickelodeon in 2007.

== Plot ==
Otis, a carefree Holstein bull, lives on a livestock farm in the Arizona town of Oedeville. The animals are allowed to reveal their anthropomorphism when humans are not looking. Otis prefers to have fun with his friends: Pip the mouse, Pig the pig, Freddy the ferret, and Peck the rooster, to the disapproval of his adoptive father, Ben, and the farm's leader.

One evening, Otis convinces Ben to cover his night watch, so he can attend a massive party in the barn and impress Daisy, a pregnant cow who recently arrived at the farm with her best friend Bessy. Before Otis leaves, Ben says he saw the stars dance the night he found him as a calf. As the farm animals party, the sadistic coyote Dag and his pack attempt to raid the farm's hen coop. Ben arrives and successfully fends the coyotes off alone, but is mortally wounded and dies in Otis's embrace.

Following Ben's death, the animals elect Otis as the new leader. He struggles with his new position and duties, which include salvaging an incident in which the farmer witnesses the animals partying and Miles, an elderly mule who was Ben's best friend and assistant until his death, knocking him unconscious. Leaving Freddy and Peck to guard the chicken coop, Otis joins the Jersey Cows, a trio of trouble-making cattle, in getting revenge against Snotty Boy, a cow-tipping bully. After narrowly avoiding the authorities, Otis returns for his night watch and shares a tender moment with Daisy, who recalls the time her late husband and fellow cattle were lost to a storm.

Otis soon encounters Dag, who easily deters him by exploiting his weakness as a leader and guilt over Ben's death. Dag arranges to periodically steal animals from the farm, threatening to kill them all if Otis interferes. Ashamed, Otis decides to abandon the farm, but relents after learning that the coyotes have kidnapped the hens, including Etta and her young daughter Maddy, during the day behind his back.

Encouraged by Miles, Otis sets out to confront Dag alone at his wrecking yard den. Initially outnumbered by the coyotes, Otis' friends arrive to fight alongside him. Together, they defeat the pack, with Otis warning Dag never to threaten their home again. The animals hijack motorcycles and drive home, where Daisy gives birth to a calf named Ben after Otis' father. Otis vows to protect the farm as his father did before, watching the stars form images of him, Daisy, and young Ben dancing together.

== Voice cast ==
- Kevin James as Otis, a carefree Holstein bull and adopted son of Ben; he becomes the farm's eventual leader following Ben's death.
- Courteney Cox as Daisy, a kindhearted, widowed and pregnant cow who becomes Otis' love interest.
- Jeffrey Garcia as Pip, a wisecracking mouse and Otis' best friend.
- Tino Insana as Pig, an unkempt, well-meaning pig and one of Otis' friends.
- Cam Clarke as Freddy, a dimwitted, neurotic ferret and one of Otis' friends.
- Rob Paulsen as Peck, an intelligent but physically weak rooster and one of Otis' friends.
  - Paulsen also voices a gopher and one of the pizza delivery twins.
- David Koechner as Dag, the sadistic leader of a coyote pack seeking to hunt and eat the farm's animals, namely the hens.
- Sam Elliott as Ben, Otis' adoptive father and original leader of the farm.
- Danny Glover as Miles, an elderly mule and Ben's best friend who was the assistant leader of the farm until Ben's death.
- Wanda Sykes as Bessy, Daisy's sassy friend and fellow cow.
- Dom Irrera as Duke, an overweight Border Collie serving as the farm's pet sheep dog.
- S. Scott Bullock as Eddy, the leader of the Jersey Cows, who speak with New Jersey accents.
- John DiMaggio as Bud, a member of the Jersey Cows.
  - DiMaggio also voices Frederick O'Hanlon, a local police officer.
- Maurice LaMarche as Igg, a member of the Jersey Cows.
- Maria Bamford as Noreen "Nora" Beady, the farmer's neighbor and Snotty Boy's aunt, who is aware of animals' anthropomorphism.
- Fred Tatasciore as Farmer Buyer, the owner of the farm that Otis and his friends live on.
- Andie MacDowell as Etta, one of the farm's hens and Maddy's mother.
- Madeline Lovejoy as Maddy, Etta's daughter who looks up to Otis.
- Earthquake as Root, a handsome rooster and Peck's rival for the hens' attention.
- Steve Oedekerk as Eugene "Snotty Boy" Goldner, the Beadys' nephew who is cruel to animals.
  - Oedekerk also voices Nathaniel Randall "Nathan" Beady III, the farmer's neighbor, Nora's husband and the reluctant uncle of Snotty Boy; Reginald Goldner, Snotty Boy's father; and one of the pizza delivery twins.
- Jill Talley as Serena Goldner, Snotty Boy's mother.
- Laraine Newman and Katie Leigh as Snotty Boy's friends.

Archival recordings of Shaggy's "Boombastic" were used for the performance of Biggie Cheese, a mouse musician.

== Production ==
=== Development ===
Development of Barnyard began when writer and director Steve Oedekerk explored the idea of what farm animals might do when humans were not watching. The concept was inspired by the familiar animated-film premise of giving everyday objects or animals secret lives, while focusing specifically on the world of a farm. Oedekerk developed the project through his company O Entertainment and established Omation Animation Studio to produce the film. Barnyard became Omation’s first feature-length animated production, with the studio handling the computer-generated animation.

The filmmakers designed the story around Otis, a carefree cow who must eventually accept responsibility after the loss of his father, Ben. Oedekerk said the appeal of the story came from combining broad comedy with a coming-of-age story, allowing the characters’ animal behavior to reflect human experiences.

=== Casting ===
The voice cast was assembled with a mixture of comedy performers and dramatic actors. Kevin James was cast as Otis, bringing an energetic comedic style to the main character, while Sam Elliott voiced Ben, Otis’s father and the respected leader of the farm.

Other major cast members included Courteney Cox as Daisy, Danny Glover as Miles, Wanda Sykes as Bessy, and David Koechner as Dag.

The filmmakers looked for performers who could communicate personality through voice alone, since the animated characters depended heavily on vocal performances to establish humor and emotion.

=== Animation ===
Barnyard was created using computer-generated imagery and marked the first feature film produced by Omation Animation Studio. The animation team focused on creating expressive animal characters while maintaining a stylized cartoon appearance. One of the film’s central animation challenges was portraying farm animals with human-like movement and expressions. The animators developed character designs that allowed cows, chickens, pigs, and other animals to walk upright, gesture, dance, and perform human activities while still retaining recognizable animal features.

Supervising technical director Jason Barlow discussed the challenge of animating the animals’ unusual behavior, explaining that the team had to create a world where the characters could transition naturally between animal and human-like actions. The production used a combination of digital modeling, character rigging, lighting, and rendering techniques to create the film’s farm environment and large cast of animated characters.

== Soundtrack ==
Barnyard (Music from the Motion Picture)

Soundtrack album by Various artists
- Released: August 22, 2006
- Recorded: 2005–2006 ("Wild 'N Free" was recorded in 1994; "Boombastic" was recorded in 1995)
- Genres: Alternative rock, Pop
- Length: 36:58
- Label: Bulletproof

The film's score is done by John Debney, who also previously scored Jimmy Neutron: Boy Genius (2001). The soundtrack was released on August 22, 2006, by Bulletproof Records. It includes an original song by indie pop band the Starlight Mints and "You Gotta Move" by Aerosmith.

Track listing
No.	Title	Performed by	Length
1.	"Mud"	North Mississippi Allstars	2:30
2.	"Hittin' the Hay"	North Mississippi Allstars featuring Les Claypool	2:23
3.	"Down on the Farm (They All Ask For You)"	Kevin James and North Mississippi Allstars	1:12
4.	"I Won't Back Down"	Sam Elliott	2:12
5.	"2StepN"	North Mississippi Allstars	2:46
6.	"Hillbilly Holla (End Credits)"	North Mississippi Allstars	3:25
7.	"Kick It"	The Bo-Keys	2:33
8.	"Father, Son"	Peter Gabriel	4:56
9.	"Freedom Is a Voice"	Bobby McFerrin and Russell Ferrante	4:17
10.	"Popsickle"	Starlight Mints	3:01
11.	"Wild 'N' Free"	Rednex	3:37
12.	"Boombastic"	Shaggy	4:06
Total length:			36:58

Other songs featured in the film:

- "Do Your Thing" – Basement Jaxx
- "The Barnyard Dance" – Lewis Arquette and Family
- "You Gotta Move" – Aerosmith
- "Sister Rosetta" – Alabama 3
- "Slow Ride" – Paul D. Calder (as Paul Calder)
- "Truck Song" – Paul D. Calder (as Paul Calder)

== Release ==
Barnyard premiered at ArcLight Hollywood on July 30, 2006, and was theatrically released in the United States on August 4, 2006, by Paramount Pictures. It was previously slated for a holiday 2005 release, but got pushed back to January 13, 2006, then to July 28. It was then delayed by another week, bringing its current release date up.

=== Home media ===
Barnyard was released by Paramount Home Entertainment on DVD on December 12, 2006, in separate widescreen and full-screen versions. The DVD includes the alternate opening, a "Barnyard Bop" music video, a comic book creator, and a commentary by Steve Oedekerk and Paul Marshal. Barnyard was released on Blu-ray for the first time on January 25, 2022.

== Reception ==
=== Box office ===
Barnyard opened with $5.5 million on its first day, and went on to gross $15.8 million during its opening weekend, ranking number two behind Talladega Nights: The Ballad of Ricky Bobby ($47 million). During its first week, it made $24 million, maintaining its second-place rank. In its second weekend, the film suffered a decline of -39% with $9.7 million and dropped to number four, facing competition against newcomers World Trade Center and Step Up.

At the end of its theatrical run, Barnyard grossed $73 million in the United States and Canada, and $46 million in other territories, for a worldwide total of $119 million, against its reported budget of $51 million.

=== Critical response ===
On the review aggregator website Rotten Tomatoes, 22% of 94 critics' reviews are positive, with an average rating of 4.5/10. The website's consensus reads: "Unimaginative and unfunny, this tale of barnyard mischief borders on 'udder' creepiness and adds little to this summer's repertoire of animated films." Metacritic, which uses a weighted average, assigned the film a score of 42 out of 100, based on 24 critics, indicating "mixed or average" reviews. Audiences polled by CinemaScore assigned the film an average grade of "B+" on an A+ to F scale.

Roger Moore of the Orlando Sentinel gave the film 2 stars out of 5, saying that, "with Barnyard, another quick-and-dirty 'all-star cast' mess churned out by the digital start-ups hired to steal some of Pixar's cash, the year that computer-generated animation 'jumps the shark' becomes official. Politically correct, anatomically incorrect, and ugly to look at, the only thing that saves Barnyard is writer (and director) Steve Oedekerk's gift for gags and almost-edgy humor." Kyle Smith of the New York Post gave the film a score of 1.5/4, saying that "if you want to punish your kids, send them to bed without dinner. If you want to disturb, frighten, and depress them while making sure they fail biology, take them to the animated feature Barnyard." Gregory Kirschling of Entertainment Weekly criticized the film's plot, giving it a C+ score and said that "it feels like Barnyard swipes too much of its plot from The Lion King."

On the positive side, J. R. Jones of the Chicago Reader enjoyed Barnyard, saying that "it's way funnier than many of the R-rated comedies I've seen lately, though Oedekerk seems to have ignored the writer's edict to know your subject—most of his cows are male. The CGI is excellent, with characters whose depth and solidity suggest Nick Park's clay animations. The laughs subside near the end as the requisite moral kicks in, but this is still that rare kids' movie I'd recommend to parents and non-parents alike." Claudia Puig of USA Today gave the film a score of 2.5/4, calling it "a sweet and mildly funny movie that will entertain young audiences, but one aspect is utterly mystifying: The two main characters, father and son bovine creatures, have large, distracting udders."

=== Accolades ===
Year	Award	Category	Recipients	Results	Ref.
2007	2006 Stinkers Bad Movie Awards	Worst Movie Title	Paramount, Nickelodeon	Nominated	
2007	2006 Stinkers Bad Movie Awards	Worst Animated Film	Paramount, Nickelodeon	Nominated	

== Video game ==
A video game based on the film was produced by THQ and Blue Tongue Entertainment. It is an adventure game in which the player names their own male or female cow and walk around the barnyard and play mini-games, pull pranks on humans, and ride bikes. The game was released for PlayStation 2, GameCube, Wii, Microsoft Windows, and Game Boy Advance.

== Television series ==
On September 29, 2007, a sequel television series titled Back at the Barnyard, premiered on Nickelodeon. Chris Hardwick replaced Kevin James in the role of Otis, and Leigh-Allyn Baker voiced new character Abby, who replaces Daisy, Otis' love interest from the film. The series had a considerably lighter tone than the film and ran for two seasons, ending on November 12, 2011.
