= Steve Oedekerk =

American filmmaker, actor and stand-up comedian (born 1961)

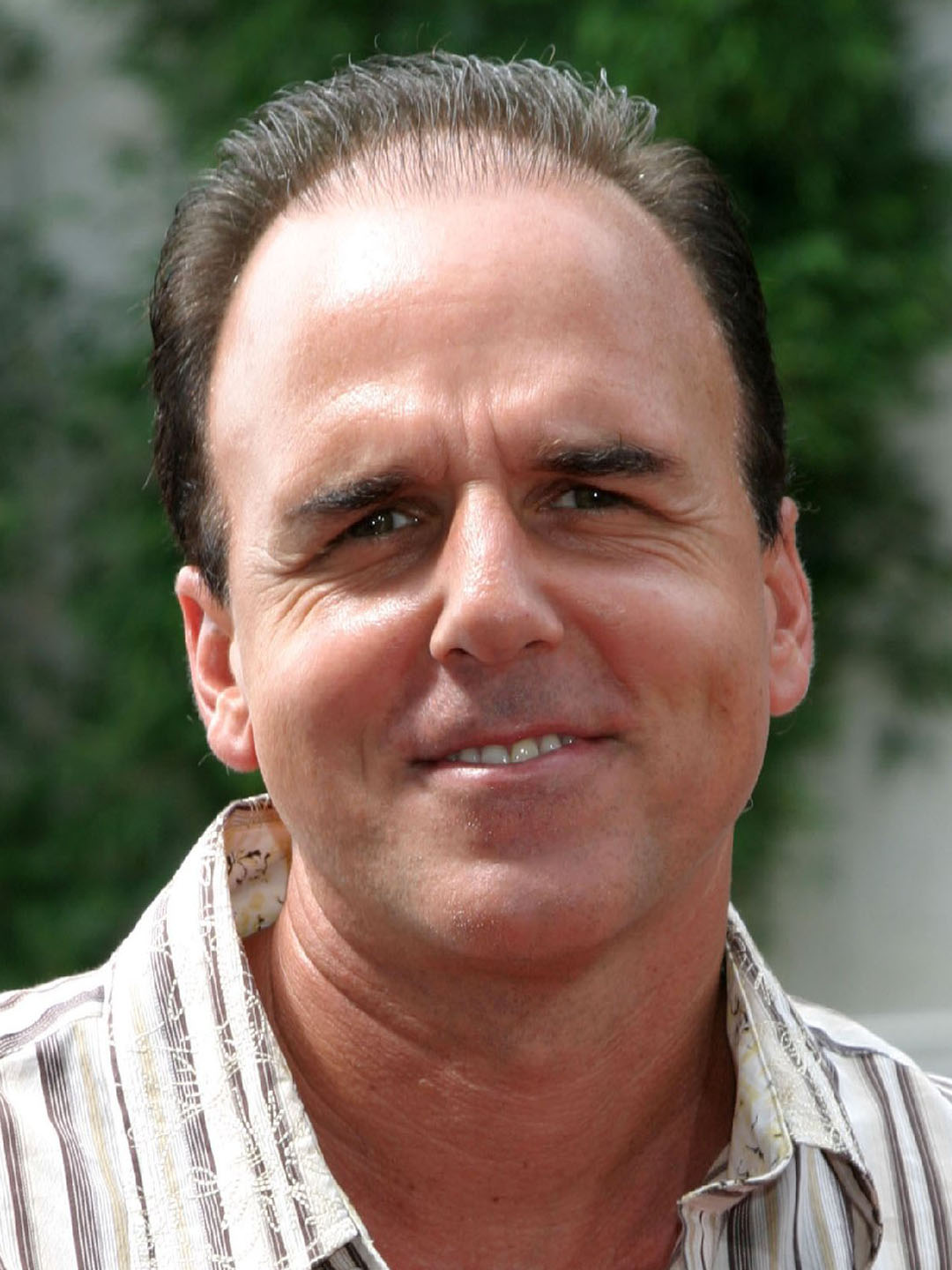
- Oedekerk in 2006
- Born: Steven Brent Oedekerk; November 27, 1961 (age 64); Seattle, Washington, U.S.
- Other name: Steve O.
- Occupations: Filmmaker; actor; stand-up comedian
- Years active: 1983–present
- Notable work: Kung Pow: Enter the Fist; Jimmy Neutron: Boy Genius; Barnyard
- Children: 2

Steven Brent Oedekerk (born November 27, 1961) is an American filmmaker, actor and stand-up comedian. He is best known for his collaborations with actor and comedian Jim Carrey and director Tom Shadyac (particularly the Ace Ventura franchise), his series of "Thumbmation" shorts and his film Kung Pow! Enter the Fist (2002), along with his films Santa vs. the Snowman 3D, Barnyard, and The Nutty Professor remake. For his film Jimmy Neutron: Boy Genius, Oedekerk was nominated for an Academy Award.

== Early life ==
Oedekerk was born in Seattle, Washington; he was raised by his mother Rena Borlandeli and father Martin Oedekerk in Huntington Beach, California. He attended Mater Dei High School in Santa Ana, California and Golden West College in Huntington Beach. He is of Dutch Frisian, Irish, Hungarian, and Italian (Lombard) descent. His mother is an immigrant from Magnago, Italy. His paternal grandfather was an Afrikaner born in South Africa to Dutch parents.

== Career ==
Throughout his career, Oedekerk has appeared in and created several television specials for NBC, ABC, and UPN. He also contributed his writing talents to FOX during the late 1980s and through the early 1990s. It was during this time that Oedekerk befriended fellow comic/actor Jim Carrey while working on the television series In Living Color during its 1990–1994 run; this was the first of numerous collaborations between the two.

Prior to his successful contributions to several unknown episodes in the Color TV series, he wrote and starred in his first independent/directorial film, Smart Alex (1987). It wasn't until 1991 that Oedekerk was attached not only as a writer, but also as the protagonist, as Thane Furrows in the film High Strung. Jim Carrey also starred opposite him in the role of Death, although he went uncredited. They eventually developed a strong friendship, which still exists today. Shortly afterward, Oedekerk again worked alongside Carrey as the project consultant for Tom Shadyac's first film Ace Ventura: Pet Detective (1994). The film became a break-out success and he was given the opportunity to both direct and write its sequel, Ace Ventura: When Nature Calls (1995). This time Oedekerk directed and wrote the movie after Shadyac left before filming. The sequel proved to be more successful, surpassing the box office gross of the original. Despite this, both Oedekerk and Carrey wanted to pursue other projects, but still remained friends.

Following the Ace Ventura franchise, Oedekerk co-wrote The Nutty Professor (1996), which was also directed by Shadyac for Universal Pictures; it became one of the highest-grossing films of that year. He soon wrote, directed and also had a cameo appearance in Nothing to Lose (1997), starring Tim Robbins and Martin Lawrence. Oedekerk took a hiatus from directing major film productions for the rest of the 1990s, but continued to write screenplays, including Patch Adams (1998), Nutty Professor II: The Klumps (2000), Jimmy Neutron: Boy Genius (2001), Kung Pow! Enter the Fist (2002) (which he directed, wrote and starred in), Bruce Almighty (2003) and Barnyard (2006) (which he directed, wrote, produced, and voiced various characters). In 2003, he signed a first look deal with Universal.

In 2007, Oedekerk produced the screenplay and story for the Bruce Almighty sequel, Evan Almighty; again, Shadyac directed both films. He has also been commissioned to write the screenplay for the Ripley's Believe It or Not! film adaptation; Jim Carrey has since been cast in the title role. No news involving the project has been reported since.

In February 2009, Universal Pictures announced that Steve Oedekerk would be penning a film adaptation of the Stretch Armstrong superhero doll. As of 2016, the film is left in development hell with an animated series currently in the works.

In 2015, it was announced that a sequel to Kung Pow is currently in the works with him returning to write and direct.

== O Entertainment ==
O Entertainment
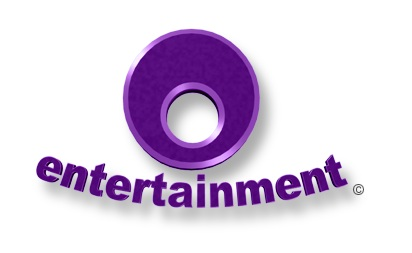
- Type: Production company
- Industry: Animation; Live Action
- Founded: December 7, 1990; 35 years ago
- Founder: Steve Oedekerk
- Defunct: February 19, 2013; 13 years ago
- Fate: Dormancy and closed
- Successor: O Studio Productions LLC; Thirsty Boy LLC
- Headquarters: Burbank, California, U.S.
- Divisions: Omation Animation Studio
- Website: oentertainment.com (archived 2013-06-17)

O Entertainment was a production company founded by Steve Oedekerk in 1990. O Entertainment's productions include the Thumbmation series (Thumb Wars, Bat Thumb, Thumbtanic, etc.), Santa vs. the Snowman 3D, Jimmy Neutron: Boy Genius, The Adventures of Jimmy Neutron, Boy Genius, Back at the Barnyard, and Planet Sheen. The animation division, Omation Animation Studio, was founded by Oedekerk himself and hired animators who previously worked in DNA Productions after the studio closed down in 2006.

In 1997, Oedekerk created and starred in a variety special, featuring computer animation, entitled The O Show (also known as steve.oedekerk.com). He is also executive producer of the animated series The Adventures of Jimmy Neutron, Boy Genius on Nickelodeon.

== Omation Animation Studio ==
Omation Animation Studio, Inc.
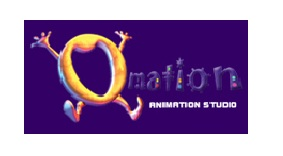
- Type: Division
- Industry: Animation
- Predecessor: DNA Productions
- Founded: September 13, 2002; 24 years ago
- Founder: Steve Oedekerk
- Defunct: March 30, 2013; 13 years ago
- Fate: Dormancy and closed
- Successor: Nickelodeon Animation Studio
- Headquarters: 204, Avenida Fabricante, San Clemente, California, 92672, U.S.
- Parent: O Entertainment (2002-2013)
- Website: www.omaiton.com (archived 2009-10-31)

Oedekerk founded Omation Animation Studio (commonly known as Omation) in 2002 as a division of O Entertainment. Their first animation project was the feature film Barnyard (which Oedekerk wrote, directed, produced, and performed as a voice actor). Around 2006–2007, the studio began production on a Nicktoon based on the film titled Back at the Barnyard. The series premiered on Nickelodeon on September 29, 2007. A second season followed, and six additional episodes aired on Nickelodeon's sister channel Nicktoons from September 12, 2011, to November 12, 2011. Following the closure of DNA Productions in 2006, many of the employees there moved to Omation.

Oedekerk also gained popularity with his series of "Thumbmation" shorts: Thumb Wars, Bat Thumb, The Godthumb, Frankenthumb, The Blair Thumb, and Thumbtanic.

Following the failure of Planet Sheen and its subsequent cancellation in 2013, the studio was shut down in late March 2013.

== Filmography ==
=== Film ===
Year	Title	Director	Writer	Producer	Notes
1987	Smart Alex	Yes	Yes	No	Incomplete, never released
1991	High Strung	No	Yes	No	
1995	Ace Ventura: When Nature Calls	Yes	Yes	No	
1996	The Nutty Professor	No	Yes	No	
1997	Nothing to Lose	Yes	Yes	No	
1997	Santa vs. the Snowman 3D	No	Creator	Yes	Short film
1998	Patch Adams	No	Yes	Co	
2000	Nutty Professor II: The Klumps	No	Story	No	
2001	Jimmy Neutron: Boy Genius	No	Yes	Yes	Nominated – Academy Award for Best Animated Feature
2002	Kung Pow! Enter the Fist	Yes	Yes	Yes	also songwriter: (Les Aliens)
2002	Juwanna Mann	No	No	Executive	
2003	Bruce Almighty	No	Yes	Executive	
2006	Barnyard	Yes	Yes	Yes	
2007	Evan Almighty	No	Yes	No	
2011	Cowboys & Aliens	No	Story	No	

Other credits

Year	Title	Role
1994	Ace Ventura: Pet Detective	Executive consultant
2015	Harbinger Down	Producers would like to thank
2024	Ricky Stanicky	Additional literary material

Acting roles

Year	Title	Role	Notes
1987	Smart Alex	Alex	Incomplete, never released
1988	Casual Sex?	Joey	
1991	High Strung	Thane Furrows	
1997	Nothing to Lose	Security Guard Baxter	Cameo
2002	Kung Pow! Enter the Fist	The Chosen One	
2002	Santa vs. the Snowman 3D	Sno' Hellton	Voice only
2006	Barnyard	Snotty Boy / Pizza Twin #2 / Mr. Beady / Snotty Boy's Father	Voice only

=== Television ===
Year	Title	Creator	Director	Executive Producer	Writer	Notes
1990–1994	In Living Color	No	No	No	Yes	Started in 1992
1997	The O Show	Yes	Yes	Yes	Yes	TV movie
1999–present	Thumbs!	Yes	Yes	Yes	Yes	
2002–2006	The Adventures of Jimmy Neutron: Boy Genius	No	No	Yes	Yes	Writer, Time is Money
2007–2011	Back at the Barnyard	Yes	Yes	Yes	Yes	
2010–2013	Planet Sheen	Yes	Yes	Yes	Yes	

Acting roles

Year	Title	Role	Notes
1983	Star Search	Contestant	
1987–1988	Comedy Club (1987–1988)	Himself	
1989	Full House	Himself	Episode: "Star Search"
1997	The O Show	Himself	TV movie
1999–present	Thumbs!	Multiple	Voice only
2007–2011	Back at the Barnyard	Snotty Boy, Mr. Beady, Additional voices	Voice only
