= Jake Goldberg =

American actor (born 1996)

- Education: University of Colorado Boulder
- Occupation: Actor
- Years active: 2006–present

Jake Goldberg is an American actor who is best known for voicing Pablo in the Nickelodeon animated series The Backyardigans and for portraying Greg Feder in Grown Ups and Grown Ups 2. On January 15, 2014, Goldberg was nominated for a Golden Raspberry Award, along with the rest of the cast of the film Grown Ups 2. He attended the University of Colorado Boulder.

== Career ==
In 2006, Goldberg provided additional voices, specifically Helmet Boy for the CGI film The Ant Bully, based on the book by John Nickle. He was cast as the voice of Pablo in Nick Jr.'s The Backyardigans for the last three seasons, replacing Zach Tyler Eisen from the first season in the same year. In 2008, he appeared as Adam Tremblay in an episode of Law & Order: Special Victims Unit. In 2009, he appeared in an episode of NBC's 30 Rock as Connor. In 2010, he had roles in film as young Scarlip in Choose and Greg Feder in Grown Ups. In 2013, Goldberg reprised the role in Grown Ups 2. In 2025, he appeared as a contestant on Season 4 of Next Level Chef, but was eliminated in the auditions episodes.

== Filmography ==
=== Film ===
| Year | Title | Role | Notes |
|---|---|---|---|
| 2006 | The Ant Bully | Helmet Boy (voice) | |
| 2006 | The Ant Bully | Nob (voice) | |
| 2006 | The Ant Bully | Teammate #1 (voice) | |
| 2010 | Grown Ups | Greg Feder | |
| 2011 | Choose | Young Nathan Jones | |
| 2013 | Grown Ups 2 | Greg Feder | |
| 2022 | The Keys | Blake | Short film |
| TBA | Grown Ups 3 | Greg Feder | Filming |

=== Television ===
| Year | Title | Role | Notes |
|---|---|---|---|
| 2006–2013 | The Backyardigans | Pablo (voice) | Main role (season 2–4) |
| 2008 | Law & Order: Special Victims Unit | Adam Tremblay | Episode: "Unorthodox" |
| 2009 | 30 Rock | Connor | Episode: "Jackie Jormp-Jomp" |
| 2021 | Bull | Karl Langford | Episode: "To Save a Life" |
| 2025 | Next Level Chef | Himself | Episode: "Social Media Chef Auditions" |
| 2026 | The Savant † | Isaac | |

=== Video games ===
| Year | Title | Role | Notes |
|---|---|---|---|
| 2009 | The Backyardigans | Pablo (voice) | |
| 2010 | Nickelodeon Fit | Pablo (voice) | |
