= Grown Ups (film) =

2010 film by Dennis Dugan

- Theatrical release poster
- Directed by: Dennis Dugan
- Written by: Adam Sandler; Fred Wolf
- Produced by: Adam Sandler; Jack Giarraputo
- Starring: Adam Sandler; Kevin James; Chris Rock; David Spade; Rob Schneider; Salma Hayek; Maria Bello; Maya Rudolph; Cameron Boyce
- Cinematography: Theo van de Sande
- Edited by: Tom Costain
- Music by: Rupert Gregson-Williams
- Production companies: Columbia Pictures; Happy Madison Productions; Relativity Media
- Distributed by: Sony Pictures Releasing
- Release date: June 25, 2010
- Running time: 102 minutes
- Country: United States
- Language: English
- Budget: $75 million
- Box office: $272.2 million

Grown Ups is a 2010 American comedy film starring Adam Sandler, Kevin James, Chris Rock, David Spade, and Rob Schneider. The film was directed by Dennis Dugan, and written by Sandler and Fred Wolf. Salma Hayek, Maria Bello, and Maya Rudolph appear in supporting roles. The film's plot tells the story of five lifelong friends who won their junior high school basketball championship in 1978. They reunite three decades later for a 4th of July weekend after learning about the death of their former coach.

Produced by Sandler's Happy Madison Productions in collaboration with Relativity Media, Grown Ups was released in the United States on June 25, 2010, by Columbia Pictures. Despite receiving negative reviews from critics, it grossed $272.2 million against a budget of $75 million, became the highest-grossing Happy Madison film.

A sequel, Grown Ups 2, was released in 2013, with an upcoming third film currently in development as of 2026.

== Plot ==
In 1978, childhood friends Lenny Feder, Eric Lamonsoff, Kurt McKenzie, Marcus Higgins, and Rob Hilliard win their junior high basketball championship and celebrate at a lake house with their coach Robert "Buzzer" Ferdinando. Thirty years later, in 2008, Lenny is a wealthy and successful Hollywood talent agent, married to fashion designer Roxanne, and has three children: Greg, Keith, and Becky; Eric claims to co-own a lawn furniture company and has two children: Donna and Bean, with his wife Sally still breastfeeding the latter; Kurt is a stay-at-home father and has two children: Andre and Charlotte; his wife, Deanne, is pregnant with their third child, and her mother Ronzoni lives with them; Marcus is a slacker and lothario; and Rob is married to his much older fourth wife, Gloria, having had a daughter with each of his previous wives.

When Buzzer dies, the five friends reunite for his funeral in their hometown with their families. Lenny rents a lake house in the same town for everyone to stay over during the Fourth of July weekend, though his family is leaving early to attend Roxanne's fashion show in Milan. He pushes his boys to play outside and runs into his childhood opponent Dickie, who claims Lenny's foot was out of bounds when he made the winning shot and has been obsessed with getting a rematch to rectify the perceived 'mistake'.

As the friends spread Buzzer's ashes, Rob breaks down over his failed marriages and reveals that he has invited his estranged daughters Jasmine, Amber, and Bridget to visit. The men then play "arrow roulette", shooting an arrow straight into the air, and it ends up striking Rob in his foot, causing him to snap at Gloria for suggesting a holistic healing method for his injury. The next day, Lenny is thrilled to find the kids playing with cup-and-string telephones, but Roxanne, realizing the positive impact the weekend is having on their children, tells him to cancel their Milan trip and decide to stay at the lake instead.

Everyone visits Water Wizz, where Marcus flirts with Jasmine and Amber after buying them skimpy bikinis, and Eric teaches Bean to drink cow's milk. The families cause chaos throughout the park: the wives attract a bodybuilder and jeer at his high-pitched Canadian accent; Rob assaults a slide attendant when he insults Bridget, and Eric ignores Donna's warning about a chemical in the pool that turns urine blue. At the zipline attraction, Lenny's group meets up with Dickie, accompanied by his son, his former teammates, and his friend Wiley, who is then severely injured after crashing into a shed while sliding down the zipline using his feet.

The next day, Rob attacks Marcus, mistakenly believing that he slept with Jasmine, and Marcus admits to feeling insecure compared to his friends. Everyone tells the truth about the state of their lives: Roxanne confronts Lenny for canceling their flight to Milan before they left home, and he explains he wanted their family to have a normal vacation and to rein in his children's disrespectful attitudes; Deanne confronts Kurt for spending time with the Feders' nanny Rita, but Kurt retaliates by pointing out how she underappreciates him; Eric reveals that he was laid off from his job and was showing off the whole time to avoid humiliation; and Rob admits that everyone knows that he wears a toupee. Gloria helps everyone reconcile, and Lenny and Kurt offer to help Eric start a new business.

On their last day at the lake house, Lenny and his friends agree to do a rematch of basketball against Dickie, Robideaux, Muzby, Tardio, and Malcolm. The game culminates in Lenny and Greg facing Dickie and his son, but Lenny misses the game-deciding shot. As the families watch the Fourth of July fireworks, Lenny tells Roxanne that he deliberately let Dickie's family win to get him off his case and felt that his own family needed to know what losing feels like. Meanwhile, Marcus plays another game of arrow roulette, which causes everyone to run away, with Wiley, now wearing a full-body cast from the pool incident, getting his foot struck by the arrow.

== Cast ==
- Adam Sandler as Lenny Feder, a Hollywood talent agent
  - Michael Cavaleri as Young Lenny
- Kevin James as Eric Lamonsoff, a friend of Lenny and a former worker at Branchville Lawn Furniture
  - Andrew Bayard as Young Eric
- Chris Rock as Kurt McKenzie, a friend of Lenny
  - Jameel McGill as Young Kurt
- David Spade as Marcus Higgins, a friend of Lenny
  - Kyle Brooks as Young Marcus
- Rob Schneider as Rob Hilliard, a hippie friend of Lenny
  - Joshua Matz as Young Rob
- Salma Hayek (Note: Salma Hayek was credited as Salma Hayek Pinault in the end credits.) as Roxanne Chase-Feder, a fashion designer and Lenny's wife
- Maria Bello as Sally Lamonsoff, Eric's wife
- Maya Rudolph as Deanne McKenzie, Kurt's wife
- Joyce Van Patten as Gloria Noonan, Rob's elderly fourth wife
- Colin Quinn as Dickie Bailey, a restaurant chef at "Woodman's Eat in the Rough" and Lenny's childhood rival
  - Hunter Silva as Young Dickie
- Steve Buscemi as Wiley, one of Dickie's friends
- Tim Meadows as Malcolm, one of Dickie's friends and former teammates
  - Christopher Borger as Young Malcolm
- Jonathan Loughran as Robideaux, Dickie's friend and former teammate
  - Connor Panzner as Young Robideaux
- Kevin Grady as Muzby, Dickie's friend and former teammate
  - Jeremy Weaver as Young Muzby
- Richie Minervini as Tardio, Dickie's friend and former teammate
  - Daniel Cohen as Young Tardio
- Rob's daughters, all half-sisters:
  - Madison Riley as Jasmine Hilliard, from his first marriage
  - Jamie Chung as Amber Hilliard, from his second marriage
  - Ashley Loren as Bridget Hilliard, from his third marriage
- Lenny and Roxanne's children:
  - Jake Goldberg as Greg Feder, their 13-year-old son
  - Cameron Boyce as Keithie Feder, their 11-year-old son
  - Alexys Nycole Sanchez as Becky Feder, their 5-year-old daughter and youngest child
- Eric and Sally's children:
  - Ada-Nicole Sanger as Donna Lamonsoff, their 11-year-old daughter
  - Frank and Morgan Gingerich as Bean Lamonsoff, their 4-year-old son
- Kurt and Deanne's children:
  - Nadji Jeter as Andre McKenzie, their 13-year-old son
  - China Anne McClain as Charlotte McKenzie, their 11-year-old daughter
- Ebony Jo-Ann as Mama Ronzoni, Deanne's mother; Kurt's mother-in-law
- Di Quon as Rita, a maid/nanny for the Feders
- Dan Patrick as Norby the Ride Guy
- Blake Clark as Coach Robert "Buzzer" Ferdinando
- Norm MacDonald as Geezer. MacDonald filmed several scenes but was reduced to a cameo.
- Tim Herlihy as Pastor
- Alec Musser as Water Park Stud
Director Dennis Dugan appears as a referee, while Sandler's wife, Jackie, and children, Sunny and Sadie, appear as Tardio's family.

== Production ==
Adam Sandler, Chris Rock, Rob Schneider, and David Spade met when they all joined the cast of Saturday Night Live in the 1990–1991 season; supporting cast members Colin Quinn, Maya Rudolph, Tim Meadows, and Norm Macdonald have also been SNL cast members.

Filming commenced in Essex County, Massachusetts, in August 2009. Chebacco Lake was used to portray the fictional Amoskeag Lake where the Earnshaw family's lake house setting was. Woodman's of Essex was used for the restaurant "Woodman's Eat in the Rough". Water Wizz was used as the filming location for the water park scene.

== Release ==
=== Box office ===
Grown Ups grossed $162 million in the United States and $110.2 million in other territories for a worldwide gross of $272.2 million against a production budget of $75 million. Grown Ups surpassed Click to become Adam Sandler's highest-grossing film worldwide. Happy with the gross, Sandler showed his appreciation by buying brand-new Maserati sports cars for his four co-stars.

=== Critical response ===
On Rotten Tomatoes, Grown Ups has an approval percentage of 10% based on 166 reviews and an average rating of 3.40/10. The critics consensus reads: "Grown Ups' cast of comedy vets is amiable, but they're let down by flat direction and the scattershot, lowbrow humor of a stunted script." On Metacritic, the film has a score of 30 out of 100 based on 32 critic reviews, meaning "generally unfavorable". Audiences polled by CinemaScore gave the film an average grade of "B" on an A+ to F scale.

Connie Ogle of the Miami Herald referred to it as "the perfect poster child for this maddening summer of movie mediocrity." Rick Groen of The Globe and Mail criticized what he saw as blatant commercialism, saying the cast "lob[bed] gags they surely disdain at an audience they probably despise while reserving their own laughter for that off-camera dash all the way to the bank." Richard Roeper went as far as to say that it was "a blight upon the bright canvas of American cinema", and that he hated it. Tom Long of The Detroit News called it "trite comedy" and "total garbage." On the other end of the spectrum, Lisa Kennedy of The Denver Post called it "crude and decent-hearted" and "easy, breezy, predictable."

=== Awards ===
Rob Schneider was nominated for a Razzie Award for Worst Supporting Actor for the film, but he lost to Jackson Rathbone for both The Last Airbender and The Twilight Saga: Eclipse.

The film won at the 2011 MTV Movie Awards for the "Best Line from a Movie" category, which it won for the line "I want to get chocolate wasted!", delivered by Becky, played by Alexys Nycole Sanchez.

=== Home media ===
Grown Ups was released on DVD and Blu-ray Disc on November 9, 2010, by Sony Pictures Home Entertainment.

== Music ==
Grown Ups (Original Motion Picture Soundtrack)

Soundtrack album by Various
- Released: June 22, 2010
- Genre: Album-oriented rock
- Length: 59:36
- Label: Madison Gate Records
- Producer: Adam Sandler (exec.)

No.	Title	Artist	Length
1.	"Come Back"	The J. Geils Band	5:12
2.	"A Life of Illusion"	Joe Walsh	3:31
3.	"Lay It On the Line"	Triumph	4:04
4.	"When Things Go Wrong"	Robin Lane and the Chartbusters	3:16
5.	"A Night Like This"	The Romantics	5:08
6.	"Time for Me to Fly"	REO Speedwagon	3:39
7.	"Just Can't Wait"	The J. Geils Band	3:25
8.	"Come and Get Your Love"	Redbone	4:58
9.	"Goodnight Tonight"	Wings	4:20
10.	"Just Got Back"	Cheap Trick	2:02
11.	"The Party's Over (Hopelessly in Love)"	Journey	3:43
12.	"Sentimental Lady"	Bob Welch	2:59
13.	"Two Tickets to Paradise"	Eddie Money	3:58
14.	"I Do"	The J. Geils Band	3:07
15.	"Better Things"	The Kinks	2:59
16.	"Count On Me"	Jefferson Starship	3:15
Total length:			59:36

Songs not featured in the soundtrack album:

- "Devil Woman" - Cliff Richard
- "Raga for a Whale" - Kamal Engels
- "I'm a Gangsta" - Global Operator ft. Mike West
- "Ave Maria" - Sung by Rob Schneider (originally by Franz Schubert)
- "Last Child" - Aerosmith
- "Love Is Alive" - Gary Wright
- "I Could Be Good for You" - 707
- "Rock and Roll Never Forgets" - Bob Seger (also in the film's trailer)
- "Escape (The Piña Colada Song)" - Rupert Holmes
- "Walk All Over You" - AC/DC
- "Ready for Love" - Bad Company
- "Monday Morning" - Fleetwood Mac
- "Every 1's a Winner" - Hot Chocolate
- "Stan the Man" - Adam Sandler

Songs that appeared in the trailer:

- "All Night Long" - Joe Walsh
- "All Over the World" - Electric Light Orchestra

== Sequels ==
=== Grown Ups 2 ===
A sequel, titled Grown Ups 2, was released on July 12, 2013. Dennis Dugan, the director of the first film, returned as director. The main cast, including Adam Sandler, Kevin James, Chris Rock, David Spade, Salma Hayek, Maya Rudolph, Maria Bello and Steve Buscemi reprised their roles, except Rob Schneider. New cast includes Andy Samberg, Taylor Lautner and Patrick Schwarzenegger. The sequel follows Lenny Feder as he relocates his family back to the small town where he and his friends grew up. Like its predecessor, Grown Ups 2 received very poor reviews, but it was still a box office hit.

=== Grown Ups 3 ===
In May 2026, a third film was announced for Netflix with Kyle Newacheck directing.

Maria Bello said in an August 2016 interview, "People have talked about it and we've heard it might happen, but I don't know if there is a script, I don't know what there is. But I hope so because, boy, it's fun to work with those guys." In January 2020, comedian Tom Scharpling gained attention for uploading an unofficial and unaffiliated Grown Ups 3 script, written in April 2019, to Twitter. In July 2025, while promoting his film Happy Gilmore 2, Sandler hinted a sequel was possible once a story had been greenlit. Rob Schneider expressed support in a sequel following his absence in the second film. In May 2026, a sequel was announced for Netflix with Kyle Newacheck directing.
