= Tim Meadows =

American actor and comedian (born 1961)

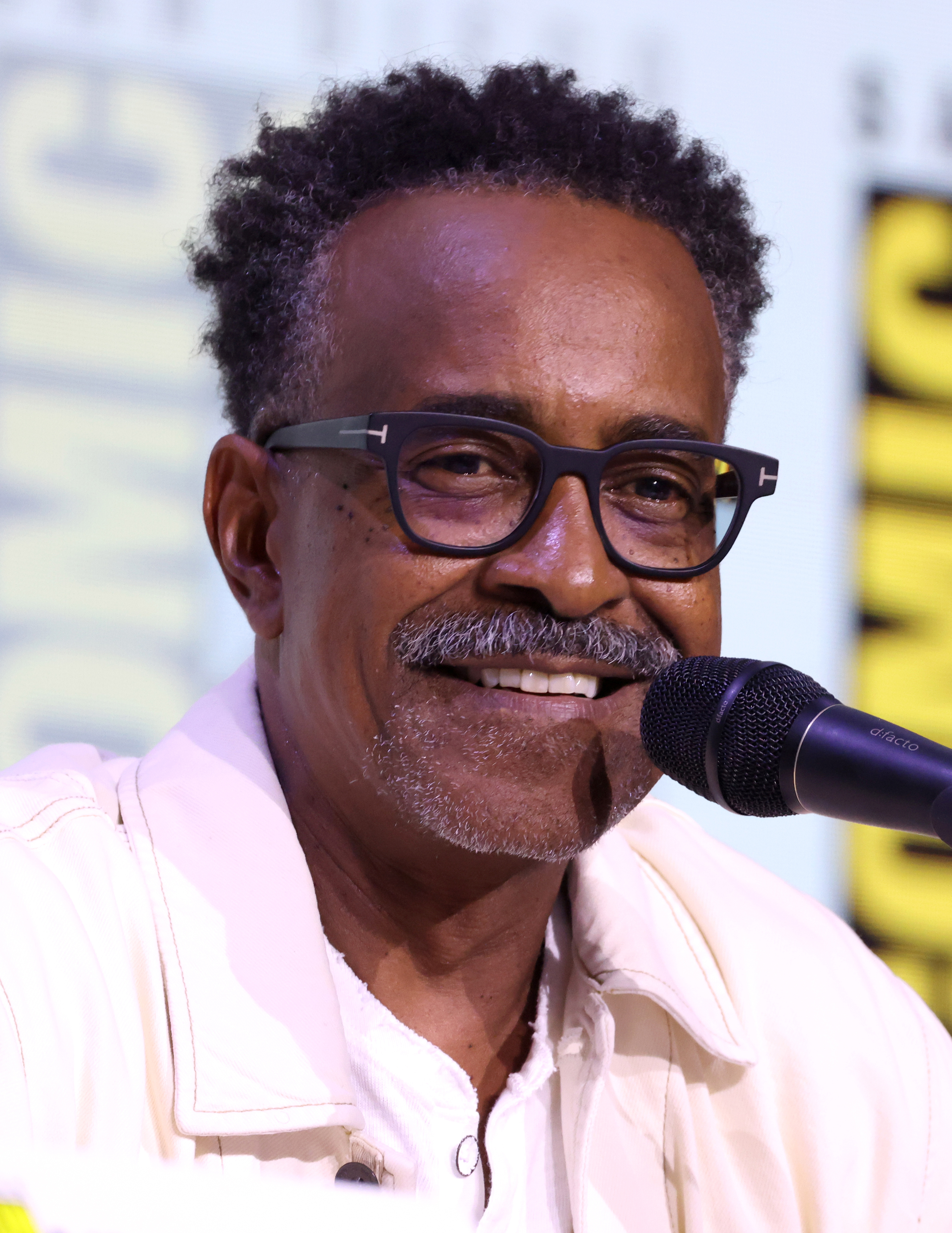
- Meadows in 2025
- Born: February 5, 1961 (age 65); Highland Park, Michigan, U.S.
- Occupations: Actor; comedian
- Years active: 1985–present
- Spouse: Michelle Taylor (m. 1997; div. 2005)
- Children: 2
- Website: timmeadowslive.com

Tim Meadows (born February 5, 1961) is an American actor and comedian. He was one of the longest-running cast members on the NBC sketch comedy series Saturday Night Live, where he appeared for 10 seasons from 1991 to 2000. For his work on SNL, he received a nomination for the Primetime Emmy Award for Outstanding Writing for a Variety Series in 1993. He played main character John Glascott on the ABC sitcom Schooled for its two-season run after playing the same character in a recurring role for six seasons on The Goldbergs. Meadows is also known for his role as Principal Duvall in the 2004 teen comedy film Mean Girls, a role he then reprised in Mean Girls 2 and in the film's 2024 musical adaptation.

== Early life ==
Meadows was born in the Detroit enclave of Highland Park, Michigan, the son of Mardell, a nurse's assistant, and Lathon Meadows, a janitor. He attended Wayne State University before leaving to begin his comedy career; the university awarded him an honorary doctorate in 2022.

== Career ==
Meadows began performing improvisational comedy at the Soup Kitchen Saloon in Detroit. Meadows's start in show business was in Chicago as a member of The Second City comedy troupe, alongside Chris Farley. In Fall 1990, Saturday Night Live producer Lorne Michaels saw Meadows perform at Second City, and brought him into a meeting in New York, without auditioning for the show, where he read a line for a sketch with Steve Martin, Paul Simon, and Ralph Nader, which was for the first Five-Timers Club sketch for the Tom Hanks episode on December 8, 1990, in which Meadows did not appear at all.

Meadows would instead officially land a spot on SNL two months later in February 1991, and went on to become a longtime cast member, appearing on the program until 2000. (Meadows was on the show for 10 seasons; this was the record for the longest tenure on the show until it was surpassed by Darrell Hammond in 2005, whose record was also surpassed by Kenan Thompson in 2017.) Meadows's lengthy tenure on the show was used as a gag in four monologues when former cast members Phil Hartman, Mike Myers and Farley returned to the show to host, and when Alec Baldwin hosted for his 12th time.

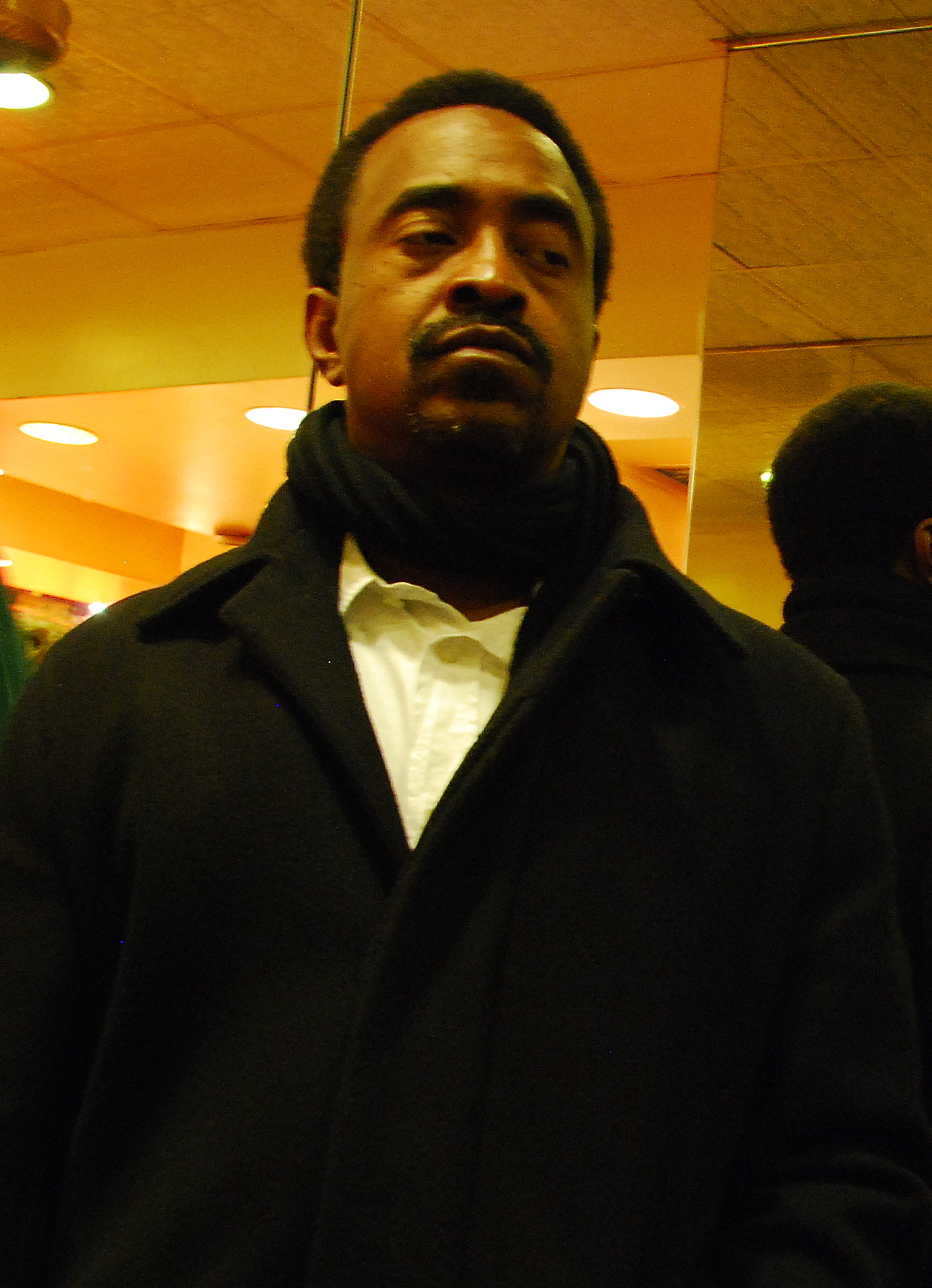
Meadows in 2008

During his time on SNL, Meadows often spoofed famous personalities, including Oprah Winfrey, Erykah Badu, Michael Jackson, and Tiger Woods, and one time was a quick-change artist to pull off an impersonation of both O. J. Simpson and Al Cowlings within the timespan of one SNL skit. Some skits had Meadows playing a fictionalized version of himself, such as being a fan of ice hockey on Weekend Update, stating his dissatisfaction with the 1994 NHL lockout and remarking, "What am I supposed to do about this; watch basketball?" Another sketch as himself was introducing the entire SNL cast as their most famous characters, such as Wayne and Garth or Melanie Hutsell as Jan Brady, in a sing-along denouncing the 1992 Los Angeles riots, which ends with Meadows remarking, "This is personal to me...mainly because I don't have an SNL character to play!" Eventually, he did get an original character with Leon Phelps, "The Ladies' Man", a perpetually horny talk-show host who falsely believed himself to be the living definition of what women search for in a man. The character was adapted into a 2000 film, The Ladies' Man, which followed the character's attempts to find love and a suitable outlet for his beloved radio program. In 2001, he co-starred in Three Days; in 2003, he appeared as Miles McDermott in The Even Stevens Movie.

Meadows soon moved on to other projects, including a regular role on the short-lived NBC sitcom The Michael Richards Show and a supporting role in the 2004 film The Cookout. He also guest-starred as a client on the hit NBC comedy The Office in the second-season episode "The Client". He played a high-school principal in Mean Girls, a film written by (and co-starring) fellow SNL cast member Tina Fey. He also had a part in Handsome Boy Modeling School's album White People. In 2007, he appeared in a substantial supporting role in Walk Hard: The Dewey Cox Story.

Meadows has appeared in other feature films, including Coneheads, It's Pat, and Wayne's World 2, all of which were based on popular SNL characters and had varying degrees of success. He co-starred in the 2006 film The Benchwarmers alongside his former SNL co-stars Rob Schneider and David Spade. He was also featured in CBS's Gameshow Marathon (summer 2006), has appeared on The Colbert Report in the recurring role of P.K. Winsome, a conservative pundit and entrepreneur (who made an appearance at the Rally to Restore Sanity and/or Fear), and starred in The Bill Engvall Show and Curb Your Enthusiasm. He was also a frequent guest on The Late Late Show with Craig Ferguson as a comic field reporter. On May 31, 2008, Meadows threw out a ceremonial first pitch and conducted the seventh-inning stretch at Wrigley Field during a Chicago Cubs game against the Colorado Rockies.

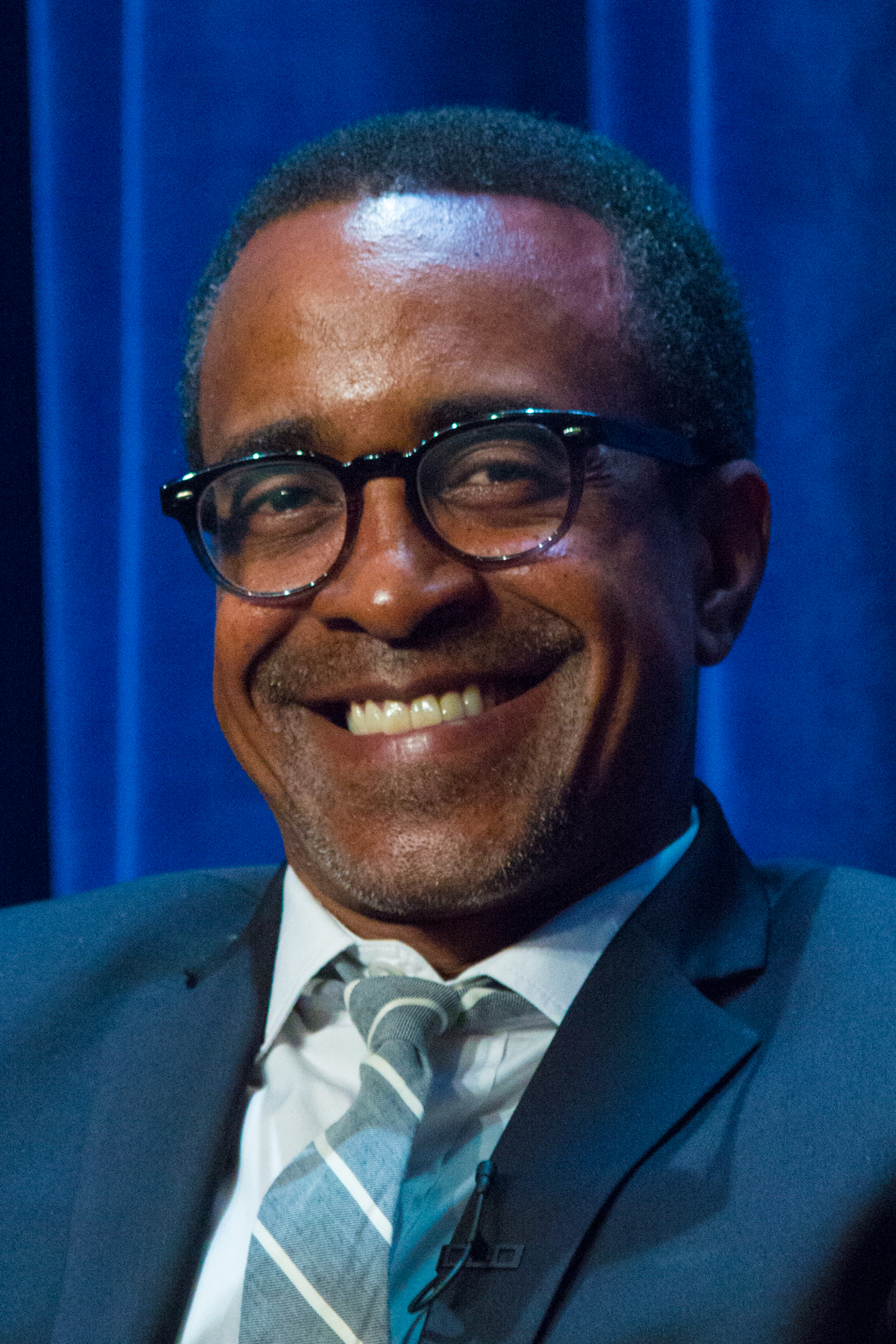
Meadows at the PaleyFest Fall TV Previews 2014 for Marry Me

In 2014, Meadows co-starred alongside Casey Wilson and Ken Marino in the short-lived NBC sitcom Marry Me. Dan Bucatinsky and he played "the Kevins", the gay dads of Annie (played by Wilson), who are both named Kevin. Since 2013, he has appeared in a recurring role on the ABC sitcom The Goldbergs, playing Mr. Glascott, the high school's parrot-owning guidance counselor. In 2016, he began starring in the FOX live-action/animation hybrid Son of Zorn opposite Cheryl Hines and Jason Sudeikis. He also had a recurring role in Brooklyn Nine-Nine as Jake Peralta's cannibal prison cellmate.

Meadows is featured in season two of Space Force starring Steve Carell.

Meadows continues to perform improv in Chicago and Los Angeles, most frequently at venues such as the ImprovOlympic and Upright Citizens Brigade Theatre. With Heather Anne Campbell and Miles Stroth, Meadows frequently performed in the improvised sketch show, Heather, Miles, and Tim in Los Angeles.

On February 17, 2023, Meadows was announced to reprise his role as Principal Ron Duvall from the first Mean Girls film in the stage-to-screen adaptation of the Broadway musical.

== Personal life ==
Meadows married Michelle Taylor in 1997. They had two sons together. They divorced in 2005.

== Filmography ==
=== Film ===
Year	Title	Role	Notes
1993	Coneheads	Athletic Cone	
1993	Wayne's World 2	Sammy Davis Jr.	
1994	It's Pat	KVIB-FM Station Manager	
2000	The Ladies Man	Leon Phelps	Also writer
2003	Wasabi Tuna	Dave	
2004	Mean Girls	Ron Duvall	
2004	The Cookout	Cousin Leroy	
2006	The Benchwarmers	Wayne	
2007	Walk Hard: The Dewey Cox Story	Sam McPherson	
2008	Semi-Pro	Cornelius Banks	
2009	Aliens in the Attic	Sheriff Doug Armstrong	
2010	Grown Ups	Malcolm	
2011	Jack & Jill	Ted	
2013	Grown Ups 2	Malcolm	
2015	Chasing Ghosts	Chris Brighton	
2015	Trainwreck	Tim	
2016	Popstar: Never Stop Never Stopping	Harry Duggins	
2020	Hubie Halloween	Mr. Lester Hennessey	
2022	It's a Wonderful Binge	Keegan	
2023	Dream Scenario	Brett	
2024	Mean Girls	Ron Duvall	
2024	Our Little Secret	Stan	
2024	Golden	—N/a	Unreleased
TBA	Saurus City †	Filbin Nutwagon	Voice; post-production
TBA	The Chaperones †		Post-production
TBA	Grown Ups 3 †		Filming

=== Television ===
Year	Title	Role	Notes
1991–2000	Saturday Night Live	Various characters	Also writer, series regular; 184 episodes
1997	The Chris Rock Show	Rev. Barnett Reed	Episode #2.1; uncredited
1999	Strangers with Candy	Percy Kittens	Episode: "Let Freedom Ring"
1999	Olive, the Other Reindeer	Richard Stands (voice)	TV movie
2000	The Michael Richards Show	Kevin Blakeley	Series regular; 7 episodes
2000–2001	TV Funhouse	Various voices	2 episodes
2001	Third Watch	Leroy Watkins	Episode: "Exposing Faith"
2001	Three Days	Lionel the Angel	TV movie
2002	Leap of Faith	Lucas	6 episodes
2003	The Even Stevens Movie	Miles McDermott	TV movie
2004	One on One	Leroy Ballard	Episode: "You Don't Have to Go Home..."
2005	Living with Fran	Greg Peters	3 episodes
2005	The Office	Christian	Episode: "The Client"
2006	Everybody Hates Chris	Soul Train Teacher	Episode: "Everybody Hates Corleone"
2006	Lovespring International	Joe Reynolds	Episode: "The Sperminator"
2006	Reba	Steve Norris	Episode: "Just Business"
2006	Help Me Help You	Dr. Pete "Petey" Spiller	3 episodes
2006–2014	The Colbert Report	P.K. Winsome	Recurring; 11 episodes
2007	According to Jim	Dennis	Episode: "Hoosier Daddy"
2007	Shredderman Rules	Mr. Green	TV movie
2007	Curb Your Enthusiasm	Hal	Episode: "The Rat Dog"
2007–2008	Lil' Bush	Lil' Barack (voice)	11 episodes
2007–2009	The Bill Engvall Show	Paul DuFrayne	Series regular; 23 episodes
2009–2012	Easy to Assemble	Tim	5 episodes
2010	Funny or Die Presents	Skip Spence Raylon	Episode: "The Carpet Brothers"
2010	The New Adventures of Old Christine	Dr. Volk	2 episodes
2010–2011	Glory Daze	Professor Haines	Series regular; 8 episodes
2011	Mean Girls 2	Ron Duvall	Television film
2011–2012	The Life & Times of Tim	Various voices	2 episodes
2012–2014	Suburgatory	Edmond	3 episodes
2012–2015	Mr. Box Office	Principal Theodore Martin	Series regular; 36 episodes
2012–present	Bob's Burgers	Mike the Mailman / Leaser (voice)	22 episodes
2013	30 Rock	Martin Lutherking	Episode: "Florida"
2013	The Venture Bros.	Wind Song (voice)	Episode: "Sphinx Rising"
2013	Comedy Bang! Bang!	J. Milo Beauregard	Episode: "David Cross Wears a Red Polo Shirt & Brown Shoes with Red Laces"
2013–2023	The Goldbergs	Jonathan "Andre" Glascott	Recurring; 46 episodes
2014–2015	Marry Me	Kevin 1	Series regular; 14 episodes
2015	The Spoils Before Dying	Gary Dunhill	4 episodes
2016	Ask the StoryBots	Reindeer	Episode: "Where Does Rain Come From?"
2016	Tween Fest	Hologram Miles Davis	Episode: "Vape Battle of the Century"
2016–2026	The Late Show with Stephen Colbert	P.K. Winsome / Innocent Man / Himself	7 episodes, including the series finale
2016–2017	Son of Zorn	Craig	Series regular; 13 episodes
2016–2022	Inside Amy Schumer	Various	4 episodes
2017–2018	Man with a Plan	Rudy	4 episodes
2017–2019	Funny You Should Ask	Himself	27 episodes
2017–2021	Brooklyn Nine-Nine	Caleb John Gosche	4 episodes
2017–2021	No Activity	Det. Judd Tolbeck	20 episodes
2018	Great News	Lawyer	Episode: "The Fast Track"
2018	Detroiters	Walt Worsch	Episode: "April in the D"
2018	All About the Washingtons	Himself	Episode: "Sip Stop Hooray"
2018	Rob Riggle's Ski Master Academy	Lake Commissioner	4 episodes
2018	Animals	Orville (voice)	Episode: "Horses"
2019	BoJack Horseman	Jameson's Dad (voice)	Episode: "A Horse Walks into a Rehab"
2019–2020	Schooled	Principal Jonathan "Andre" Glascott	Main role; spin-off of The Goldbergs
2019–2021	Miracle Workers	Dave Shelby / Jedidiah	2 episodes
2020	Mapleworth Murders	Andy Hapsburg	2 episodes
2021	Bless the Harts	(voice)	Episode: "When You Lose, You Win"
2021	Santa Inc.	Brent (voice)	3 episodes
2022	Space Force	Secretary of Defense	4 episodes
2022	Last Week Tonight with John Oliver	Officer Bruce	Episode: "Police Interrogations"
2022	Girls5eva	Himself	Episode: "Album Mode"
2022	That Damn Michael Che	Teacher	Episode: "Your Past, Your Present"
2022	Central Park	(voice)	2 episodes
2022	Chicago Party Aunt	Samuel (voice)	2 episodes
2023	Poker Face	Michael Graves	Episode: "Exit Stage Death"
2023	The Mandalorian	Colonel Tuttle	Episode: "Chapter 21: The Pirate"
2023	I Think You Should Leave with Tim Robinson	Dad	Episode: "Don't Just Say 'Relax,' Actually Relax"
2023	Beavis and Butt-Head	Cody's Dad (voice)	Episode: "Sleepover"
2023	My Dad the Bounty Hunter	Principal Lieb (voice)	Episode: "Abduction"
2023	Big City Greens	Chet Handsomeman	Episode: "Iced/Chipped Out"
2023–present	Digman!	Quail Eegan (voice)	Main cast
2024	Life & Beth	Therapist	Episode: "This Soup Is Gonna Be Good"
2024	Grimsburg	(voice)	Episode: "Murder on the Splurt Express"
2024–2025	Krapopolis	Gregorios (voice)	2 episodes
2025	The Simpsons	Himself (voice)	Episode: "P.S. I Hate You"
2025	Peacemaker	Langston Fleury	Recurring; Season 2
2025–2026	DMV	Gregg	Main cast
2026	Universal Basic Guys	George (voice)	Episode: "Go Fund Mernft"

=== Theatre ===
Year	Production	Role	Venue	Notes
2025	All In: Comedy About Love	Performer	Hudson Theatre	February 4–16, 2025

=== Web ===
Year	Title	Role	Notes
2019	Ryan Hansen Solves Crimes on Television	Adam	3 episodes
