= Water Wizz =

Water park located on Cape Cod, MA

- Interactive map of Water Wizz
- Slogan: Cape Cod’s Only Waterpark
- Location: 3031 Cranberry Highway, East Wareham, Massachusetts, U.S.
- Coordinates: 41°45′24.60″N 70°39′34.17″W
- Owner: WW Cranberry Highway Inc.
- Opened: 1982
- Area: 8 acres (3.2 ha)
- Website: www.waterwizz.com

Water Wizz, touted as "Cape Cod's only water park", is a family-owned water park located in East Wareham, Massachusetts, and attracting about 100,000 visitors yearly. This park is not to be confused with the former Water Wizz in Westerly, Rhode Island, which was separately owned and was closed in 2019.

== History ==
The park opened in 1982, with three serpentine slides and two speed slides. The serpentine slides are Hurricane Floyd, Hurricane Bob, and Hurricane Carol, and the speed slides are Hurricane Andrew and Hurricane Hugo. The five slides make up Hurricane Hill. In 1984, the park added bumper boats and an 18-hole mini-golf course which were later razed. Cartland of Cape Cod now holds the mini golf course and bumper boats at their location right down the road from Water Wizz.

In 1989, the park added its first tube ride, The Canal, and a lazy river, Herring Run River. In 1993, a lily pad walk and kiddie pool was added, named Harpoon Lagoon, and speed slide Pirates Plunge, later renamed to Pipeline Plunge was added as well. Devils Peak, later renamed to Squid Row was added in 1995, which are two speed slides that use a tube. The Mussel Beach Wave Pool was added in 2000, and Captain Kids Island was added in 2008. In 2013, three tube slides, named Thunder Falls after the park they came from, were relocated to Water Wizz. The other slides are two speed slides that are 61 feet tall, named Devils Peak. The slides took the name from two other slides at Water Wizz, which are now renamed to Squid Row. In 2019, one of the park's managers announced plans to expand.

== Popular culture ==
Water Wizz was used as a location for two consecutive scenes in the 2010 film Grown Ups. The park also appeared by name and playing a larger part in the 2013 film The Way, Way Back.
