= Grown Ups 3 =

Upcoming American comedy film

- Directed by: Kyle Newacheck
- Written by: Adam Sandler; Tim Herlihy
- Based on: Grown Ups by Adam Sandler; Fred Wolf
- Produced by: Adam Sandler; Jackie Sandler; Jack Giarraputo; Tim Herlihy
- Starring: Adam Sandler; Kevin James; Chris Rock; David Spade; Rob Schneider; Maya Rudolph; Maria Bello; Salma Hayek; Bailee Madison; Julie Bowen; Deon Cole
- Cinematography: Maria Rusche
- Production companies: Sony Pictures; Happy Madison Productions
- Distributed by: Netflix
- Country: United States
- Language: English

Grown Ups 3 is an upcoming American comedy film starring Adam Sandler, Kevin James, Chris Rock, David Spade and Rob Schneider. The sequel to Grown Ups (2010) and Grown Ups 2 (2013), it will be directed by Kyle Newacheck and will be written by Sandler and Tim Herlihy. Several cast members are set to reprise their roles from the previous films, including Maya Rudolph, Maria Bello and Salma Hayek, with Bailee Madison, Julie Bowen, and Deon Cole joining the cast in new roles.

Grown Ups 3 is being produced by Sandler's production company Happy Madison Productions in partnership with Sony Pictures and will be distributed by Netflix.

== Premise ==
"Now that their kids are all grown up, the gang is finally free to go on the ultimate adventure."

== Cast ==
- Adam Sandler as Lenny Feder, a Hollywood talent agent.
- Kevin James as Eric Lamonsoff, a friend of Lenny who used to work at a furniture store and now runs Lamonsoff Auto Repair.
- Chris Rock as Kurt McKenzie, a friend of Lenny who works as a cableman.
- David Spade as Marcus Higgins, a friend of Lenny who is a slacker and a lothario.
- Rob Schneider as Rob Hilliard, a hippie friend of Lenny
- Maya Rudolph as Deanne McKenzie, Kurt's wife.
- Maria Bello as Sally Lamonsoff, Eric's wife.
- Salma Hayek as Roxanne Chase-Feder, a fashion designer who is Lenny's wife.
- Bailee Madison
- Julie Bowen
- Deon Cole
- Jackie Sandler as Jackie Tardio
- Steve Buscemi as Wiley
- Shaquille O'Neal as Officer Fluzoo, a police officer who is the big but younger brother of Malcolm.
- Colin Quinn as Dickie Bailey, an old rival of Lenny.
- Tim Meadows as Malcolm Fluzoo, one of Dickie's friends and an old rival of Kurt.
- Cheri Oteri as Penny, Wiley's wife who obsesses over Lenny ever since they briefly dated in the 6th grade.
- Ellen Cleghorne as Mary Fluzoo, the wife of Malcolm.
- Nick Swardson as Nick Hilliard, Rob's estranged brother.
- Jake Goldberg as Greg Feder, Lenny and Roxanne's eldest son.
- Alexys Nycole Sanchez as Becky Feder, Lenny and Roxanne's daughter.
- Sadie Sandler as Sadie Tardio
- Sunny Sandler as Sunny Tardio
- Ada-Nicole Sanger as Donna Lamonsoff, Eric and Sally's daughter.
- Morgan Gingerich as Bean Lamonsoff, Eric and Sally's son.
- Nadji Jeter as Andre McKenzie, Kurt and Deanne's eldest son.
- Kaleo Elam as Ronnie McKenzie, Kurt and Deanne's youngest son.
- David Mattle
- Kamil McFadden as Bumpty Fluzoo, Malcolm and Mary's son.
- Jamie Chung as Amber Hilliard, Rob's daughter from his second marriage

== Production ==
Maria Bello said in an August 2016 interview, "People have talked about it and we've heard it might happen, but I don't know if there is a script, I don't know what there is. But I hope so because, boy, it's fun to work with those guys." In January 2020, comedian Tom Scharpling gained attention for uploading an unofficial and unaffiliated Grown Ups 3 script, written in April 2019, to Twitter. In July 2025 while promoting his film Happy Gilmore 2, Sandler hinted a sequel is possible once a story has been greenlit. Rob Schneider expressed support in a sequel following his absence in the second film.

In May 2026, it was announced that a sequel was in development at Netflix, with Kyle Newacheck directing, with Sandler and Tim Herlihy writing the script. Sandler reprises his role, alongside David Spade, Schneider, Chris Rock, and Kevin James. Salma Hayek had signed on to reprise her role as Roxanne Chase-Feder by August, with Maya Rudolph and Bello also reprising their roles, along with Bailee Madison, Julie Bowen, and Deon Cole also joining. In August 2026, Sandler's youngest daughter Sunny while promoting her film Don't Say Good Luck on The Tonight Show Starring Jimmy Fallon, revealed that principal photography would begin in August 2026. On August 6, Schneider posted on Instagram confirming Jackie Sandler, Shaquille O'Neal, Colin Quinn, Tim Meadows, Cheri Oteri, Ellen Cleghorne, Nick Swardson, Jake Goldberg, Alexys Nycole Sanchez, Ada-Nicole Sanger, Morgan Gingerich, Nadji Jeter, Kaleo Elam, and Kamil McFadden will be reprising their roles from the previous films while David Mattle joins the cast.

=== Filming ===
Principal photography began on August 4, 2026, in Morristown, New Jersey, and the Keansburg Boardwalk (amusement park) in Keansburg, New Jersey, and wrapped on October 14. Principal soundstages were located at Mile End Studios in Kearny Point, Kearny, New Jersey.

== See also ==
- Happy Gilmore 2 (2025) – directed by Newacheck, written and produced by Sandler and Herlihy, filmed in New Jersey and released onto Netflix.
