= Love, Weddings & Other Disasters =

2020 film comedy by Dennis Dugan

- Official poster
- Directed by: Dennis Dugan
- Screenplay by: Dennis Dugan
- Story by: Dennis Dugan; Eileen Conn; Larry Miller
- Produced by: Nadine de Barros; Martin Metz; Adrian Politowski; Michael Rachmil; Dan Reardon
- Starring: Diane Keaton; Jeremy Irons; Maggie Grace; Diego Boneta; Andrew Bachelor
- Cinematography: Nick Remy Matthews
- Edited by: Julie Garces
- Music by: Noah Needleman; Keaton Simons
- Production companies: Align Pictures; Fortitude International
- Distributed by: Saban Films
- Release date: December 4, 2020
- Running time: 96 minutes
- Country: United States
- Language: English
- Box office: $922,586

Love, Weddings & Other Disasters is a 2020 American romantic comedy film written and directed by Dennis Dugan, from a story by Dugan, Eileen Conn and Larry Miller. It stars Diane Keaton, Jeremy Irons, Maggie Grace, Diego Boneta and Andrew Bachelor.

It was released on December 4, 2020, by Saban Films and was a critical and commercial failure.

== Plot ==
Jessie, a florist, gets dumped mid-parachute jump, she ends up dropping her ex-boyfriend into a lake next to a wedding, which she ends up crashing into, unable to control her parachute. Jessie goes viral and is dubbed "the Wedding Trasher". Jessie is later unexpectedly hired to be a wedding planner by the modern fiancé Liz of Robert, a man who is running for mayor, and create a fun party atmosphere for the reception.

Bride Liz and groom Robert have conflicting ideas on the wedding-the bride wants a modern wedding with a band and a party, the groom wants a traditional wedding with a string quartet. The groom ends up hiring equally perfectionist and demanding wedding planner Lawrence Phillips, who Jessie crashed into with her electric scooter. The two wedding planners start to butt heads with their different views.

Lawrence Phillips, a perfectionist OCD planner, gets set up on an impromptu blind date with a woman who is actually blind. Lawrence is a widower who hasn't been on a date in 5 years and has become grumpy and bitter, unable to laugh. Sarah, the blind women, opens Lawrence to new things although he keeps messing up. He tries very hard, even putting a blindfold on to experience life as she does. Lawrence starts to become happy and even nice.

The groom's brother Jimmy is the polar opposite of his brother. Jimmy is a gambler and in a large amount of debt with some dangerous people. Jimmy goes on a TV show called Crash Couples to win money and ends up being chained together for 24 hours while being filmed with a stripper named Olga, who is also trying to win money to get away from her life. Robert supports his brother on the TV show and still wants him in the wedding, although he doesn't understand why he didn't tell him about the debt. Jimmy and Olga ending up winning the Crash Couple competition with some help from Olga's Mafia connections, who have become their business partners.

A local tour guide, Captain Ritchie, ends up on TV for his funny and original tours. Ritchie searches for his "Cinderella," a woman who had a tattoo of a glass slipper on her neck. Ritchie never saw her again after meeting her on a tour.

Robert's chief of staff doesn't agree with the wedding and wants a more traditional affair, something for Robert to go up in points in the press, even following Ritchie to meet his Cinderella on TV. Unfortunately, she doesn't show as he helped Robert get out of traffic and to his wedding. He is then invited to the wedding, where he bumps in to his Cinderella.

High school friends Mack and Lenny are in a band together, and start having tension with each other when Lenny gets a girlfriend named Yoni. Jessie tries to hire them and arm wrestles Mack to get them to play at Liz and Robert's wedding. Mack and Lenny end up agreeing to do the wedding. However, things go down hill when Lenny invites his girlfriend Yoni to play with the band and they secretly make a demo without telling Mack. The band breaks up, so Jessie asks the buskers in the park across the street to help. When Mack asks Jessie out, she says "no" at first, but they start to develop feelings for each other.

Throughout the whole movie, two buskers start gradually playing together.

== Cast ==
- Diane Keaton as Sara
- Jeremy Irons as Lawrence Phillips
- Diego Boneta as Mack
- JinJoo Lee as Yoni
- Jesse McCartney as Lenny
- Veronica Ferres as Bev
- Dennis Staroselsky as Robert Barton
- Todd Stashwick as Zhopa
- Maggie Grace as Jessie
- Caroline Portu as Liz Rafferty
- Melinda Hill as Svetlana
- Andrew Bachelor as Captain Ritchie
- William Xifaras as Menny
- Gail Bennington as Tina
- Elle King as Jordan
- Keaton Simons as Guitar Player
- Dennis Dugan as Eddie Stone

== Production ==
In August 2019, it was announced Diane Keaton, Jeremy Irons, Diego Boneta, JinJoo Lee, Jesse McCartney and Veronica Ferres had joined the cast of the film, with Dennis Dugan directing from a screenplay he wrote, alongside Eileen Conn and Larry Miller. In September 2019, Todd Stashwick, Dennis Staroselsky, Maggie Grace, Caroline Portu and Melinda Hill joined the cast of the film. In October 2019, Andrew Bachelor joined the cast of the film. Also joining were Elle King and Keaton Simons.

Principal photography began in September 2019. Filming took place in Boston, including in the Public Garden and various locations in South Boston.

== Release ==
In August 2020, Saban Films acquired distribution rights to the film and set its release in US theaters for December 4, 2020. The same day it was released on VOD by Lionsgate Home Entertainment.

== Reception ==
=== Box office ===
No information is available for how much Love, Weddings & Other Disasters grossed in the United States and Canada. The worldwide total was $922,586.

=== Critical response ===
The film was panned by critics. On review aggregator Rotten Tomatoes, the film holds a 3% approval rating based on 29 reviews, with an average rating of 2.8/10. The website's critics consensus reads: "A romantic comedy only in the loosest sense, Love, Weddings & Other Disasters offers a sobering reminder that even stars like Diane Keaton and Jeremy Irons occasionally do unpleasant things to pay the bills." On Metacritic, the film holds a rating of 11 out of 100, based on seven critics, indicating "overwhelming dislike".
