= Unidentified Flying Oddball =

1979 film by Russ Mayberry

- Theatrical release poster
- Directed by: Russ Mayberry
- Written by: Don Tait
- Based on: A Connecticut Yankee in King Arthur's Court; novel by Mark Twain
- Produced by: Ron Miller
- Starring: Dennis Dugan; Jim Dale; Ron Moody; Kenneth More; John Le Mesurier
- Cinematography: Paul Beeson
- Edited by: Peter Boita
- Music by: Ron Goodwin
- Production company: Walt Disney Productions
- Distributed by: Buena Vista Distribution
- Release dates: July 19, 1979 (London); August 3, 1979 (Los Angeles)
- Running time: 93 minutes
- Countries: United Kingdom; United States
- Language: English
- Budget: $5.25 million
- Box office: $4.475 million (US/Canada rentals)

Unidentified Flying Oddball is a 1979 science fiction comedy film. It was written by Don Tait (based loosely on Mark Twain's 1889 novel A Connecticut Yankee in King Arthur's Court) directed by Russ Mayberry, and produced by Walt Disney Productions. Released in the United Kingdom as The Spaceman and King Arthur, then subsequently re-released in the United States as A Spaceman in King Arthur's Court, the film stars Dennis Dugan as NASA employee Tom Trimble who unintentionally travels back in time with his look-alike android Hermes.

== Plot ==
After Trimble's NASA spacecraft travels faster than the speed of light, it takes him and his android back to King Arthur's Camelot in the year 508 AD. They then use their 20th-century technology to help defeat a plot by the evil Sir Mordred and Merlin to oust King Arthur from his throne.

== Cast ==
- Dennis Dugan as Tom Trimble/Hermes
- Jim Dale as Sir Mordred
- Ron Moody as Merlin
- Kenneth More as King Arthur
- John Le Mesurier as Sir Gawain
- Rodney Bewes as Clarence
- Sheila White as Alisande ("Sandy")
- Robert Beatty as Senator Milburn
- Cyril Shaps as Dr. Zimmerman
- Kevin Brennan as Winston
- Ewen Solon as Watkins
- Pat Roach as Oaf
- Reg Lye as Prisoner

== Production ==
The spacecraft featured in this movie was on display at the Blackgang Chine theme park in the Isle of Wight.

=== Filming ===
The film was shot on location and at Pinewood Studios London. Shooting locations included Alnwick Castle in Northumberland.

== Release ==
The film had its premiere at the Odeon, St. Martin's Lane, London on July 19, 1979, attended by Princess Margaret. It was later released through VHS on July 26, 1986.

== Reception ==
Variety wrote, "Pic has some good slapstick touches and offers a generous serving of visual tricks and space hardware, though on a par with Star Wars in that department it ain't." Linda Gross of the Los Angeles Times stated, "The film will provide mildly amusing summer fun for those having their first encounter with castles and kings. However, A Connecticut Yankee in King Arthur's Court, Knights of the Round Table and Camelot all captured the vigor of medieval England with more passion." Carla Hall of The Washington Post wrote: "The plot—obviously derived from 'A Connecticut Yankee in King Arthur's Court'—has the customary quantum of Disney cuteness as the story unravels predictably. But it takes advantage of the situation for some funny lines." Martyn Auty of The Monthly Film Bulletin stated: "Quintessentially Arthurian locations and resplendent colour quality (that owes more to the processing lab than to Northumberland) put this updated version of Mark Twain's A Connecticut Yankee in King Arthur's Court a cut above its predecessors in the current Disney craze for space-visitor yarns."

The film earned theatrical rentals of $4.475 million in the United States and Canada.
