= The Ant Bully (film) =

2006 film by John A. Davis

- Theatrical release poster
- Directed by: John A. Davis
- Screenplay by: John A. Davis
- Based on: The Ant Bully by John Nickle
- Produced by: Tom Hanks; Gary Goetzman; John A. Davis
- Starring: Julia Roberts; Nicolas Cage; Meryl Streep; Paul Giamatti; Regina King; Bruce Campbell; Lily Tomlin
- Edited by: Jon Price
- Music by: John Debney
- Production companies: Legendary Pictures; Playtone; DNA Productions
- Distributed by: Warner Bros. Pictures
- Release date: July 28, 2006
- Running time: 89 minutes
- Country: United States
- Language: English
- Budget: $45–50 million
- Box office: $55.2 million

The Ant Bully is a 2006 American animated fantasy comedy film loosely based on the children's book of the same name. Written and directed by John A. Davis, it tells the story of Lucas Nickle, a young boy who, after terrorizing a colony of ants, is shrunken and ordered to work amongst them. It stars the voices of Julia Roberts, Nicolas Cage, Meryl Streep, Paul Giamatti, Regina King, Bruce Campbell, Lily Tomlin, and Zach Tyler Eisen.

The Ant Bully was theatrically released on July 28, 2006 by Warner Bros. Pictures in the United States, and received mixed to favorable reviews. It underperformed at the box-office, grossing $55.2 million on a budget of $45‒50 million. As a result of its financial performance, DNA Productions underwent several layoffs before it shut down the same year.

== Plot ==
10-year-old Lucas Nickle is left with his older sister Tiffany and alien-obsessed grandmother when his parents go on vacation to Puerto Vallarta. Neglected by his family and tormented by a local bully named Steve, Lucas takes his anger out on an anthill in his front yard. Zoc, an eccentric wizard ant, wants to fight back, while Hova, a nurse ant who is fascinated by humans, wishes to communicate with Lucas. The leaders of the colony decide to shrink Lucas down to ant size using a shrinking potion Zoc created.

The local exterminator, Stan Beals, manipulates Lucas into signing a contract for his services, lying that Lucas' father ordered the services but forgot to sign the paperwork. That night, Zoc administers the shrinking potion into Lucas' ear while he sleeps. Now miniaturised, Lucas is carried to the anthill and put on trial: the Queen sentences him to hard labor. Hova volunteers to train Lucas, aided by her friends Kreela and Fugax. When the ants are attacked by wasps, Lucas uses a discarded firecracker to repel them, earning the respect of all but Zoc.

Lucas is shown a painting of a "Cloud-Breather", an ominous figure who heralds death. Recognizing the Cloud-Breather as Beals, Lucas convinces Hova, Fugax, and Kreela to visit his house. There, he attempts to phone Beals and terminate the contract, but unknowingly calls a pizzeria instead. Upon their return, Zoc intimidates Lucas into running away. They end up both getting swallowed by a frog, and finally begin to bond after freeing themselves.

The following day, Beals arrives to exterminate the colony, and Lucas and Zoc enlist the wasps' aid. During the final battle, Lucas saves the lives of Hova and an injured wasp. As Beals prepares to douse the anthill with pesticide, a beetle bites him in the testicles, causing him to double over in pain. Seizing the opportunity, Lucas, Zoc, and Hova inject Beals with the shrinking potion, severely disfiguring him into a dwarf. Beals flees on a tricycle while being chased away by the wasps.

The Queen declares Lucas an honorary ant for his heroism, naming him "Rokai", and Zoc returns Lucas to his normal size. Lucas scares Steve away by turning his friends against him and showers the colony with jellybeans.

== Voice cast ==
=== Main voice cast ===
- Julia Roberts as Hova, a nurse ant and Zoc's girlfriend
- Nicolas Cage as Zoc, a wizard ant and Hova's boyfriend
- Meryl Streep as the Queen Ant, the leader of the Ant colony
- Paul Giamatti as Stan Beals, a cigar-smoking local exterminator
- Zach Tyler Eisen as Lucas "Peanut" Nickle, a 10-year-old
- Regina King as Kreela, a forager ant and Fugax's girlfriend
- Bruce Campbell as Fugax, a scout ant and Kreela's boyfriend
- Lily Tomlin as Mommo, Lucas' grandmother
- Cheri Oteri as Doreen Nickle, Lucas' mother
- Larry Miller as Fred Nickle, Lucas' father
- Allison Mack as Tiffany Nickle, Lucas' teenage older sister
- Ricardo Montalbán as the Head of Council
- Myles Jeffrey as Steve, a 15-year-old boy bully.
- Jake T. Austin as Nicky, a neighborhood boy and Lucas's friend.
- Rob Paulsen as Beetle, a friendly green and purple beetle with feathery antennae
- S. Scott Bullock as Glow Worm, a glow worm with a Ben Stein-esque voice
- Mark DeCarlo as Fly, an unnamed fly who is swallowed by a frog
- Frank Welker as Spindle, Frog, and Caterpillar

=== Additional voice cast ===
- Tyler James Williams, Jared Goldsmith, Austin Majors, Jaishon Fisher, Aaron Michael Drozin and Max Burkholder as Blue Teammates
- Jake Goldberg, Jared Goldsmith, Sam Green, Colin Ford, Kendall Ryan Sanders and Shane Baumel as Red Teammates
- Jake Goldberg as Football Boy and Nob
- Tom Kenny as Drone Ant
- Nika Futterman, Tom Kenny, Scott Holst, Susan Silo, Paul Rugg, Larry Cedar, Nicole Sullivan, Jordan Orr (uncredited), Ken Mitchroney, Keith Alcorn and John A. Davis as Ants
- Sean Donnellan, Keith Alcorn and Don Frye as Soldier Ants
- Alfred Jackson as Slacking Ant
- Paul Greenberg and David Kaye as Sleeping Ants
- Paul Greenberg as Head Lices and Brett
- Ken Mitchroney and David Kaye as Guard Ants
- Richard Green as Wasp Leader
- Neil Ross, Bob Joles, Wally Wingert, Leon Morenzie, Johnathan Cook and Ken Mitchroney as Wasps
- Clive Robertson as Hova's Wasp
- S. Scott Bullock as Surviving Wasp
- Sarah Mensinga as Mother Ant
- Nissa Alcorn as Billo
- Denzel Whitaker as Albert
- Casey Masamitsu as Shigeko
- Bryan Fabian as Fernando
- Creagen Dow as Mullet Boy
- Zack Shada as Blonde Boy (uncredited)
- Benjamin Bryan as Boy (uncredited)
- Vernee Watson as Head Nurse Ant
- Candi Milo as Nurse Ant
- Pat Fraley, Fred Tatasciore (uncredited), Lori Tritel (uncredited) and Tress MacNeille as Ant Councils

== Production ==
Tom Hanks originally conceived the idea for an animated film adaptation of The Ant Bully after reading the book with his child. He then sent a copy to John A. Davis, due to Davis' work on the animated film Jimmy Neutron: Boy Genius (2001). Davis came up with a potential take on the story within a few days. "To be honest, when I first looked at it, I thought 'Oh, why does it have to be ants again?'" said Davis. "But the more I thought about it, I said, So what? It's got as much to do with The Incredible Shrinking Man as it does the other bug movies. It's a completely different story."

Hanks agreed that the story could be expanded considerably. Keith Alcorn, DNA Productions co-founder and one of the film's executive producers, had a similar initial reaction to the project as Davis did, recalling "My first thought was, 'not another ant movie.' But looking at the actual story, this was really about a little boy and how he learns about the world by having to live beneath the surface."

The film was rendered on DNA Productions' 1400-CPU render farm, managed by the open-source Sun Grid Engine job scheduler. The AMD Opteron nodes started out with Fedora Core 2 Linux with a modern 2.6.x kernel, but later updated to Fedora Core 4. Most of the applications are commercial, including Alias Maya, Lightwave 3D, Houdini, Massive and Pixar’s RenderMan.

Along with the theatrical release of The Ant Bully, an IMAX 3D version was presented in only some of the IMAX theaters. The others continued to run the 3D version of Superman Returns. The special IMAX 3D version was remastered in three dimensions with IMAX DMR. Critics within the 3D motion-picture community have given the film high marks as, unlike Superman Returns released the same year, the entire film is projected in 3D stereo. The process of turning a pure animation film into 3D is much simpler than converting a film with live actors. Some of the production took place at C.O.R.E. Digital Pictures in Canada.

== Music ==
The Ant Bully (Original Motion Picture Soundtrack)

Film score by John Debney
- Released: August 1, 2006
- Recorded: 2006
- Genre: Film score
- Length: 57:05
- Label: Varèse Sarabande
- Producer: John Debney

John Debney chronology
Chicken Little (2005)	The Ant Bully (Original Motion Picture Soundtrack) (2006)	Barnyard (2006)

Professional ratings
Review scores
Source	Rating
AllMusic	3.5/5 stars

The Ant Bully (Original Motion Picture Soundtrack) is the soundtrack album for the film. The score was composed and conducted by John Debney, who previously worked with Davis on Jimmy Neutron: Boy Genius, and performed by the Hollywood Studio Symphony. It was released on August 1, 2006, by Varèse Sarabande.

=== Track listing ===
No.	Title	Length
1.	"Parade of Ants"	1:02
2.	"Destroyer"	2:05
3.	"Sad Lucas"	0:59
4.	"Zac Attempts Potion"	1:43
5.	"Head of Council"	1:07
6.	"Parents Leave on Trip"	0:41
7.	"Zac Makes Potion"	0:56
8.	"Colony Floods"	0:47
9.	"Colony Destroyed"	1:27
10.	"Mommo Awakens"	2:05
11.	"The Queen"	2:11
12.	"Team Competition"	2:47
13.	"Wasp Attack"	3:58
14.	"Honeydew Feast"	2:25
15.	"The Ant Mother"	2:25
16.	"Sneaking Home"	1:20
17.	"Hang Gliding"	2:01
18.	"Jellybeans"	1:23
19.	"Frog Attack"	2:15
20.	"Zac and Lucas"	2:17
21.	"Exterminator Arrives"	3:02
22.	"Asking for Wasp Help"	1:37
23.	"Launching the Attack"	1:47
24.	"Assault on Stan"	6:05
25.	"Lucas Gets Named"	2:12
26.	"Home Coming"	1:13
27.	"Bullies and Sweet Rock"	4:59
Total length:		57:05

== Release and reception ==
The Ant Bully was theatrically released on July 28, 2006, by Warner Bros. Pictures. It was later released on DVD and Blu-ray on November 28, 2006, by Warner Home Video.

=== Box office ===
The film opened at number five on July 28, 2006, and closed on November 16, 2006, with $28 million in North America and a total of $55 million worldwide. The estimated production budget was $50 million. The film was released in the United Kingdom on August 4, 2006, and opened at number eight.

=== Critical response ===
Review aggregation website Rotten Tomatoes reported a 61% approval rating, based on 114 reviews, with an average rating of 6.3/10. The website's consensus reads, "Sometimes inventive and witty, this animated adventure into an ant-sized world is a pleasant diversion." On Metacritic, the film has a score of 59/100 based on 26 reviews, indicating "mixed or average reviews". Audiences surveyed by CinemaScore gave the film a grade "A−" on a scale of A to F.

Tom Long of The Detroit News wrote, "there's a sweet simplicity and humility to this film."

Ruthe Stein of The San Francisco Chronicle wrote that "the brilliance of The Ant Bully is in the crafty way it delves into the minds of ants as they plot to save themselves from extermination...Davis creates a marvelously labyrinthine society for them, right below the surface of a bland suburb."

Lisa Schwarzbaum of Entertainment Weekly liked Roberts and Cage in their roles, and referred to Streep's queen ant as "excellently magisterial". She also wrote that "the kind of life lessons that usually gum up the fun go down as easily as jelly beans in The Ant Bully." Jeffrey E. McCants of the Minneapolis Star Tribune wrote that "the film's heavy-handed lessons turn it from a fun romp through a cartoonish insect world to a predictable and preachy snoozefest".

Bill Muller of The Arizona Republic wrote, "The Ant Bully, in trying to match Antz or A Bug's Life, just digs itself into a big hole."

Jack Mathews of the New York Daily News was positive about the film's lack of pop-culture references and thought that the film does not "talk down" to children. Additionally, he noted, "adults may be amused (or maybe not) by the Christian parallel in the ants' religion."

== Video game ==
Games publisher Midway released The Ant Bully, the official video game tie-in to the film on GameCube, PlayStation 2, Microsoft Windows, and Game Boy Advance on July 24, 2006. A Wii version was released on December 5, 2006. The game was developed by the Montreal Studio Artificial Mind and Movement.

== See also ==
- List of films featuring miniature people
- FernGully: The Last Rainforest
- Once Upon a Forest
