= Melinda Hill =

American comedian and actress

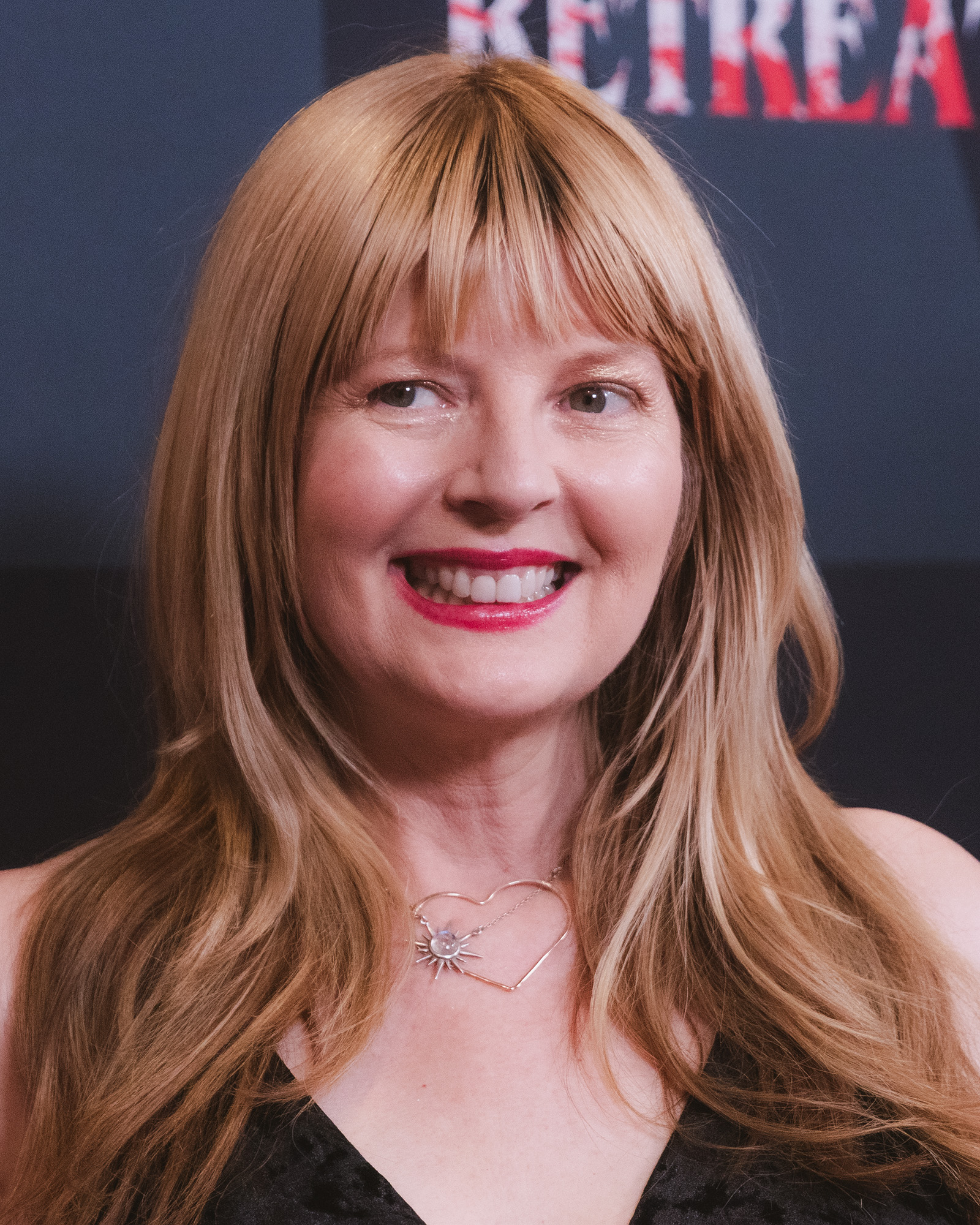
- Hill in 2026
- Born: 1972 (age 53–54); Hutchinson, Kansas, U.S.
- Occupations: Comedian; actress
- Known for: Stand-up comedy
- Notable work: Lady Dynamite

Melinda Hill (born 1972) is an American comedian and actress best known for her stand-up comedy and appearances in Lady Dynamite, Adventure Time, The Late Late Show, The Bonnie Hunt Show, Comics Unleashed, Who Wants to Date a Comedian?, and as the host of Comedy.TV.

== Early life and education ==
Hill was born in Hutchinson, Kansas but spent her formative years in Colorado Springs, which she considers home.

Hill won a theatre scholarship where she did plays and took writing classes. After her freshman year she transferred to the University of Kansas where she stayed for another year, before moving to California to study acting with Joanne Baron, Lesly Kahn and Sandra Seacat. When finishing acting school, one of her teachers advised her to go into comedy. Hill joined The Groundlings with no previous comedy experience. She took classes, learned to write sketches and advanced through all levels before starting stand-up, incorporating all she'd learned about character based comedy writing at the Groundlings. Her classmates included Mikey Day, Brian Keith Etheridge and Kristen Wiig.

== Stand-up comedy ==
In addition to becoming a regular at the Hollywood Improv and storytelling shows such as Jill Solloway and Maggie Rowe's Sit N Spin at Comedy Central Stage, Hill was made a paid regular comedian at The Comedy Store in Los Angeles in 2012 and her name was painted on the wall.

With Maria Bamford and Natasha Leggero, she cofounded the critically acclaimed stand-up comedy show What's Up, Tiger Lily? at Upright Citizens Brigade Theater (UCB), which ran for 10 years and was known for frequent celebrity drop-ins. Hill has performed for U.S. military troops in Hawaii, Guam, Singapore, Okinawa, Marshall Islands, Honduras, Bahamas, Guantanamo Bay, Curaçao and Greenland.

She has released several comedy albums, including Accidental Bisexual (2011) and Six Ways to Bomb on America's Got Talent (2013).

Her comedy special Inappropriate premiered on October 20, 2020, and was also released as a comedy album and audiobook.

== Television and film ==
As an actress, Hill has appeared on television in Lady Dynamite, Reno 911!, The Sarah Silverman Program, Important Things With Demetri Martin, Glory Daze, Roadies and Nick Swardson's Pretend Time, produced by Adam Sandler. She is also in the film Bright Day! opposite Bill Maher. As a voice actress, she can be heard in Adventure Time and in the Emmy Award-winning Citibank commercial "Outfit."

Hill created, wrote, and starred in the award-winning digital series Romantic Encounters which gained millions of views on multiple platforms and hosted an interview series in an alley behind her comedy show called All Growz Up with Melinda Hill. In 2014, with Bamford, she co-created, wrote, and starred in The Program (Funny or Die Productions), which was named one of LA Weekly's "10 Best Web Series of 2014." Her script Ghosted was recognized as one of 2017's top TV pilot scripts by women on advocacy group WeForShe's WriteHer list.

In 2019, Hill was cast in the romantic comedy Love, Weddings & Other Disasters (2020) playing the role of Svetlana opposite Diane Keaton, Jeremy Irons, King Bach, Maggie Grace, Diego Bonita, Elle King, Jesse McCartney and Dennis Dugan who also directed.

She launched her limited edition pandemic project podcast Let's Process This in April 2020. Some guests on her podcast include Margaret Cho, Mary Lynn Rajskub, Liz Feldman, Bridget McManus, Danny Zuker, Yassir Lester, Greg Behrendt, Grey DeLisle, Tara Strong, EG Daily and Tracy McMillan.

== Personal life ==
Hill lives in Los Angeles. In 1997, Hill appeared in the music video What's This Life For by Creed, as "the blonde girl in the Creed video."
