= Dennis Dugan =

American actor and film director (born 1946)

- Born: September 5, 1946 (age 80); Wheaton, Illinois, U.S.
- Occupations: Film director; actor; comedian
- Years active: 1968–present
- Notable work: Beverly Hills Ninja; Happy Gilmore; Big Daddy; Grown Ups
- Spouses: Joyce Van Patten (m. 1973; div. 1987): Sharon O'Connor (present)
- Children: 1

Dennis Dugan (/duːɡən/; born September 5, 1946) is an American film director, actor, and comedian. He is known for directing the films Problem Child, Brain Donors, Beverly Hills Ninja and National Security, and his partnership with comedic actor Adam Sandler, for whom he directed the films Happy Gilmore, Big Daddy, The Benchwarmers, I Now Pronounce You Chuck & Larry, You Don't Mess with the Zohan, Grown Ups, Just Go with It, Jack and Jill and Grown Ups 2. Dugan is a four-time Golden Raspberry Award for Worst Director nominee, winning once.

== Early life ==
Dugan was born in Wheaton, Illinois, the second of four sons of Marion, a housewife, and Charles Dugan, an insurance executive.

== Career ==
He moved to Hollywood in 1972 and appeared in his first television show, The Sixth Sense. Later, he played in the 1973 television film The Girl Most Likely to.... Other early film appearances include Night Call Nurses (1972), Night Moves (1975), Smile (1975), Harry and Walter Go to New York (1976) and Norman... Is That You? (1976). In 1979, he was cast as the time-displaced hero in Unidentified Flying Oddball, Disney's very loose adaptation of A Connecticut Yankee in King Arthur's Court. In 1981, he appeared in Joe Dante's The Howling.

Dugan made guest appearances on several television series during the 1970s including The Mod Squad, The Waltons, Cannon, Columbo, The Rockford Files, and Alice. He also appeared in the mini-series Rich Man, Poor Man, as well as two episodes of M*A*S*H and in 1978 starred in the short-lived series Richie Brockelman, Private Eye, a spin-off from The Rockford Files.

He took on a recurring role as an aspiring caped crusader who called himself "Captain Freedom" on Hill Street Blues. He also appeared on Empire (1984) and Shadow Chasers (1984). He played Walter Bishop, briefly the husband of Maddie Hayes (Cybill Shepherd) on Moonlighting. Dugan's other film credits of the 1980s include Water (1985), Can't Buy Me Love (1987), She's Having a Baby (1988), The New Adventures of Pippi Longstocking (1988) and Ron Howard's Parenthood (1989).

Dugan launched a career as a television and film director, making cameo appearances in many of his films. Ones he directed include the comedy Problem Child (1990), Brain Donors (1992), the comedy Saving Silverman (2001) (in which Dugan plays a football referee), the comedy National Security (2003), and the Adam Sandler comedies Happy Gilmore (1996) (in which Dugan plays Doug Thompson, the golf tour supervisor) and Big Daddy (1999) (with Dugan as a man who reluctantly gives candy to a trick-or-treating Julian). Dugan has directed episodes of such television series as Moonlighting (was also a guest star in some episodes), Ally McBeal, and NYPD Blue.

Dugan directed The Benchwarmers (2006), a comedy co-produced by Sandler, about a trio of men who try to make up for missed opportunities in childhood by forming a three-player baseball team to compete against Little League squads. Dugan himself has a bit part as Coach Bellows in that film while his dad Charles portrayed the Video Stop boss Marty. He then directed two more Sandler vehicles, I Now Pronounce You Chuck and Larry (2007) and You Don't Mess with the Zohan (2008).

Dugan directed Grown Ups (2010), which follows a group of high school friends who are reunited after thirty years for the Fourth of July. The film again stars Sandler, along with Kevin James, Chris Rock, David Spade, Rob Schneider, Salma Hayek, Maria Bello, and Maya Rudolph while Dugan had a bit part as a basketball referee; it was released in the summer of 2010 with major box office success.

As of December 2010, Dugan's films had grossed over $1.8 billion worldwide.

Dugan's Just Go with It (2011) was his sixth film with Sandler; it also stars Jennifer Aniston and Brooklyn Decker. Dugan directed Jack and Jill (2011), again with Sandler, and Grown Ups 2 (2013), with Sandler, James, Rock and Spade, all reprising their roles while Dugan had a bit part as Dr. Larry. Schneider was unable to reprise his role due to scheduling conflicts.

Dugan wrote, directed and acted in Love, Weddings & Other Disasters in 2020, which stars Diane Keaton, Jeremy Irons, Maggie Grace and Andrew Bachelor. He also wrote the songs, which were sung in the film by Elle King, and co-wrote the score for the film.

== Personal life ==
Dugan's first marriage was to actress Joyce Van Patten in 1973. They divorced in 1987, and he later wed Sharon O'Connor, to whom he is still married.

In June 2009, Dugan's son Kelly was drafted with the 75th overall selection by the Philadelphia Phillies in the Major League Baseball draft. A graduate of Notre Dame High School of Sherman Oaks, California, he played for five of the club's minor league teams through 2015, followed by shorter stays in the Chicago Cubs (2016) and Arizona Diamondbacks (2017) organizations before moving on to independent baseball (2018–2025).

== Filmography ==
=== Film ===
Director

Year	Title	Notes
1990	Problem Child	
1992	Brain Donors	
1996	Happy Gilmore	
1997	Beverly Hills Ninja	
1999	Big Daddy	
2001	Saving Silverman	Also known as Evil Woman
2003	National Security	
2006	The Benchwarmers	
2007	I Now Pronounce You Chuck & Larry	
2008	You Don't Mess with the Zohan	
2010	Grown Ups	
2011	Just Go with It	
2011	Jack and Jill	
2013	Grown Ups 2	
2020	Love, Weddings & Other Disasters	Also writer

Acting roles

Year	Title	Role
1976	Norman... Is That You?	Garson Hobart
1979	Unidentified Flying Oddball	Tom Trimble
1981	The Howling	Chris Halloran
1985	Water	Untitled
1987	Can't Buy Me Love	David Miller
1988	She's Having a Baby	Bill
1988	The New Adventures of Pippi Longstocking	Mr. Settigren
1989	Parenthood	David Brodsky
1990	Problem Child	All American Dad
1996	Happy Gilmore	Doug Thompson
1999	Big Daddy	Reluctant Trick-or-Treat Giver (uncredited)
2006	The Benchwarmers	Coach Bellows
2007	I Now Pronounce You Chuck & Larry	Cab Driver
2008	You Don't Mess With The Zohan	Homeless Guy
2010	Grown Ups	Basketball Referee
2012	That's My Boy	School janitor
2013	Grown Ups 2	Dr. Larry
2020	Love, Weddings & Other Disasters	Eddie Stone
2024	Knox Goes Away	Philo Jones
2024	Father There Is Only One 4	Himself
2025	Happy Gilmore 2	Doug Thompson

=== Television ===
Year	Title	Notes
1973	The Waltons	Episode: "The Theft"
1974	Cannon	Episode: "The Deadly Trail"
1976	Columbo	Episode: "Last Salute to the Commodore"
1978–79	The Rockford Files	3 episodes
1978	Richie Brockelman, Private Eye	5 episodes
1979	Supertrain	Episode: "Superstar"
1981	It's a Living	Episode: “Second Time Around, Almost”
1982	Hill Street Blues	4 episodes
1987	Hunter	2 episodes
1988	Wiseguy	Episode: "Phantom Pain"
1988–89	Moonlighting	5 episodes
1985–86	Shadow Chasers	14 episodes
1975, 1983	M*A*S*H	2 episodes
1993	Doogie Howser, M.D.	Episode: "What Makes Doogie Run"
1993	Columbo	Episode: "Butterfly in Shades of Grey"
1993–94	L.A. Law	2 episodes
1993–2004	NYPD Blue	
1994	Burke's Law	Episode: "Who Killed Nick Hazard?"
1994	Traps	
1994	The Byrds of Paradise	2 episodes
1994–95	Picket Fences	2 episodes
1995	Marker	Episode: "The Pilot"
1995	Chicago Hope	Episode: "Freeze Outs"
1998	Love Boat: The Next Wave	Episode: "Smooth Sailing"
1998	Ally McBeal	Episode: "Alone Again"
1999	Shasta McNasty	Episode: "Pilot"
2004	The Mullets	Episode: "Silent But Deadly"
2005	Hope & Faith	Episode: "Wife Swap" (Parts 1 and 2)

TV movies

- The Shaggy Dog (1994)
- A Screwball Homicide (2003)
- Karroll's Christmas (2004)

== Awards and nominations ==
Year	Award	Category	Title	Result
1999	Golden Raspberry Awards	Worst Director	Big Daddy	Nominated
2007	Golden Raspberry Awards	Worst Director	I Now Pronounce You Chuck & Larry	Nominated
2011	Golden Raspberry Awards	Worst Director	Just Go with It	Won
2011	Golden Raspberry Awards	Worst Director	Jack and Jill	Won
2013	Golden Raspberry Awards	Worst Director	Grown Ups 2	Nominated
