= Grown Ups 2 =

2013 film by Dennis Dugan

- Theatrical release poster
- Directed by: Dennis Dugan
- Written by: Fred Wolf; Adam Sandler; Tim Herlihy
- Based on: Grown Ups by Adam Sandler; Fred Wolf
- Produced by: Adam Sandler; Jack Giarraputo
- Starring: Adam Sandler; Kevin James; Chris Rock; David Spade; Salma Hayek; Maya Rudolph; Maria Bello; Nick Swardson
- Cinematography: Theo van de Sande
- Edited by: Tom Costain
- Music by: Rupert Gregson-Williams
- Production companies: Columbia Pictures; Happy Madison Productions
- Distributed by: Sony Pictures Releasing
- Release date: July 12, 2013
- Running time: 101 minutes
- Country: United States
- Language: English
- Budget: $80 million
- Box office: $247 million

Grown Ups 2 is a 2013 American comedy film starring Adam Sandler, Kevin James, Chris Rock and David Spade. The sequel to the 2010 film, Grown Ups, it was directed by Dennis Dugan, written by Sandler, Fred Wolf, and Tim Herlihy. Alongside the quartet, as well as Salma Hayek, Maya Rudolph, and Maria Bello, several actors also reprise their roles from the previous film, with Nick Swardson joining them. In the film, Lenny (Sandler) moves his family back to his hometown, where he reunites with his old friends. Together, they face bizarre situations and new enemies in the form of a local fraternity.

Produced by Sandler's production company Happy Madison Productions and distributed by Sony Pictures Releasing, Grown Ups 2 was released on July 12, 2013. It was panned by critics, but grossed $247 million on an $80 million budget. It was nominated for nine Razzies at the 2014 Golden Raspberry Awards. A third film is currently in development.

== Plot ==
Three years after the events of the first film, Lenny Feder has relocated his family to his hometown of Stanton, where his friends Eric Lamonsoff, Kurt McKenzie, and Marcus Higgins also live. Lenny wakes up in his bedroom to find a deer which wreaks havoc through the house until he uses his daughter Becky's stuffed animal, Mr. Gigglesworth, to lure it outside, where it tears him apart.

Lenny dismisses his wife Roxanne's suggestion that they have another child; Eric worries that his wife Sally is encouraging their children's self-confidence above all else; Kurt gives his wife Deanne a gift for their anniversary, which she has forgotten; and Marcus prepares to spend the summer with Braden, his recently discovered son from one of his previous relationships, but is intimidated by Braden, who deeply hates him.

Lenny commandeers his children's school bus from Nick, the unstable driver and also the brother of Rob Hillard, and takes everyone to their last day of school. He picks up Kurt and Eric and visits K-Mart, where they are joined by Marcus, who has sent Braden to school. Kurt persuades Lenny to throw a party for the first day of summer, and the friends discuss Lenny's childhood bully, Tommy Cavanaugh. Police officers Fluzoo and Dante escort them to Becky's ballet recital at McDonough Elementary, where Lenny runs into Tommy, who openly threatens him.

As school ends, Kurt's daughter Charlotte agrees to go on a date, Lenny's younger son Keith struggles with his own bully Duffy, and Charlotte and Keith's older brothers Andre and Greg accompany Braden to an abandoned quarry, where they join a college party.

After humiliating their old rival Dickie at the Ice Cream House, Lenny, Eric, Kurt, and Marcus visit the same quarry, where they swam during their youth. There, they are confronted by a hostile college fraternity led by Milo and Andy, who force them to jump in naked from the highest point. Finding their fraternity house vandalized, the frat boys blame Lenny and his friends and swear revenge. Later, the friends take Marcus' van, vandalized by Braden, to Eric's auto body shop, and Marcus inadvertently rolls through town in a giant runaway construction tire.

Lenny learns that Keith is a gifted football kicker, but accidentally breaks his son's leg. Eric apologizes to Sally for avoiding her to spend time with his mother. Lenny becomes suspicious of Kyle's relationship with Roxanne, who is angered by her employee Penny's lifelong obsession with Lenny. Marcus bonds with Braden, Charlotte goes on her date, Andre passes his driving test overseen by Wiley, and Greg succeeds in asking out Nancy Arbuckle, a girl he has a crush on.

Roxanne tells Lenny that she is pregnant, and most of the town arrives for the Feders' 1980s-themed party. Lenny realizes she is not having an affair with Kyle, who is gay, and who has repaired Becky's stuffed animal. He challenges Tommy to a fight, who takes a dive to allow Lenny to look tough in front of his bullied son.

Soon after, the fraternity crashes the party, looking for the culprit of the frat house vandalism, to which Braden admits. When the fraternity members insult the townsfolk, a massive brawl breaks out between them. The partygoers eventually defeat the fraternity, with Andy getting attacked by the deer, thanks to Becky's tactic with her stuffed animal.

Afterward, Lenny, his friends, Nick, and Dickie enjoy a meal at Mrs. Lamonsoff's house, reminiscing about their childhood together. Eric's mother reassures Lenny about his new baby, so he returns home to Roxanne and they reconcile, looking forward to their growing family.

== Cast ==
- Adam Sandler as Lenny Feder, a Hollywood talent agent who moves his family back to his hometown.
- Kevin James as Eric Lamonsoff, a friend of Lenny who used to work at a furniture store and now runs Lamonsoff Auto Repair.
- Chris Rock as Kurt McKenzie, a friend of Lenny who works as a cableman.
- David Spade as Marcus Higgins, a friend of Lenny who is a slacker and a lothario.
- Salma Hayek as Roxanne Chase-Feder, a fashion designer who is Lenny's wife.
- Maya Rudolph as Deanne McKenzie, Kurt's wife.
- Maria Bello as Sally Lamonsoff, Eric's wife.
- Nick Swardson as Nick Hilliard, an unstable bus driver and estranged brother of Rob Hilliard (played by Rob Schneider in the first film).
- Colin Quinn as Dickie Bailey, an old rival of Lenny who now works at the Ice Cream House.
- Steve Buscemi as Wiley, one of Dickie's friends. He works as a driver's ed instructor and has regained 40% of feeling in his body following the incident in the last film.
- Tim Meadows as Malcolm Fluzoo, one of Dickie's friends and an old rival of Kurt who works at K-Mart. Meadows had to wear a bald cap to make his character look bald.
- Jon Lovitz as a Squats Fitness janitor.
- Shaquille O'Neal as Officer Fluzoo, a police officer of the Stanton Police Department who is the big but younger brother of Malcolm.
- Alexander Ludwig as Braden, the 17-year-old son of Marcus from one of his old flings.
- Georgia Engel as Mrs. Lamonsoff, the mother of Eric and the mother-in-law of Sally.
- Peter Dante as Officer Dante, a police officer of the Stanton Police Department who is Officer Fluzoo's partner.
- Oliver Hudson as Kyle, a gay yoga teacher at Squats Fitness.
- Allen Covert as a hippie teacher at Stanton High School.
- Steve Austin as Tommy Cavanaugh, a former bully of Lenny.
- Taylor Lautner (uncredited) as Andy, the leader of the Kappa Eta Sigma fraternity that antagonizes Lenny, Eric, Kurt, and Marcus.
- Jake Goldberg as Greg Feder, the 17-year-old and the oldest son of Lenny and Roxanne who becomes Dickie's co-worker at the Ice Cream House.
- Cameron Boyce as Keithie Feder, the 14-year-old son of Lenny and Roxanne.
- Alexys Nycole Sanchez as Becky Feder, the 8-year-old daughter of Lenny and Roxanne.
- Ada-Nicole Sanger as Donna Lamonsoff, the 14-year-old daughter of Eric and Sally.
- Frank and Morgan Gingerich as Bean Lamonsoff, the 7-year-old son of Eric and Sally who was formerly breast-fed.
- Nadji Jeter as Andre McKenzie, the 17-year-old son of Kurt and Deanne and Greg's best friend.
- China Anne McClain as Charlotte McKenzie, the 14-year-old daughter of Kurt and Deanne.
- Kaleo Elam as Ronnie McKenzie, the 3-year-old and the latest child of Kurt and Deanne.
- Cheri Oteri as Penny, Wiley's wife and an employee of Roxanne who obsesses over Lenny ever since they briefly dated in the 6th grade.
- Ellen Cleghorne as Mary Fluzoo, the wife of Malcolm.
- Dan Patrick as a gym teacher at Stanton High School.
- Ebony Jo-Ann as Mama Ronzoni, the mother of Deanne and the mother-in-law of Kurt.
- Halston Sage as Nancy Arbuckle, a girl who is Greg's love interest.
- Norm Crosby as a K-Mart employee.
- Dennis Dugan as Dr. Larry, a doctor who patches up Keithie's leg.
- Jonathan Loughran as Robideaux, a cross-eyed man and one of Dickie's friends who works with Malcolm at K-Mart.
- Richie Minervini as Principal Tardio, one of Dickie's friends who is the principal of Stanton High School.
- Jackie Sandler as Jackie Tardio, the wife of Principal Tardio.
- Sadie Sandler as Sadie Tardio, the daughter of Principal Tardio.
- Sunny Sandler as Sunny Tardio, the daughter of Principal Tardio.
- Chris Berman as The Great Renaldo.
- Kris Murrell as Beefcake Kitty, a mechanic that Marcus falls for.
- Kevin Grady as Muzby, one of Dickie's friends.
- Aly Michalka as Bikini Girl Savannah.
- Paulina Gretzky as Bikini Girl Daisy.
- Kamil McFadden as Bumpty Fluzoo, the son of Malcolm and Mary who falls for Charlotte.
- Alex Poncio as Duffy, a fat teenager who picks on Keithie.
- Patrick Schwarzenegger, David Henrie, Chris Titone, Jared Sandler, Jimmy Sandler, and Jimmy Tatro as Frat Boys.
- Brad Grunberg as a mailman who comes across the deer in Lenny's yard.
- Andy Samberg, Jorma Taccone, Bobby Moynihan, Akiva Schaffer, Taran Killam, Paul Brittain and an uncredited Will Forte as Male Cheerleaders.
- Erin Heatherton as Ginger, the Head Cheerleader.
- Milo Ventimiglia as Milo, Andy's best friend who also acts as the right-hand person of the Kappa Eta Sigma fraternity.

The J. Geils Band members Peter Wolf, Seth Justman, Magic Dick, and Danny Klein as well as the group's known tour members Duke Levine and Tom Arey appear as the party band which is identified as Lenny's friends from the aforementioned group.

== Production ==
Filming of Grown Ups 2 began on May 2, 2012, in Swampscott, Massachusetts, which portrayed the fictional town of Stanton, Connecticut, and ended on July 15, 2012. Some scenes were filmed in Saugus, Massachusetts. Columbia Pictures and Happy Madison Productions produced the film. The film was written by Adam Sandler, Fred Wolf and Tim Herlihy and directed by Dennis Dugan, Sandler's longtime collaborator. The film was released on July 12, 2013, in the United States. It was released on August 9, 2013, in the United Kingdom. Rob Schneider, who played Rob Hilliard in the first film, was unable to reprise his role, because of scheduling conflicts with Rob, and also because his wife Patricia was pregnant during production.

This is the first film sequel that Adam Sandler has starred in. It has a role played by WWE Hall of Famer Steve Austin. Stand-up comedian Chris Hardwick confirmed a cameo as an ice cream vendor via his Facebook page, but it was cut from the film. The film features a cameo appearance by New York Yankees television announcer Michael Kay and includes Shaquille O'Neal as a cop. In July 2012, it was announced that Arnold Schwarzenegger's son, Patrick, would be appearing as one of the frat brothers. Oliver Cooper was offered a role as one of the fraternity brothers, but he had to back out due to scheduling conflicts.

== Release ==
The first trailer for the film was released on April 2, 2013. The film was released theatrically on July 12, 2013, in the United States.

=== Home media ===
Grown Ups 2 was released on DVD and Blu-ray on November 5, 2013, by Sony Pictures Home Entertainment.

== Reception ==
=== Box office ===
Grown Ups 2 grossed $133.7 million in North America and $113.4 million in other territories for a worldwide total of $247 million, against a budget of $80 million. It made a net profit of $48 million when factoring together all expenses and revenues for the film.

In the U.S., the film earned $16.3 million on its opening day, Grown Ups 2 was released on July 12, 2013, alongside Pacific Rim. and opened to number two in its first weekend, with $41.5 million, behind Despicable Me 2. In its second weekend, the film dropped to number four, grossing $19.9 million. In its third and fourth weekends, the film made $11.6 million and $7.9 million, respectively.

=== Critical response ===
On Rotten Tomatoes, Grown Ups 2 has an approval percentage of 8% based on 114 reviews and a rating of 3/10. The critics consensus reads: "While it's almost certainly the movie event of the year for filmgoers passionate about deer urine humor, Grown Ups 2 will bore, annoy, and disgust audiences of nearly every other persuasion." On Metacritic, the film has a score of 19 out of 100 based on 28 critic reviews, meaning "overwhelming dislike". Audiences polled by CinemaScore gave the film an average grade of "B" on an A+ to F scale.

John DeFore of The Hollywood Reporter said, "Throughout, gags are cartoonishly broad and afforded so little time for setup and delivery we seem to be watching less a story than a catalog of tossed-out material." Andrew Barker of Variety said, "Among the slackest, laziest, least movie-like movies released by a major studio in the last decade, "Grown Ups 2" is perhaps the closest Hollywood has yet come to making "Ow, My Balls!" seem like a plausible future project." Mick LaSalle of the San Francisco Chronicle gave the film one out of four stars, saying, "The temptation arises to say something nice about "Grown Ups 2" just because it doesn't cause injury. But no, it's a bad movie, just old-school bad, the kind that's merely lousy and not an occasion for migraines or night sweats."

Linda Barnard of the Toronto Star gave the film zero out of four stars, saying, "Adam Sandler scrapes the bottom of the barrel—and then he pukes into it—with Grown Ups 2, a lazily cribbed-together swamp of pointless and unfunny sketches that makes 2010’s Grown Ups look like Citizen Kane." Matt Patches of Time Out New York gave the film one out of five stars, saying, "In the first five minutes, a deer walks into the star's bedroom and urinates on his face. It's all downhill from there."

Rafer Guzman of Newsday gave the film one out of four stars, saying, "For all its warm and fuzzy notions of family and community, Grown Ups 2... has a desperate reliance on nasty jokes about pee, poo and – with surprising frequency – gay panic." Owen Gleiberman of Entertainment Weekly, who gave the film a B, said, "In certain ways, Grown Ups 2 marks a return to classically Sandlerian infantile anarchy." Mark Olsen of the Los Angeles Times gave the film one and a half stars out of five, saying, "Grown Ups 2 looks like it was a lot of fun to make. And the last laugh is on us."

Elizabeth Weitzman of the New York Daily News gave the film two out of five stars, saying, "Like most Adam Sandler movies, it’s exactly like most Adam Sandler movies... This movie stars all Sandler’s buddies and gleefully embraces lowbrow crudity even while promoting loving family values." Ignatiy Vishnevetsky of The A.V. Club gave the film a D−, saying, "Largely free of Sandler’s usual schmaltz and lame romance, it’s pure plotless, grotesque high jinks, bizarre and inept in a way that’s fascinating without ever being all that funny." Nick Schager of The Village Voice gave the film a negative review, saying "A few decent one-liners notwithstanding, the movie comes off as willfully uninspired."

Claudia Puig of USA Today gave the film one star out of four, saying, "Mystifyingly, the movie manages to emerge plot-free. Instead, it offers a succession of humorless gross-out gags, fat jokes, suggestive posturing, bullying, belches, and pratfalls. Life is simple – and gross – in Sandlerville." Sara Stewart of the New York Post gave the film half a star out of four, saying, "The movie lurches from one gross-out scene to another, flipping the bird at continuity and logic. It honestly seems as if Sandler and his team descended on a random suburb, halfheartedly improvising and moving on when they got bored." Stephanie Merry of The Washington Post gave the film one and a half stars out of four, saying, "Grown Ups 2 isn’t merely mindless. At times it seems to actually drain IQ points from its viewers while wasting a talented cast of "Saturday Night Live" alums, who are all capable of being much smarter and so much funnier."

Andy Webster of The New York Times gave the film one out of five stars, saying, "This is pap, plain and simple: scattered raunch-lite devoid of emotional resonance. At best, it sells itself on the spectacle of a TV show’s cast reunion—and even then it disappoints. With the debacles of That's My Boy and Jack and Jill, Mr. Sandler has increasingly squandered his comic capital. His onetime SNL brethren do themselves few favors—beyond a paycheck—by working in his orbit." Peter Keough of The Boston Globe gave the film one and a half stars out of four, saying, "Apparently the world demanded another family-friendly version of The Hangover, one that combined scatological comedy with smarmy sentimentality."

Connie Ogle of the Miami Herald gave the film one out of four stars, saying, "Nobody escapes untainted by the foul stench of Grown Ups 2; it’s bad enough to make you look askance at Salma Hayek, Maria Bello, and Maya Rudolph, all of whom deserve a chance to do something funny other than pose as wives exuding various degrees of sexiness." Richard Roeper gave the film one and a half stars, saying, "When Taylor Lautner is the funniest thing in a movie starring Adam Sandler and Chris Rock, we're in trouble."

Randy Cordova of The Arizona Republic gave the film one out of five stars, saying, "In its own way, "Grown Ups 2" sets the bar really high. After all, it’s hard to imagine another comedy coming along this year that is this abrasive and free of laughs. It’s like everyone involved intentionally tried to create a horrible movie." Alonso Duralde of The Wrap wrote, "Yes, it's time for another visit to the Adam Sandler Death-of-Cinema Fun Factory, the big-screen version of a terrible sitcom where laugh tracks are replaced by the co-stars chuckling at their own awful material."

Adam Nayman of The Globe and Mail gave the film two out of four stars, saying, "None of the stars are trying very hard, and so the most memorable presences are the cameos: If nothing else, Grown Ups 2 will go down as the only film in history to find room for Steve Buscemi alongside "Stone Cold" Steve Austin."

In 2014, comedians Tim Batt and Guy Montgomery watched the film every week for a full year for the first season of their podcast, The Worst Idea of All Time.

=== Accolades ===
List of awards and nominations
Award	Category	Recipients	Result
2014 Golden Raspberry Awards
2014 Golden Raspberry Awards	Worst Picture	Grown Ups 2	Nominated
2014 Golden Raspberry Awards	Worst Director	Dennis Dugan	Nominated
2014 Golden Raspberry Awards	Worst Actor	Adam Sandler	Nominated
2014 Golden Raspberry Awards	Worst Supporting Actor	Taylor Lautner	Nominated
2014 Golden Raspberry Awards	Worst Supporting Actor	Nick Swardson	Nominated
2014 Golden Raspberry Awards	Worst Supporting Actress	Salma Hayek	Nominated
2014 Golden Raspberry Awards	Worst Screenplay	Adam Sandler, Tim Herlihy and Fred Wolf	Nominated
2014 Golden Raspberry Awards	Worst Screen Combo	The entire cast of Grown Ups 2	Nominated
2014 Golden Raspberry Awards	Worst Prequel, Remake, Rip-off or Sequel	Grown Ups 2	Nominated
Kids' Choice Awards	Favorite Movie Actor	Adam Sandler	Won

== Music ==
Songs featured in the film:

- "Werewolves of London" - Warren Zevon
- "Driver's Seat" - Sniff 'n' the Tears
- "Tired of Toein' the Line" - Rocky Burnette
- "End of the World (Party One More Time) - The PlaceMints [feat. Boogieman]
- "Teach Me How to Dougie" - Cali Swag District
- "Roller" - April Wine
- "U Can't Touch This" - sung by Ada-Nicole Sanger (originally by MC Hammer)
- "Dancing on Top of the World (R8d!o's New Swag Remix)" - The PlaceMints [feat. Boogieman]
- "Cherry Pie" - Warrant
- "New Song" - Howard Jones
- "Love Plus One" - Haircut One Hundred
- "One in a Million" - The Romantics
- "Say It Isn't So" - The Outfield
- "Bat Out of Hell" - sung by Kevin James (originally by Meat Loaf)
- "Dancing with Myself" - Generation X/Billy Idol
- "Heaven" - Bryan Adams
- "Never Tell an Angel" - The Stompers
- "Bizarre Love Triangle" - New Order
- "Centerfold" - The J. Geils Band
- "Night Time" - The J. Geils Band
- "Give It to Me" - The J. Geils Band
- "Where Did Our Love Go" - The J. Geils Band
- "Lonely Is the Night" - Billy Squier
- "Relax" - Frankie Goes to Hollywood
- "(Ain't Nothin' But a) House Party" - The J. Geils Band
- "I Wanna Go Back" - Eddie Money
- "Live Every Moment" - REO Speedwagon

Songs that only appeared in the trailer:

- "China Grove" - The Doobie Brothers
- "Since You Been Gone" - Rainbow
- "Nothin' But a Good Time" - Poison

== Sequel ==
Maria Bello said in an August 2016 interview, "People have talked about it and we've heard it might happen, but I don't know if there is a script, I don't know what there is. But I hope so because, boy, it's fun to work with those guys." In January 2020, comedian Tom Scharpling gained attention for uploading an unofficial and unaffiliated Grown Ups 3 script, written in April 2019, to Twitter. In July 2025, while promoting his film Happy Gilmore 2, Sandler hinted a sequel was possible once a story had been greenlit. Rob Schneider expressed support in a sequel following his absence in the second film. In May 2026, a sequel was announced for Netflix with Kyle Newacheck directing. Sunny Sandler revealed that principal photography had begun in August 2026.
