= The Ant Bully =

1999 children's book by John Nickle

- The Ant Bully book cover
- Author: John Nickle
- Illustrator: John Nickle
- Language: English
- Genre: Children's literature Fantasy
- Publisher: Scholastic Press, a division of Scholastic Books
- Publication date: 1999
- ISBN: 0590395912

The Ant Bully (ISBN 0590395912) is a 1999 children's book drawn and written by John Nickle. It is about a young boy named Lucas, who is the title character in the book and who likes to torment ants. It was later adapted into the 2006 animated film of the same name by John A. Davis, produced by Legendary Pictures and DNA Productions for Warner Bros. Pictures.

== Story ==
Lucas is a boy who is perceived as "strange" by his peers due to his funny glasses and propeller beanie (hat). Sid, the neighborhood bully, continuously bullies Lucas by spraying him with a water hose and stealing his hat. In an attempt to cope with Sid's actions, Lucas projects his anger onto a local colony of ants by spraying them with water, just as Sid has done to him.

The ants have enough and tackle and shove Lucas into the queen's chamber, and the queen confronts him about all of the trouble he has caused the colony. When Lucas is too shocked to even respond to her, the queen takes it as an insult, and orders an ant wizard to shrink the boy down to the size of an ant and take him to trial, where the judge declares him guilty. His punishment is to work hard like an ant, working in the field, gathering food, defending the colony from wasps and spiders, and taking care of the queen, the worst part of his punishment.

After a while, the queen tells Lucas that he has one last test to be set free: he must go home and bring her a Red Sweet Rock (jelly bean). Lucas brings two ants with him on the journey, and they ask him what it's like being a giant. Lucas tells them that he isn't a giant and gets picked on by Sid, who does all the same things Lucas does to the ants. When they reach his house, they find a box of swell jells, but Lucas' father sees the ants and tries to smash them with a fly swatter. Lucas shouts at his dad to stop, helping the ants to escape. Meanwhile, the queen is upset, fearing that Lucas was killed, but to her surprise he returns, and as promised she gives him the potion to return him to his right size. Lucas falls asleep and wakes up to see Sid, only to his surprise the ants got to him first and shrunk him as revenge.
