= Richard Dennis (disambiguation) =

Richard Dennis (born 1949) is an American commodities trader.

Richard Dennis may also refer to:

- Richard Dennis (footballer) (born 1966), Australian rules footballer
- Richard Dennis (Medal of Honor) (1826–?), American Civil War sailor
- Richard Harry Dennis (1897–1972), English police officer and detective
- Ricky Dennis, American motorsports businessman
- Richard William George Dennis (1910–2003), English botanist

== See also ==
- Richard Denniss, Australian economist, author and public policy commentator
- Richard Denys, English MP for Bath and Gloucestershire
