= KTGG =

Christian radio station in Spring Arbor, Michigan, United States

- Okemos, Michigan; United States
- Broadcast area: Jackson and Lansing, Michigan
- Frequency: 1540 kHz

Programming
- Format: Christian radio
- Affiliations: Strong Tower Radio

Ownership
- Owner: West Central Michigan Media Ministries

History
- First air date: August 15, 1985

Technical information
- Licensing authority: FCC
- Facility ID: 61993
- Class: D
- Power: 400 watts day 219 watts critical hours
- Transmitter coordinates: 42°43′13″N 84°31′11″W
- Repeaters: W222CU (92.3 MHz, Charlotte); W284AH (104.7 MHz, Lansing)

Links
- Public license information: Public file; LMS
- Website: http://www.strongtowerradio.org/

KTGG (1540 AM) is a radio station broadcasting from Okemos, Michigan, with a Christian radio format of talk and classical music. It is owned by West Central Michigan Media Ministries and airs programming from Strong Tower Radio, a network heard on 23 radio stations around Michigan and two in central Illinois.

Because AM 1540 is a clear channel frequency reserved for Class A stations KXEL in Waterloo, Iowa, and ZNS-1 in Nassau, Bahamas, KTGG is a daytimer station. To avoid interference, it must sign off at night. By day it broadcasts at 450 watts and during critical hours (just before sunrise and just after sunset) it is powered at 219 watts.

Until August 2014, KTGG was simulcast on AM 1510 WJKN in Jackson, Michigan. WJKN has since been sold to Jackson-Lansing Catholic Radio.

== Unusual call sign ==
Call signs beginning with K are generally issued only to broadcasting stations west of the Mississippi River, so it was unusual that the call letters KTGG were issued for this new station in 1980. Some believe this occurred when someone at the Federal Communications Commission (FCC) mistook "MI" (the postal abbreviation for Michigan) on the station's application as the abbreviation for the western states of Missouri or Minnesota. KTGG thus became the first new station east of the Mississippi with a "K" call sign in decades. The river was first used as the divider between K and W call signs beginning in January 1923. The original boundary, dating to 1912, had been even farther west, and there had been a few earlier exceptions, including Pittsburgh's KDKA in 1920, and KYW in Philadelphia (originally in Chicago in 1921), which have retained their heritage non-conforming call letters.

However, KTGG wasn't the last broadcaster with this distinction. A new station in Napeague, New York, was originally dubbed KCBE in 2008 by the FCC, before changing to WEGB in 2009. Since then, several non-commercial religious radio stations east of the Mississippi have gone on the air with K call letters. In most cases it was because their construction permit and call letters were issued for a location west of the Mississippi but the owner relocated the station to east of the Mississippi before it was built. Most of them are owned by the Educational Media Foundation, the Hispanic Family Christian Network or Holy Family Radio.

== History ==
Its frequency was previously used by a station called WMRR, which existed in the 1960s. AM 1510 was a country music station for over three decades under several call signs, including WJCO, WDJD, and WHBT. The WJKN calls were adopted in 1995 and the format changed to a full-service combination of news, talk and adult contemporary music. In 1998, WJKN phased out music programming and became a predominantly news-talk station. Then, in September 2000, the station went dark after owner Coltrace Communications (the owner of WUPS in Houghton Lake) sold the land on which the station's towers were located to a developer. Shortly afterward, Coltrace donated WJKN to its former owner, Spring Arbor University, which returned the station to the air briefly in late 2001 and early 2002 with a simulcast of 106.9 WSAE). WJKN was then again dark for several months, and then resurfaced in March 2003 simulcasting KTGG, whose 450-watt signal does not make it far outside of Spring Arbor. In July 2016, KTGG was sold to West Central Michigan Media Ministries for $230,000. KTGG, as of June 2017, is broadcasting a simulicast of Strong Tower Radio 91.9 WGCP-FM Cadillac, Michigan. KTGG remains on after sunset with 185 watts during critical hours.

== WJKN sale and KTGG format change ==
In April 2014, it was announced that Spring Arbor University was selling WJKN 1510 to Jackson-Lansing Catholic Radio (d/b/a Good Shepherd Radio). This was the Catholic broadcaster's second go at getting a radio station in the Jackson area, as they had been in the process of buying the now-defunct WJKQ 88.5 FM when that station's license was revoked by the FCC. The sale was completed in August 2014. WJKN and FM translator 93.3 W227BY began airing a Catholic talk format identifying as Good Shepherd Catholic Radio. W227BY was also formerly owned by Spring Arbor University and operated out of Somerset, Michigan as a translator of WSAE 106.9 FM.

Effective November 12, 2015, Spring Arbor University consummated the sale of KTGG to West Central Michigan Media Ministries for $230,000. In December 2014, KTGG dropped its previous Christian inspirational music format and became the new home of "The Message," the Christian music and teaching format formerly heard on sister station WJKN-FM 89.3, which at that time became a simulcast of WSAE's "Home.FM" programming. Like the former inspirational music format, 'The Message" features music programming hosted by Spring Arbor students.

== Translators ==
Call sign	Frequency	City of license	FID	ERP (W)	HAAT	Class	FCC info
W284AH	104.7 FM	Lansing, Michigan	77818	250	95 m (312 ft)	D	LMS
W222CU	92.3 FM	Charlotte, Michigan	201492	250	11 m (36 ft)	D	LMS
