= Everett Piper =

American academic and writer (born 1959)

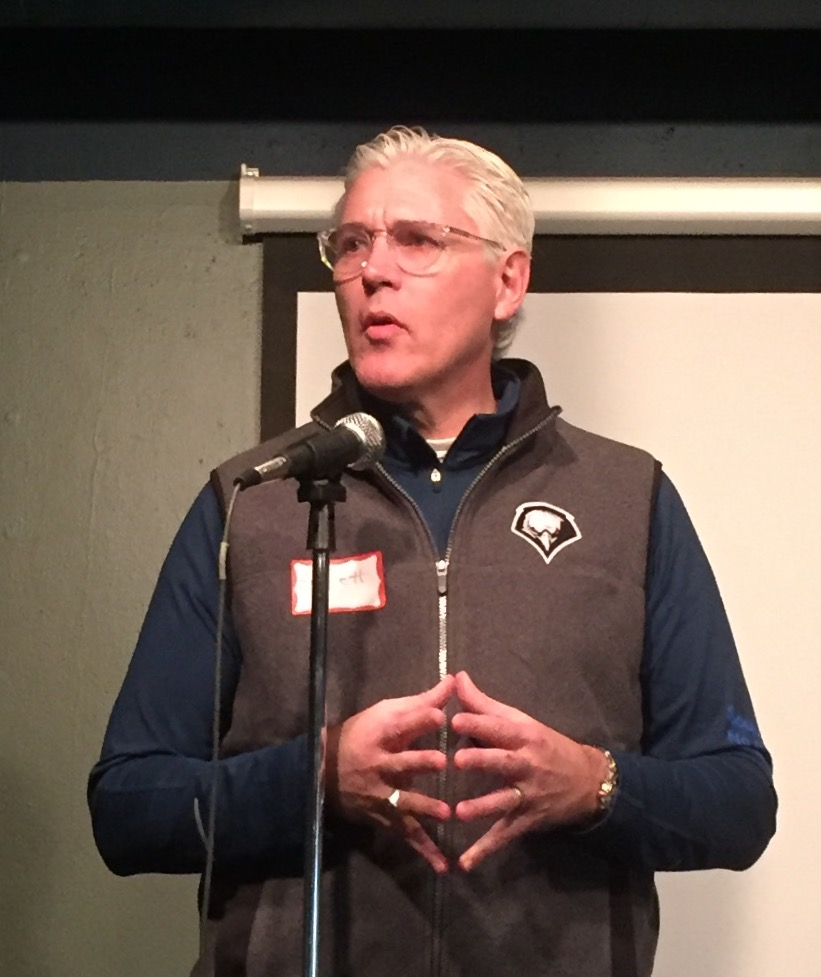
- Piper in January 2016
- Born: 1959 (age 66–67); Michigan, United States
- Education: Spring Arbor University; Bowling Green State University; Michigan State University
- Occupations: Academic and writer

Everett Piper (born 1959) is an American writer, retired university administrator, and conservative commentator. He is the author of the national best seller, Not a Day Care: The Devastating Consequences of Abandoning Truth and a columnist for The Washington Times.

Piper served as President of Oklahoma Wesleyan University from August 2002 until his retirement in May 2019. He was named President Emeritus of Oklahoma Wesleyan in 2020 and was elected County Commissioner of Osage County Oklahoma in 2022.

== Early life ==
Piper grew up in Hillsdale, Michigan, United States. He earned his B.A. from Spring Arbor University, M.A. from Bowling Green State University, and Ph.D. from Michigan State University.

== Career ==
Piper was Director of Development at Bowling Green State University, before becoming vice president for Advancement at Grace College & Seminary in Indiana. He then served as dean of students at Greenville College in Illinois and then vice president for student development and executive assistant to the president at Spring Arbor University prior to becoming president of Oklahoma Wesleyan University in 2002.

Piper is the host of the podcast The Rebellion, where he tackles major political, theological and educational issues. His articles have been featured on Breakpoint, FOX News, politicalmavens.com and crosswalk.com, as well as other platforms. Piper is a longstanding contributing columnist for The Washington Times. He has appeared as a guest on Fox News, Fox & Friends, The O'Reilly Factor, Tucker Carlson Tonight, Fox's Varney and Co., The Glenn Beck Program, The Dana Loesch Show, The 700 Club with Pat Robertson, CBN News, The Adam Carolla Show, The Andrew Klavan Show, the Dave Rubin Show, and has been featured on NBC Today, as well as NRA TV, CRTV, the Washington Post, and elsewhere. Piper is a frequent radio commentator, appearing on dozens of networks, including Air America, KWON, KYFM, and KFAQ

Piper is the author of the op-ed "This is Not a Daycare, It's a University", in which he criticized cancel culture, micro-aggressions, trigger warnings and students' over-sensitivity to challenging ideas. Piper expressed his belief in the classical liberal arts paradigm where college is intended to challenge rather than coddle students intellectually.

His books include The Wrong Side of the Door: Why Ideas Matter (2009, republished by Camden House Books under the title Why I Am a "Liberal" and Other Conservative Ideas), Not a Day Care: The Devastating Consequences of Abandoning Truth (2017), and Grow Up: Life isn't Safe, but it's Good (2021), the latter two published by Regnery Publishing.

In March 2016, Piper received the Jeane Kirkpatrick Award for Academic Freedom at the Conservative Political Action Conference (CPAC). He was named President Emeritus of Oklahoma Wesleyan University in 2020 and was elected County Commissioner of Osage County Oklahoma in 2022.
