= NSYNC in Concert =

1998–2000 concert tour by NSYNC

- Tour by NSYNC
- Working crew pass for the 1999 tour
- Associated album: 'N Sync
- Start date: June 11, 1998
- End date: January 1, 2000
- Legs: 5
- No. of shows: 209
- Box office: $51.5 million

NSYNC concert chronology
- For the Girl Tour (1997-1999); NSYNC in Concert (1998–2000); No Strings Attached Tour (2000)

NSYNC in Concert (also known as the Second II None Tour, Ain't No Stoppin' Us Now Tour, Boys of Summer Tour and The Winter Shows) is the second concert tour by American boy band, NSYNC. Primarily visiting North America, the tour supported the band's debut studio album, 'N Sync. The trek lasted eighteen months, playing over two hundred concerts in over one hundred cities. In 1998, the tour was nominated for "Best New Artist Tour" by Pollstar Concert Industry Awards. It also became one of the biggest tours in 1999, earning over $50 million. Supporting the band on the tour were newcomers Britney Spears, B*Witched and Mandy Moore along with music veterans Jordan Knight, Shanice and The Sugarhill Gang.

== Background ==
After completing a promotional tour for their debut album, the band announced their first tour in North America. Previously, the band toured Germany for their "For the Girl Tour" in 1997. The summer outing saw the band playing in nightclubs, state fairs and radio music festivals. After the airing of their Disney Channel concert special, “NSYNC: Live in Concert”, the band's popularity grew in the United States and additional dates were added to the tour. Now known as the "Second II None Tour", the band were now playing theatres and auditoriums. Before the tour began in November 1998, the band become the opening act for Janet Jackson's The Velvet Rope Tour during concerts in October 1998.

The "Second II None Tour" leg ended in February 1999, after performing at a radio music festival in San Jose, California. Around this time, band member Lance Bass expressed the band would expand their upcoming tour to the United Kingdom. However, this did not come to fruition. The next leg of the tour, known as "Ain't No Stoppin' Us Now Tour" began in the spring of 1999. The band were now playing arenas in the United States. The tour was sponsored by Oxy Balance. During an interview with the Hartford Courant, band member JC Chasez described the tour as:

"The concerts, yeah, are loud and crazy, and people scream and everything like that but it's fun. It's all in good fun. The core of the show is the same, the same old singing and dancing, NSYNC style: a high-energy, very personal performance".

While performing a concert in New Haven, Connecticut, local radio station WKCI-FM declared March 13, 1999, as "NSYNC Day". While touring in Florida, Bass became ill and missed the concerts in Tampa and Sunrise. The tour was expanded once again to the summer, now called the "Boys of Summer Tour". The band were now playing amphitheatres and stadiums. The shows were sponsored by Clairol Herbal Essences. For the August concert in Denver, the band allowed students of Columbine High School to attend the concert for free. During this time, the band was involved in a legal battle with their former manager Lou Pearlman and transitioning from RCA to Jive Records. Towards the end of the leg, the band were forced to cancel concerts due to schedule conflicts relating to their lawsuit. The group made up the dates in their final tour expansion known as "The Winter Shows". During an AOL chat in November with fans, Chasez stated the group was already planning for their next tour for their upcoming album in 2000. He also expressed hoping to tour the United Kingdom, continental Europe, Australia and Japan. During The Winter Shows, the band performed their new singles, "Bye Bye Bye" and "Music of My Heart". The leg ended with a New Year's Eve concert in Honolulu.

== Personnel ==
=== NSYNC ===
- JC Chasez – Lead Vocals
- Justin Timberlake – Lead Vocals
- Chris Kirkpatrick – Backing Vocals
- Lance Bass – Backing Vocals
- Joey Fatone – Backing Vocals

=== Band ===
Throughout their concerts, the five were accompanied by the following instrumentalists on this tour:

- Kevin Antunes – Music Director, Keyboards
- Troy Antunes – Bass
- Billy Ashbaugh – Drums, Percussion
- Ruben Ruiz – Guitar, Keyboards
- Byron Chambers – Keyboards
- Paul Howards – Saxophone, Percussion, Keyboards

== Opening acts ==
- N-Tyce (Leg 1, select dates)
- Britney Spears (Leg 2)
- Sweetbox (Leg 2, select dates)
- B*Witched (Leg 2 & 3, select dates)
- Divine (Leg 3, select dates)
- Tatyana Ali (Leg 3, select dates)
- Blaque (Leg 3 & 4, select dates)
- Jordan Knight (Leg 4)
- 3rd Storee (Leg 4, select dates)
- Billy Crawford (Leg 4, select dates)
- Raven-Symoné (Leg 4, select dates)
- Five (Leg 4, select dates)
- INOJ (Leg 4, select dates)
- Mandy Moore (Leg 4, select dates)
- Michael Africk (Leg 4, select dates)
- P.Y.T. (Leg 4, select dates)
- Trey D. (Leg 4, select dates)
- Shanice (Leg 4, select dates)
- Sugarhill Gang (Leg 4, select dates)
- Ron Irizarry (Leg 4 & 5, select dates)
- A–Teens (Leg 5, select dates)
- McMaster & James (Leg 5, select dates)
- Wild Orchid (Leg 5, select dates)
- Innosense (Hawaii—December 1999)

== Setlist ==
June 1998—September 1998
1. "Dance Sequence" (contains elements of "The Imperial March" and "Finally")
2. "Crazy for You"
3. "I Just Wanna Be with You"
4. "(God Must Have Spent) A Little More Time on You"
5. "I Want You Back" / "ABC" / "The Love You Save"
6. "Jive Talkin'" / "Too Much Heaven" / "How Deep Is Your Love" / "Stayin' Alive" / "You Should Be Dancing"
7. "Thinking of You (I Drive Myself Crazy)"
8. "Giddy Up"
9. "I Want You Back"
10. "You Got It"
11. "Sailing"
12. "Here We Go"
13. "Tearin' Up My Heart"
November 1998—February 1999
1. "Dance Sequence" (contains elements of "The Imperial March" and "Finally")
2. "Crazy for You"
3. "I Just Wanna Be with You"
4. "Together Again"
5. "(God Must Have Spent) A Little More Time on You"
6. "Video Sequence"
7. "More Than a Feeling"
8. "The Longest Time"
9. "My Girl" / "How Sweet It Is (To Be Loved by You)" / "I Can't Help Myself (Sugar Pie Honey Bunch)"
10. "Thinking of You (I Drive Myself Crazy)"
11. "Instrumental Sequence"
12. "Giddy Up"
13. "I Want You Back"
14. "You Got It"
15. "Sailing"
16. "Riddle"
17. "Here We Go"

Encore

18. "Tearin' Up My Heart"
19. "Forever Young"

Notes

- For concerts in December, the band performed "Merry Christmas, Happy Holidays" in lieu of "Together Again".
- "Together Again" was dropped from the setlist in January.
March 1999—January 2000
1. "Dance Sequence" (contains elements of "Put Your Hands Where My Eyes Could See" and "They Don't Care About Us")
2. "Here We Go"
3. "You Got It"
4. "For the Girl Who Has Everything"
5. "That Thing You Do"
6. "I Want You Back" / "ABC" / "The Love You Save"
7. "Celebration"
8. "Crazy for You"
9. "Thinking of You (I Drive Myself Crazy)"
10. "I Just Wanna Be with You"
11. "(God Must Have Spent) A Little More Time on You"
12. "Bye Bye Bye" (Performed from November 26, 1999 - January 1, 2000)
13. "I Want You Back"

Encore

14. "Sailing"
15. "Tearin' Up My Heart"
16. "Ain't No Stoppin' Us Now"

== Tour dates ==
Date	City	Country	Venue	
NSYNC in Concert
June 11, 1998	Lake Buena Vista	United States	House of Blues	
June 12, 1998	Lake Buena Vista	United States	House of Blues	
June 13, 1998^{[A]}	Anaheim	United States	Edison International Field	
June 19, 1998	Arlington	United States	Music Mill Amphitheater	
June 21, 1998^{[B]}	Burlington	United States	Burlington Memorial Auditorium	
June 27, 1998^{[C]}	Council Bluffs	United States	Westfair Amphitheatre	
June 28, 1998^{[D]}	Tinley Park	United States	New World Music Theatre	
July 4, 1998^{[E]}	St. Petersburg	United States	Straub Park	
July 5, 1998	Vancouver	Canada	Vancouver Forum	
July 6, 1998	Vancouver	Canada	Vancouver Forum	
July 8, 1998	Edmonton	Canada	Assembly Hall	
July 9, 1998	Calgary	Canada	Max Bell Centre	
July 10, 1998	Saskatoon	Canada	Saskatoon Centennial Auditorium	
July 11, 1998	Winnipeg	Canada	Walker Theatre	
July 12, 1998	Thunder Bay	Canada	Thunder Bay Community Auditorium	
July 15, 1998	London	Canada	Centennial Hall	
July 16, 1998	Toronto	Canada	Molson Amphitheatre	
July 18, 1998	Montreal	Canada	Le Spectrum	
July 20, 1998	Ottawa	Canada	Congress Hall	
July 22, 1998^{[F]}	Kingsport	United States Canada	Johnson Stadium	
July 23, 1998	Scranton	United States Canada	Tink's Entertainment Complex	
July 24, 1998	Plainview	United States Canada	The Vanderbilt	
July 25, 1998	Philadelphia	United States Canada	Electric Factory	
July 26, 1998	Washington, D.C.	United States Canada	Warner Theatre	
July 28, 1998	Chicago	United States Canada	House of Blues	
July 29, 1998	Cleveland	United States Canada	Odeon Concert Club	
July 30, 1998	Cleveland	United States Canada	Odeon Concert Club	
July 31, 1998	Royal Oak	United States Canada	Royal Oak Music Theatre	
August 1, 1998	Flint	United States Canada	IMA Sports Arena	
August 2, 1998^{[G]}	Janesville	United States Canada	Rock County Fairgrounds Grandstand	
August 3, 1998^{[H]}	San Jose	United States Canada	Exposition Hall	
August 7, 1998^{[I]}	Kellogg	United States Canada	Silver Mountain Amphitheatre	
August 8, 1998	Ridgefield	United States Canada	Clark County Event Center	
August 11, 1998	Lawrence	United States Canada	Granada Theater	
August 13, 1998^{[J]}	Sioux Falls	United States Canada	Lyon Fairgrounds Grandstand	
August 14, 1998	Toronto	United States Canada	The Lifesavers show	
August 18, 1998^{[K]}	Springfield	United States Canada	Illinois State Fair Grandstand	
August 21, 1998^{[L]}	Dallas	United States Canada	Starplex Amphitheatre	
August 24, 1998^{[M]}	Boise	United States Canada	Expo Idaho	
August 25, 1998	Walker	United States Canada	DeltaPlex Arena	
September 11, 1998^{[N]}	Hutchinson	United States Canada	Kansas State Fair Grandstand	
September 12, 1998	Camden	United States Canada	Blockbuster-Sony Music Entertainment Centre	
September 13, 1998	Salt Lake City	United States Canada	Utah State Fairpark	
September 18, 1998	Dallas	United States Canada	House of Blues	
September 23, 1998^{[O]}	Nashville	United States Canada	Nashville Convention Center	
Second II None Tour				
November 17, 1998	Kissimmee	United States	Tupperware Convention Center Auditorium	Britney Spears Sweetbox
November 18, 1998	Kissimmee	United States	Tupperware Convention Center Auditorium	Britney Spears Sweetbox
November 19, 1998	Tampa	United States	USF Sun Dome	Britney Spears Sweetbox
November 20, 1998^{[P]}	Pompano Beach	United States	Pompano Park	Britney Spears Sweetbox
November 22, 1998	Atlanta	United States	Fox Theatre	Britney Spears Sweetbox
November 24, 1998	Richmond	United States	Landmark Theater	Britney Spears Sweetbox
November 25, 1998	Westbury	United States	Westbury Music Fair	Britney Spears Sweetbox
November 27, 1998	Newark	United States	Prudential Hall	Britney Spears Sweetbox
November 28, 1998	Upper Darby Township	United States	Tower Theater	Britney Spears Sweetbox
November 29, 1998	Albany	United States	Palace Theatre	Britney Spears Sweetbox
November 30, 1998	Cincinnati	United States	Seton High School Theater	Britney Spears Sweetbox
December 1, 1998	Columbus	United States	Franklin County Memorial Hall	Britney Spears Sweetbox
December 2, 1998	Kalamazoo	United States	State Theatre	Britney Spears Sweetbox
December 3, 1998	Indianapolis	United States	Murat Theatre	Britney Spears Sweetbox
December 4, 1998	Cleveland	United States	CSU Convocation Center	Britney Spears Sweetbox
December 5, 1998	Auburn Hills	United States	The Palace of Auburn Hills	Britney Spears Sweetbox
December 8, 1998	Milwaukee	United States	Riverside Theater	Britney Spears Sweetbox
December 9, 1998	St. Louis	United States	American Theater	Britney Spears Sweetbox
December 10, 1998	St. Louis	United States	American Theater	Britney Spears Sweetbox
December 11, 1998	Nashville	United States	Ryman Auditorium	Britney Spears Sweetbox
December 12, 1998	Chattanooga	United States	Soldiers and Sailors Memorial Auditorium	Britney Spears Sweetbox
December 13, 1998	Louisville	United States	Palace Theatre	Britney Spears Sweetbox
December 17, 1998^{[Q]}	New York City	United States	Madison Square Garden	
December 18, 1998^{[Q]}	San Jose	United States	San Jose Arena	
December 27, 1998	Minneapolis	United States	Orpheum Theatre	Britney Spears B*Witched
December 28, 1998	Des Moines	United States	Des Moines Civic Center	Britney Spears B*Witched
December 29, 1998	Kansas City	United States	Memorial Hall	Britney Spears B*Witched
December 30, 1998	Dallas	United States	Bronco Bowl	Britney Spears B*Witched
December 31, 1998	Las Vegas	United States	Thomas & Mack Center	Britney Spears B*Witched
January 1, 1999	Las Vegas	United States	Thomas & Mack Center	Britney Spears B*Witched
January 2, 1999	Phoenix	United States	Celebrity Theatre	Britney Spears B*Witched
January 3, 1999	San Diego	United States	Cox Arena	Britney Spears B*Witched
January 5, 1999	Los Angeles	United States	Universal Amphitheatre	Britney Spears B*Witched
January 8, 1999	Los Angeles	United States	Universal Amphitheatre	Britney Spears B*Witched
January 9, 1999	Sacramento	United States	Sacramento Memorial Auditorium	Britney Spears B*Witched
January 10, 1999	Berkeley	United States	Berkeley Community Theater	Britney Spears B*Witched
January 13, 1999	Denver	United States	McNichols Sports Arena	Britney Spears B*Witched
January 15, 1999	Tulsa	United States	Brady Theater	Britney Spears B*Witched
January 16, 1999	Baton Rouge	United States	Riverside Centroplex Arena	Britney Spears B*Witched
January 17, 1999	Biloxi	United States	Mississippi Coast Coliseum	Britney Spears B*Witched
February 7, 1999^{[R]}	Honolulu	United States	Aloha Stadium	
February 26, 1999^{[S]}	San Jose	United States	San Jose Arena	
Ain't No Stoppin' Us Now Tour				
March 3, 1999	Jacksonville	United States	Jacksonville Coliseum	Tatyana Ali B*Witched
March 5, 1999	Greenville	United States	BI-LO Center	Tatyana Ali B*Witched
March 6, 1999	Chapel Hill	United States	Dean Smith Center	Tatyana Ali B*Witched
March 7, 1999	Charleston	United States	Charleston Civic Center	Tatyana Ali B*Witched
March 8, 1999	Pittsburgh	United States	Civic Arena	Tatyana Ali B*Witched
March 11, 1999	Providence	United States	Providence Civic Center	Tatyana Ali B*Witched
March 12, 1999	Uniondale	United States	Nassau Veterans Memorial Coliseum	Tatyana Ali B*Witched
March 13, 1999	New Haven	United States	New Haven Coliseum	Tatyana Ali B*Witched
March 14, 1999	Toronto	Canada	Maple Leaf Gardens	Tatyana Ali B*Witched
March 15, 1999	Albany	United States	Pepsi Arena	Tatyana Ali B*Witched
March 16, 1999	Boston	United States	FleetCenter	Tatyana Ali B*Witched
March 18, 1999	Philadelphia	United States	First Union Center	B*Witched
March 19, 1999	Washington, D.C.	United States	MCI Center	B*Witched
March 20, 1999	Hampton	United States	Hampton Coliseum	B*Witched
March 21, 1999	Charlotte	United States	Charlotte Coliseum	B*Witched
March 23, 1999	Columbus	United States	Value City Arena	Divine
March 24, 1999	Cleveland	United States	Gund Arena	Divine
March 25, 1999	Auburn Hills	United States	The Palace of Auburn Hills	Divine
March 26, 1999	Rosemont	United States	Rosemont Horizon	Divine
March 27, 1999	Rosemont	United States	Rosemont Horizon	Divine
March 28, 1999	Grand Rapids	United States	Van Andel Arena	Divine
March 30, 1999	Nashville	United States	Gaylord Entertainment Center	Divine
April 1, 1999	Kansas City	United States	Kemper Arena	Divine
April 2, 1999	St. Louis	United States	Kiel Center	Divine
April 3, 1999	Cincinnati	United States	The Crown	Divine
April 6, 1999	Lafayette	United States	Cajundome	Divine
April 7, 1999	Houston	United States	Compaq Center	Divine
April 8, 1999	Dallas	United States	Reunion Arena	Divine
April 9, 1999	Oklahoma City	United States	Myriad Convention Center Arena	Divine
April 10, 1999	Valley Center	United States	Britt Brown Arena	Divine
April 13, 1999	Phoenix	United States	America West Arena	Blaque
April 15, 1999	San Diego	United States	Cox Arena	Blaque
April 16, 1999	Inglewood	United States	Great Western Forum	Blaque
April 17, 1999	Las Vegas	United States	MGM Grand Garden Arena	Blaque
April 18, 1999	Anaheim	United States	Arrowhead Pond of Anaheim	Blaque
April 19, 1999	Oakland	United States	The Arena in Oakland	Blaque
April 22, 1999	Portland	United States	Rose Garden	Blaque
April 23, 1999	Tacoma	United States	Tacoma Dome	Blaque
April 24, 1999	Seattle	United States	KeyArena	Blaque
April 25, 1999	Spokane	United States	Spokane Veterans Memorial Arena	Blaque
April 27, 1999	Nampa	United States	Idaho Center Arena	Blaque
April 28, 1999	Salt Lake City	United States	Delta Center	Blaque
April 30, 1999	Colorado Springs	United States	Colorado Springs World Arena	Blaque
May 2, 1999	Omaha	United States	Omaha Civic Auditorium	Blaque
May 3, 1999	Des Moines	United States	Veterans Memorial Auditorium	Blaque
May 4, 1999	Moline	United States	The MARK of the Quad Cities	Blaque
May 6, 1999	Minneapolis	United States	Target Center	Blaque
May 7, 1999	Madison	United States	Kohl Center	Blaque
May 8, 1999	Milwaukee	United States	Wisconsin Center Arena	Blaque
May 9, 1999	Louisville	United States	Freedom Hall	Blaque
May 10, 1999	Knoxville	United States	Thompson–Boling Arena	Blaque
May 12, 1999^{[T]}	Bay Lake	United States	Hollywood Boulevard	Blaque
May 13, 1999	Orlando	United States	Orlando Arena	Blaque
May 14, 1999	Tampa	United States	Ice Palace	Blaque
May 15, 1999	Sunrise	United States	National Car Rental Center	Blaque
May 16, 1999	West Palm Beach	United States	Coral Sky Amphitheater	Blaque
May 18, 1999	Sunrise	United States	National Car Rental Center	Blaque
May 29, 1999^{[C]}	Council Bluffs	United States	Westfair Amphitheatre	
June 5, 1999^{[U]}	Mansfield	United States	Great Woods Center for the Performing Arts	
June 19, 1999^{[D]}	Joliet	United States	Route 66 Raceway	
Boys of Summer Tour				
July 2, 1999	Sunrise	United States	National Car Rental Center	
July 5, 1999	Virginia Beach	United States	GTE Virginia Beach Amphitheater	Blaque; P.Y.T. Mandy Moore; The Sugarhill Gang
July 6, 1999	Virginia Beach	United States	GTE Virginia Beach Amphitheater	Blaque; P.Y.T. Mandy Moore; The Sugarhill Gang
July 7, 1999	Virginia Beach	United States	GTE Virginia Beach Amphitheater	Blaque; P.Y.T. Mandy Moore; The Sugarhill Gang
July 8, 1999	Camden	United States	Blockbuster-Sony Music Entertainment Centre	Jordan Knight; The Sugarhill Gang
July 9, 1999	Camden	United States	Blockbuster-Sony Music Entertainment Centre	Jordan Knight; The Sugarhill Gang
July 10, 1999	Burgettstown	United States	Coca-Cola Star Lake Amphitheater	Blaque; P.Y.T. Mandy Moore; Jordan Knight; The Sugarhill Gang
July 11, 1999	Burgettstown	United States	Coca-Cola Star Lake Amphitheater	Blaque; P.Y.T. Mandy Moore; Jordan Knight; The Sugarhill Gang
July 13, 1999	Wantagh	United States	Jones Beach Amphitheater	P.Y.T. Mandy Moore; Jordan Knight; The Sugarhill Gang
July 14, 1999	Wantagh	United States	Jones Beach Amphitheater	P.Y.T. Mandy Moore; Jordan Knight; The Sugarhill Gang
July 15, 1999	Wantagh	United States	Jones Beach Amphitheater	P.Y.T. Mandy Moore; Jordan Knight; The Sugarhill Gang
July 16, 1999	Wantagh	United States	Jones Beach Amphitheater	P.Y.T. Mandy Moore; Jordan Knight; The Sugarhill Gang
July 17, 1999	Holmdel	United States	PNC Bank Arts Center	P.Y.T. Mandy Moore; Jordan Knight; The Sugarhill Gang
July 18, 1999	Holmdel	United States	PNC Bank Arts Center	P.Y.T. Mandy Moore; Jordan Knight; The Sugarhill Gang
July 20, 1999	Darien	United States	Darien Lake Performing Arts Center	P.Y.T. Mandy Moore; Jordan Knight; The Sugarhill Gang
July 22, 1999	Scranton	United States	Montage Mountain Performing Arts Center	P.Y.T. Mandy Moore; Jordan Knight; The Sugarhill Gang
July 23, 1999	Hershey	United States	Hersheypark Stadium	P.Y.T. Mandy Moore; Jordan Knight; The Sugarhill Gang
July 24, 1999	Mansfield	United States	Tweeter Center for the Performing Arts	P.Y.T. Mandy Moore; Jordan Knight; The Sugarhill Gang
July 25, 1999	Mansfield	United States	Tweeter Center for the Performing Arts	P.Y.T. Mandy Moore; Jordan Knight; The Sugarhill Gang
July 27, 1999	Hartford	United States	Meadows Music Theatre	P.Y.T. Mandy Moore; Jordan Knight; Billy Crawford; INOJ; The Sugarhill Gang
July 28, 1999	Bristow	United States	Nissan Pavilion	P.Y.T. Mandy Moore; Jordan Knight; Billy Crawford; INOJ; The Sugarhill Gang
July 29, 1999	Columbus	United States	Polaris Amphitheater	P.Y.T. Mandy Moore; Jordan Knight; Billy Crawford; INOJ; The Sugarhill Gang
July 31, 1999	Pontiac	United States	Pontiac Silverdome	P.Y.T. Mandy Moore; Jordan Knight; Billy Crawford; INOJ; The Sugarhill Gang
August 2, 1999	Noblesville	United States	Deer Creek Music Center	P.Y.T. Mandy Moore; Jordan Knight; Billy Crawford; INOJ; The Sugarhill Gang; Shanice
August 4, 1999	Nashville	United States	First American Music Center	Mandy Moore; Jordan Knight; Billy Crawford; INOJ; The Sugarhill Gang; Shanice; Ron Izzary
August 5, 1999	Maryland Heights	United States	Riverport Amphitheatre	Mandy Moore; Jordan Knight; Billy Crawford; INOJ; The Sugarhill Gang; Shanice; Ron Izzary
August 6, 1999	Rosemont	United States	Rosemont Horizon	Mandy Moore; Jordan Knight; Billy Crawford; INOJ; The Sugarhill Gang; Shanice; Ron Izzary
August 7, 1999	Rosemont	United States	Rosemont Horizon	Mandy Moore; Jordan Knight; Billy Crawford; INOJ; The Sugarhill Gang; Shanice; Ron Izzary
August 8, 1999	Milwaukee	United States	Marcus Amphitheater	Mandy Moore; Jordan Knight; Billy Crawford; INOJ; The Sugarhill Gang; Shanice; Ron Izzary
August 9, 1999	Los Angeles^{[V]}	United States	Universal Amphitheatre	
August 9, 1999	Chula Vista^{[W]}	United States	Coors Amphitheatre	
August 10, 1999	Bonner Springs	United States	Sandstone Amphitheater	Mandy Moore Jordan Knight Billy Crawford INOJ The Sugarhill Gang Shanice Ron Izzary
August 12, 1999	New Orleans	United States	Louisiana Superdome	Mandy Moore Jordan Knight Billy Crawford INOJ The Sugarhill Gang Shanice Ron Izzary 3rd Storee
August 13, 1999	The Woodlands	United States	Cynthia Woods Mitchell Pavilion	Mandy Moore Jordan Knight Billy Crawford INOJ The Sugarhill Gang Shanice Ron Izzary 3rd Storee
August 14, 1999	Irving	United States	Texas Stadium	Mandy Moore Jordan Knight Billy Crawford INOJ The Sugarhill Gang Shanice Ron Izzary 3rd Storee
August 16, 1999	San Antonio	United States	Alamodome	Mandy Moore Jordan Knight Billy Crawford INOJ The Sugarhill Gang Shanice Ron Izzary 3rd Storee
August 18, 1999	Phoenix	United States	Blockbuster Desert Sky Pavilion	Mandy Moore Jordan Knight Billy Crawford INOJ The Sugarhill Gang Shanice Ron Izzary 3rd Storee
August 19, 1999	Irvine	United States	Irvine Meadows Amphitheatre	Mandy Moore Jordan Knight Billy Crawford INOJ The Sugarhill Gang Shanice Ron Izzary 3rd Storee
August 20, 1999	San Bernardino	United States	Blockbuster Pavilion	Shanice 3rd Storee Jordan Knight
August 21, 1999	Mountain View	United States	Shoreline Amphitheatre	Mandy Moore Jordan Knight Billy Crawford INOJ The Sugarhill Gang Shanice Ron Izzary 3rd Storee
August 23, 1999	Denver	United States	McNichols Sports Arena	Mandy Moore Jordan Knight Billy Crawford INOJ The Sugarhill Gang Shanice Ron Izzary 3rd Storee
August 26, 1999	Atlanta	United States	Coca-Cola Lakewood Amphitheatre	Mandy Moore Jordan Knight Billy Crawford INOJ The Sugarhill Gang Shanice Ron Izzary 3rd Storee
August 27, 1999	Atlanta	United States	Coca-Cola Lakewood Amphitheatre	Mandy Moore Jordan Knight Billy Crawford INOJ The Sugarhill Gang Shanice Ron Izzary 3rd Storee
August 28, 1999	Charlotte	United States	Blockbuster Pavilion	Mandy Moore Jordan Knight Billy Crawford INOJ The Sugarhill Gang Ron Izzary 3rd Storee
August 29, 1999	Raleigh	United States	Alltel Pavilion	Mandy Moore Jordan Knight Billy Crawford INOJ The Sugarhill Gang Ron Izzary 3rd Storee
August 31, 1999	Jackson	United States	Mississippi Coliseum	Mandy Moore The Sugarhill Gang Ron Izzary 3rd Storee
September 1, 1999	Memphis	United States	Pyramid Arena	Mandy Moore The Sugarhill Gang Ron Izzary 3rd Storee
September 2, 1999	Cincinnati	United States	Riverbend Music Center	Mandy Moore The Sugarhill Gang Ron Izzary 3rd Storee
September 3, 1999	Cuyahoga Falls	United States	Blossom Music Center	Mandy Moore The Sugarhill Gang Ron Izzary 3rd Storee
September 4, 1999	Toronto	Canada	Molson Amphitheatre	Mandy Moore The Sugarhill Gang Ron Izzary 3rd Storee
The Winter Shows				
November 26, 1999	Las Vegas	United States	MGM Grand Garden Arena	Wild Orchid A-Teens
November 27, 1999	Las Vegas	United States	MGM Grand Garden Arena	Wild Orchid A-Teens
November 28, 1999	Reno	United States	Lawlor Events Center	Wild Orchid A-Teens
November 29, 1999	Oakland	United States	The Arena in Oakland	Wild Orchid A-Teens
November 30, 1999	Sacramento	United States	ARCO Arena	Wild Orchid A-Teens
December 3, 1999	Fargo	United States	Fargodome	Wild Orchid A-Teens
December 4, 1999	Winnipeg	Canada	Winnipeg Arena	A-Teens
December 7, 1999	Calgary	Canada	Canadian Airlines Saddledome	A-Teens
December 8, 1999	Edmonton	Canada	Skyreach Centre	A-Teens
December 30, 1999	Honolulu	United States	Blaisdell Arena	Innosense
December 31, 1999	Honolulu	United States	Blaisdell Arena	Innosense
January 1, 2000	Honolulu	United States	Blaisdell Arena	Innosense

Music festivals and other miscellaneous performances

^{A} This concert was a part of "Wango Tango"
^{B} This concert was a part of the "Burlington Steamboat Days"
^{C} These concerts were a part of "Sweetstock"
^{D} These concerts were a part of the "B96 SummerBash"
^{E} This concert was a part of the "Waterfront Festival"
^{F} This concert was a part of "FunFest"
^{G} This concert was a part of the "Rock County 4-H Fair"
^{H} This concert was a part of the "Santa Clara County Fair"
^{I} This concert was a part of the "Clark County Fair"
^{J} This concert was a part of the "Sioux Empire Fair"
^{K} This concert was a part of the "Illinois State Fair"
^{L} This concert was a part of "Kissfest"
^{M} This concert was a part of the "Western Idaho Fair"
^{N} This concert was a part of the "Kansas State Fair"
^{O} This concert was a part of the "Kmart Convention"
^{P} This concert was a part of the "Broward County Fair"
^{Q} This concert was a part of the "Jingle Ball"
^{R} This concert was a part of the "Pro Bowl"
^{S} This concert was a part of the "Skool Spirit Jam"
^{T} This concert was a part of "Disney's Summer Jam"
^{U} This concert was a part of the "KISS Concert"
^{V} This concert was a part of "Teenapalooza"
^{W} This concert was a part of the "Summer Music Mania"

Cancellations and rescheduled shows

July 19, 1998	Quebec City, Canada	Salle Albert-Rousseau	Cancelled
March 9, 1999	Toronto, Canada	Maple Leaf Gardens	Rescheduled to March 14, 1999
May 9, 1999	Louisville, Kentucky	Louisville Gardens	Moved to Freedom Hall
January 13, 1999	Denver, Colorado	Mammoth Events Center	Moved to McNichols Sports Arena
July 8, 1999	Bristow, Virginia	Nissan Pavilion	Rescheduled to July 28, 1999
July 28, 1999	Columbus, Ohio	Polaris Amphitheater	Rescheduled to July 29, 1999
July 29, 1999	Cincinnati, Ohio	Riverbend Music Center	Rescheduled to September 2, 1999
August 2, 1999	Noblesville, Indiana	Deer Creek Music Center	Rescheduled to Aug 2, 1999
August 20, 1999	Mountain View, California	Shoreline Amphitheatre	Rescheduled to August 21, 1999
August 21, 1999	Concord, California	Concord Pavilion	Rescheduled to September 15, 1999
August 24, 1999	Morrison, Colorado	Red Rocks Amphitheatre	Rescheduled to August 23, 1999, and moved to the McNichols Sports Arena in Denver, Colorado
August 26, 1999	Memphis, Tennessee	Pyramid Arena	Rescheduled to September 1, 1999
September 5, 1999	Montreal, Canada	Molson Centre	Cancelled
September 7, 1999	Winnipeg, Canada	Winnipeg Arena	Rescheduled to December 4, 1999
September 10, 1999	Edmonton, Canada	Skyreach Centre	Rescheduled to December 8, 1999
September 11, 1999	Calgary, Canada	Canadian Airlines Saddledome	Reschedules to December 7, 1999
September 14, 1999	Sacramento, California	ARCO Arena	Rescheduled to November 30, 1999
September 15, 1999	Concord, California	Concord Pavilion	Rescheduled to November 29, 1999, and moved to The Arena in Oakland in Oakland, California
September 16, 1999	Reno, Nevada	Lawlor Events Center	Rescheduled to November 28, 1999
September 17, 1999	Las Vegas, Nevada	MGM Grand Garden Arena	Rescheduled to November 26, 1999
September 18, 1999	Las Vegas, Nevada	MGM Grand Garden Arena	Rescheduled to November 27, 1999

=== Box office score data ===
Venue	City	Tickets sold / available	Gross revenue
Landmark Theater	Richmond	3,383 / 3,383 (100%)	$76,118
Westbury Music Fair	Westbury	2,870 / 2,870 (100%)	$75,557
Tower Theater	Upper Darby Township	2,971 / 2,971 (100%)	$74,275
The Palace of Auburn Hills	Auburn Hills	15,475 / 15,475 (100%)	$379,138
Soldiers and Sailors Memorial Auditorium	Chattanooga	3,749 / 3,749 (100%)	$90,500
Palace Theatre	Louisville	2,703 / 2,703 (100%)	$64,250
Orpheum Theatre	Minneapolis	2,435 / 2,435 (100%)	$52,764
Civic Center of Greater Des Moines	Des Moines	2,643 / 2,643 (100%)	$59,468
Thomas & Mack Center	Las Vegas	11,886 / 12,072 (99%)	$325,464
Cox Arena	San Diego	7,241 / 7,241 (100%)	$144,820
Universal Amphitheatre	Los Angeles	12,365 / 12,365 (100%)	$297,330
Sacramento Memorial Auditorium	Sacramento	3,529 / 3,529 (100%)	$79,903
Berkeley Community Theatre	Berkeley	3,265 / 3,265 (100%)	$73,533
McNichols Sports Arena	Denver	10,793 / 10,793 (100%)	$260,170
Riverside Centroplex Arena	Baton Rouge	8,799 / 8,799 (100%)	$233,174
Mississippi Coast Coliseum	Biloxi	10,336 / 10,336 (100%)	$273,904
Civic Arena	Pittsburgh	13,802 / 13,802 (100%)	$392,981
Nassau Veterans Memorial Coliseum	Uniondale	15,937 / 15,937 (100%)	$480,954
Pepsi Arena	Albany	13,855 / 13,855 (100%)	$367,450
First Union Center	Philadelphia	15,950 / 15,950 (100%)	$454,575
Rosemont Horizon	Rosemont	27,954 / 27,954 (100%)	$876,350
The Arena in Oakland	Oakland	14,115 / 14,115 (100%)	$435,055
Freedom Hall	Louisville	16,655 / 16,655 (100%)	$435,575
Thompson–Boling Arena	Knoxville	14,833 / 14,833 (100%)	$450,835
Ice Palace	Tampa	18,333 / 18,333 (100%)	$555,175
Blockbuster-Sony Music Entertainment Centre	Camden	44,861 / 49,858 (90%)	$1,241,327
Coca-Cola Star Lake Amphitheater	Burgettstown	45,598 / 45,598 (100%)	$1,274,727
Jones Beach Amphitheater	Wantagh	57,193 / 57,193 (100%)	$1,921,763
PNC Bank Arts Center	Holmdel Township	34,064 / 34,064 (100%)	$1,011,078
Hersheypark Stadium	Hershey	27,910 / 27,910 (100%)	$922,373
Pontiac Silverdome	Pontiac	48,163 / 55,626 (86%)	$1,528,735
Louisiana Superdome	New Orleans	38,599 / 38,599 (100%)	$1,254,468
Texas Stadium	Irving	35,059 / 37,288 (94%)	$1,282,429
Alamodome	San Antonio	25,078 / 25,230 (99%)	$716,650
TOTAL		550,252 / 565,093 (97%)	$16,667,078

== Broadcasts and recordings ==
The band's performance at Disney's "Summer Jam" was filmed on May 12, 1999, and aired on ABC in June. Their performances at "Summer Music Mania" and "Teenapolooza" were aired on UPN on August 31, 1999. The July 2 performance at the National Car Rental Center was filmed was for a PPV special entitled, "'NSYNC 'N Concert". The concert was presented by WAM! America's Kidz Network and was made available on September 11, 1999.

== Critical reception ==
Overall, the tour received positive elucidation from music critics and concertgoers. Gord Westmacott of the London Free Press wrote the boy band threw their female fans into a frenzy at the Centennial Hall in London, Ontario. He continued: "All five returned to the stage for an a cappella medley of Bee Gees' songs, including 'Jive Talking' and 'How Deep Is Your Love', a move which seemed to win points with the parents and proved that yes, they really can sing. But it was the up-tempo material that drew the best response, as the members bounced around the stage in tightly choreographed dance routines, proving that they can dance too—or at least strut really well. And there was no question they knew exactly how to play the crowd, providing just enough pelvic thrusts amid the ernest and squeaky-clean production".

Kieran Grant of the Toronto Sun enjoyed the performance at the Molson Amphitheatre. He said, "Imagine the fever pitch when their helmets were dropped to reveal heart-throbs JC, Justin, Joey, Chris, and Lance—NSYNC in the flesh. Of course, there was still a heavy layer of Gortex—gloves included—to come off as the track-suited NSYNC strutted about to tunes from their self-titled debut album. The group delighted their fans with their fluid and casual dance moves, hootin' and hollerin' and just-this-side-of-bad-boy posturing". Mike Ross of Music Express called the performance at Skyreach Centre a "fusion of a rock 'n roll concert and a visit to Disneyland. He explained, "The crowd was on its feet—screaming, screaming, all that screaming ... There was actually something to scream about. Say what you want about boy-groups with millions of dollars in production at their disposal. They may be pinnacle of pop fluff, but they're not putting on boring concerts".
