= WJKN =

WJKN may refer to:

- WJKN (AM), a radio station (1510 AM) licensed to Jackson, Michigan, United States
- WJKN-FM, a radio station (89.3 FM) licensed to Spring Arbor, Michigan, United States
