= Annie Davis =

American singer-songwriter

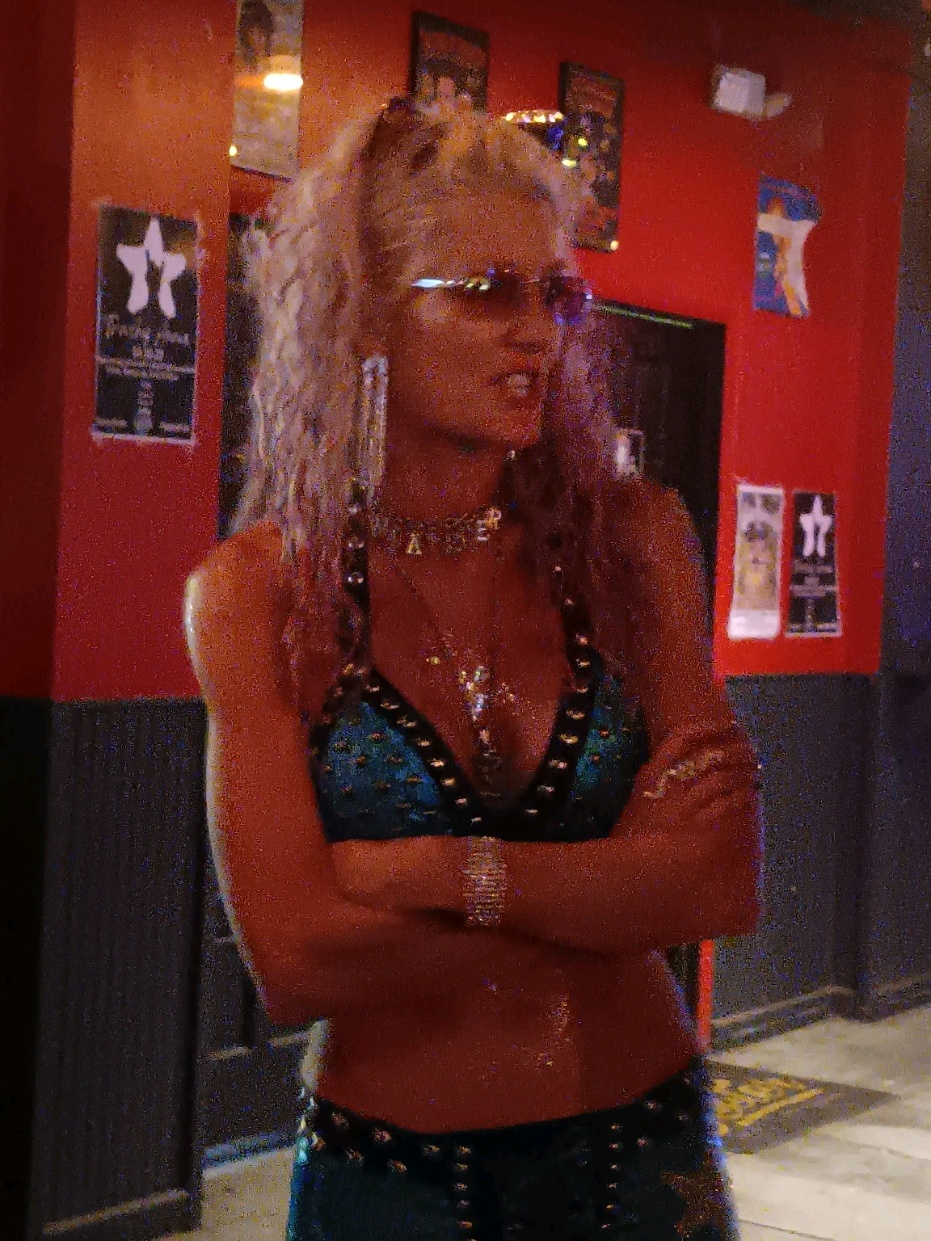
- Annie Davis at a gig in Flagstaff, AZ
- Born: Kimberly Anne Mullen; February 14, 1976 (age 50); Texas, U.S.
- Education: Portland State University
- Occupations: Singer-songwriter; Doctor; Business owner; Reality TV contestant
- Years active: 2020–present
- Television: Survivor 49
- Musical career
- Origin: Austin, Texas
- Genres: Country rock; Alt-country; Americana
- Instruments: Trumpet; Guitar; Vocals
- Label: Cleopatra Records
- Member of: Trashy Annie
- Spouse: Jonathan Daniel Davis (m. 2014)
- Awards: 2023 Americana Artist of the Year, Texas CMA Awards

Kimberly "Annie" Anne Davis (née Mullen) is an American singer-songwriter and the lead singer of the Austin-based band Trashy Annie. In 2025, she participated in Survivor 49, the 49th season of the American reality-TV competition series Survivor.

== Early life ==
Kimberly Mullen was born in Texas, and grew up in Washington State and Portland, Oregon. Her parents divorced when she was young. As a child, Mullen learned to play the trumpet during summer vacation. Later on in her teen years, she worked as a spotlight operator for shows put on at the Clark County Fair in Ridgefield, Washington. After finishing high school, she attended Portland State University, where she earned a degree in Biology.

In 2014, she married Jonathan Daniel Davis. Six years later, at the age of 44, she taught herself to play guitar and recorded her first single, "Runnin'", releasing it under the name Annie Davis.

== Trashy Annie ==
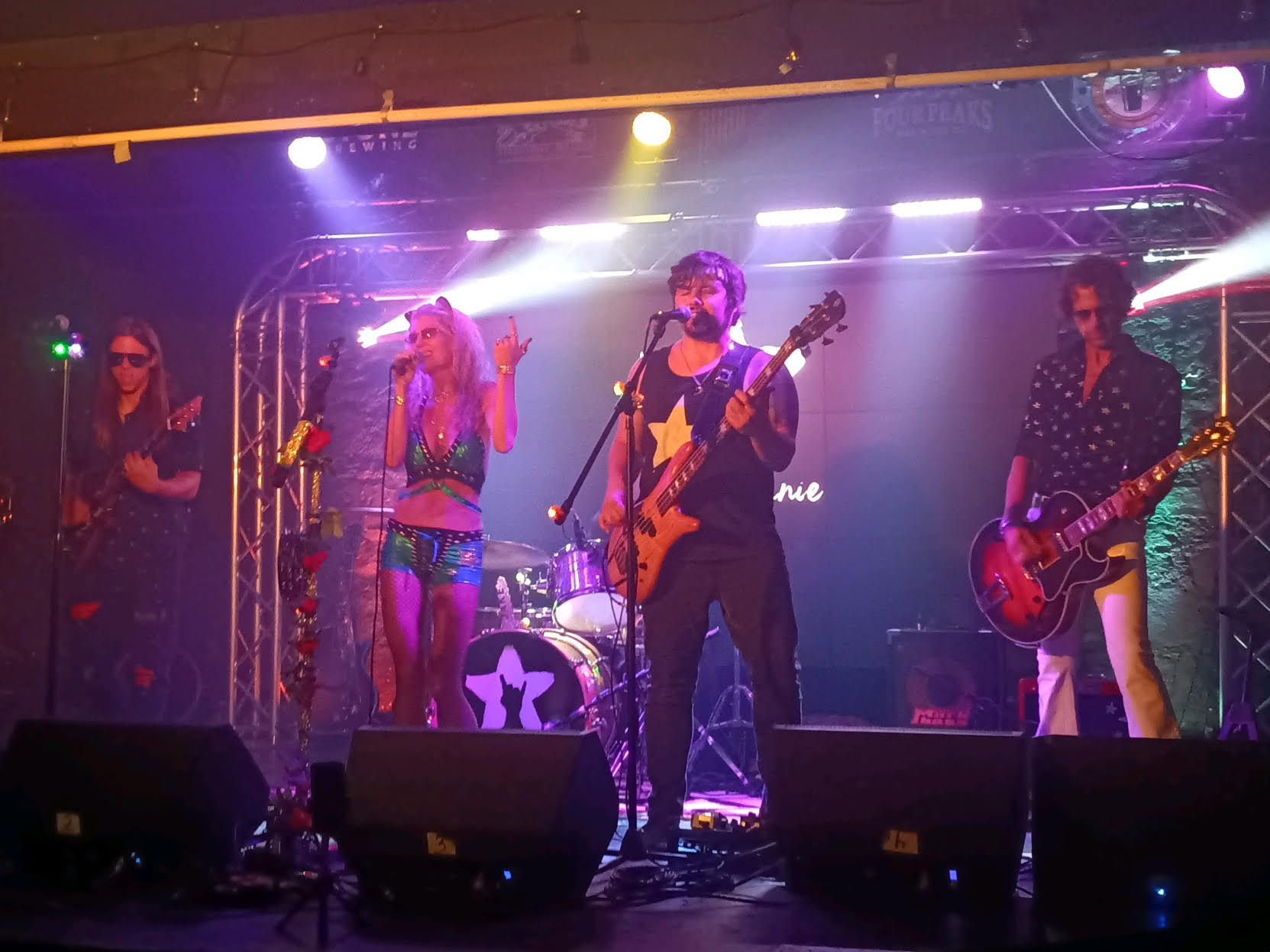
Annie Davis performing with Trashy Annie

In 2021, Davis formed the band Trashy Annie, for whom she has performed vocals and rhythm guitar. She and her band have collaborated with musicians from acts such as Joan Jett, Billy Idol, The Wallflowers, Faith Hill, and Trace Adkins. In 2023, she accepted the Texas Country Music Association Award for Americana Artist of the Year. That same year, Trashy Annie was signed to its first label, Cleopatra Records.

Davis cites musical artists N.W.A, Ruston Kelly, Patty Griffin, The Rolling Stones, Queen, and Joan Jett as her favorite influences. Her own musical style mixes elements of country with punk rock.

== Other ventures ==
Davis also owns a business called RunLab, which helps athletic runners prevent or heal injuries. She is also a chiropractor and EMT.

In 2025, Davis was announced as one of the 18 castaways on Survivor 49, the 49th overall season of Survivor. She was eliminated on Day Five, finishing 17th place overall.

== See also ==
- Survivor 49
