= WEGB =

- Napeague, New York; United States
- Broadcast area: Eastern Long Island
- Frequency: 90.7 MHz
- Branding: Faith FM

Programming
- Language: English
- Format: Christian radio

Ownership
- Owner: Community Bible Church
- Sister stations: WEGQ

History
- First air date: October 6, 2011
- Former call signs: KCBE (2008–2009)
- Call sign meaning: "East Gate Broadcasting"

Technical information
- Licensing authority: FCC
- Facility ID: 173215
- Class: A
- ERP: 4,600 watts
- HAAT: 80 meters (260 ft)
- Transmitter coordinates: 41°01′56″N 71°58′30″W
- Translator: 93.3 W227AN (Southampton)
- Repeater: 91.7 WEGQ (Quogue)

Links
- Public license information: Public file; LMS
- Webcast: Listen live
- Website: hamptonschristian.com

WEGB (90.7 FM, "Faith FM") is a radio station licensed to Napeague, New York and serves eastern Long Island. It broadcasts a Christian radio format and is under ownership of the Community Bible Church.

The station was assigned the current WEGB call letters by the Federal Communications Commission on February 13, 2009 and began broadcasting on October 6, 2011.

== Simulcasts ==
WEGB's programming is simulcast on 91.7 FM WEGQ which broadcasts from Quogue, New York, and a translator, W227AN (93.3 FM) in Southampton, New York.

Call sign	Frequency	City of license	FID	ERP (W)	Height (m (ft))	Class	Transmitter coordinates	FCC info
WEGQ	91.7 FM	Quogue, New York	173219	1,650	93 m (305 ft)	A	40°53′7.4″N 72°41′32.4″W	LMS

Broadcast translator for WEGB
Call sign	Frequency	City of license	FID	FCC info
W227AN	93.3 FM	Southampton, New York	139392	LMS

== Former callsign ==
For unclear reasons, the Federal Communications Commission (FCC) unusually granted the station's initial Construction Permit a "K" call sign of KCBE on October 23, 2008. Since 1923, FCC policy has been to grant call signs beginning with a "K" to stations with a community of license west of the Mississippi River. Most other stations east of the Mississippi beginning with a "K", including KYW in Philadelphia and KDKA in Pittsburgh, date back to previous policy that assigned all land stations "K" call signs. The FCC has also granted improper "K" call signs due to clerical errors, most notably KTGG in Spring Arbor, Michigan.
