= KRIG-FM =

Radio station in Nowata, Oklahoma

- Nowata, Oklahoma; United States
- Broadcast area: Bartlesville, Oklahoma
- Frequency: 104.9 MHz (HD Radio)
- Branding: KRIG 104-9

Programming
- Format: Country music

Ownership
- Owner: KCD Enterprises, Inc.
- Sister stations: KPGM, KWON, KYFM

Technical information
- Licensing authority: FCC
- Facility ID: 35535
- Class: C3
- ERP: 8,300 watts
- HAAT: 172 meters (564 ft)
- Transmitter coordinates: 36°43′38.1″N 95°46′18.9″W

Links
- Public license information: Public file; LMS
- Webcast: Listen Live
- Website: KRIG-FM's website

KRIG-FM 104.9 FM is a radio station licensed to Nowata, Oklahoma. It broadcasts a country music radio format and is owned by KCD Enterprises, Inc.
