= WJKN-FM =

Coordinates: 42.154°N 84.549°W

- Spring Arbor, Michigan; United States
- Broadcast area: Jackson, Michigan
- Frequency: 89.3 MHz
- Branding: Strong Tower Radio

Programming
- Format: Christian preaching

Ownership
- Owner: Spring Arbor University

History
- First air date: March 2005
- Call sign meaning: FM sister to WJKN

Technical information
- Licensing authority: FCC
- Facility ID: 91139
- Class: A
- ERP: 2,500 watts vertical polarization only
- HAAT: 83 meters (272 ft)
- Translator: see below

Links
- Public license information: Public file; LMS
- Webcast: Listen live
- Website: strongtowerradio.org

WJKN-FM (89.3 FM, "Strong Tower Radio") is a non-commercial radio station located in Spring Arbor, Michigan. The station is owned by Spring Arbor University, a religious university associated with the Free Methodist Church.

WJKN-FM began broadcasting in 2005 and took over the Power Praise FM format that had been on sister station WSAE. Power Praise FM was renamed "The Vibe" on 89.3 and was evolved from Christian Hot AC into Christian Hit Radio, featuring Christian rock and hip-hop artists mixed in with the Christian pop artists played on Power Praise FM. Like Power Praise FM, The Vibe also featured an air staff of Spring Arbor University students.

In September 2008, WJKN-FM dropped the "Vibe" format and relaunched as 89.3 The Message, featuring a combination of adult-contemporary Christian music and teaching similar to competing station WUFN.

In December 2014, the "Message" format was moved to sister station KTGG 1540 AM and WJKN became a full-time simulcast of WSAE's "HOME.fm" format. WJKN-FM, however, continued to carry hourly newscasts from the Salem Radio Network, which were not heard over WSAE.

On September 21, 2020, WJKN-FM split from its simulcast with WSAE and changed their format to contemporary Christian, branded as "89.3 The Arbor". All of the translator frequencies in the "Home.FM" network were flipped to "The Arbor", leaving WSAE 106.9 FM as the only remaining "Home.FM" station. In a nod to the old Power Praise FM, "The Arbor" is hosted by Spring Arbor students. The station also breaks from its normal Christian Hot AC format for a two-hour block of Christian Hip-Hop and Rhythmic music called "Breakaway," airing weeknights at 8pm.

On May 3, 2022, the station rebranded as "The Arbor FM".

On October 8, 2026, WJKN-FM moved the programming of "The Arbor" to WSAE, being replaced by Strong Tower Radio. Its translators were also impacted, bringing that network to more than 20 signals across northern and western Michigan and central Illinois.

== WJKN-FM (Strong Tower Radio)'s translators ==
- W222BB 92.3 FM Battle Creek
- W252BA 98.3 FM Chelsea
- W246AU 97.1 FM Coldwater
- W300CO 107.9 FM Dexter/Ann Arbor
- W269CS 101.7 FM Galesburg
- W252CN 98.3 FM Lansing
- W258AH 99.5 FM Kalamazoo
