= Micah Lancaster =

American basketball player and trainer (born 1984)

Personal information
- Born: February 20, 1984 (age 42)
- Listed height: 5 ft 9 in (1.75 m)
- Listed weight: 160 lb (73 kg)

Career information
- High school: Comstock Park (Comstock Park, Michigan)
- College: Spring Arbor (2002–2006)
- NBA draft: 2006: undrafted
- Position: Guard

Career history
- 2007: Grand Rapids Flight

Career highlights
- IBL All-Star; 3-time All-American; 4-time All-Conference; Conference Rookie of the Year

Micah Lancaster (born February 20, 1984) is an American former professional basketball player and current sports trainer, specializing in basketball skill development.

== High school career ==
Lancaster began his Comstock Park High School basketball career as a 4 ft 11 in (1.50 m) freshman on junior varsity. As a 5 ft 2 in (1.57 m) sophomore, Lancaster played in one varsity game. As a junior, during his first varsity game, Lancaster suffered a left knee meniscus tear, which caused difficulties through the remainder of the season.

As a 5 ft 5 in (1.65 m) all-state senior, he led his team to state class B Michigan semi-finals while averaging 30 points per game in the state tourney. In the state tournament game against East Grand Rapids Lancaster scored 45 points including the game-winning shot at the buzzer.

== College and professional career ==
After accepting a scholarship to Spring Arbor University, Lancaster became a NAIA Division II All-American for three years. Lancaster is the second all-time Spring Arbor points leader with 2398 and the Spring Arbor all-time assists leader with 751. Lancaster also holds the Spring Arbor record for the most free throws attempted. Lancaster was selected all-conference in his freshman season and was named as Wolverine Hoosier Athletic Conference rookie of the year. Lancaster led the conference in scoring and assists achieving 1st team all-conference as sophomore. As a junior, Lancaster was awarded first team all-conference in the Midwest Collegiate Conference where he led in scoring and assists. Senior year Lancaster was named first-team all-conference with career-high point game totals of 42 and 41. From 2005 to 2006, Lancaster led Spring Arbor to back to back National Christian College Athletic Association men's basketball champions.

In 2007, Lancaster played professionally for Grand Rapids Flight in the International Basketball League.

== Training system ==
In 2009, Lancaster founded I'm Possible Training to provide intensive, organized basketball skill training. Lancaster's online and in-person basketball curriculum utilizes innovative tools to keep players accountable for whatever real skill they’re working on to make basketball training more game like and realistic, such as rip cones, med balls, and foam rollers. I'm Possible Training is implemented via basketball camps, training academies, clinics, and private training at centers across the United States with certified trainers teaching Lancaster's basketball curriculum.

Lancaster has worked with players at all levels including Kobe Bryant for an event with the London School of Basketball, Dwyane Wade, Mario Chalmers, Kyrie Irving, Evan Turner, Jeff Green, Avery Bradley, and Nolan Smith. Most recently Lancaster has trained NBA players including Normon Powell, Cedi Osman, O.G. Anunoby, Malcolm Brogdon, Marcus Morris Sr., T.J. McConnell, Furkan Korkmaz as well as NBA All-Stars Karl-Anthony Towns, Brandon Ingram and Victor Oladipo.

Lancaster's basketball skill drills were featured in Adam Sandler's film Hustle.
