= Sun Mingming =

Chinese basketball player & actor

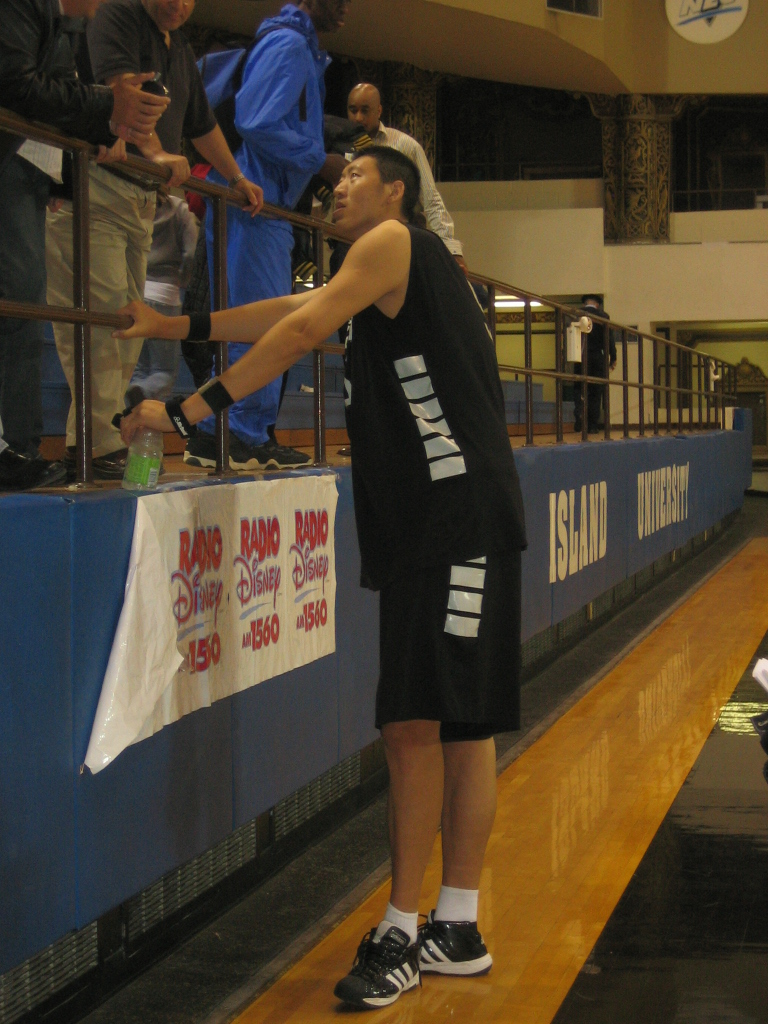
- Sun in 2006

Personal information
- Born: August 23, 1983 (age 43) Bayan County, Heilongjiang, China
- Listed height: 2.36 m (7 ft 9 in)
- Listed weight: 168 kg (370 lb)

Career information
- College: Ventura College (2005–2006)
- NBA draft: 2005: undrafted
- Playing career: 2006–2012
- Position: Center

Career history
- 2006: Dodge City Legend
- 2007: Maryland Nighthawks
- 2007: Grand Rapids Flight
- 2007: Fuerza Regia
- 2008: Grand Rapids Flight
- 2008–2009: Hamamatsu Phoenix
- 2009–2012: Beijing Ducks

Sun Mingming (Chinese: 孙明明; pinyin: Sūn Míngmíng, born August 23, 1983) is a Chinese former professional basketball player. He was the tallest professional basketball player in the world and was measured by the Guinness World Records as 2.36 m (7 ft 9 in) tall and weighing 168 kg (370 lb).

== Early life ==
He was born in a small town near Bayan County, Harbin in Heilongjiang Province, China. He has two siblings: a brother and a sister. He did not begin playing basketball until he was 15 years old.

== College career ==
Sun attended and played basketball at Ventura College, a community college in Ventura, CA. He played basketball there for only the 2005–2006 season, before moving on to play professional basketball.

== Basketball career ==
=== United States ===
Sun played with several American minor league teams, including the USBL team Dodge City Legend, the ABA team Maryland Nighthawks, and the IBL team Grand Rapids Flight. He was also drafted by the Harlem Globetrotters in 2007, being the tallest player in their history to be drafted by them, although he would never play for them.

=== Mexico and Japan ===
Later, Sun played in the Mexican league with Fuerza Regia and in Japan's bj league with Hamamatsu Phoenix.

=== Return to China ===
In 2009, he returned to China to play for the Beijing Ducks in the Chinese Basketball Association (CBA).

== Personal life ==
In the summer of 2005, Sun discovered that he had a benign tumor attached to his pituitary gland. Because he had neither health insurance nor enough money to pay for the more than $100,000 in medical bills, his sports agent, Charles Bonsignore of Passing Lane Sports, started a fundraiser to raise the necessary money. The tumor was successfully removed on September 26, 2005.

On 4 August 2013, he married Xu Yan, who is 6 feet 2 inches (1.88 m) tall. They are recognized by Guinness World Records as the tallest living married couple with their combined height of 13 feet 10.72 inches (423.47 cm).

== Filmography ==
=== Film ===
Year	English title	Original title	Role
2007	Rush Hour 3		Kung-Fu Giant
2016	Funny Soccer	笑林足球	Dragon
2017	The Thousand Faces of Dunjia	奇門遁甲	Goldfinger

=== TV series ===
Year	English title	Chinese title	Role	Notes
2016	Singing All Along	秀麗江山之長歌行	Giant	
2016	Candle in the Tomb	鬼吹灯之精绝古城	Honghou	

== See also ==
- Robert Bobroczkyi
- Neil Fingleton
- Olivier Rioux
- List of tallest people
