= WJKN (AM) =

Coordinates: 42°13′17″N 84°26′8″W

Jackson, Michigan; United States
- Broadcast area: Jackson, Michigan
- Frequency: 1510 kHz
- Branding: Good Shepherd Catholic Radio

Programming
- Format: Catholic talk
- Affiliations: EWTN Radio

Ownership
- Owner: Jackson Lansing Catholic Radio

History
- First air date: 1963
- Former call signs: WJCO (5/18/90-8/21/95); WHBT (1/1/89-5/18/90); WJCO (4/18/84-1/1/89); WDJD (?-4/18/84)
- Call sign meaning: Jackson

Technical information
- Licensing authority: FCC
- Class: D
- Power: 420 watts day
- Translator: 93.3 W227BY (Jackson)

Links
- Public license information: Public file; LMS
- Webcast: Listen Live
- Website: goodshepherdcatholicradio.org

WJKN (1510 kHz) is a non-commercial Catholic talk AM radio station in Jackson, Michigan, United States of America. WJKN is owned by Jackson-Lansing Catholic Radio and is rebroadcast on FM translator W227BY at 93.3 FM, also licensed to Jackson.

== History ==
AM 1510 was a country music station for over three decades under several call signs, including WJCO, WDJD, and WHBT. The WJKN calls were adopted in 1995 and the format changed to a full-service combination of news, talk and adult contemporary music. In 1998, WJKN phased out music programming and became a predominantly news station. Then, in September 2000, the station went dark after owner Coltrace Communications (the owner of WUPS in Houghton Lake) sold the land on which the station's towers were located to a developer. Shortly afterward, Coltrace donated WJKN to its current owner, Spring Arbor University, which returned the station to the air briefly in late 2001 and early 2002 with a simulcast of WSAE. WJKN was then again dark for several months, and then resurfaced in March 2003 simulcasting 1540 KTGG, whose 450-watt signal does not make it far outside of Spring Arbor.

In April 2014, it was announced that Spring Arbor University was selling WJKN 1510 to Jackson-Lansing Catholic Radio (d/b/a Good Shepherd Radio). This was the Catholic broadcaster's second go at getting a radio station in the Jackson area, as they had been in the process of buying the now-defunct WJKQ 88.5 FM when that station's license was revoked by the FCC. The sale was completed in August 2014. WJKN's FM translator, W227BY was also formerly owned by Spring Arbor University and operated out of Somerset, Michigan as a translator of WSAE 106.9 FM.

== Sources ==
- Michiguide.com - WJKN History
- Facility details for Facility ID 53291 (WJKN) in the FCC Licensing and Management System
- WJKN in Nielsen Audio's AM station database
