= Donald Gould =

American musician and composer

- Born: Michigan, U.S.
- Occupations: Musician; composer
- Years active: 2015–present
- Label: Triple Pop
- Education: Spring Arbor University
- Military career
- Allegiance: United States
- Branch: United States Marine Corps

Donald Gould is an American musician and composer. After spending many years on the streets, Gould was discovered in Sarasota, Florida, when playing a rendition of "Come Sail Away", by the American rock band Styx, on a public piano, from which he gained the nickname "The Homeless Piano Man". He is currently signed with the independent record label Triple Pop and has released one studio album: Walk on Water. He is a U.S. military veteran.

== Biography ==
=== Early years ===
Originally from Michigan, Gould played the clarinet from an early age. When he served in the United States Marine Corps, he played for the Marine Corps Band. Once he left the Marines, he studied music education at Spring Arbor University but, due to financial difficulties, was unable to complete his education.

=== Discovery and early fame ===
When his wife died by suicide in 1998, and his son was subsequently taken away from him, Gould developed a substance use disorder and eventually became homeless. It wasn't until 2015, when he sat down at a public piano in Sarasota, Florida, and played "Come Sail Away" by the American rock band Styx, that his musical talent was discovered. The performance video was recorded by a passerby and became viral overnight with tens of millions of views on YouTube.

A few months after the video was uploaded, Gould was given a makeover by the TV show Inside Edition and raised over $40,000 on GoFundMe to pay for his drug rehabilitation. He was also offered a full scholarship by Spring Arbor University to complete his studies. While in recovery, he was invited by the San Francisco 49ers to play at their opening game of the 2015 season, against the Minnesota Vikings. On September 14, 2015, he played The Star-Spangled Banner at Levi's Stadium in front of 75,000 fans. The lead vocalist and founding member of Styx, Dennis DeYoung, also congratulated Gould while during his interview as a surprise guest on the Drive radio show on Chicago's WDRV.

=== Court case ===
Gould was part of a lawsuit with the American Civil Liberties Union (ACLU) against the city of Sarasota on September 30, 2015. The action sought to challenge the city's apparent criminalization of homeless people due to city ordinances that targeted sleeping in public and panhandling. The case was settled in June 2016, where there were allowances made for homeless people in regard to the city ordinances in Sarasota as well as 10 extra beds supplied to the Salvation Army for use by homeless people.

=== Record label signing and debut album ===
Gould was signed to an independent record label Triple Pop in 2016 and soon released a single of his piano cover of "Come Sail Away". In 2017, he released a full studio album entitled Walk on Water, which featured a mix of musical styles from contemporary to classical as well as his own original composition all performed on piano.

== Personal life ==
Gould reestablished contact with his son, Donny, who had been taken away by social services at age three and was adopted.
