= Survivor 49 =

Season of television series

- Season 49
- Presented by: Jeff Probst
- No. of days: 26
- No. of castaways: 18
- Winner: Savannah Louie
- Runner-up: Sophi Balerdi
- Location: Mamanuca Islands, Fiji
- No. of episodes: 13

Release
- Original network: CBS
- Original release: September 24 – December 17, 2025

Additional information
- Filming dates: April 20 – May 15, 2025

Season chronology
- ← Previous; Survivor 48 Next → In the Hands of the Fans

Survivor 49 is the forty-ninth season of the American competitive reality television series Survivor. It premiered on September 24, 2025, on CBS in the United States. It was the seventeenth consecutive season to be filmed in the Mamanuca Islands in Fiji.

The season ended on December 17, 2025, when Savannah Louie was voted the Sole Survivor, defeating Sophi Balerdi and Sage Ahrens-Nichols in a 5–2–1 vote. Louie became the fifth winner of Asian heritage, following Yul Kwon from Survivor: Cook Islands, Natalie Anderson from Survivor: San Juan del Sur, Erika Casupanan from Survivor 41, and Rachel LaMont from Survivor 47.

== Format ==
Survivor is a reality television show based on the Swedish show Expedition Robinson, created by Mark Burnett and Charlie Parsons. The series follows a number of participants isolated in a remote location, where they must provide food, fire, and shelter. One by one, a participant is removed from the series by majority vote, with challenges held to give a reward (ranging from living- and food-related prizes to a car) and immunity from being voted out of the series. The last remaining player receives a prize of $1,000,000.

== Contestants ==
Cast of Survivor 49. Eventual winner Savannah Louie at the center spot of the front row of the center group (original Uli)

The 18 castaways were officially announced on August 20, 2025. Notable cast members include Annie Davis, lead singer of the band Trashy Annie; former Marvel Studios executive Nate Moore; and former WANF news reporter Savannah Louie.

List of Survivor 49 contestants
| Contestant | Age | From | Tribe | | | | Finish | |
| Contestant | Age | From | Original | First switch | Second switch | Merged | Placement | Day |
|---|---|---|---|---|---|---|---|---|
| Nicole Mazullo | 26 | Philadelphia, Pennsylvania | Kele | | | | 1st voted out | Day 3 |
| Kimberly "Annie" Davis | 49 | Austin, Texas | Kele | | | | 2nd voted out | Day 5 |
| Jake Latimer | 35 | St. Albert, Alberta | Kele | | | | Medically evacuated | Day 6 |
| Jeremiah Ing | 39 | Toronto, Ontario | Kele | | | | 3rd voted out | Day 6 |
| Matt Williams | 52 | St. George, Utah | Hina | Hina | | | 4th voted out | Day 8 |
| Jason Treul | 32 | Santa Ana, California | Hina | Hina | | | 5th voted out | Day 10 |
| Shannon Fairweather | 27 | Boston, Massachusetts | Uli | Kele | Kele | | 6th voted out | Day 12 |
| Nate Moore | 47 | Hermosa Beach, California | Uli | Hina | Uli | Lewatu | 7th voted out 1st jury member | Day 14 |
| Michelle "MC" Chukwujekwu | 29 | San Diego, California | Hina | Kele | Hina | Lewatu | 8th voted out 2nd jury member | Day 15 |
| Alex Moore | 26 | Washington, D.C. | Kele | Kele | Uli | Lewatu | 9th voted out 3rd jury member | Day 17 |
| Jawan Pitts | 28 | Los Angeles, California | Uli | Hina | Kele | Lewatu | 10th voted out 4th jury member | Day 19 |
| Sophie Segreti | 31 | New York City, New York | Hina | Kele | Uli | Lewatu | 11th voted out 5th jury member | Day 21 |
| Steven Ramm | 35 | Denver, Colorado | Hina | Kele | Kele | Lewatu | 12th voted out 6th jury member | Day 23 |
| Kristina Mills | 35 | Edmond, Oklahoma | Hina | Kele | Uli | Lewatu | 13th voted out 7th jury member | Day 24 |
| Rizo Velovic | 25 | Yonkers, New York | Uli | Hina | Hina | Lewatu | Eliminated; 8th jury member | Day 25 |
| Sage Ahrens-Nichols | 30 | Olympia, Washington | Uli | Kele | Kele | Lewatu | 2nd runner-up | Day 26 |
| Sophi Balerdi | 27 | Miami, Florida | Kele | Hina | Hina | Lewatu | Runner-up | Day 26 |
| Savannah Louie | 31 | Atlanta, Georgia | Uli | Hina | Hina | Lewatu | Sole Survivor | Day 26 |

=== Future appearances ===
Savannah Louie and Rizo Velovic returned for the following season, Survivor 50: In the Hands of the Fans.

== Season summary ==
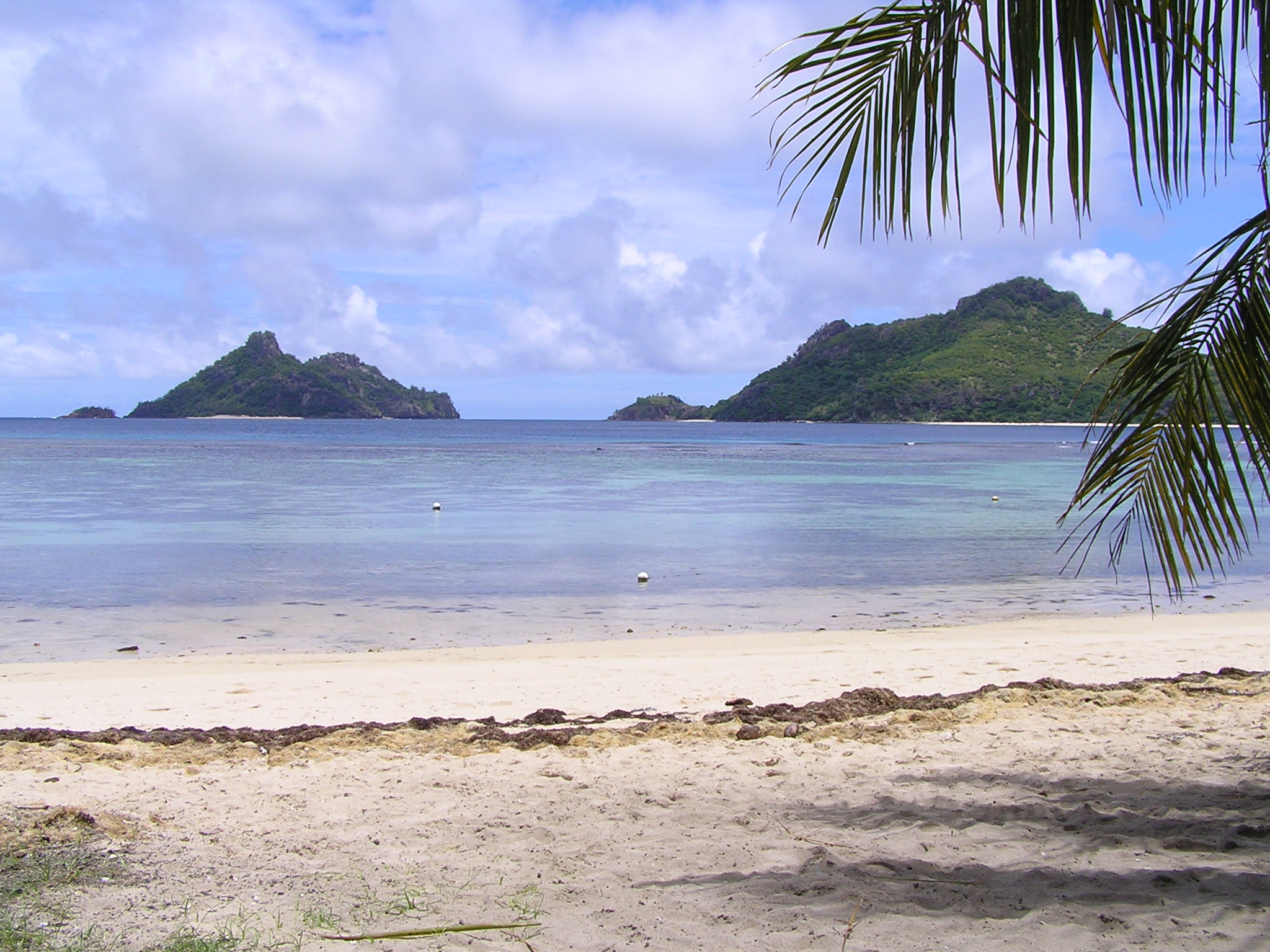
The season filmed in the Mamanuca Islands of Fiji.

Eighteen castaways were divided into three tribes: Hina, Kele, and Uli. Kele lost every challenge before the first swap, and their strongest member Jake was evacuated due to a freak occurrence. Surviving members Alex and Sophi managed to fly under the radar through two swaps due to the Hina and Uli alliances going to war, and Sophi found new life with Uli majority members Rizo and Savannah.

Despite losing their ally Nate at the first merged vote, Rizo and Savannah took control of the game, reaching the final four with Sophi and outsider Sage. Sophi won the final immunity challenge and took Sage to the end; Savannah easily defeated Rizo at fire, and her firm control of the game throughout earned the jury's respect and the victory in a 5–2–1 vote over Sophi and Sage, respectively.

Survivor 49 season summary
| Episode | | | Challenge winner(s) | | Journey | Eliminated | |
| No. | Title | Air date | Reward | Immunity | Journey | Tribe | Player |
|---|---|---|---|---|---|---|---|
| 1 | "Act One of a Horror Film" | September 24, 2025 | Hina | None | None | Kele | Nicole |
| 1 | "Act One of a Horror Film" | September 24, 2025 | Hina | | None | Kele | Nicole |
| 1 | "Act One of a Horror Film" | September 24, 2025 | Uli | | None | Kele | Nicole |
| 2 | "Cinema" | October 1, 2025 | Hina | | Jake (Kele) | Kele | Annie |
| 2 | "Cinema" | October 1, 2025 | Hina | | Jawan (Uli) | Kele | Annie |
| 2 | "Cinema" | October 1, 2025 | Uli | | Matt (Hina) | Kele | Annie |
| 3 | "Lovable Losers" | October 8, 2025 | None | | None | Kele | Jake |
| 3 | "Lovable Losers" | October 8, 2025 | Hina | | None | Kele | Jeremiah |
| 3 | "Lovable Losers" | October 8, 2025 | Uli | | None | Kele | Jeremiah |
| 4 | "Go Kick Rocks, Bro" | October 15, 2025 | Kele | | None | Hina | Matt |
| 5 | "I'm a Wolf, Baby" | October 22, 2025 | Kele | | MC (Kele) | Hina | Jason |
| 5 | "I'm a Wolf, Baby" | October 22, 2025 | Kele | | Nate (Hina) | Hina | Jason |
| 6 | "The Devil's Shoes" | October 29, 2025 | Hina | Hina | None | Kele | Shannon |
| 6 | "The Devil's Shoes" | October 29, 2025 | Uli | Uli | None | Kele | Shannon |
| 7 | "Blood Will Be Drawn" | November 5, 2025 | Nate, Rizo, Sophi, Sophie, Steven, [Sage] (Note: After finding an advantage on Day 14, Sage was automatically given reward and the chance to compete for immunity.) | Sophie | None | Lewatu | Nate |
| 8 | "Hot Grim Reaper" | November 12, 2025 | Savannah (Note: Savannah received an additional individual reward for finishing first place overall in the challenge.) [Alex, Kristina, Sophi, Steven] | | None | Lewatu | MC |
| 9 | "If You’re Loyal to All, You’re Loyal to None" | November 19, 2025 | Alex, ~~Kristina~~ (Jawan), Savannah, Sophie (Note: Kristina was on the winning team but chose to give her reward to Jawan.) | Savannah | None | Lewatu | Alex |
| 9 | "If You’re Loyal to All, You’re Loyal to None" | November 19, 2025 | Alex, ~~Kristina~~ (Jawan), Savannah, Sophie | Steven | None | Lewatu | Alex |
| 10 | "Huge Dose of Bamboozle" | November 26, 2025 | Sage, Sophi, Sophie, Steven | Sophie | None | Lewatu | Jawan |
| 11 | "Cherry On Top" | December 3, 2025 | Steven [Kristina, Rizo] (Note: In addition to immunity, Steven won reward for himself and two other castaways of his choice; he chose Kristina and Rizo.) | Steven | Steven | Lewatu | Sophie |
| 12 | "The Die Is Cast" | December 10, 2025 | Savannah [Rizo, Sophi] | Savannah | None | Lewatu | Steven |
| 13 | "A Fever Dream" | December 17, 2025 | Savannah [Sage] (Note: In addition to immunity, Savannah won reward for herself and another castaway of her choice; she chose Sage.) | Savannah | None | Lewatu | Kristina |
| 13 | "A Fever Dream" | December 17, 2025 | None | Sophi (Note: For winning the final Immunity Challenge, Sophi had to assign additional immunity to another player, with the remaining two competing in a fire-making challenge to determine the third finalist; she gave additional immunity to Sage.) [Sage] | None | Lewatu | Rizo |

== Episodes ==
| No. overall | No. in season | Title | Rating/share (18–49) | Original release date | U.S. viewers (millions) |
|---|---|---|---|---|---|
| 702 | 1 | "Act One of a Horror Film" | 0.6/9 | September 24, 2025 | 4.03 |
The 18 new castaways arrived in Fiji by boat to begin their Survivor journey.: Marooning Challenge: Two tribe members raced into the jungle for crates. Two other tribe members then retrieved a boat full of crates from the ocean. The last two members assembled the crates to make a cube, which one tribe member would climb to ring a bell hanging above them. The first to ring the bell won flint, a pot, and a machete for their tribe. The two losing tribes would have to send a tribe member away to complete another challenge to earn their supplies.; Hina won the reward challenge. Uli sent Rizo to complete the supply challenge, while Kele sent Alex.: Supply Challenge: Each castaway must retrieve ten marked coconuts on a small peninsula, each containing multiple puzzle pieces. Once all coconuts are collected, they must use the pieces to assemble a map revealing the location of a buried ship wheel; each tribe had its own wheel in a different location on the peninsula. Using the wheel, they must raise their tribe's sail, which releases a key to the chest containing the supplies. The first to unlock the chest wins the supplies for their tribe.; Rizo completed the challenge first, winning supplies for Uli.: Immunity Challenge: Each tribe was split into three pairs. Each pair in turn navigated a rope tunnel, crawled through a muddy pit, then raced into the jungle to retrieve a large serpent. When all three serpents were retrieved, three players worked together to navigate a ball along a winding snake track. The first two tribes to finish won immunity, while the losing tribe had to forfeit their flint.; Hina and Uli won the challenge. At Kele, the majority alliance of Alex, Jake, Jeremiah, and Sophi targeted outsiders Annie and Nicole, considering them the weakest members of the tribe physically, Nicole in particular. Annie attempted to form an alliance with Sophi, saying that she wanted to target Alex and Jake in the future. Sophi notified the majority alliance of Annie's proposal, and they considered voting Annie out over Nicole because of this. However, at Tribal Council, they ultimately chose to vote out Nicole.
| 703 | 2 | "Cinema" | 0.6/8 | October 1, 2025 | 4.03 |
At Kele, Alex and Jake found a beware advantage, and the majority alliance affirmed their plan to target Annie next. At Hina, Matt invited MC into his alliance with Kristina and Steven, but a distrustful MC alerted Sophie of this. At Uli, Jawan was on the outs and further strained his relationship with Savannah by unknowingly taking her bag and dumping its contents to fill it with firewood. Jake, Jawan, and Matt were chosen for a journey.: Journey: Players tossed coconuts in their opponents’ bags, causing them to eventually drop from the weight. The last person left standing won.; Jawan won and had a choice between stealing Jake or Matt’s next vote or imposing a disadvantage on Hina or Kele at the next challenge. He chose the latter.: Reward/Immunity Challenge: Tribes traversed an obstacle course and dug a ladder out, holding it up for one member to retrieve a key. The key unlocked a ramp to a large puzzle. The first two tribes to complete their puzzle won immunity plus a large fishing kit for first place and a smaller fishing kit for second place, while the losing tribe had to forfeit their flint.; After learning the disadvantage would be for each tribe member to carry twenty pounds of coconuts through the obstacle course and to work through ten keys instead of one, Jawan chose to penalize Hina. In spite of the penalties, Hina placed first and Uli placed second after Kele’s massive lead was blown at the puzzle. At Kele, Alex found an idol and told everyone, including Annie, who Alex had tried to secretly align with. He considered voting out Sophi over Annie, but at Tribal Council, everyone stuck to the original plan to vote out Annie.
| 704 | 3 | "Loveable Losers" | 0.6/9 | October 8, 2025 | 4.23 |
At Kele, on the morning of the Immunity Challenge, Jake was bitten by a sea krait. He was immediately taken to Base Camp, where the medical staff treated him. While the bite was determined to be non-venomous, the medical staff refused to clear him to return to the game, given the conditions at Kele and the inability to monitor his condition. (Unusually, significant portions of Jake's treatment at Base Camp were shown on-camera; moreover, Alex showed that each tribe receives a binder depicting animals and plants to avoid.): Immunity Challenge: One tribe member from each tribe raced to the top of a tower and leapt into the ocean. They then crossed a survivor water totter, retrieved a key, made their way across a series of floating platforms, and swam to the end. Then the next two players went. Once everyone was at the end, two players unlocked and solved a survivor turtle puzzle. The first two tribes to finish won immunity, while the losing tribe had to forfeit their flint.; Hina and Uli won yet again. MC and Rizo found Hina and Uli's respective beware advantages. Sophi and Jeremiah plotted to blindside Alex by making him feel comfortable enough to not play his idol, but when Sophi overheard Alex tell Jeremiah he was considering voting Sophi to save himself, Sophi considered voting Jeremiah instead. At Tribal Council, Alex played his idol and Jeremiah was voted out.
| 705 | 4 | "Go Kick Rocks, Bro" | 0.6/9 | October 15, 2025 | 4.27 |
On day 8, the tribes were reshuffled and Uli was disbanded. Sophi from Kele and Jawan, Nate, Rizo, and Savannah from Uli joined Jason and Matt at Hina. Kristina, MC, Sophie, and Steven from Hina and Sage and Shannon from Uli joined Alex at Kele.: Reward/Immunity Challenge: Starting in the water, tribes pulled their boat to two stations of five small cubes on each. Once their boat was hooked at shore, one tribe member brought those cubes across a balance beam in two trips, while the remaining six worked together to transport ten larger cubes across parallel and uneven beams. The seven members then worked together to individually stack the twenty cubes into a high tower. The first tribe to complete their tower won immunity and a fruit reward, while the losing tribe had to forfeit their flint.; Kele won. Rizo followed his clue to an idol. Sophi was brought into the majority alliance of members of the old Uli tribe, and they debated whether to target Jason or Matt. Meanwhile, Matt tried to gain traction for a move against Nate. At Tribal Council, while Savannah and Sophi voted for Jason, the remaining members of the majority alliance and Jason voted out Matt.
| 706 | 5 | "I'm a Wolf, Baby" | 0.7/9 | October 22, 2025 | 4.36 |
At Kele, Sage began working against Shannon and also told her tribemates that Rizo found Uli's beware advantage. MC and Nate were chosen for a journey.: Journey: MC and Nate had to work together to move a large pile of sandbags before a timer ran out. If successful, each kept their vote at the next Tribal Council. If they failed, both lost their vote. Halfway through the pile, they discovered another note. Hidden nearby under a rock lay an advantage. The first to find it kept their vote while the other had to finish the task alone before the timer ran out to keep their vote. However, the advantage dies if the timer runs out or the sandbag task is completed before the advantage is found.; They decided to complete the task together, thus keeping their votes and nullifying the advantage.: Reward/Immunity Challenge: Tribes swam to a bamboo cage where they climbed up and jumped in the cage. They then carried the cage out of the water and up the beach to a series of three baskets where one player would dig out from under the cage and retrieve missed balls the others shot at the baskets. The first tribe to land a ball in each of the three baskets won immunity plus three hens and a rooster, while the losing tribe had to forfeit their flint.; Kele won again. Though most of the tribe agreed to vote out Jason, Savannah hoped to blindside Jawan. At Tribal Council, the tribe stayed united to vote out Jason.
| 707 | 6 | "The Devil's Shoes" | 0.6/8 | October 29, 2025 | 4.25 |
On day 11, just prior to the Reward Challenge, the tribes were shuffled again. Alex, Kristina, Nate, and Sophie went to Uli. Shannon, Sage, Jawan, and Steven went to Kele. Sophi, MC, Savannah, and Rizo went to Hina.: Reward Challenge: Tribes pushed a heavy cart along a bumpy track collecting sandbags. At each of two stations along the way, one tribe member then climbed a ladder and used a long pole to knock two disks off a high perch. Once at the finish, players used one of the disks to knock over four bamboo targets. The first two tribes to finish won a food reward of grilled cheese sandwiches, chips, and iced tea for first place, and grilled cheese for second place.; Hina and Uli won. Old tribal lines put MC, Steven, and Nate in unfavorable positions on their new tribes, but Steven bonded with Jawan while Sage was ready to make a move against Shannon on Kele. Meanwhile on Hina, Sophi found a Knowledge is Power.: Immunity Challenge: Tribes raced up and over a hinged cargo net, then moved a pile of heavy sandbags stacking them onto a platform. One player then climbed on top of the pile to retrieve a bag of sticks and string used to construct an extending pole that was then used to retrieve a key. The key released a ball which was used by two players to maneuver through a tilt table maze. The first two tribes to finish won immunity, while the losing tribe had to forfeit their flint.; Hina and Uli won. Shannon hoped to foster working relationships with the old Hina members in the future by targeting Jawan, but at Tribal Council, Sage's plan to blindside Shannon came to fruition.
| 708 | 7 | "Blood Will Be Drawn" | 0.6/9 | November 5, 2025 | 4.37 |
On day 13, the three tribes convened at Kele's beach to begin the individual stage of the game. Many keys were hidden in the jungle, one of which unlocked a chest to an advantage for the forthcoming challenge; Sage earned the advantage.: Reward Challenge: Tribes dug a massive boulder out from the ground and rolled it over obstacles before one person climbed it to retrieve a machete. One teammate used the machete to chop a rope to progress to the end, where the team would climb the boulder up to the top to solve a word puzzle. The first team to finish their puzzle won the merge feast and the right to compete for individual immunity.; Sage's advantage was that she would automatically earn the merge meal and a spot in the immunity challenge. Nate, Rizo, Sophi, Sophie, and Steven won reward.: Immunity Challenge: Castaways held a pole that had a ball on top while balancing on a beam. At regular intervals, they would move to narrower sections of the beam while moving their hands further down the pole. If they fell off or their ball dropped, they were out. The last person left standing won immunity.; Sophie won immunity. MC was able to retrieve the idol from her beware advantage despite interference by Savannah. Jawan and Sage joined old Hina, and they debated whether to target Nate, Rizo, or Savannah. The Uli alliance targeted Steven. At Tribal Council, MC played her idol but negated no votes, and Nate was sent to the jury.
| 709 | 8 | "Hot Grim Reaper" | 0.5/8 | November 12, 2025 | 3.90 |
Kristina found an idol in front of Steven and Alex.: Immunity Challenge: Players used their hands and arms to brace against two walls with their feet on narrow footholds. At intervals, they moved down to smaller footholds. If they drop, they’re out. The twist: Players were split into two groups of five. The group that lasts the longest gets immunity and no tribal council. The losing group goes to tribal with no immunity. Additionally, the person lasting the longest earned an advantage and that group gets a reward of DIY deli sandwiches.; Savannah won the advantage with the team of Steven, Sophi, Alex, and Kristina getting reward. Her advantage was to go to the losing group during tribal and cast a vote or bank it for an extra vote. Though Rizo was the consensus target, Sophie plotted to cast a stray vote for Jawan in case Rizo played his idol. MC alerted Jawan of this, who told the others. This came back to haunt MC as she was sent to the jury, with Rizo holding onto his idol and Savannah banking her vote.
| 710 | 9 | "If You're Loyal to All, You're Loyal to None" | 0.6/9 | November 19, 2025 | 4.17 |
Reactions to MC going and not Sophie put the latter on high alert, and she considered flipping to the minority.: Reward Challenge: Divided into two teams of four via schoolyard pick (with one castaway not being chosen), castaways pushed a large heavy cube from the start to a station with a sandbag. One castaway climbed the cube to free the sandbag, then all team members crawled under a net. One castaway tossed the sandbag in the air to free three rings from a high pole, then they would toss those rings back onto the pole. The first team to finish won a food reward of fried chicken, french fries, and cheesecake.; Sophi was not chosen and picked the yellow team to win, but the blue team of Alex, Kristina, Savannah, and Sophie won. However, Kristina chose to give her spot to Jawan who hadn’t won a food reward up to that point. Rizo planned to target Alex, who had been playing the middle more obviously, while the majority hoped to split between Rizo and Savannah.: Immunity Challenge: Players used their feet to hold a large disc in place against a small support. If their disc dropped, they were out. The last man and woman standing won immunity.; Steven and Savannah won immunity. Sophi became the backup target for the split vote, while Rizo tried to convince Jawan and Sage to flip and vote out Alex. At Tribal Council, no advantages were played, and Jawan, Sage, and Sophie joined the minority alliance to send Alex to the jury.
| 711 | 10 | "Huge Dose of Bamboozle" | 0.6/9 | November 26, 2025 | 4.25 |
Reward Challenge: Players divided into two teams of 4 by schoolyard pick. One pair on each team leapt off a high platform into the water. They then traversed a series of obstacles and retrieved a buoy with a rope attached to it. Then the second pair did the same. At the end they attached the buoys to tall poles and had to sling the buoys into a basket on top of the poles. The first team to finish won a reward of burgers, hot dogs, and chocolate cake at the Survivor Sanctuary.; Sophi, Sophie, Sage, and Steven won reward.: Immunity Challenge: Players raced into a Survivor teeter tunnel, then maneuvered disks around an obstacle to release a handle. The handle was then used to transport puzzle pieces over a teeter totter balance beam. Once all the pieces were collected, they were used to assemble a logo puzzle.; Sophie won immunity. She joined Rizo’s alliance while Jawan and Sage flipped back to Kristina and Steven. Savannah planned to use her extra vote to break the stalemate and changed the target from Steven to Sage, but Sophie convinced her to target Jawan instead. At Tribal Council, Kristina played her idol on Steven while Rizo played a fake on Savannah, and Jawan was sent to the jury.
| 712 | 11 | "Cherry On Top" | 0.6/10 | December 3, 2025 | 4.41 |
Sage was upset at being left out of Jawan’s blindside and lashed out at Sophie. Steven was selected for a journey.: Journey: Steven had to navigate around the shore of an island searching for numbers that would provide the solution to a lock combination. If he unlocked the chest before the high tide made an advantage unreachable, he would win a Block-a-Vote. He was able to complete the task in time.; Reward/Immunity Challenge: Castaways had to stack blocks spelling "immunity" on a revolving table. If their letters dropped, they had to start over. The first person to finish and stand on the starting platform for three seconds won immunity plus a spaghetti reward.; Steven won immunity and chose to share reward with Kristina and Rizo. Sage was adamant that Sophie should go next, but Sophi considered flipping on her allies Rizo and Savannah. At Tribal Council, no advantages were played, and Sophie was unanimously sent to the jury.
| 713 | 12 | "The Die Is Cast" | 0.8/13 | December 10, 2025 | 4.77 |
Reward Challenge: Castaways had to traverse a highstep obstacle, then maneuver a bag on a rope through a ladder bridge, then crawl under another obstacle and retrieve two more bags. Once they had all three bags, they needed to land a sandbag on a small high perch. The first to do this won Mexican food at the sanctuary and their letters from home.; Savannah won reward and chose to share it with Rizo and Sophi. Both alliances regrouped with Steven and Sophi revealing their advantages to their allies. Mulling flipping on her longtime allies, Sophi decided to stick with them.: Immunity Challenge: Castaways used their foot to balance a ball at the end of a beam. If their ball dropped, they were out. The last one standing won immunity.; Savannah won her third immunity necklace. Sophi hoped to use her advantage to steal Steven's, but unbeknownst to her, he could only play it before Tribal whereas she could only play hers at Tribal. Steven declared he would block Savannah's vote. At Tribal Council, Sophi's advantage was nullified, and Rizo again kept his idol after initially getting ready to play it for himself. The idol was not needed as Sage and Kristina turned on Steven as a big threat, sending him to the jury.
| 714 | 13 | "A Fever Dream" | 0.7/9 | December 17, 2025 | 4.45 |
On day 24, castaways were tasked with finding an advantage in the upcoming immunity challenge.: Advantage Scramble: Survivors raced through the jungle collecting pieces to a puzzle map showing the location of a hidden advantage to be used in the next challenge. Sophi was the first to finish her puzzle. After much searching, she spotted a bag high up in a tree. Using a bamboo pole, she retrieved the bag thus winning the advantage.; Reward/Immunity Challenge: Survivors crawled through a muddy pit, then dug up a grappling hook. They used the hook to drop a ladder and climbed up into a crows nest to retrieve a rope. Using the rope, they had to walk on a barrel rolling it along a sandy pathway to a tall platform where they maneuvered a bag of puzzle pieces to the top and then solved a Survivor puzzle. The first to complete their puzzle won reward and immunity.; Savannah won her fourth immunity challenge, tying the women's record. She chose to share her reward with Sage. The vote came down to majority alliance outsiders Kristina and Sage. At Tribal, Rizo played his idol, and Kristina was sent to the jury.: Immunity Challenge: Contestants leapt into the ocean and made their way to shore where they dug under a log and crawled through. They then traversed a balance beam collecting two handles and a ball along the way. Then they used the handles to collect a second ball from a wire cage. They then assembled a table track and maneuvered the balls along it landing them in separate targets. First to finish won immunity.; Sophi came from behind to win her first immunity challenge. She ultimately decided to take Sage to the end, forcing longtime allies Rizo and Savannah to battle it out in fire.: Firemaking Challenge: Savannah easily defeated Rizo, sending him to the jury.; At the Final Tribal Council, the jury voted Savannah the sole survivor in a 5–2–1 vote, with Sophi receiving MC & Kristina's votes to place second and Sage receiving Jawan's vote to place third.

== Voting history ==
Survivor 49 voting history
| | Original tribes | | | | First switch | | Second switch | Merged tribe | | | | | | | | |
| Episode | 1 | 2 | 3 | | 4 | 5 | 6 | 7 | 8 | 9 | 10 | | 11 | 12 | 13 | |
|---|---|---|---|---|---|---|---|---|---|---|---|---|---|---|---|---|
| Day | 3 | 5 | 6 | | 8 | 10 | 12 | 14 | 15 | 17 | 19 | | 21 | 23 | 24 | 25 |
| Tribe | Kele | Kele | Kele | Kele | Hina | Hina | Kele | Lewatu | Lewatu | Lewatu | Lewatu | | Lewatu | Lewatu | Lewatu | Lewatu |
| Eliminated | Nicole | Annie | Jake | Jeremiah | Matt | Jason | Shannon | Nate | MC | Alex | Jawan | | Sophie | Steven | Kristina | Rizo |
| Votes | 5–1 | 4–1 | Evacuated (Note: No vote; Jake was medically evacuated from the game.) | 2–0 (Note: Alex played a hidden immunity idol on himself; therefore, one vote for him was not counted.) | 4–2–1 | 5–1 | 3–1 | 7–4 | 4–1 | 6–2–1 | 5–3–1 | | 6–1 | 4–1 | 4–1 | None (Note: For winning the final Immunity Challenge, Sophi had to assign additional immunity to another player, with the remaining two competing in a fire-making challenge to determine the third finalist; she gave additional immunity to Sage, and Savannah defeated Rizo in the fire-making challenge.) |
| Voter | Vote | | | | | | | | | | | | | | | Challenge |
| Savannah | | | | | Jason | Jason | | Steven | None (Note: The players who won immunity on Day 15 were not eligible to vote at that night's Tribal Council, except Savannah, who had retained the right to vote through the advantage she won at the Day 15 challenge.) (Note: This player played a Bank Your Vote advantage, and as a result, deferred that night's vote to another Tribal Council.) | Alex | Jawan | Jawan (Note: This player played an extra vote advantage, and was able to cast two ballots during a single vote.) | Sophie | None (Note: This player could not vote as another player used a block-a-vote advantage.) | Kristina | Won |
| Sophi | Nicole | Annie | | Jeremiah | Jason | Jason | | Steven | Immune | Alex | Jawan | | Sophie | Steven | Kristina | Immune |
| Sage | | | | | | | Shannon | Nate | MC | Alex | Savannah | | Sophie | Steven | Kristina | Saved |
| Rizo | | | | | Matt | Jason | | Steven | MC | Alex | Jawan | | Sophie | Steven | Kristina | Lost |
| Kristina | | | | | | | | Nate | Immune | Sophi | Rizo | | Sophie | Steven | Sage | |
| Steven | | | | | | | Shannon | Nate | Immune | Sophi | Savannah | | Sophie | Sophi | | |
| Sophie | | | | | | | | Nate | MC | Alex | Jawan | | Savannah | | | |
| Jawan | | | | | Matt | Jason | Shannon | Nate | MC | Alex | Savannah | | | | | |
| Alex | Nicole | Annie | | Jeremiah | | | | Nate | Immune | Rizo | | | | | | |
| MC | | | | | | | | Nate | Sophie | | | | | | | |
| Nate | | | | | Matt | Jason | | Steven | | | | | | | | |
| Shannon | | | | | | | Jawan | | | | | | | | | |
| Jason | | | | | Matt | Rizo | | | | | | | | | | |
| Matt | | | | | Nate | | | | | | | | | | | |
| Jeremiah | Nicole | Annie | | ~~Alex~~ | | | | | | | | | | | | |
| Jake | Nicole | Annie | Evacuated | | | | | | | | | | | | | |
| Annie | Nicole | Sophi | | | | | | | | | | | | | | |
| Nicole | Annie | | | | | | | | | | | | | | | |

Jury vote
| Episode | 13 | | |
|---|---|---|---|
| Day | 26 | | |
| Finalist | Savannah | Sophi | Sage |
| Votes | 5–2–1 | | |
| Juror | Vote | | |
| Rizo | Yes | | |
| Kristina | | Yes | |
| Steven | Yes | | |
| Sophie | Yes | | |
| Jawan | | | Yes |
| Alex | Yes | | |
| MC | | Yes | |
| Nate | Yes | | |

== Production ==
On December 15, 2023, Manoa Kamikamica, the Fijian Minister of Commerce, Trade, Tourism and Transport, announced that the Fijian Parliament had renewed its contract with Survivor for an additional two years. A preview trailer for the season was released on May 21, 2025, right after the finale of Survivor 48 aired. Like in the previous season, Survivor 49 and The Amazing Race 38 retain the 90-minute runtime; the premiere episode of Survivor 49 ran for two hours.

The American broadcast of the finale was interrupted by an address by President Donald Trump. The broadcast of the finale was not interrupted internationally, with the finale airing regularly in Canada, where the series airs on Global, and in Australia, where the finale aired on 9Go! as a special daytime airing alongside the intended American East Coast airing.

== Reception ==
Survivor 49 received a mixed reception from both fans and critics. While the personalities of Savannah and Rizo, Savannah's winning gameplay, and the entertainment value of the post-merge section were praised, the gameplay of the other castaways as well as the edit and the pre-merge section were criticized. Many also felt that the "new era" format of the show had begun to feel repetitive and uninteresting.

== Controversy ==
During the pre-game sequester period at Ponderosa, two of the original cast members were caught colluding with each other. The situation became so severe, that they were ejected from the game before it even started; they were ultimately replaced by Jason Treul and MC Chukwujekwu, both alternates for this season. Additionally, third place finisher Sage Ahrens-Nichols alleged that two other castaways, Jake Latimer and Sophi Balerdi, also engaged in pre-game scheming; these claims were corroborated by fellow castaway Annie Davis who was on the same starting tribe as Latimer and Balerdi.
