= Grand Rapids Flight =

- Founded: 2004; 22 years ago
- Folded: 2010; 16 years ago
- League: IBL 2004–2009
- Team history: Grand Rapids Flight (2004–2010)
- Based in: Grand Rapids, Michigan
- Arena: Northpointe Christian High School; 2007; DeltaPlex Arena; 2008; Davenport University; 2009
- Colors: blue, orange, and white
- Owner: Grand Rapids Junior Jammers Youth Foundation
- Coach assistant: Chuck Johnson
- General manager: David Fox
- Championships: 0

The Grand Rapids Flight were a team in the International Basketball League based in Grand Rapids, Michigan.

The Flight underwent an office change in 2007 when David Fox took over the roles of general manager and head coach from founder Tyler Whitcomb. The team was owned by the Grand Rapids Junior Jammers Youth Foundation from 2008 to 2010, a non-profit based in Grand Rapids, Michigan founded by David Fox. The team's head coach, David Fox, coached the team for three seasons, and in his third season was the longest running tenured head coach in the IBL.

On the court, the team was a solid success in 2006, reaching the Final Four. The Grand Rapids Flight at one time held the record for most points scored in a single game, after a 179–146 drubbing of the Des Moines Heat.

The Flight made international news in 2007 by signing 7-foot-9-inch (236 cm) basketball player Sun Mingming, still known as the tallest athlete in the world. The Flight helped to set the record for single game attendance against the Elkhart Express in 2007 as over 5,200 attended the game, many to see Sun.

For the 2008 season the Flight played their home games at the DeltaPlex Arena. The DeltaPlex seats up to 4,400 for basketball. The Flight cited an upturn in attendance for this move.

The Grand Rapids Flight are unrelated to the former basketball team that played in Grand Rapids, the Grand Rapids Hoops.

== Season by season ==
Regular Season
Year	Wins	Losses	Percentage	Division
2005	13	6	.684	3rd – East Division
2006	11	10	.523	T-5th – East Division
2007	5	18	.217	5th – East Division
2008	6	12	.333	3rd – Midwest Division

== All-Stars ==
=== 2005 ===
- Jason Boucher
- Mike Dyson
- Dametrius Kilgore
- James Singleton

=== 2006 ===
- Lamont Barnes
- Duke Cleveland

=== 2007 ===
- Micah Lancaster
- Sun Mingming
