= KPGM =

Radio station in Pawhuska, Oklahoma

- Pawhuska, Oklahoma; United States
- Broadcast area: Bartlesville, Oklahoma
- Frequency: 1500 kHz
- Branding: The Sports Animal

Programming
- Format: Sports
- Affiliations: Fox Sports Radio; WWLS-FM

Ownership
- Owner: Potter Radio, LLC
- Sister stations: KWON, KYFM, KRIG-FM

History
- First air date: April 6, 1964 (as KOSO)
- Former call signs: KOSO (1964–1971); KOKN (1971–1978); KXVQ (1978–1995); KRIG (1995–1996); KOMH (1996–2002)

Technical information
- Licensing authority: FCC
- Facility ID: 17779
- Class: D
- Power: 500 watts day
- Transmitter coordinates: 36°45′42″N 96°11′58″W
- Translator: 99.1 K256CP (Bartlesville)

Links
- Public license information: Public file; LMS
- Webcast: Listen Live
- Website: kpgmradio.com

KPGM (1500 AM) is a radio station broadcasting a sports format. Currently, KPGM is a WWLS The Sports Animal and Fox Sports Radio affiliate. The station is licensed to Pawhuska, Oklahoma, United States, and is currently owned by Potter Radio, LLC. In addition to being heard at 1500 AM and Bartlesvilleradio.com, KPGM simulcasts on KYFM 100.1's HD2 channel and on a translator at 99.1 MHz in Bartlesville.

The FCC first licensed this station to begin operations on April 6, 1964 using callsign KOSO.

== Translators ==
Broadcast translator for KPGM
Call sign	Frequency	City of license	FID	ERP (W)	HAAT	Class	FCC info
K256CP	99.1 FM	Bartlesville, Oklahoma	139222	250	167 m (548 ft)	D	LMS
