= WMRR (AM) =

WMRR (1540 AM) was a radio station in Marshall, Michigan, United States, which broadcast from January 26, 1965, until April 22, 1967. Its short operating history was turbulent. Its studio was destroyed by fire on August 9, 1965, and though it went silent pending a sale, its license was deleted on June 13, 1968. WMRR's frequency was reactivated as KTGG in the 1980s. Neil Rogers broadcast high school basketball for the station.
