= Josh Fines =

Footballer (born 1996)

Personal information
- Full name: Joshua David Fines
- Date of birth: 7 July 1996 (age 30)
- Place of birth: Farnborough, England
- Position: Defender

Team information
- Current team: Memphis City
- Number: 21

College career
Years	Team	Apps	(Gls)
2015–2016	Andrew College	17	(1)
2017–2020	Spring Arbor University	56	(6)

Senior career*
Years	Team	Apps	(Gls)
2012–2013	Camberley Town		
2013–2015	Sandhurst Town		
2016–	Memphis City	3	(0)

International career^{‡}
2016–	British Virgin Islands	2	(0)
- * Club domestic league appearances and goals as of 12:04, 8 June 2017 (UTC) ‡ National team caps and goals as of 12:04, 8 June 2017 (UTC)

Joshua David Fines (born 7 July 1996) is a footballer. Born in England, he represents the British Virgin Islands national team at international level. Besides England, he has played in the United States.

== International career ==
Fines decided to commit to British Virgin Islands Football Association ahead of the 2016 Caribbean Cup.

== Career statistics ==
As of match played 26 March 2016

National team	Year	Apps	Goals
British Virgin Islands	2016	2	0
Total		2	0
