= Rogelio Mills =

American television personality

Rogelio Mills, also known as Roger Mills, a North Carolina native, is a Puerto Rican/Black Hispanic American television personality, author, and recording artist, best known as the host of the celebrity entertainment show entitled "The Roger Mills Show" and author of the book "While Out of My Body I Saw God, Hell and the Living Dead." Mills made national headlines when he launched a lawsuit against rapper Sean Combs, then known as Puff Daddy. Combs had allegedly ordered an assault on Mills and his staff after they refused to turn over a taped interview in which Combs reacted angrily to a question regarding the death of fellow rapper, the Notorious B.I.G.

Mills is the founder and president of Prophetic Outpour Church of Michigan. He is the host of a celebrity inspirational/entertainment program, entitled, The Roger Mills Show, on which he has interviewed numerous celebrity guests. Mills is the founder and president of a publishing company named Triunity Publishing. Mills has announced the November 2011 launch of The Godly Network, which according to its website will be "the World's first multi-channel internet television network, airing 24 hours a day, 7 days a week, in every nation!"

== The Roger Mills Show ==
Rogelio Mills first gained national notoriety as the host of The Roger Mills Show (formerly known as The Roger Mills Show in Video Strobe), a talk entertainment program syndicated across the United States and Canada. The program is known for covering numerous Hollywood premiers and its celebrity guests which have included Michael Jackson, Jackie Chan and Usher. The show was #1 in the Nielsen ratings, for the 2 am time slot, in Detroit, on February 2, 2003. In 2008, Mills announced that his show would in the future be moving to his own internet based network.

== The Missing Children Project ==
Mills founded "The Roger Mills Show-Missing Children Project" in 1990. Originally the project was associated with the Missing Children's Awareness Foundation, which sponsored the song he wrote and recorded entitled, "Missing Children." Several Michigan public schools participated in the project as over 300 students sang backup vocals. The purpose of the song was to raise awareness about the plight of Missing and exploited Children in the United States. Since that time, Mills has continued to use his celebrity to raise awareness about the plight of Missing Children, having received honorary proclamations from Detroit Mayors Dennis Archer, Kwame Kilpatrick, Kenneth Cockrel and David Bing for his efforts. In 2006, while being interviewed on his television program "The Roger Mills Show," the Honorable Governor of Michigan, Jennifer Granholm, as an endorsement, called Dr. Mills a "role model" as a show of support for these endeavors.

== Music ==
In December 2010, Mills released his first POP/R&B single on Phoenix Fire Records. The song was written, composed and produced by Mills, and it is named, "Christmas is not Christmas without you." The song was engineered by multiple Grammy winning record producer Michael J. Powell, who is best known for his work with Anita Baker and the legendary Aretha Franklin. Powell is a longtime friend of Mills and has appeared as a guest several times on his television program. Powell compared Mills' vocals to "the King of Pop" Michael Jackson, stating, "Anyone who loves Michael Jackson are going to love Rogelio Mills!" Mills is also the cousin of Grammy winning recording artist Stephanie Mills. author, and recording artist

== Assault allegations against Sean Combs a.k.a. Diddy ==
During an August 10, 1999 interview with rapper Sean Combs at Radio station WCHQ (105.9) in Detroit, Michigan, Mills asked Combs a question about what was said to be rumors linking the mogul to the death of rapper the Notorious BIG, and Combs immediately ended the interview. However, according to allegations, before being allowed to leave, Mills and his crew were assaulted, and a tape of the interview was taken from them and destroyed. As the story began to circulate local and national news, Combs canceled his "Platinum 2000" party scheduled for the Royal Oak Music Theater (in suburban Detroit), which was to take place on Friday, January 14, 2000. On March 22, 2001, Mills filed a lawsuit against Combs in Wayne County Circuit Court for assault, destruction of property, intentional infliction of emotional distress and a civil conspiracy. For Combs, this was only the latest of a string of legal troubles, immediately following a March 16 acquittal of gun possession and bribery charges stemming from a 1999 nightclub shooting at Club New York. Combs appeared in a Detroit courtroom Wednesday, February 18, 2004, to testify that he did not instruct his handlers to rough up Mills during the 1999 interview. "I knew it was something just about, as far as if I had any role or any feeling about [B.I.G.'s] murder," Combs said. When Combs was asked by his attorney what happened next, he responded, "I just remember ending the interview." The presiding Judge, Wendy Baxter, generated further controversy when she refused to admit a recording that was said to include a taped confession from Ron Gilyard, who was at the time the vice president of Diddy's 'Bad Boy' record label. According to Mills' website, Gilyard stated that Combs ordered him to "get that tape." The Wayne County jury ruled in favor of Combs, citing insufficient evidence. However, Mills appealed. In 2005, the appeals court decided that the recorded telephone conversation between Gilyard and Mills should have been allowed as evidence. However, the court ruled the error was harmless, and that it would not have provided sufficient evidence for the jury that Combs authorized an assault. Despite maintaining that he was a victim of judicial injustice, Mills says that he has moved on. "I have forgiven Mr. Combs." says Mills. "I am praying for him."

== Education ==
M.A. in communication, Spring Arbor University.
