= Bill Dennis =

American racing driver

- Born: William Dennis; December 9, 1935 (age 90); Las Vegas, Nevada, U.S.
- Awards: 1970 NASCAR Grand National Series Rookie of the Year

NASCAR Cup Series career
- 83 races run over 12 years
- Best finish: 18th (1971)
- First race: 1962 Capital City 300 (Richmond)
- Last race: 1981 World 600 (Charlotte)
Wins	Top tens	Poles
0	21	1

Bill Dennis (born December 9, 1935) is an American former NASCAR driver and rookie of the year in the Winston Cup Series.

== Racing career ==
Dennis made his debut at the age of 26 at the 1962 Capital City 300 in the No. 98 and finished fifteenth. After three part-time seasons, he attempted a full-time schedule in 1970 and he had five top-ten finishes for Donlavey Racing. He was given the NASCAR Rookie of the Year award in 1970. He competed full-time for the last time during the following season for Donlavey and had ten top-ten finishes and a pole position. In 1972, he competed for three teams and earned two top-five finishes. He competed in a few races until his last start came in the 1981 World 600.

== Accomplishments ==
Dennis won the Permatex 300 at Daytona three consecutive years (1972–1974), a feat matched only by Dale Earnhardt and Dale Earnhardt Jr., and later surpassed by Tony Stewart, who won four consecutive from 2008 to 2011.

== Personal life ==
Bill's son Ricky Dennis is the founder of Arena Racing USA and also a former stock car driver. He was born in Las Vegas, Nevada but was raised and lived in Tappahannock, Virginia.
