= DeltaPlex Arena =

Former sports facility

The DeltaPlex Arena & Conference Center
- The DeltaPlex

- Interactive map of The DeltaPlex Arena & Conference Center
- Full name: DeltaPlex Arena & Conference Center
- Former names: Grand Rapids Stadium; Stadium Arena; Turner Arena
- Address: 2500 Turner Avenue
- Location: Walker, Michigan
- Coordinates: 43°0′31″N 85°40′54″W
- Owner: Visser Brothers, Inc.
- Capacity: Basketball: 5,000; Concerts: 7,000

Construction
- Built: 1952
- Renovated: 1996–1998
- Closed: July 31, 2022

Tenants
- Grand Rapids Rockets (IHL) (1952–1956); Grand Rapids Owls (IHL) (1977–1980); Grand Rapids Bearcats (NAHL) (1998–2000); Grand Rapids Hoops (CBA) (2001–2003); Grand Rapids Flight (IBL) (2008); West Michigan ThunderHawks (IFL) (2010); Grand Rapids Drive/Gold (NBAGL) (2014–2022)

Website
- Venue Website

The DeltaPlex Arena & Conference Center (formerly the Stadium Arena and Grand Rapids Stadium) was a 5,500-seat multipurpose arena in Walker, Michigan, United States. It was the home of the Grand Rapids Gold of the NBA G League. Built in 1952 as The Stadium Arena, the facility was purchased and renovated in the 1990s and was renamed The DeltaPlex Arena & Conference Center in 1998. The venue hosted many sporting events, political events, national touring concerts, and expos. The arena was a 23,000-square-foot (2,000 m^{2}) space with a 52-foot (16 m) ceiling, and could accommodate up to 8,000 people for concerts. The DeltaPlex was purchased by Visser Brothers Inc. and officially closed on July 31, 2022 to be converted into warehouse space.

== History ==
The original building was constructed in 1952, and was originally named the Stadium Arena. The building had an arched roof design with wooden arch supports instead of steel. The building housed many different tenants including two defunct IHL Hockey teams. The Grand Rapids Rockets in the 1950s and the Grand Rapids Owls in the late 1970s until 1980. During the 1960s and early 1970s it was home to Atlantic Mills Department Store. It was also home for a short time to a drive-in theater, known as the Stadium Drive-In Theater. For most of its life it was located at the corner of Turner Ave. and West River Drive. However, due to a reconstruction of West River Drive, the parking lot was enlarged and Turner Ave. ended at West River Drive.

It was the Grand Rapids area's main indoor entertainment facility until the opening of Van Andel Arena in 1996. In the mid-1990s the building was sold to the Langlois Family. After the purchase an extensive, ground-up restoration and remodeling regimen followed and the newly christened DeltaPlex was born.

The arena served as the Grand Rapids chapter of Arena Racing. It also previously hosted the Grand Rapids Flight of the International Basketball League in 2008. In 2010, the DeltaPlex Arena was home to the West Michigan ThunderHawks of the Indoor Football League.

The DeltaPlex was the home of the Denver Nuggets' NBA G League affiliate, the Grand Rapids Gold.

On April 27, 2022 it was announced that the DeltaPlex Arena would close permanently on July 31, 2022.
