= Arena Racing USA =

Motorsports series

- Sport: Stock car racing
- Jurisdiction: United States
- Founded: 2002; 24 years ago
- Headquarters: Richmond, Virginia
- President: Ricky Dennis

Official website
- www.arenaracingusa.com

Arena Racing USA is an indoor motorsports series founded by former NASCAR chassis builder Ricky Dennis, son of 1970 NASCAR Rookie of the Year, Bill Dennis. The league “went dark” after the 2016–2017 season, per their website.

== History ==
The concept of arena racing started in 1993, when Ricky Dennis was watching a Richmond Renegades hockey game at the Richmond Coliseum. The first attempt at creating the series occurred in 1994, but shut down due to financial troubles. In 2002, a second attempt at the series was created. To assist the series with financial backing, Dennis consulted Joe Gibbs Racing (JGR) owner Joe Gibbs, and also added Interstate Batteries president Norm Miller and PACE Entertainment and PACE Motorsports' Gary Becker as investors. To help promote the series, James Ukrop, former chairman of Ukrop's Food Group, was hired as a business mentor for Dennis. JGR drivers Tony Stewart, Denny Hamlin and J. J. Yeley also became investors. Regarding the series, Stewart stated, "I love any kind of racing, but arena racing struck me as something that could really take off. I've raced Midgets and Sprint Cars indoors, and there's definitely an added level of excitement. When I found out you could do the same thing with a half-scale stock car, but on a banked track with 14 other cars around you while making laps in 10 seconds, I was in."

== Details ==
Arena Racing uses stock cars half-scale of NASCAR Sprint Cup Series cars at 9 feet (2.7 m) long, and can reach speeds up to 50 miles per hour (80 km/h). They weigh about 740 lb (340 kg) and have 22-horsepower engines.

Events are scheduled in a heat style format, as opposed to NASCAR's format of one long race. Each event consists of a minimum of four races: three main races and a "Top Dog" race. The 2011–2012 Arena Racing season ran from November to April, much of which is the offseason of major series such as NASCAR and Formula One. There is currently one venue, the Richmond Coliseum, which hosted the 2013–2014 season races. Every race for Arena Racing USA has been at the Richmond Coliseum or Hampton Coliseum, and Deltaplex Arena.
