= Richard Harry Dennis =

Richard Harry Dennis (1897–1972) was a former Scotland Yard detective chief inspector before becoming the Chief of the British Municipal Police, Tientsin (Tianjin).

== Early life ==
Richard Dennis was born in West Ham, Essex, the son of a local butcher. During World War One he served with the Royal Flying Corps. After the war he joined London’s Metropolitan Police rising to the rank of Detective Sergeant, stationed at Paddington, West London. He was married twice and had one son, Richard Junior.

== British Municipal Police, Tientsin ==
In 1934 Dennis applied to work for the British Municipal Police in the British Concession of the Tientsin (Tianjin) treaty port. He was given the job following a reference from Lord Trenchard, Marshal of the Royal Air Force and Commissioner of the Metropolitan Police. Dennis was appointed Chief Inspector of Police with the British Municipal Council, Tientsin arriving to take up his duties in July 1934 with the new rank of DCI.

During his time as chief of the Tientsin police Dennis investigated the infamous Pamela Werner murder in January 1937 in Beijing. The murder was to be both sensational and revelatory of a number of scandals in Beijing and Tianjin at the time. The murder and Dennis’s investigation are featured in the book Midnight in Peking by Paul French.

Dennis was also a central figure in the so-called Tientsin Incident of June 1939 after the manager of the Japanese-owned Federal Reserve Bank of North China was assassinated by Chinese nationalists at Tientsin’s Grand Theatre in the city’s British Concession. The killers were thought to be hiding out in the British Concession, and the area was surrounded by the Japanese army. The British authorities refused to hand the accused over, the Japanese blockaded the British section. Eventually the Tientsin police were ordered by Sir Robert Craigie, Britain’s Ambassador in Tokyo, to hand over the accused men. DCI Dennis as the senior policeman in Tientsin performed this duty. The Chinese men were all executed by the Japanese on the same day.

Following the Japanese attack on Pearl Harbor, December 7, 1941, on December 8 Dennis was arrested at his home by Japanese soldiers and taken to the Victoria Road Police Station and then placed under house arrest and told to report daily to the Japanese. On December 20 he was formally stripped of his uniform and then told that his services had been terminated and he was to remain under house arrest.

On May 4, 1942, Dennis was arrested once again and this time imprisoned at Japanese Gendarmerie Headquarters for the next 94 days in solitary confinement.

Dennis was accused of espionage and forced to sign a confession – in Japanese - that was never translated to him. Eventually, in early August, the Swiss Consul in Tientsin managed to secure Dennis’s release and repatriation. In a greatly weakened state he was taken to Shanghai and put aboard an overcrowded evacuation ship (the Kamakura Maru) to Lourenço Marques in Portuguese East Africa. From there he was eventually transferred to another ship bound for London.

== Post-War Life ==
In London Dennis was assigned to work for the Ministry of Food. Dennis was assigned to the United Nations War Crimes Commission International Military Tribunal for the Far East and sent back to Asia to work on the trials of senior Japanese military personnel, a list that included those who had imprisoned him in Tientsin. Dennis returned again to England after the tribunals. He divorced and married a third time, ran a hotel in West London called The Dennis that had an active bridge club, ran several pubs in the area and was regularly to be seen propping up the bar at the Chepstow Arms near Notting Hill Gate. Dick Dennis died in 1972 at seventy five years of age.
