= KYFM =

Radio station in Bartlesville, Oklahoma

- Bartlesville, Oklahoma; United States
- Broadcast area: Tulsa, Oklahoma
- Frequency: 100.1 MHz (HD Radio)
- Branding: "Bright Star 100.1"

Programming
- Format: Adult contemporary
- Subchannels: HD2: Classical
- Affiliations: Premiere Networks

Ownership
- Owner: KCD Enterprises, Inc.
- Sister stations: KWON; KPGM; KRIG-FM

History
- First air date: November 6, 1961
- Call sign meaning: K Your Favorite Music

Technical information
- Licensing authority: FCC
- Facility ID: 36005
- Class: C2
- ERP: 25,000 watts
- HAAT: 212 meters (696 ft)
- Transmitter coordinates: 36.62833°N 96.19056°W

Links
- Public license information: Public file; LMS
- Webcast: Listen live
- Website: www.bartlesvilleradio.com/pages/kyfm-brightstar-100-1

KYFM (100.1 FM) is a radio station in Bartlesville, Oklahoma, United States. The station broadcasts an adult contemporary format and is owned by KCD Enterprises, Inc. KYFM also airs a classical music format on 100.1 HD-2.
