= KWON =

- Bartlesville, Oklahoma; United States
- Frequency: 1400 kHz

Programming
- Format: News/Talk

Ownership
- Owner: Kcd Enterprises, Inc.
- Sister stations: KPGM, KYFM, KRIG

History
- Call sign meaning: KWON sounding like ONE

Technical information
- Licensing authority: FCC
- Facility ID: 36004
- Class: C
- Power: 1,000 watts unlimited
- Transmitter coordinates: 36°45′53″N 95°57′35″W
- Translators: (93.3 MHz) K227CQ (Bartlesville) (95.1 MHz) K236CT (Pawhuska)

Links
- Public license information: Public file; LMS
- Webcast: Listen live
- Website: Station website

KWON (1400 AM) is a radio station licensed to Bartlesville, Oklahoma, United States. It carries a News/Talk format. The station is currently owned by Kcd Enterprises, Inc.

== Translators ==
| Call sign | Frequency | City of license | FID | ERP (W) | HAAT | Class | FCC info |
|---|---|---|---|---|---|---|---|
| K227CQ | (93.3 MHz) FM | Bartlesville, Oklahoma | 157135 | 250 | 144 m (472 ft) | D | LMS |
| K236CT | (95.1 MHz) FM | Pawhuska, Oklahoma | 201601 | 250 | 0 m (0 ft) | D | LMS |
