= Spring Arbor University =

Free Methodist university in Spring Arbor, Michigan, US

Coordinates: 42°12′21″N 84°33′17″W

- Former names: Spring Arbor Seminary (1873–1929); Spring Arbor Seminary and Junior College (1929–1960); Spring Arbor College (1960–2001)
- Motto: Fides, Vivens, Discens (Latin)
- Motto in English: Faith, Living, Learning
- Type: Private university
- Established: 1873; 153 years ago
- Accreditation: Higher Learning Commission
- Religious affiliation: Free Methodist Church
- Endowment: $19.2 Million (2019)
- President: Brent Ellis
- Academic staff: 46 Full-time, 52 Part-time (2025)
- Students: 2,468 (2025)
- Undergraduates: 1,133 (2025)
- Postgraduates: 1,335 (2025)
- Location: 106 E. Main Street, Spring Arbor, Michigan, U.S.
- Campus: Rural
- Colors: Navy Blue & Yellow
- Nickname: Cougars
- Sporting affiliations: NAIA – Crossroads; NCCAA Division I – Midwest
- Mascot: Cougar
- Website: www.arbor.edu

Spring Arbor University (SAU) is a private Free Methodist university in Spring Arbor, Michigan, United States. Developing from an earlier academy and junior college, in 1963 it began offering bachelor's degrees. Attaining university status in 1994, it is the second-largest evangelical Christian university in Michigan. The university is accredited by the Higher Learning Commission.

== History ==
Spring Arbor University developed in the late 20th century from a seminary founded in 1873 by leaders of the Free Methodist Church, particularly Edward Payson Hart. First Spring Arbor Seminary was established as a private academy for elementary and secondary grades. Located near the site of a former Potawatomi Indian village, the academy was built on property that formerly belonged to Central Michigan College (later renamed as Hillsdale College after moving to that city).

In 1923, the board of trustees voted to add a junior college to the academy. In 1929, the school was renamed as Spring Arbor Seminary and Junior College. Primary and intermediate classes were discontinued in 1930.

In 1960, the school gained accreditation by the North Central Association of Colleges and Schools, and the trustees changed the name of the institution to Spring Arbor College. The high school program was dropped, and Spring Arbor launched its four-year program in 1963.

In 1981, Spring Arbor began offering the first of its degree completion programs for adult learners in nearby Jackson. The college later developed degrees in health-related fields and opened sites in Lansing and Flint, Michigan. Graduate education classes began at Spring Arbor in 1994. In 2001, the school changed its name to Spring Arbor University.

A marker designating the college as a Michigan Historic Site was erected by the Michigan Historical Commission in 1963. The inscription reads:

Three Michigan institutions of higher education have had their roots here. The predecessor of Albion College, the Spring Arbor Seminary was chartered in 1835. Michigan Central College, founded in 1844, was located here until its removal in 1855 when it became Hillsdale College. Spring Arbor was opened by free Methodists in 1873 as an academy with elementary and secondary grades. In 1928 the elementary program was discontinued when a junior college was officially introduced. The high school was terminated in 1961 when a senior college was proposed. In September 1963, the first junior class was accepted into the regionally accredited four-year liberal arts college. Throughout its history, the Spring Arbor Faculty and students have been dedicated to "the serious study of the liberal arts, commitment to Jesus Christ as a perspective for learning and participation in the campus community and the contemporary world."

== Academics ==
Undergraduate admissions statistics
- 2018 entering class
- Admit rate: 70.9 (832 out of 1,173)
- Yield rate: 23.1 (192 out of 832)

Test scores middle 50%
- SAT Total: 1025-1230 (among 78% of FTFs)
- ACT Composite: 20-27 (among 36% of FTFs)

SAU offers over 70 majors and programs at the undergraduate level at its main campus in Spring Arbor, Michigan. Its most popular undergraduate majors, in terms of 2021 graduates, were:

Social Work (82)
Nursing Administration (67)
Operations Management & Supervision (40)
Business Administration & Management (24)
Sports, Kinesiology & Physical Education/Fitness (18)
General Studies (17)

Spring Arbor University also offers online undergraduate degree options including Associate of Arts and Associate of Science in business, Bachelor of Science in business, Bachelor of Science in Management, Bachelor of Social Work, and Bachelor of Science in Nursing.

In regard to graduate programs, SAU offers Master of business administration, Master of Arts in education, Master of Science in management, Master of Science in nursing, Master of Arts in social work and Master of Arts in counseling degrees.

The university is a member of the Council for Christian Colleges and Universities and is affiliated with the Free Methodist Church. The university is accredited by the Higher Learning Commission. SAU also holds accreditation from the National Council for Accreditation of Teacher Education.

In the late 1980s, Michael A. O'Donnell, Ph.D. and Nick Stinnett, Ph.D. (professor with the University of Alabama) co-founded The International Family Life Institute, Inc., Montgomery, Alabama, which was hired by SAU to help them pioneer the first B.S. degree completion program in Family Life Education on the campus of Spring Arbor University leading to certification for professionals as Certified Family Life Educators (CFLE)

In 2020, the university terminated the contracts of 11 faculty, including several tenured faculty. In response, the faculty passed a vote of no confidence in the VPAA.

== Student life ==
As of Fall 2018, total enrollment included 3,436 students. Of this, 1,145 are on campus, 662 are enrolled in professional studies, and 1,629 are graduate students. By Fall 2021, on campus enrollment had fallen to 961. There are roughly 42 denominations represented on the campus. About 84 percent of students are from Michigan, 15 percent are from 22 other states, and 1 percent are international.

Spring Arbor University has two radio stations: 106.9 HOME.fm and 89.3 The Arbor. 89.3 The Arbor has been previously known as 89.3 The Vibe and 89.3 The Message.

With a strong emphasis on spiritual life, Spring Arbor University requires that all students attend a chapel service on Mondays and Wednesdays at 10:05 am. This service includes student-led worship and speakers are pastors, entrepreneurs, professors and missionaries, handpicked by the Chaplain to bring their message to the SAU community. Aside from Chapel, there are campus groups and events designed to grow the spiritual life of students including Spiritual Life Retreat, small groups, and the Community of Learners program. SAU also hosts a one-day event annually called The Focus Series. During this day, classes are canceled and various workshops and seminars are held on campus. Speakers have included emergent church spokesperson and author Brian McLaren.

== Discrimination against LGBTQ people ==
Spring Arbor University has faced numerous accusations of discrimination against LGBTQ students and faculty members. One such instance took place in 2007, when a faculty member was terminated after coming out as transgender.

In the fall of 2017, a speaker at SAU's twice-weekly chapel service was met with applause after placing LGBTQ people in the same category as drug addicts and murderers. His sermon stated: "I don't have time to tell you the stories of lesbians that come to our church and repent of their sins and now are living straight lives. I don't have time to tell you about murderers who walk in and they get changed by the power of God, I can't tell you the drug dealers who actually hand me drugs and say, 'I don't want to do this anymore.' And it's not by my might, it's not by my power, it is by the spirit of the Lord."

In 2018, Dr. Everett Piper (an alumnus, former SAU administrator, and former president of Oklahoma Wesleyan University) posted what the New York Times referred to as "a long, vitriolic response to stories in The Pulse, a student news source at his alma mater, Spring Arbor University in Michigan, in which gay students were seeking affirmation and conversation." In this statement, Piper compared LGBTQ students to white supremacists, saying "How about 'a conversation about how to bring feelings of white supremacy and faith into the light' at the local Christian college?" he wrote. Why, he asked, "do we 'normalize' one sinful habit and predisposition but yet still condemn another?"

The SAU student handbook currently prohibits "same-sex dating behaviors," and states that those who violate this community standard will be offered "counsel and support to encourage students towards living lives consistent with the biblical teaching on sexuality," and may also be subject to suspension or dismissal. It also states that students' clothing must be "gender-appropriate" and that the university "will not support persistent or conspicuous expressions or actions that are deliberately discordant with birth gender."

SAU was granted a Title IX exemption in 2014, allowing the university to discriminate on religious grounds, which it still holds today.

== Athletics ==
The Spring Arbor athletic teams are called the Cougars. The university is a member of the National Association of Intercollegiate Athletics (NAIA), primarily competing in the Crossroads League (formerly known as the Mid-Central College Conference (MCCC) until after the 2011–12 school year) since the 2004–05 academic year. They were also a member of the National Christian College Athletic Association (NCCAA), primarily competing as an independent in the Midwest Region of the Division I level. The Cougars previously competed in the Wolverine–Hoosier Athletic Conference (WHAC) from 1992–93 to 2003–04.

Spring Arbor competes in 18 intercollegiate varsity sports: Men's sports include baseball, basketball, bowling, cross country, golf, soccer, tennis and track & field; while women's sports include basketball, bowling, cross country, golf, soccer, softball, tennis, track & field and volleyball; and co-ed sports include cheerleading.

=== Competitive cheer/dance ===
In the 2019–20 season, Spring Arbor's competitive cheer and dance teams participated in their first competitions, introducing co-ed sports to the school.

=== Accomplishments ===
The women's soccer team won the 2015, 2017 & 2022 NAIA National Championships. After a 42-game unbeaten streak, the women were the 2016 NAIA National Champion runners-up. The 2019 men's basketball team was the NAIA Division II National Champions.

== Notable alumni ==
- Michael Ashford
- Bethany Balcer
- Rick Baxter
- Heidi Campbell
- Sam Costentino
- Jake Crull
- Keith A. Elford
- Josh Fines
- Donald Gould
- Wendell Harrison
- Jennell Jaquays
- Lewis Jones
- Micah Lancaster
- Nathan Martin
- Babbie Mason
- Rogelio Mills
- Gayle Moran
- Mike Nofs
- Richard Morthland
- Everett Piper
- Xavier Prather
- Mary Taylor Previte
- Arleta Richardson
- Steven Waterhouse
