= WSAE =

Coordinates: 42.154°N 84.549°W

- Spring Arbor, Michigan; United States
- Broadcast area: Jackson, Michigan
- Frequency: 106.9 MHz
- Branding: The Arbor FM

Programming
- Format: Christian adult contemporary

Ownership
- Owner: Spring Arbor University

History
- First air date: June 29, 1963
- Call sign meaning: Spring Arbor

Technical information
- Licensing authority: FCC
- Facility ID: 61994
- Class: A
- ERP: 3,900 watts
- HAAT: 102 meters

Links
- Public license information: Public file; LMS
- Webcast: Listen live

WSAE (106.9 FM) is a non-commercial radio station located in Spring Arbor, Michigan. The station is owned by Spring Arbor University.

WSAE began broadcasting in 1963 as a 10-watt college station on 89.3 MHz. Power was increased to 1,000 watts in February 1971 and 3,100 watts in April 1977. The station moved to 106.9 MHz in October 1991 with 2,900 watts. In December 1993 WSAE made a final increase to 3,900 watts.

On May 18, 2005 the station switched from a contemporary Christian format to HOME.fm. HOME.fm plays a mixture of mainstream adult contemporary and contemporary Christian music. The former format, known as Power Praise FM, was moved to sister station WJKN-FM, which adopted a Christian Hit Radio format as "The Vibe" (later changed to the current Christian AC format as "The Message"). From Thanksgiving Day through December 31 WSAE broadcasts Christmas music around the clock.

Home.FM originally played such Soft AC artists as Lionel Richie, Amy Grant, and Sade, but the music mix has changed to more of a Hot/Modern AC mix since. Typical mainstream artists heard on the station now include the likes of U2, Jack Johnson, Taylor Swift, Tolmachevy Sisters, Of Monsters and Men, Coldplay, Ingrid Michaelson, Michael Bublé, Regina Spektor and Kelly Clarkson. Mainstream artists make up the bulk of the playlist, but the station does still play a few Christian songs an hour by artists such as Jeremy Camp, Francesca Battistelli, Brandon Heath, Shawn McDonald, Jamie Grace and Needtobreathe.

Home.fm programming was also heard on sister station WJKN-FM 89.3 Spring Arbor and a network of translators across south-central Michigan until September 21, 2020, when WJKN-FM and the translator network broke away for a student-hosted, all-Christian music format branded as 89.3 The Arbor. WSAE continues as the sole frequency for Home.fm, which continues its signature blend of secular and Christian pop and alternative music. Other former translators in Adrian, Lansing and Somerset were sold to other broadcasters long before the program separation.

On October 8, 2026, WSAE assumed the programming of WJKN-FM, which flipped to Christian preaching as "Strong Tower Radio".
