= Clark County Fair =

Annual ten-day event

Coordinates: 45°44′53″N 122°39′49″W

- Genre: Fair
- Location: Ridgefield, Washington
- Years active: 1868–1916; 1919–41; 1946–2019; 2022–
- Website: http://www.clarkcofair.com/

The Clark County Fair is an annual ten-day event held at the Clark County Event Center at the Fairgrounds in Ridgefield, Washington. There were no fairs in 2020-21, but in August 2022 it resumed.

== History ==
Established in 1868, the first Clark County Fair was held in Esther Short Park.

The Clark County Fair is the largest single venue event in the Portland metropolitan area family entertainment market. Attracting over 260,000 attendees each year, this event has been recognized locally as the Best Outdoor Event/Festival in the area.

No fair was held in those years: 1917–18 because of World War I, 1942–45 because of World War II, and 2020-21 due to the COVID-19 pandemic.
