= St. John's Conservatory Theater =

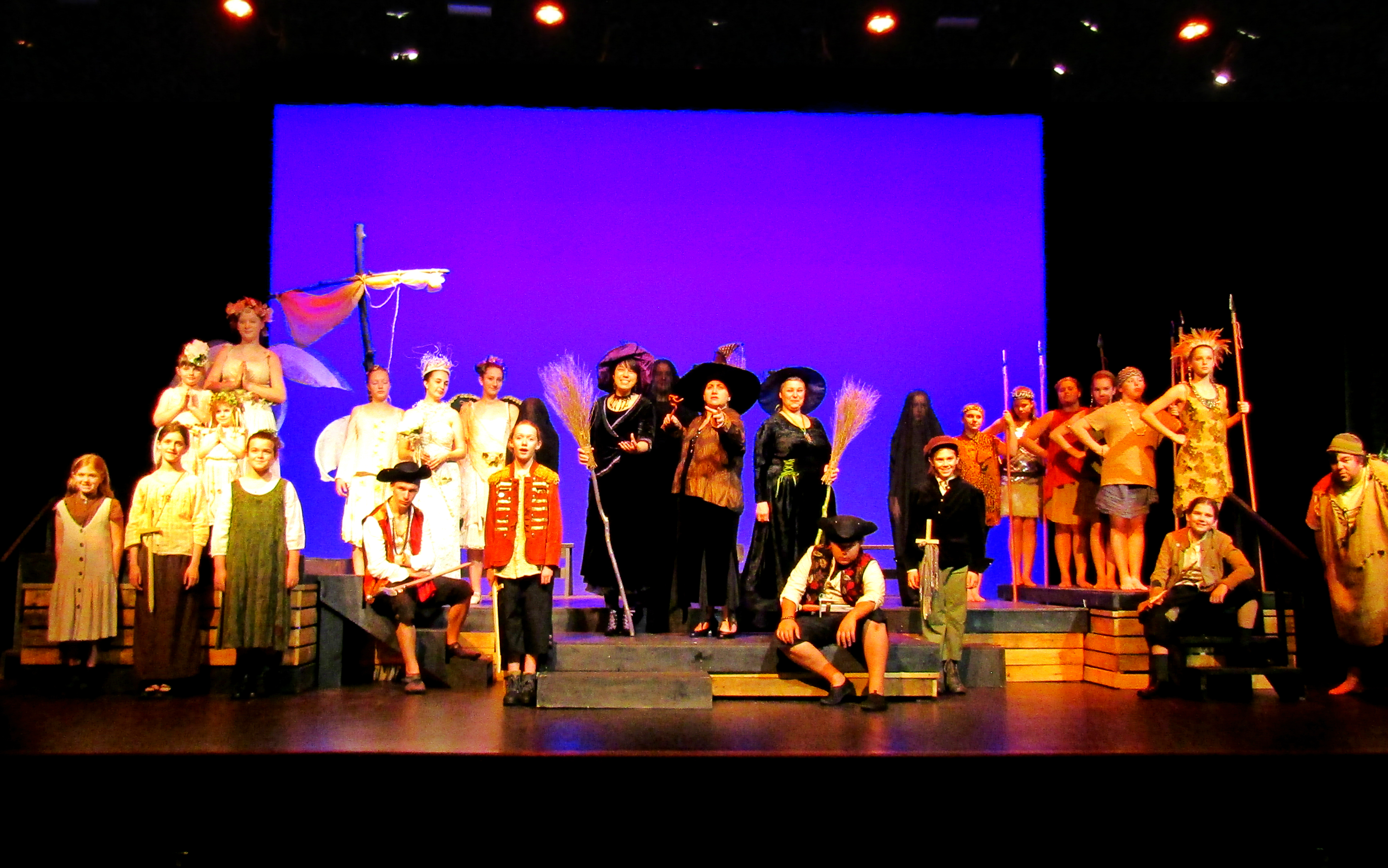
- Orchard of Hide & Seek
- Formation: 2014
- Type: Theatre group
- Purpose: Regional Theater
- Location: Ogdensburg, New York
- Artistic director: Richard O'Donnell
- Website: facebook.com/stjohnsconservatorytheater

St. John's Conservatory Theater (SJCT) was a not-for-profit theater company at the St. John's Episcopal Church in Ogdensburg, NY.

== History ==
In 2014, Michael A. O'Donnell, St. John's Church rector invited his brother Richard O'Donnell, who founded several theatre companies including New Age Vaudeville, The New Variety, and the Black Pearl Cabaret, to produce and create a theatre in the St. John's Parish Hall located on the corner of Knox and Franklin, Ogdensburg, NY.

Richard O'Donnell (principal founder) then recruited several church members including Stephen Chambers, Angela Dwyer, Christopher Dwyer, and Ryan Woodard (along with Michael O'Donnell, accredited as co-founder) to mount the first production.

R. O'Donnell initially produced, wrote and directed a readers theater-style interactive show titled Alice Isn't All There which eventually developed into full-scale musical comedy productions.

He continued producing at the St. John's Parish Theater until June 2017 where productions were relocated to the all-digital 900+ seat George Hall Auditorium – OFA, 1100 State Street, Ogdensburg, NY.

The theater officially closed in 2019.

== Theatrical Genre ==
St. John's Conservatory Theater's theatrical genres include musical theatre, satire, interactive theatre, improvisational theatre, variety show, circus, and vaudeville. St. John's Conservatory Theater incorporates these genres in all-original musical comedies written by Richard O'Donnell and based on literature, folklore, and legend. Their production and costume design are "reminiscent of Tim Burton’s Gothic ingenuity." Adaptations such as Alice's Adventures in Wonderland, The Legend of Sleepy Hollow, A Christmas Carol, and Oliver Twist have been presented as well as folklore such as the musical Orchard Of Hide & Seek, based on the Celtic Folk Tales of the 1800s.

== Digital Orchestrations ==
St. John's Conservatory Theater takes the composer's score and produces a digital orchestration that is played over a complex sound system. The cast then sing to the score to great effect in front of a live audience.

The digital orchestrations emulate the instrumental sounds of a full orchestra, often adding sound effects and vocal enhancements, as well.

== Notable Productions ==
- Alice Isn't All There - book, music, lyrics by B. R. Kreep
- Twist - book, music, lyrics by B. R. Kreep
- Orchard of Hide & Seek - book, music, lyrics by Richard O'Donnell
- A Kreepy Christmas Carol - book, music, lyrics by B. R. Kreep
- Mr. Scrooge - book, music, lyrics by B. R. Kreep
- Kreepy Hollow - book, music, lyrics by B. R. Kreep

== Principal Creative Staff ==
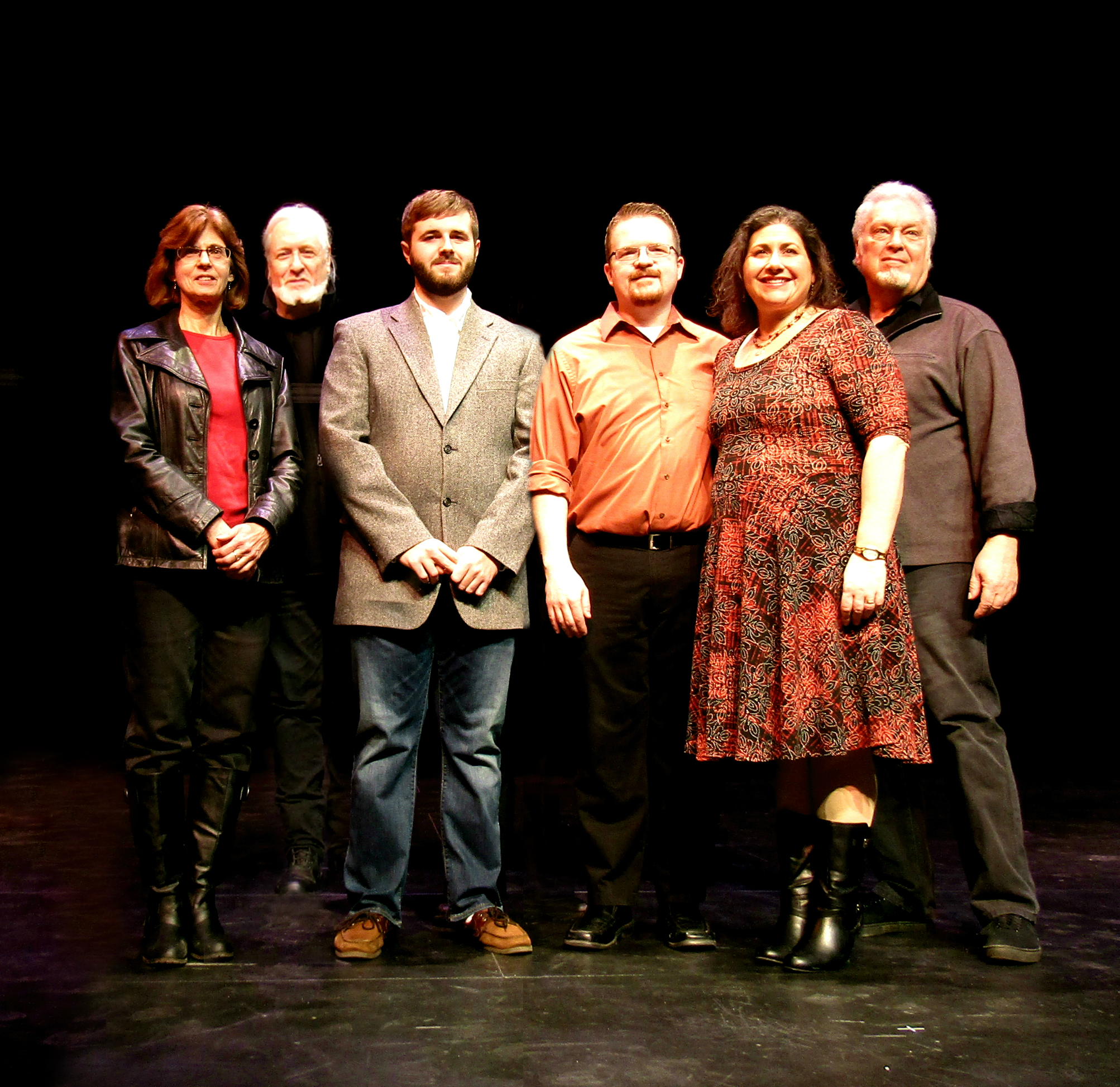
SJCT Creative Staff

St. John's Conservatory Theater principal creative staff includes producing artistic director Richard O’Donnell, musical director and choreographer Angela Conzone Dwyer, digital orchestrator and vocal arranger Ryan C. McNally, scenic and Prop Designer Stephen Chambers, costume and makeup designer Karen Fischbeck, and technical director and production coordinator Christopher Dwyer. Collectively they have over five decades of professional theatrical and academic experience including regional, stock, bus and truck, off-off-Broadway, off-Broadway, and Broadway stages.

Other creative staff are senior costumer Heron Hetzler, assistant costumer Ann Losurdo, sound designer Richard Patton, lighting designer Barry Pratt, and props master Tonya Ott.

Photo: (L-R) Karen Fischbeck, Richard O'Donnell, Ryan C. McNally, Christopher Dwyer, Angela Conzone Dwyer, Stephen Chambers

== St. John’s Parish Theater Productions ==
=== Alice Isn’t All There ===
St. John's Conservatory Theater (JCT) presented an original musical comedy "Alice Isn’t All There", a 90-minute theatrical with book, music, and lyrics accredited to Richard O'Donnell's nom de plume Brazillia R. Kreep. “Alice Isn't All There” is an adaptation on Lewis Carroll’s classic “Alice's Adventures in Wonderland.” It was presented by the St. John's Conservatory Theater on October 10, 11, 17, 18, 24, 25, 2014 at the St. John's Parish Theater in the city of Ogdensburg, NY.

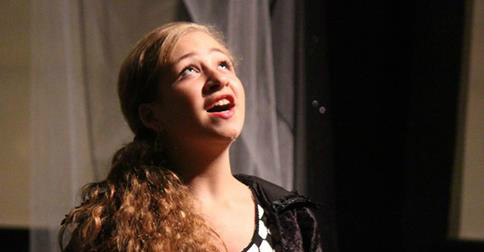
Alice Isn't All There

Alice Isn’t All There was executive produced by rector Michael O’Donnell, produced and directed was by Richard O'Donnell, musical direction by Angela Conzone Dwyer, and digital orchestrations by Pat Duffy. Original Alice costumes where created by Ann Losurdo, set and props were hand-crafted by fine artist Stephen Chambers. Other production team included Christopher Dwyer (Technical Director), Alynia Hermaine Rule (stage manager).

The cast included Allexa Hooper as Alice Brimble, Hailey Weber as Alice Liddle, Paige Merz as the Cheshire Cat, Sloane Ryan as Boo Hoo and the Caterpillar, Steve Summers as Itsy Bitsy, Deanna Bellinger as the Dormouse, Bill LaMere as the Jack Rabbit, Angela Conzone Dwyer as the Queen of Hearts and Mrs. Zizzlebot, Christopher Dwyer as Tweedledee and Mr. Zizzlebot, Ryan Woodard as Tweedledum, Joel Burke as The Narrator, and Richard O’Donnell as Belvedere Brumbleton, Derk Powers, The Knave of Hearts, and the Mad Hatter.

The story of Alice is told by the Bells & Wheezle Circus Company, a European-style commedia dell’arte and runs 90 minutes. A contemporary Alice finds herself in Wonderland haunted by the Victorian Alice while interacting with all the usual classic characters.

Original songs included The Bells & Wheezle Circus, Tic Toc, Wish Myself, We're All Mad Here, Not For Me, The Oswegatchie, All Hail the Queen/Off with His Head, and Many Reflections.

Photo: Allexa Hooper as Alice sings Wish Myself in Alice Isn't All There

=== A Kreepy Christmas Carol ===
St. John's Conservatory Theater (SJCT) presented “A Kreepy Christmas Carol,” a musical comedy adaptation on the Charles Dickens’ classic “A Christmas Carol" with book, music, and lyrics by Richard O'Donnell's nom de plume Brazillia R. Kreep. It was presented by the St. John's Conservatory Theatre on December 6, 12, 13, 19 and 20, 2014 at the St. John's Parish House in the city of Ogdensburg, NY.

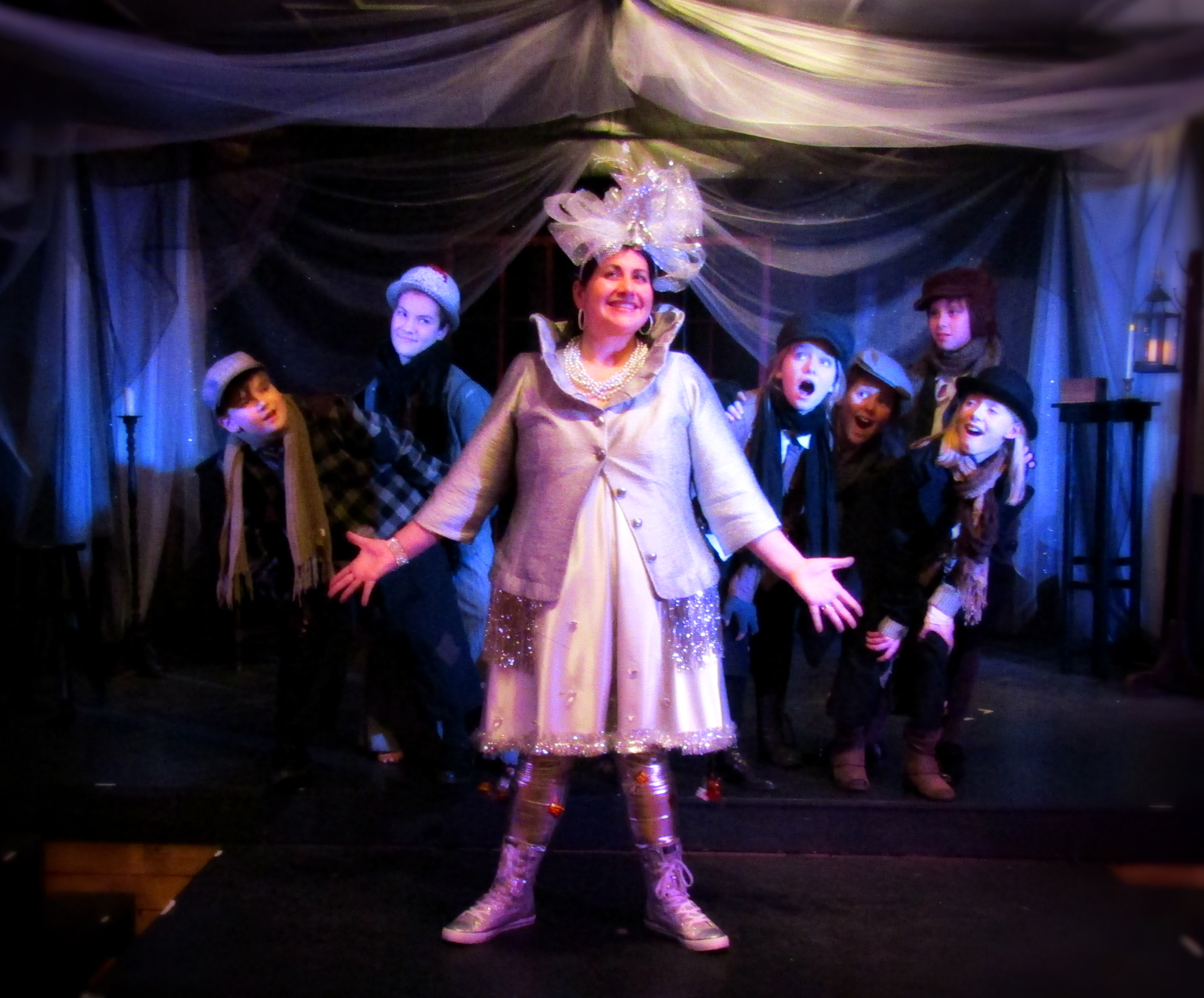
A Kreepy Christmas Carol

A Kreepy Christmas Carol was produced and directed by Richard O'Donnell, musical direction by Angela Conzone Dwyer, digital orchestrations by Ryan C. McNally, technical direction by Christopher Dwyer. Original costumes and makeup were created by Ann Losurdo and Maggie Gebo, set and props were hand-crafted by fine artist Stephen Chambers.

The cast (in order of appearance) Sloane Ryan as Nipper, Makayla Lovely as Abby, Hailey Weber as Letty, Jillian LeBel as Gusie, Elizabeth Bascom as Trudy, Cole Siebels as Cager, Anton Skamperle as Ollie, Dee Bellinger as Zinger and Tiny Tina, Christopher Dwyer as Bob Cratchit, R O’Donnell as Scrooge, Brad Mintener as Jacob Marley, Rebecca Bascom as the Ghost of Been There Done That, Ryan Woodard as Fezziwig, Angela Conzone Dwyer as the Ghost of Christmas Presents, and a surprise guest each night as the Ghost of Christmas Yet to Come.

Original songs included Kreepy Overture, Counting Silver, So Happy Happy, To Be a Zombie, Ghost of Been There Done That, Heed Our Warning, I Hear The Bells A Ringing, and Wish.

Photo: Angela Conzone Dwyer as the Ghost of Christmas Presents and the street urchins sing I Hear The Bells A Ringing in A Kreepy Christmas Carol

=== Orchard of Hide & Seek ===
St. John’s Conservatory Theater presented “Orchard of Hide & Seek,” on July 9 – 12 and 16th – 19th, 2015. It featured an original story and songs written, produced, and directed by Richard O’Donnell. With musical direction by Angela Conzone Dwyer and Ryan C. McNally, digital arrangements by Ryan C. McNally, choreography by Johanna Carmany, set and prop designs by Stephen Chambers, costumes and makeup by Ann Losurdo and Karen Fischbeck Carmany, technical direction and production coordination by Christopher Dwyer, and stage managed by Sadie Smith.

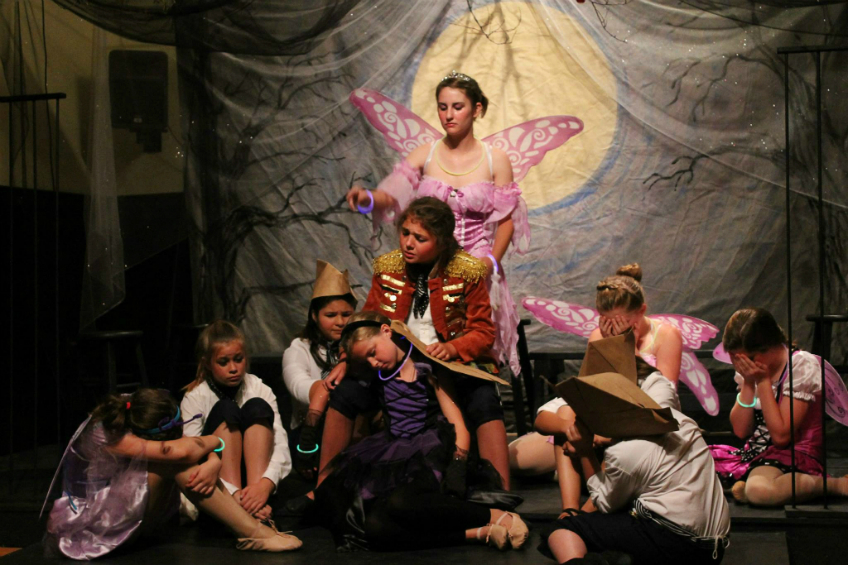
Orchard of Hide & Seek

The cast included Taylor Morrill as fairy Queen Gossamer, Myah Myers as Battyboo, Hailey Weber as Stargleam, Emily Gardner as Raindew, Meghan Gardner as Heartglow, Sloane Ryan as Prixy Pringle, Madalyn Bascom as Trixy Tringle, Caitlin Kelly as Ariah Ropidy, Payten Walsh as Opidy Dobity, Grace Wills as Zopidy Yopity, R O’Donnell as pirate Capt. Jean-Pierre Beunet, Stefanie Jones as Scallywag, Lizette Haenel as Shivers, Rebecca Bascom as Ophelia Hollyhock the evil Witch of Hubbub, Angela Conzone Dwyer as Misty Cauldron, and Ryan Woodard as Bob the juggling Troll.

The story of the “Orchard of Hide & Seek” concerns Queen Gossamer and her eclectic band of fairies that inhabit the old apple orchard on top of the cliffs overlooking the St. Lawrence Sea. They are preparing for their spectacular Midsummer's Eve celebration when the children of Ennui (the tiny village that surrounds the bottom of the cliff) are playing their annual games of hide and seek. However, unbeknownst to any of them, all are in danger of the Pirate Capt. Jean-Pierre Beunet, Ophelia the Queen Witch of Hubbub, and her cauldron Misty who want to take over the entire Orchard for themselves.

Songs included: The Orchard of Hide & Seek, Dip-pity Day, Sailors of St. Labyrinth, Believe, Yo Ho Ho, The Regal C'est la Vie, Ophelia's Brew, Ready or Not, Hide & Seek, Poison, Come All Ye Children, Doom, All Around You

Photo: Sloane Ryan as Prixy Pringle sings Believe to Myah Myers as the pixie Battyboo in Orchard of Hide & Seek

=== Kreepy Hallow ===
Kreepy Hallow is a musical comedy adaptation of Washington Irving’s classic short story “The Legend of Sleepy Hollow" with book, music, and lyrics penned under O’Donnell’s nom de plume B. R. Kreep. It was presented by the St. John's Conservatory Theater on October 16, 17, 18, 23, 24 and 25, 2016 at the St. John's Parish Theater in the city of Ogdensburg, NY. executive produced and Directed by O'Donnell, musical direction and choreography by Angela Conzone Dwyer with arrangements and digital orchestrations by Ryan C. McNally, and technical direction and production coordination by Christopher Dwyer. Original costumes and makeup design were created by Karen Fischbeck Carmany with additional costumes made by Ann Losurdo with set and props hand-crafted by fine artist Stephen Chambers.

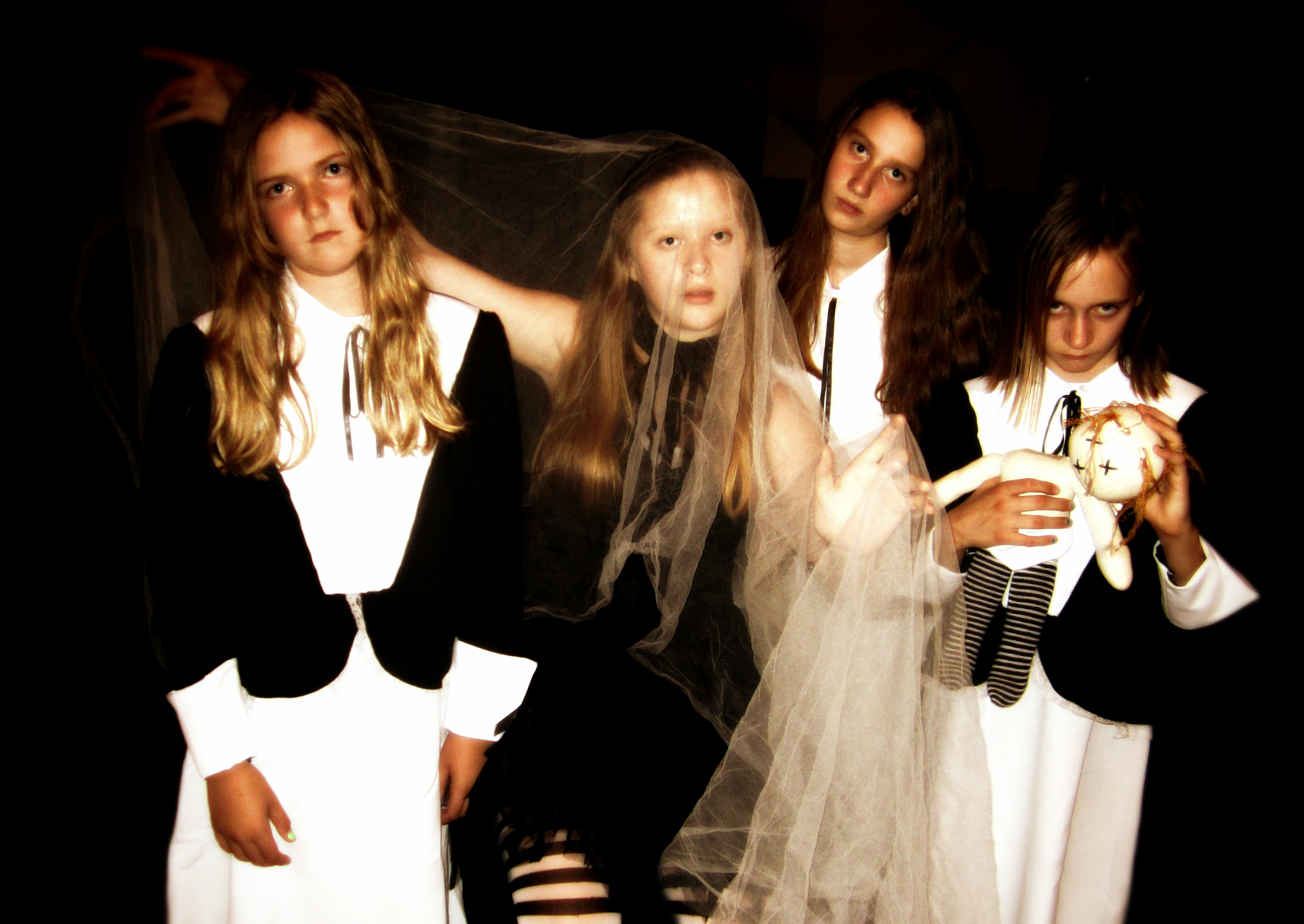
Kreepy Hallow

Kreepy Hallow stars Hailey Weber as Parthenia Goste, Dee Bellinger as Etta Hobbs, Jillian LeBel as Alia Hobbs, Grace Brunet as Abitha Hobbs, O’Donnell as narrator Brazillia R. Kreep, Angela Conzone Dwyer as Ichaboda Krane, Cole Siebels as Thaddeus Frye, Myah Myers as Felicity Caldwell, Christopher Rodriguez as Abner Frye, Haley Dawley as Mercy Faith, Grace Wills as Oheo Seneca, Meghan Gardner as Chasity Smyth, Emma Murray as Charity Smyth, Christopher Dwyer as Bartholomeus Van tassel, Shelly Murdock as Electra Van Brunt, and Ryan Woodard as the Town Crier.

Story synopsis: Kreepy Hallow is set in the 1860s along the St. Lawrence River, when the first appointed female teacher, Miss Ichaboda Krane, takes over the ghostly schoolroom built on-top of a sacred Iroquois burial ground. With a classroom filled with eclectic children, her “eye” on Bartholomeus Van Tassel, a few unexpected guests, and a jealous local woman Electra Van Brunt watching her every move, Miss Ichaboda Krane's Halloween celebration turns into a most haunting affair. Narrated by B. R. Kreep, Kreepy Hallow tells the tale of Ichaboda Krane's encounter with all things that go bump in the night as the dreadful Headless Horseman rides again.

Original songs included Halloween, Welcome to my Lighthouse, See Me, Kreepy Hallow, Proper Peace of Mind, Ballad of the Headless Horseman, I’m Lamenting, Ode to Wealth, and A Horseman. Additional period music included Shall We Gather at the River by Robert Lowry, Battle Hymn of the Republic, lyrics by Julia Ward Howe, music by William Steffe, and The Funeral March of a Marionette (Marche funèbre d'une marionnette) by Charles Gounod.

Photo: Jillian LeBel as Alia Hobbs, Hailey Weber as Parthenia Goste, Grace Brunet as Abitha Hobbs and Dee Bellinger as Etta Hobbs in Kreepy Hallow

=== Alice Isn’t All There Re-staged ===
Alice Isn't All There was remounted and presented by St. John's Conservatory Theater at the St. John's Parish Theater on June 3, 4, 5, 17, 18, and 19, 2016 with an extended book, music, and lyrics accredited to playwright and composer Richard O'Donnell's nom de plume B. R. Kreep. The sets and props were re-designed by fine artist Stephen Chambers and principal cast costumes re-designed by Karen Fischbeck and built in Ogdensburg, New York and the Prague, Czech Republic.

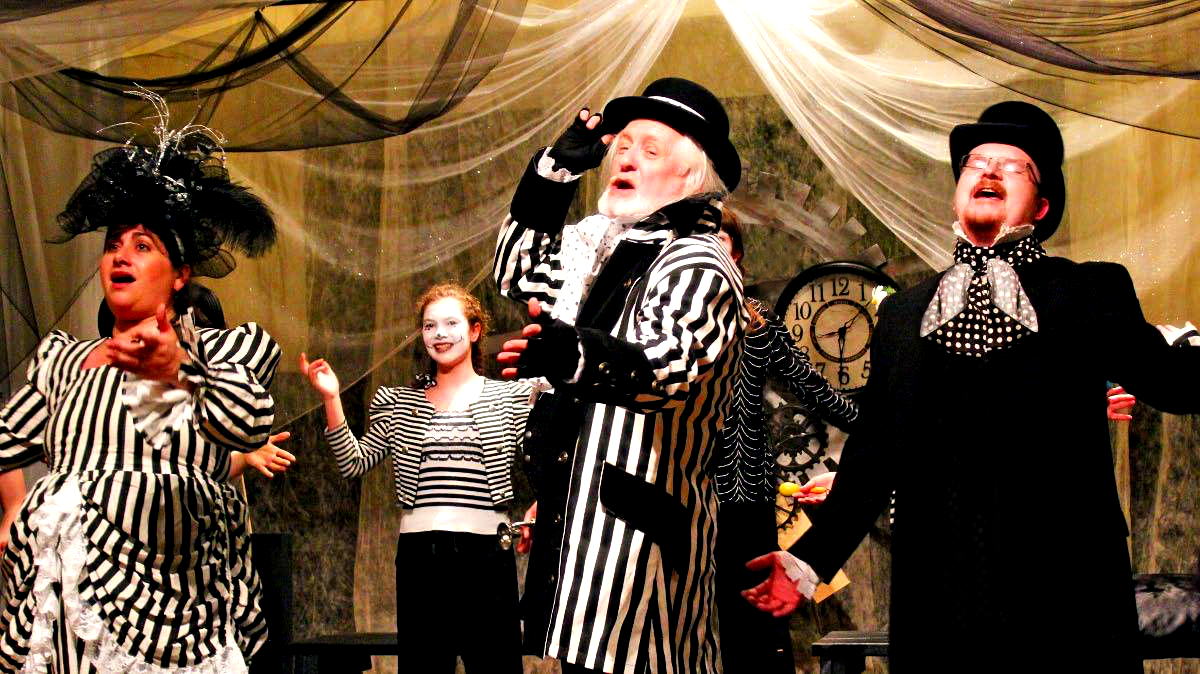
Alice Isn't All There - St. John's Parish Theatre

The story of Alice Isn't All There concerns a steampunk-style Bells & Wheezle Circus Company, who set up their tent alongside the St. Lawrence River. There, under the big top, they perform their version of the famous story Lewis Carroll's Alice's Adventures In Wonderland. After plucking their contemporary Alice (played by Elizabeth Peo) from the audience, she finds herself in a Wonderland of trouble, haunted by the original Victorian Alice (played by Hailey Weber) while interacting with all the classic characters.

Other cast members included Angelina Schembry as Jacky Rabbit, Shelly Murdock as the Cheshire Cat, Richard O’Donnell as the Mad Hatter, Christopher Rodriguez as the Dormouse, Christopher Dwyer as Tweedledee, Ryan Woodard as Tweedledum, Angela Conzone Dwyer as the Queen of Hearts, and Grace Brunet as the Knave of Hearts. The Bells & Wheezle Circus clowns include Richard O’Donnell as Belvedere Brumbleton, Christopher Dwyer as Mr. Zizzlebot, Angela Conzone Dwyer as Mrs. Zizzlebot, Myah Myers as Boo Hoo, Brandon Bogart as Itsy Bitsy, Jillian LeBel as Marbles, Grant Brunet as Zigzag, Macy Murdock as Razzmatazz, Samantha Mooney as Razzle Dazzle, Madison Miller as Hob Nob, Jennifer Ann as Flip Flop, Meghan Gardner as Topsy Turvey, and Emma Murray as Teeny Weeny.

Songs included The Bells & Wheezle Circus, I'm a Zizzlebot, I'm Late, Tic Toc, Wish Myself, We're All Mad Here, Not For Me, Just Smile, All Hail the Queen/Off with His Head, and Many Reflections.

Principal creative staff included executive producer and director Richard O’Donnell, choreographer and musical director Angela Conzone Dwyer, arrangements and digital orchestrations by Ryan C. McNally, scenic and prop designer Stephen Chambers, costumer Karen Fischbeck, make-up artist Harlee Downey, technical director and production coordinator Christopher Dwyer, sound technicians Andrew Smith, and assistant director Samantha Mooney, assistant technical director Ryan Woodard, lighting operator Cody George, assistant costumer Ann Losurdo, costume assistant Hannah Gardner, assistant set dresser Pat Kelly, prop master Katelin Gardner, house manager Sheila LaMere, and general manager Bill LaMere.

Photo: Angela Conzone Dwyer as Mrs. Zizzlebot, Meghan Gardner as Topsy Turvey, R. O'Donnell as Belvedere Brumbleton, Christopher Dwyer as Mr. Zizzlebot sing Welcome to the Bells & Wheezle Circus in Alice Isn't All There

=== Twist ===
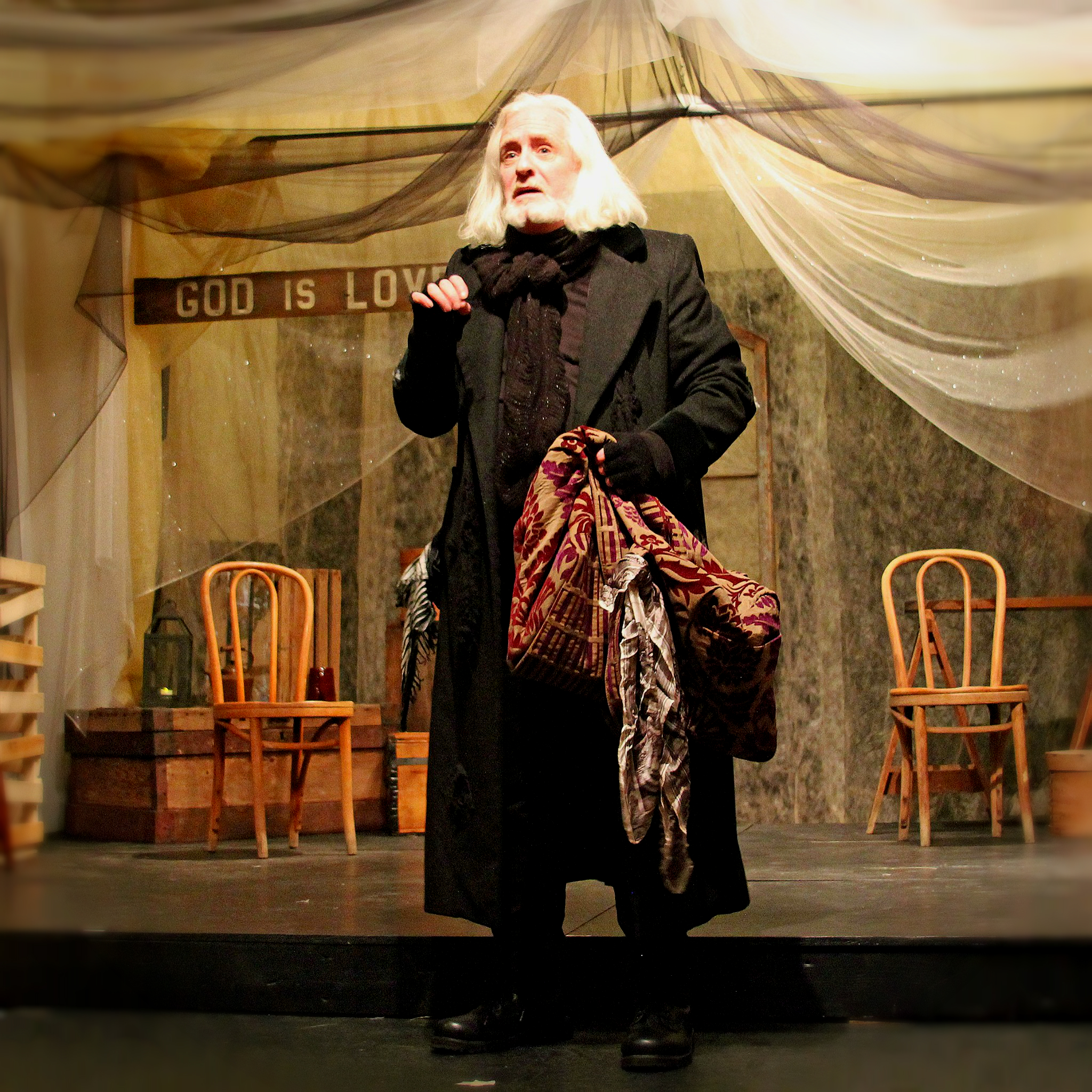
Twist - A Dickens of a Tale

Twist is a musical comedy adaptation of Charles Dickens’ classic Oliver Twist with book, music, and lyrics penned under Richard O’Donnell’s nom de plume B. R. Kreep. It was presented by the St. John's Conservatory Theater on October 14, 15, 16, 21, 22 and 23, 2016 at the St. John's Parish Theater in the city of Ogdensburg, NY. The production was executive produced and directed by O'Donnell, musical direction and choreography by Angela Conzone Dwyer, digital orchestrations by Ryan C. McNally, technical direction and production coordination by Christopher Dwyer, costumes and makeup design by Karen Fischbeck, senior costumer Heron Hetzler, assistant costumer Ann Losurdo, prop master Tonya Ott, and production design by Stephen Chambers.

The cast starred Chris Rodriguez as Oliver Twist, Hailey Weber as his deceased mother Agnes Brownlow, Cole Siebels as the Artful Dodger, Richard O’Donnell as Fagin, Angela Conzone Dwyer as Nancy Sikes, Christopher Dwyer as Bill Sikes, Shelly Murdock as Mrs. Sowerberry, Ryan Woodard as Mr. Sowerberry, Krista Kelly as Mrs. Brownlow, Angelina Schembry as Nelly, Grace Brunet as Napper, Gabby Ott as Minerva, Madison Miller as Newt, Conner Grenier as Octavius, Macy Murdock as Rip Torn, Megan Gardner as Hamstring and Jennifer Ann as Prudence.

Songs included: Twist Overture, Ode to Oliver, Work, More, Around About I Go, The Hearse Song, The Dead Tell No Tales, Set Free, Oh to Have a Child, Chuckaboo, Welcome to Your Destiny, London Bridge, Begin Again, Such is Love

Photo: Richard O'Donnell as Fagin sings Begin Again in Twist

== George Hall Auditorium – OFA Productions ==
=== Orchard of Hide & Seek ===
The musical "Orchard of Hide & Seek", book, music, and lyrics by Richard O'Donnell was restaged and presented at the multimillion-dollar all-digital George Hall Auditorium – OFA Theater in Ogdensburg, NY. It played two weeks beginning June 16 through the 23, 2017.

With additional songs and characters, Orchard of Hide & Seek was executive produced and directed by O'Donnell, musical direction and choreography by Angela Conzone Dwyer, production coordinator and technical direction by Christopher Dwyer, digital orchestrations by Ryan C. McNally, costume and makeup designer Karen Fischbeck with additional costumes by Heron Hetzler, and production design by Stephen Chambers.

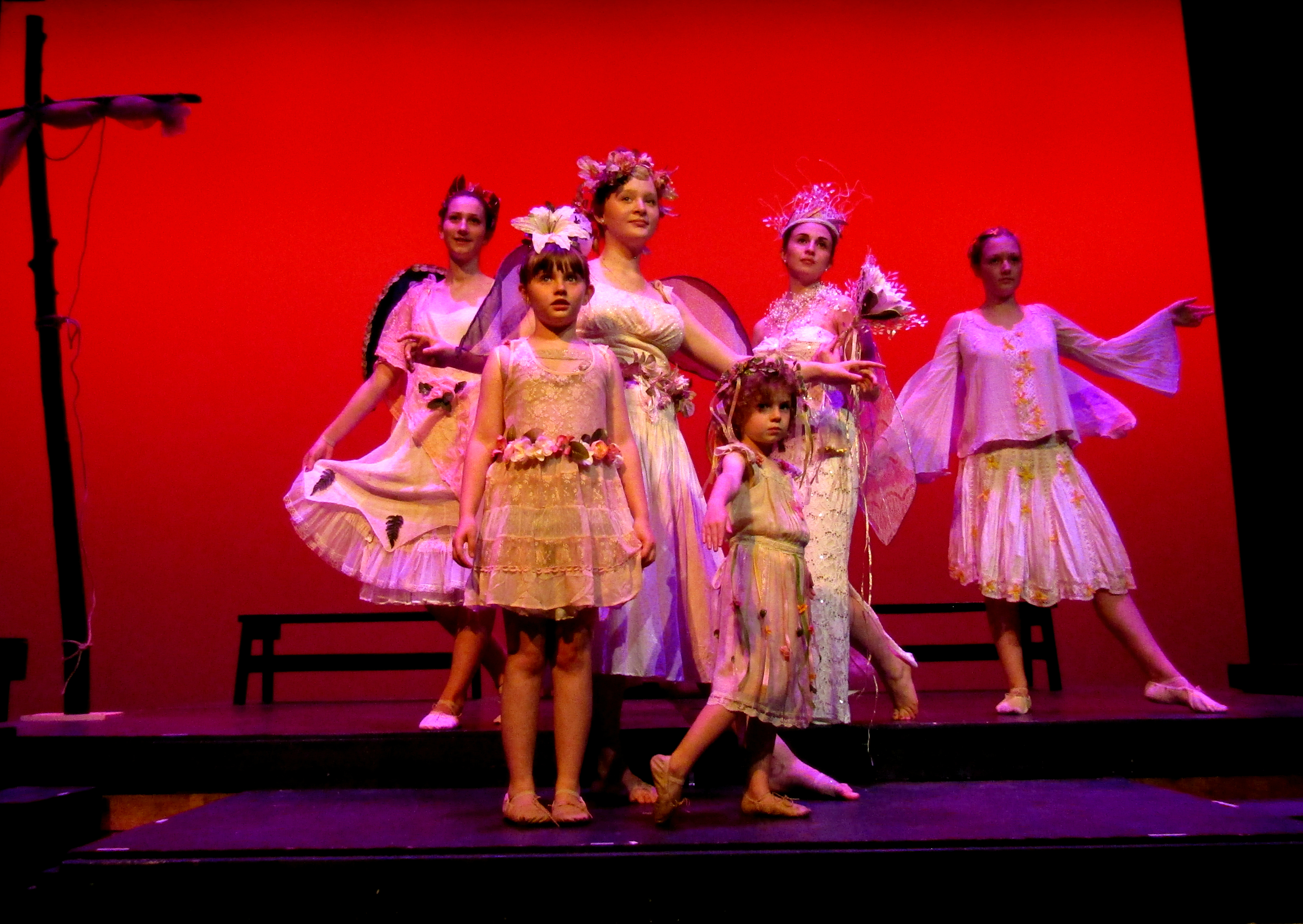
Orchard of Hide & Seek - George Hall Auditorium

The fairies were played by Tessa Harper as Onagh Queen of the Fairies, Hailey Weber as Princess Auria, Carina Cook as Princess Lilywink, Analyse Bullock as Shaylee, Grace Brunet as Lorilia and Ava Rutherford as Forsythia.

The Pixies were played by Myah Myers as Princess Nyssa, Macy Murdock as Nightshade, Meghan Gardner as Clover, Madison Miller as Silkfoot, Mia LaBella as Bitterbreeze and Emma Seeley as Jinglebug.

Children of Onwee were played by Caroline Silver as Lorcan Gallagher, Christopher Rodriguez as Rory Curren, Grant Brunet as Keelin Shanahan, Gabi Ott as Carmel McGlinchy, Philomena Bullock as Enya Fallon and Emma Murray as Deirdre McGuinness.

The pirates were played by Richard O’Donnell as Capt. Jean-Pierre Beunet, Brandon Bogart as Scallywag, Christopher Dwyer as Shivers, Gerard Powers as Whale-Eye and Eric Robinson as Basher.

The witches were played by Angela Conzone Dwyer as Ophelia Hollyhock Queen of Hubba Bubba, Shelly Murdock as Delia Hollyhock, Angelina Schembry as Vermilia Hollyhock and Krista Kelly as Misty the Singing Cauldron, along with Ryan Woodard as Yadder the Troll. Calea LeBel played Arema, Maddison LeBel played Gogo and Chloe Preston played Spiridon, the banshees of the dark castle.

Additional "Orchard" staff included lighting design by Barry Pratt, sound design by Richard Patton, and production stage manager Sadie Smith.

Songs included: White Coral Bells, The Orchard of Hide & Seek, Sailors of St. Labyrinth, The Witches of Hubba Bubba, Believe, Yo Ho Ho, The Regal C'est la Vie, Ophelia's Brew, Shipwrecked Sailor, Boo Witchy, Poison, Come All Ye Children, Doom, Ode to the Orchard, All Around You

Photo: Grace Brunet as Lorilia, Carina Cook as Princess Lilywink, Hailey Weber as Princess Auria, Analyse Bullock as Shaylee, Tessa Harper as Onagh Queen of the Fairies and Ava Rutherford as Forsythia in Orchard of Hide & Seek

=== Kreepy Hollow ===
“Kreepy Hollow”, (renamed) a musical comedy with book, music, and lyrics penned under Richard O’Donnell’s nom de plume B. R. Kreep, and based on Washington Irving’s classic short story “The Legend of Sleepy Hollow”, was presented at the new 900-seat multi-million dollar all-digital George Hall Auditorium - OFA Theater in Ogdensburg, NY. It played October 26–28, 2017 with matinees 27 and 28, and executive produced and directed by O’Donnell, vocal arrangements and digital orchestrations by Ryan C. McNally, musical direction and choreography by Angela Conzone Dwyer, production coordinator and technical direction by Christopher Dwyer, costume and makeup designer Karen Fischbeck, senior costumer Heron Hetzler, and production design by Stephen Chambers.

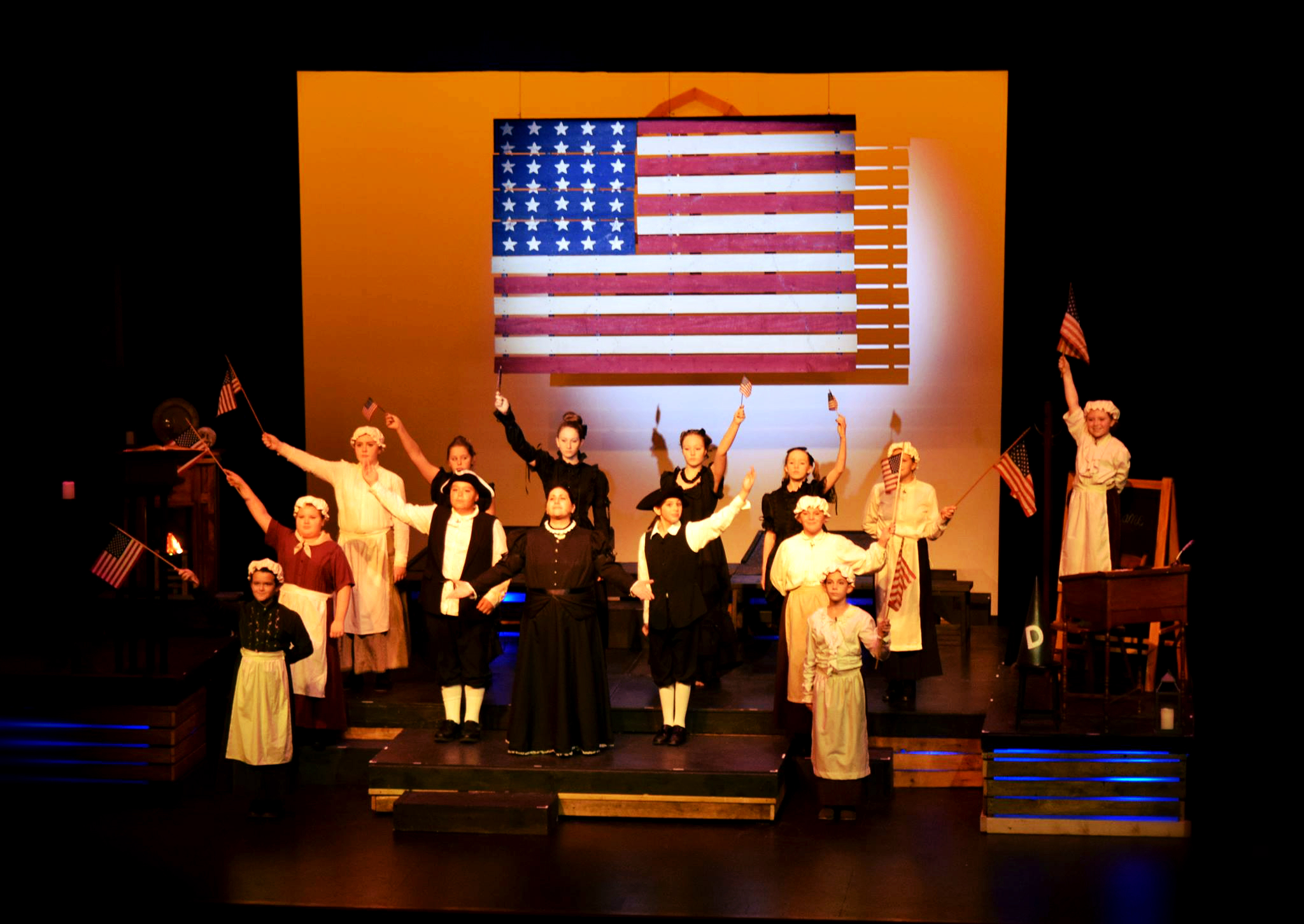
"Kreepy Hollow" - George Hall Auditorium

Kreepy Hollow starred Macy Murdock as Alia Hobb, Ava Rutherford as Ravinia Hobb, Caroline Silver as Etta Hobb, Grace Brunet as Tabitha Hobb, Richard O’Donnell as the narrator Diedrich Knickerbocker, Angela Conzone Dwyer as Ichaboda Krane, Christopher Dwyer as Bartholomeus Van tassel, Shelly Murdock as Electra Van Brunt, Tessa Harper as Eurella The Blue Witch, Eric Robinson as Thaddeus Frye, Christopher Rodriguez as Abner Frye, Maddison Cameron as Amias Moore, Gabriella Ott as Charity Smyth, Logan Carr as Chastity Smyth, Mia LaBelle as Comfort Cooke, Madison Miller as Constance Cooke, Delia Payne as Felicity Caldwell, Calea LeBel as Mercy Caldwell, Angela Schembry as Oheo Seneca, Hailey Weber as Parthenia Jones, Gerard Powers as Emory Jones, Samantha Holt as Prudence Miller, Stephen Chambers as Isham Miller, and Ryan Woodard as Nochal Head, the town crier.

Additional creative staff included sound design by Richard Patton, and lighting design by Barry Pratt.

Original songs included Overture, Ode to Kreepy Hollow, Halloween, Kreepy Hollow, Proper Peace of Mind, Ballad of the Headless Horseman, Rise, (We Are The Ones) Nobody Likes, I Wonder, I’m Lamenting, Ode to Wealth, and A Horseman. Additional period music included Shall We Gather at the River by Robert Lowry, Battle Hymn of the Republic, lyrics by Julia Ward Howe, music by William Steffe, and The Funeral March of a Marionette (Marche funèbre d'une marionnette) by Charles Gounod.

Photo: Angela Conzone Dwyer as Ichaboda Krane sings Battle Hymn of the Republic with her class in B. R. Kreep's Kreepy Hollow

=== Mr. Scrooge ===
Mr. Scrooge, a musical comedy adaptation on the Charles Dickens’ classic “A Christmas Carol" with book, music, and lyrics accredited to Richard O'Donnell's nom de plume B. R. Kreep, was a re-staging of the musical A Kreepy Christmas Carol. It was originally produced at the St. John’s Parish Hall Theater for the past three years, and was presented December 15, 2017 at the multi-million-dollar all-digital George Hall Auditorium - OFA Theater, Ogdensburg, NY. With the added lights, fly system, and sound capabilities, the production had a real “Broadway” feel. The upgraded theater experience included comfortable seating, and improved visibility. It played evenings December 15 and 16 with matinees December 16 and 17.

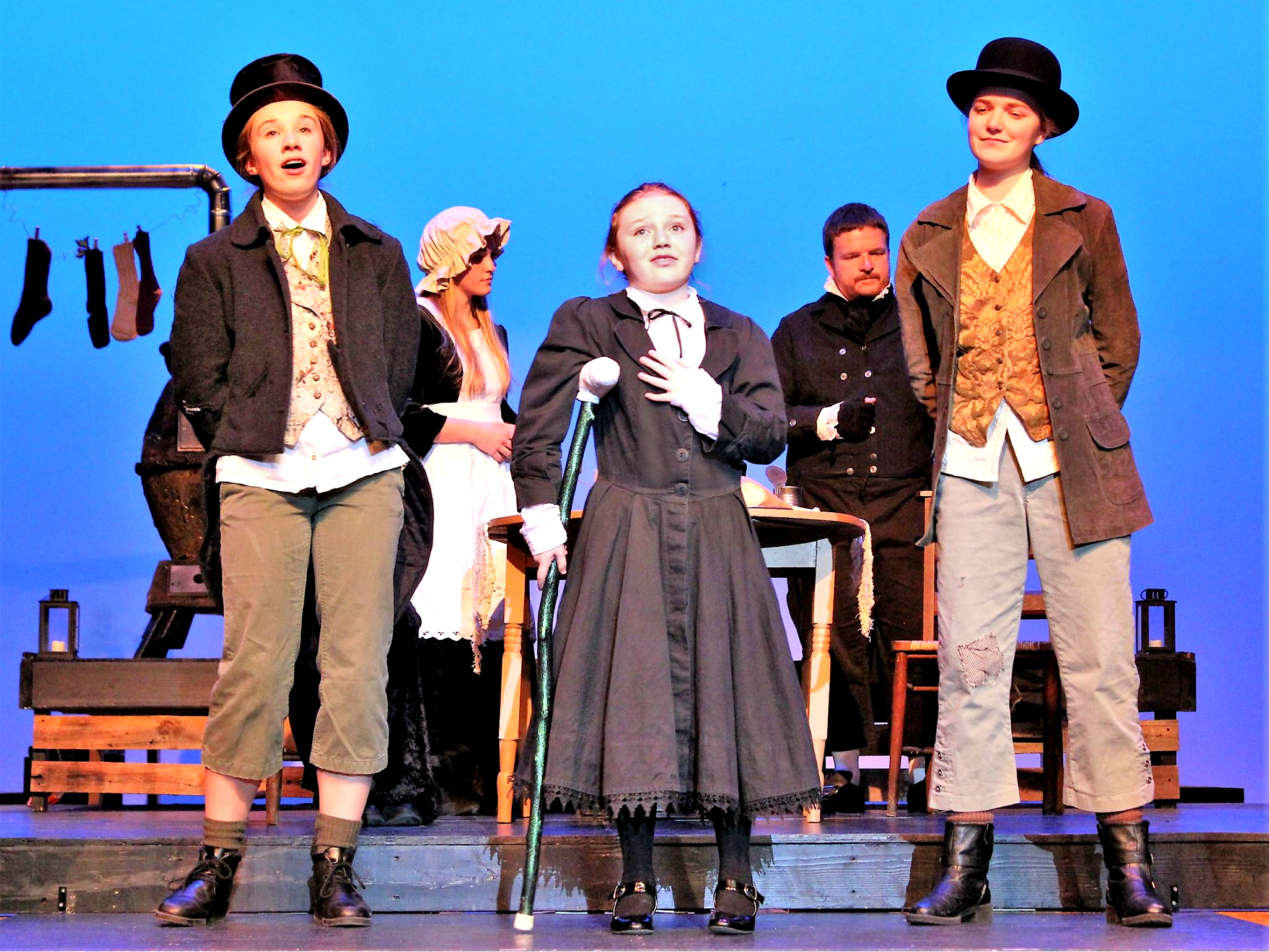
Mr Scrooge - George Hall Auditorium

Mr. Scrooge was presented with additional songs and characters, and was executive produced and directed by Richard O'Donnell, with musical direction and choreography by Angela Conzone Dwyer, technical direction by Christopher Dwyer, digital orchestrations and vocal arrangements by Ryan C. McNally, costumes and makeup design by Karen Fischbeck, senior costumer Heron Hetzler, assistant costumer Ann Losurdo, lighting design by Barry Pratt, sound design by Richard Patton, production design by Stephen Chambers, production stage manager Ashley Toppin, and props master Tonya Ott.

Additional score included Mr. Scrooge Overture, Counting Silver/I'm So Happy, Uncle Scrooge, To Be a Zombie, Ghost of Been There Done That, Heed Our Warning, I Hear The Bells A Ringing, Lovely Love, A Christmas Carol and Wish.

It starred Richard O’Donnell as Mr. Ebenezer Scrooge, Stephen Chambers as Jacob Marley's Ghost, Gerard Powers as Scrooge's nephew Fred, Angela Conzone Dwyer as Thelma Plum (The Ghost of Been There Done That), and Matilda Pift (The Ghost of Christmas Presents), Hailey Weber as Scrooge's young love interest Belle, Cole Siebels as Young Scrooge, Brandon Bogart as Fezziwig, and Lizzy Peo as Mrs. Fezziwig.

The street urchins starred Cadence Payne as Nipper, Jillian Lebel as Cager, Gabi Ott as Birdie, Myah Myers as Scraps, Grant Brunet as Rusty, Maddison Lebel as Hattie, and Meghan Gardner as Dustbin.

The Cratchit Family starred Christopher Dwyer as Bob, Lizzy Peo as Emily, Madison Miller as Bella, Ava Rutherford as Martha, and Maddison Cameron as Tiny Tina. Other roles include Mia Labella as Florence Sparkles, Calea Lebel as Matilda Sparkles, Delia Payne as Lizzy Sparkles, Rozalyn Dwyer as Dandelion Sparkles, and Ryan Woodard as Nocal Head the Mourner.

Photo: Cadence Payne as Nipper, Maddison Cameron as Tiny Tina, and Jillian Lebel as Cager sing Dancer in Mr. Scrooge
