= Family life education =

Professional organizations in the U.S

Family life education is defined by the National Council on Family Relations (NCFR) as "the educational effort to strengthen individual and family life through a family perspective. The objective of Family Life Education is to enrich and improve the quality of individual and family life." Parenting classes, pre-marriage education, marriage enrichment programs, and family financial planning courses are a few examples of this human development profession. These formal programs are a relatively recent phenomenon. However, family life education has existed informally throughout history—with marriage and child-rearing counsel passed from generation to generation as well by written information in ancient writings, mythology and religious scripture.

In a seminal work in the field, by Margaret Arcus, Jay Schvaneveldt and J. Joel Moss, the Handbook of Family Life Education offers several definitions by scholars as the field has evolved over time, dating back to 1962. Unlike family therapy, family life education works on a prevention model, teaching families to enrich family life and to prevent problems before they occur. Family therapy intervenes primarily after problems set-in. Research from the Rand Corporation (from Rand research report Early Childhood Interventions: Proven Results, Future Promise) and the Federal Reserve Bank of Minneapolis (in its report Early Childhood Development: Economic Development with a High Public Return) shows that family problems are less damaging for people—and less expensive for society—when they can be tackled by prevention. Family life education recognizes that all families can benefit from education and enrichment programs, not only those experiencing difficulties.

== History ==
A form of family life education entered public policy in the 1800s in the U.S. Hatch Act of 1887, forming the underpinnings for the national network of Land Grant universities, agricultural experiment stations, and the Cooperative Extension Service out of the US Department of Agriculture. The Hatch Act specifies, in part, that the federal resources for research and education should focus on "agriculture in its broadest aspects" to include the "development and improvement of the rural home". This early form of family life education centered around the field of home economics and training of practical home-based skills in areas such as food preparation and sewing. Family life education moved into widespread public awareness in the early 20th century by offering gardening, home canning and nutrition information to homemakers in programs such as the "Victory Gardens".

In 1912, President William Howard Taft established the Children's Bureau, the oldest federal agency for child welfare within the Administration for Children and Families. The Children's Bureau was created to investigate and report on infant mortality, birth rates, orphanages, juvenile courts, and other social issues of that time. The Children's Bureau also introduced parent education materials by producing infant and child care booklets for families in the early 20th century. As the field evolved, home economics expanded to include psychosocial education to support healthy adult and child development, parenting, relationship enrichment and communication skills. In recognition of the increasing breadth of the field, many college and university degree programs renamed their home economics major to titles such as Human Ecology, Family Studies, Family Life Education, and Family Science.

In the late 1980s, Dr. Michael A. O'Donnell, a former Assistant Professor of Family Studies and Dean of Professional Studies with Faulkner University and Certified Family Life Educator, and University of Alabama professor Dr. Nick Stinnett co-founded The International Family Life Institute, Inc., Montgomery, Alabama, a for-profit enterprise offering assistance in curriculum development, prevention-through-education seminars, and research and writing projects in the area of family and consumer science and practice. The International Family Life Institute helped pioneer the first B.S. degree completion program in Family Life Education on the campus of Spring Arbor University, Mich.

In 1996 the National Council on Family Relations began reviewing and approving family degree programs for inclusion of coursework that could lead to provisional certification as a Certified Family Life Educator (CFLE). There are more than 130 CFLE-approved academic programs through NCFR.

== Credentialing of family life educators ==
Family life educators work in many settings—academia, health care facilities, community programs, human services agencies, corporate employee work-life programs, faith-based organizations and public policy arenas. In 1985, the National Council on Family Relations (NCFR) established the first national credential for the profession—the Certified Family Life Educator (CFLE). As of 2011, there were approximately 1550 CFLEs in the U.S. and Canada. The National Council on Family Relations is the nation's oldest non-profit professional association focused solely on family research, practice and education, and the professional home for the nation's leading family researchers and educators. Founded in 1938, NCFR is non-partisan and is the nation's premier source of family research and Family Life Education practice information.

They publish three scholarly research journals, the Journal of Marriage and Family, Family Relations: Interdisciplinary Journal of Applied Family Studies, and Journal of Family Theory and Review. NCFR holds an annual conference that draws approximately 1100 family professionals together to share the latest family research and information on best practices.

There are several different types of credentialing practices. Approval can be issued to individuals or academic programs, via either governmental public policy or by non-governmental organizations. In brief,

- Certification is a voluntary process by which a professional agency or association grants recognition to an individual who has met certain predetermined qualifications or standards.
- Licensure is a mandatory process by which a government or licensing bureau permits individuals to practice in designated professions. It gives qualified people the right to engage in a particular occupation or profession in that state, to use a specific title, or to perform a specific function.
- Accreditation is a process by which a professional agency or association recognizes that a program meets certain requirements. It ensures quality control of colleges and university programs—not individual practitioners.

The nonprofit PAIRS Foundation began training and licensing family life educators in 1984 to deliver classes throughout the world on behalf of the organization's mission "to teach those attitudes, emotional understandings, and behaviors that nurture and sustain healthy relationships and to make this knowledge broadly available on behalf of a safer, saner, more loving world". The PAIRS approach to Family Life Education is detailed in "Building Intimate Relationships" and in founder Lori Heyman Gordon's book Passage to Intimacy, as well as in numerous published studies. As of 2012, PAIRS Foundation had trained and licensed more than 2,500 behavioral health professionals, clergy and lay leaders.

PREP, Inc. also trains family life educators based on a model developed through "30 years of research in the field of relationship health, with much of the research conducted at the University of Denver, sponsored by the National Institute of Mental Health". PREP, Inc. has trained over 15,875 mental health, nursing, education, and other professionals including clergy and lay leaders from 28 countries to become facilitators.

=== Certification options through NCFR ===
Those holding the Certified Family Life Educator (CFLE) designation are voluntarily certified as opposed to holding licensure. Individuals can pursue the national CFLE credential through one of two ways:

- By completing a standardized, 150 multiple-choice question exam
- By completing a degree program in one of over 125 college and university programs in the family sciences that have affiliated with NCFR as approved family science curricula. A college or university family studies program must be "accredited" by one of the U.S. regional accrediting agencies before applying for NCFR's approval. Graduates of NCFR-approved programs complete an Abbreviated Application process to receive Provisional Certification.

=== Certification options through PREP, Inc. ===
In order to teach PREP courses, individuals must complete 18 hours of training.

=== Certification options through PAIRS Foundation ===
PAIRS Foundation requires rigorous training, annual licensure, and adherence to ethical standards for all of its instructors. Training takes place through five distinct levels, each of which lasts from 24–32 hours.

=== Certified Canadian Family Educator Program ===
Canadian family life educators can be certified through the Certified Canadian Family Educator Program operated by the Canadian Association of Family Resource Programs.
