= Richard O'Donnell =

Richard O'Donnell may refer to:

- Richard O'Donnell (American football) (1900–1947), American football player
- Richard O'Donnell (playwright) (born 1956), American playwright
- Richard O'Donnell (footballer) (born 1988), English footballer

== See also ==
- Rick O'Donnell, candidate in the 2006 United States House of Representatives elections in Colorado
