= The Kreep =

American dramatist

B. R. Kreep
- The Kreep character
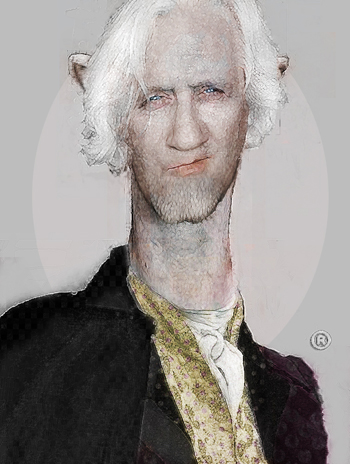
- B. R. Kreep - The Kreep
- First appearance: Static Multimedia webzine, October 31, 2007
- Created by: Richard O'Donnell
- Voiced by: Richard O'Donnell

In-universe information
- Gender: Male
- Occupation: Poet, playwright, composer & lyricist
- Nationality: American
- Website: The Kreep

The Kreep, also recognized by the pseudonym B. R. Kreep, is a Gothic poet, playwright, composer, and lyricist. The creative endeavors attributed to The Kreep are the work of the writer Richard O’Donnell, who adopts this pen name for artistic expression.

== Premise and background ==
=== Static Multimedia webzine ===
Richard O'Donnell first used the pen name The Kreep beginning on Halloween, 2007. It was attached to a weekly column published by webzine Static Multimedia. The column, under the banner of Kreep's Korner, reviewed classic and contemporary horror films in rhyme which were also linked to a weekly podcast on iTunes, voiced by creator O'Donnell and engineered by Eric Hoffhines.

== Poetry Readings ==
=== Poetry Scream ===
O'Donnell went on to produce and host (Dressed in steampunk garb as The Kreep) the Poetry Scream on July 30, 2010, at the Boiler Room, Port Townsend, Washington. An ongoing weekly event, the Poetry Scream featured five poets on stage. While hosting, O'Donnell would read The Kreep's poems. The Poetry Scream ended its run in 2013.

== Cabarets and musical comedies ==
=== An Evening With The Kreep ===
An Evening With The Kreep is a 60-minute theatrical with book, music, and lyrics accredited to O'Donnell's pen name The Kreep and was directed by Amanda Steurer. It was presented by the Black Pearl Cabaret on October 25–27, 2012 at the Undertown, Port Townsend, Washington. The musical comedy featured original poetry, song and dance.

Songs included "Welcome To My Lighthouse", "See Me", "Wish Myself", "I'm Lamenting", and "Halloween".

=== Kreepmas ===
Kreepmas is an adaptation of the Charles Dickens’ classic A Christmas Carol with book, music, and lyrics accredited to O'Donnell's pen name The Kreep. It was presented by the Black Pearl Cabaret on December 20–23, 2012 at the Undertown in Port Townsend, WA.

Songs included "Kreepmas Celebration", "Drink Up For Kreepmas", "I'm the Ghost of Been There Done That", "The Bells", "Why Not For Me", and "We Wish You a Merry Kreepmas".

=== Kreepshow ===
Kreepshow is a 90-minute Gothic musical comedy cabaret with book, music, and lyrics accredited to O'Donnell's pen name The Kreep. It opened for an open-ended run on March 29, 2013, at the historic Manresa Castle in Port Townsend, WA.

Songs included "Welcome to My Castle", "See Me", "How I Miss the Circus", "I'm Lamenting", and "Kreepy Things".

=== Reviews ===
Steve Treacy, contributing theatre critic to the Port Townsend Leader wrote of the troupe's skills that, “Overall the group’s singing and dancing numbers, including “I’m Lamenting” and “Creepy Things,” round out one's “good to be alive” evening.” He went on to praise The Kreep, saying, “His writing, directing, acting and warbling abilities conspire to make him a quadruple threat. Even his spoken poems, especially “Little Annie Orkle,” are sparkling (no mean feat for that musty old art form).”

In a “Best Local Theater of 2013” article published in the PT Leader Arts Section, "Kreepshow," a Gothic comedy cabaret conjuring some spiritual denizens of our Victorian seaport,” was listed as one of the favorite locally written plays accredited to O'Donnell's pen name The Kreep.

=== St. John's Conservatory Theater, Ogdensburg, N.Y. ===
O'Donnell wrote under his pen name The Kreep for the St. John's Conservatory Theater. Their production and costume design were "reminiscent of Tim Burton’s Gothic ingenuity."

=== Alice Isn't All There ===
Alice Isn't All There is a musical comedy adaptation on the Lewis Carroll’s classic Alice's Adventures in Wonderland with book, music, and lyrics accredited to O'Donnell's pen name The Kreep. It was presented by the St. John's Conservatory Theater on October 10, 11, 17, 18, 24, 25, 2014 at the St. John's Parish Theater in the city of Ogdensburg, NY.

Original songs included "The Bells & Wheezle Circus", "Tic Toc", "Wish Myself", "We're All Mad Here", "Not For Me", "The Oswegatchie", "All Hail the Queen/Off with His Head", and "Reflections".

=== Alice Isn't All There Re-staged ===
Alice Isn't All There was re-staged and presented by St. John's Conservatory Theater on June 3, 4, 5, 17, 18, and 19, 2016 with an extended book, music, and lyrics accredited to O'Donnell's pen name The Kreep.

Songs included "The Bells & Wheezle Circus", "I'm a Zizzlebot", "I'm Late", "Tic Toc", "Wish Myself", "We're All Mad Here", "Why Not For Me", "All Hail the Queen/Off with His Head", and "Many Reflections".

=== A Kreepy Christmas Carol ===
A Kreepy Christmas Carol is a 90-minute musical comedy adaptation on the Charles Dickens’ classic A Christmas Carol with book, music, and lyrics accredited to O'Donnell's pen name The Kreep. It was presented by the St. John's Conservatory Theater on December 6, 12, 13, 19 and 20, 2014 at the St. John's Parish Theater in the city of Ogdensburg, NY.

Original songs included "Kreepy Overture", "Counting Silver", "I'm So Happy", "To Be A Zombie", "Ghost of Been There Done That", "Heed Our Warning", "Ballad of Ebenezer Scrooge", "I Hear The Bells A Ringing", and "Wish".

=== Mr. Scrooge ===
Mr. Scrooge, a musical comedy adaptation on the Charles Dickens’ classic “A Christmas Carol" with book, music, and lyrics accredited to O'Donnell's pen name The Kreep, and was a re-staging of the musical A Kreepy Christmas Carol. It was presented on December 15 and 16 with matinees December 16 and 17, 2018 at the George Hall Theater at Ogdensburg Free Academy, Ogdensburg, NY.

Mr. Scrooge was presented with additional songs and characters.

Songs included "Mr. Scrooge Overture", "Counting Silver/I'm So Happy", "Uncle Scrooge", "To Be a Zombie", "Ghost of Been There Done That", "Heed Our Warning", "I Hear The Bells A Ringing", "Lovely Love", "A Christmas Carol" and "Wish".

=== Kreepy Hallow ===
Kreepy Hallow is a musical comedy adaptation of Washington Irving’s classic short story “The Legend of Sleepy Hollow" with book, music, and lyrics accredited to O'Donnell's pen name The Kreep. It was presented by the St. John's Conservatory Theatre on October 16, 17, 18, 23, 24 and 25 2016 at the St. John's Parish House in the city of Ogdensburg, NY.

Original songs included "Halloween", "Welcome to my Lighthouse", "See Me", "Kreepy Hallow", "Proper Peace of Mind", "Ballad of the Headless Horseman", "I'm Lamenting", "Ode to Wealth", and "A Horseman".

Additional period music included "Shall We Gather at the River" by Robert Lowry, "Battle Hymn of the Republic", lyrics by Julia Ward Howe, music by William Steffe, and "The Funeral March of a Marionette" (Marche funèbre d'une marionnette) by Charles Gounod.

=== Kreepy Hollow ===
Kreepy Hollow was the re-staged version of "Kreepy Hallow" (with new spelling) and accredited to O'Donnell's pen name The Kreep. It was presented at the new 900-seat multimillion-dollar all-digital OFA Auditorium Theater in Ogdensburg, NY. It played October 26–28, 2017.

=== Twist ===
Twist is a musical comedy adaptation of Charles Dickens’ classic Oliver Twist with book, music, and lyrics accredited to O'Donnell's pen name The Kreep. It was presented by the St. John's Conservatory Theater on October 14, 15, 16, 21, 22 and 23, 2016 in the city of Ogdensburg, NY.

== Honors ==
=== Coraline Handmade Box ===
In 2008, O'Donnell's The Kreep character received a Coraline handmade box numbered 46/50 assembled by the stop-motion animation team at Laika films, honoring their favorite bloggers. Inside the box, numbered 46/50, are decorated secret compartments that contain relics from the film including a bat/dog model, a bat body mold, authentic skeleton key with secret password, and a wing skeleton prototype #3. An old envelope with a wax seal with inlaid black button (as used for the eyes of the witch) and a hand-typed note explained the curious gift: "We admire your dedication to The Kreep. Please keep up the super work. We'll be reading."
