= David Bredehoft =

American psychologist

David J. Bredehoft
- Education: University of Oklahoma; University of Minnesota College of Education and Human Development
- Scientific career
- Workplaces: Concordia University

David J. Bredehoft, Ph.D., CFLE, is the former chair of the Department of Social and Behavioral Sciences at Concordia University, Saint Paul, in Minnesota as well as a former Professor of Psychology and Family Studies. Along with Jean Illsley Clarke and Connie Dawson, he is a co-author of the 2003 parenting book How Much is Enough? Everything You Need to Know to Steer Clear of Overindulgence and Raise Likeable, Responsible, and Respectful Children.

== Background and education ==
Dr. Bredehoft earned a B.A. in Psychology and a Master of Education in Educational Psychology from the University of Oklahoma, and a Ph.D. in Family Social Science from the University of Minnesota. Dr. Bredehoft holds four academic degrees in the fields of psychology, family social science, and educational psychology. He has over thirty-five years of experience in research, marriage and family therapy, and teaching. He is a licensed psychologist in the State of Minnesota. The National Council on Family Relations in 2003, named him the Certified Family Life Educator of the Year.

== Work ==
Dr. Bredehoft has had over 100 articles published in journals, magazines, and newspapers relating to interests in psychology, parenting, and family studies. He has presented papers at national conventions at various places throughout the country. His primary research focus has been the relationship between childhood overindulgence and potential adult problems and parenting practices; he has completed seven studies on the topic with a total of 2,368 participants between them. The topic forms the basis of his 2003 book How Much is Enough?.

In 2009, he and Michael Walcheski co-authored a book titled Family Life Education: Integrating Theory and Practice, which was published by the National Council on Family Relations.
