= Family Relations (journal) =

- Discipline: Family science, social work
- Language: English
- Edited by: Wendy Middlemiss

Publication details
- History: 1952-present
- Publisher: Wiley-Blackwell on behalf of the National Council on Family Relations
- Frequency: 5/year
- Impact factor: 1.317 (2019)

Standard abbreviations
- ISO 4: Fam. Relat.

Indexing
- CODEN: FCOOBE
- ISSN: 0197-6664 (print); 1741-3729 (web)
- LCCN: 80642226
- JSTOR: 01976664
- OCLC no.: 5885388

Links
- Journal homepage; Online access; Online archive; Journal page at National Council on Family Relations website

Family Relations is a peer-reviewed academic journal published by Wiley-Blackwell on behalf of the National Council on Family Relations. It covers applied research on family studies and social work. The journal was established in 1952 as The Coordinator, renamed The Family Life Coordinator in 1960, and renamed again in 1970 to The Family Coordinator before obtaining its current title in 1980.

== Editors ==
The following persons are or have been editors-in-chief of the journal:

- 2019-present: Wendy Middlemiss
- 2016-2018: Jason D. Hans
- 2010-2015: Ronald M. Sabbatelli
- 2005-2009: Joyce Arditti
- 2001-2004: Kay Pasley
- 1997-2000: Jeffrey W. Dwyer
- 1993-1996: Mark A. Fine
- 1987-1992: Timothy H. Brubaker
- 1982-1986: Michael Sporakowski
- 1976-1981: James Walters
- 1970-1975: William C. Nichols, Jr.
- 1968-1969: William M. Smith, Jr.

== Abstracting and indexing ==
The journal is abstracted and indexed in:

- EBSCO databases
- Current Contents/Social & Behavioral Sciences
- InfoTrac
- ProQuest databases
- Social Sciences Citation Index
- VINITI Database RAS

According to the Journal Citation Reports, the journal has a 2016 impact factor of 1.426.
