= R. Rated =

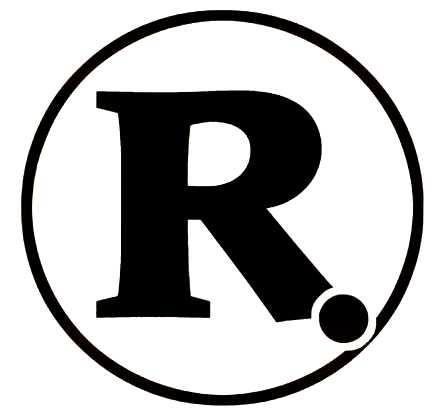
- Genre: Variety/sketch
- Created by: R. O'Donnell
- Directed by: Peter Neville
- Creative directors: Steve Wood; Peter Neville
- Starring: R. O'Donnell; Ectomorph; Videos from the ID; Mick Napier and the Annoyance Theater; Peter Neville
- No. of seasons: 1
- No. of episodes: 5

Production
- Executive producer: R. O'Donnell
- Producer: Vicki Potts
- Production location: Chicago
- Cinematography: Codey
- Editor: Edward Seaton
- Running time: 24 min
- Production companies: R. Productions; VPA Production

Original release
- Network: WFLD
- Release: August 13, 1999

R. Rated was a late 90s American comedy variety TV show executive produced and hosted by comic R. O'Donnell. It aired on Fridays at midnight on WFLD Fox 32, Chicago, and featured sketch comedy troupes, theater companies, musicians, stand-up comics and other independent film and video makers.

== History ==
In 1996 through 1998, stand-up comic R. O'Donnell hosted the Fox Diner (WFLD–Channel 32) at Taste of Chicago, which was an entertainment venue promoting the Fox network with live talent interviews, giveaways and bands. In 1998, O'Donnell pitched his comedy/variety show concept to vice president and general manager Stacey Marks-Bronner. She greenlit a midnight time-slot on the station.

== Production ==
R. Rated was created, executive produced and hosted by O'Donnell, who, as a comic, was billed simply as "R." (hence the title of the show). Vicki Potts served as producer and Edward Seaton served as director and editor.

It premiered Friday, August 13, 1999, at midnight on WFLD Fox 32, Chicago. It was listed in the TV Guide as a 30-minute variety show that was rated PG.

The commercials for local sponsors were directed and produced by O'Donnell as a nod to The Ernie Kovacs Show and, "...as a way of integrating the plugs into the free-flowing nature of the show."

Bumpers and fillers were created by Steve Wood and Peter Neville.

== Featured talent ==
Numerous short form video works from the sketch comedy groups Videos from the ID, Ectomorph (Darren Bodeker, Bart Heird and Jim Kopsian), and the Annoyance Theater were featured. The Annoyance Theater Productions starred actors Rachel Dratch (Saturday Night Live), Mick Napier (The Second City), and Stephnie Weir (MADtv). Former Second City and Saturday Night Live alumni Tim Kazurinsky offered a Willy Laszlo directed short about the most unusual home invader while O'Donnell appeared in an array of impromptu "man on the street interviews" and monologues.

Musical acts included The Swinging Love Hammers, Kleen Ex-Girl Wonder, and The Gathering Field.

O'Donnell requested Fox keep the show out of prime time so that his contributors like Mick Napier of the Annoyance Theatre, could have greater late-night artistic freedom without black-bar and sound bleep censorship.

== Ratings and reviews ==
R. Rated received ratings that outpaced competing shows in the same time slot including the Late Late Show with Craig Kilborn on Chicago's Channel 2 and Mancow TV on Channel 26. R. Rated drew an average 2.9 rating out of 7 shares in its time slot, tying with Ch. 7 and Ch. 50 programming. Executives at Fox 32 awarded R. Rated with another 26 weeks of broadcasting.

Regarded as very Chicago-centric, R. Rated was, according to Ben Winters of NewCity, Chicago "...exactly what creator R. O'Donnell set out for: a fun, inventive half-hour showcasing Chicago talent." Winters went on to praise Mick Napier's videos as, "...perverse, bizarre, and brilliant," and that sketch comedy troupe Ectomorph were, "...on target with their charming, Chaplinesque black and white videos."

O'Donnell also hoped his new TV comedy series would earn greater recognition for a wide array of Chicago talent.

== Bootleg DVD ==
R. Rated (only available through bootlegs on DVD) remains a rare collection of Chicago's variety and comedic talent on the rise in the late 1990s.
