= Michael A. O'Donnell =

American writer and researcher

- Born: June 17, 1956; Bryn Mawr, Pennsylvania, U.S.
- Died: February 15, 2025 (aged 68)
- Occupations: Author, Researcher, Lecturer
- Children: 3
- Relatives: Richard O'Donnell (twin brother)

Michael A. O'Donnell (born June 17, 1956, in Bryn Mawr, Pennsylvania - died February 15, 2025) was an American writer and researcher and co-principal investigator of the Adolescent Wellness Research Project, jointly with family strengths scholar Nick Stinnett. Their research on adolescent wellness was published in the book Good Kids (Doubleday 1995) and they were invited to speak on this study before the United Nations in Vienna, Austria, in 1995.

== Biography ==
O'Donnell received his Ph.D. from Kansas State University in 1986.

=== The International Family Life Institute ===
In the late 1980s, O'Donnell, then an assistant professor of Family Studies, Dean of Professional Studies at Faulkner University and a Certified Family Life Educator (CFLE), and Stinnett co-founded The International Family Life Institute, Inc., Montgomery, AL. The Institute helped pioneer the first B.S. degree completion program in Family Life Education on the campus of Spring Arbor University, Mich., leading to certification for professionals as Certified Family Life Educators (CFLE) through the National Council on Family Relations (NCFR). The institute was a for-profit enterprise offering assistance in curriculum development, prevention-through-education seminars, and research and writing projects in the area of family and consumer science and practice.

=== Southwest Center for Fathering ===
In the early 1990s, O'Donnell was also an associate professor of family studies and the founding executive director of the Southwest Center for Fathering on the campus of Abilene Christian University. The center was the first university-based center for fathering in the United States. O'Donnell was interviewed for his work in the area of fathering in The Chronicle of Higher Education. O'Donnell trained over 400 certified fathering small group leaders in the U.S. and overseas. Also, the Center for Fathers and Families in Sacramento, Calif., was formed after attendees returned from a seminar held by O'Donnell at Abilene Christian University.

=== Author ===
In 1995, O'Donnell, a professor of Family Studies and Department Chair of Psychology & Behavioral Sciences with Rochester Christian University had authored or co-authored seven books, including: Home from Oz (Thomas Nelson & Word 1994), A Question of Honor (HarperCollins & Zondervan 1995), and How A Man Prepares His Sons for Life (Baker Publishing Group & Bethany House 1995). These books have been the focus of numerous radio, TV and print features such as in USA Today, Better Homes and Gardens and Jet magazines; 60 Minutes, CBS Interactive Business Network, CNN and the PBS nationally syndicated radio program To the Best of Our Knowledge.

=== Personal life ===
He is the identical twin brother of award-winning playwright Richard O'Donnell. He is married and has three children (one deceased) and three grandchildren.

=== Death ===
He died on February 15, 2025, at age 68.

== Academic and popular books ==
- The Oz Syndrome: Coming Home to Find Contentment in the Sacredness of the Family, Faith Happenings Publishers, Denver, Colorado, 2020.
- What A Son Needs from His Dad, Baker Publishing Group, Minneapolis, Minn., 2018.
- 什么是儿子从他的父亲需要", Anhui Publishing House, China, 2015.
- وهات أ أ سن ندس فروم حيث, Dar El Thaqafa Communications House, Arabia, 2014.
- What A Son Needs from His Dad, Baker Publishing Group, Minneapolis, Minn., 2011.
- 你和你的孩子们可以成功驾驭十几岁的年龄 (w/ N. Stinnett), Centre for Fathering, Ltd, Singapore, 2001.
- The Oz Syndrome, Hillcrest Publishers, Abilene, Texas, 2001.
- 어떻게 사람이 인생에 대한 그의 아들을 준비, Compass House Publishers, Seoul, Korea, 1997.
- A Question of Honor (w/ J. Gantar and T. Patten), HarperCollins/Zondervan, New York, NY, 1996.
- Good Kids: How You and Your Kids Can Successfully Navigate the Teen Years (w/ N. Stinnett), Doubleday, New York, NY, 1996.
- How A Man Prepares His Sons for Life, Bethany House, Minneapolis, MN, 1996.
- Heart of the Warrior: A Battle Plan for Christian Men, College Press Publishers, Joplin, Mo., 1996.
- O’Donnell M.A., et al. Initiatives for Families: Research, Policy, Practice, and Education. Minneapolis, MN: National Council on Family Relations, 1995.
- Home From Oz: Finding Contentment In Your Family, Thomas Nelson/Word, Dallas, Texas, 1994; Novo Ink, E-Book, 2011.
- Heart of the Warrior: A Battle Plan for Fathers to Reclaim Their Families (with Michelle Morris), Abilene Christian University Press, Abilene, Texas, 1993.
- Human Life Cycle I: Instructor's Manual, Spring Arbor University, Spring Arbor, MI, 1991.
- Human Life Cycle II: Instructor's Manual, Spring Arbor University, Spring Arbor, MI, 1991.
- The Professional Family Life Educator: Instructor's Manual, Spring Arbor University, Spring Arbor, MI, 1991.
- Grief Management I: Instructor's Manual, Spring Arbor University, Spring Arbor, MI, 1990.
- Grief Management II: Instructor's Manual, Spring Arbor University, Spring Arbor, MI, 1990.
- Parenting and Family Skills: Instructor's Manual, Spring Arbor University, Spring Arbor, MI, 1989.
- Family Theory: Instructor's Manual, Editor, Spring Arbor University, Spring Arbor, MI, 1989.

== Awards and honors ==
Some honors and awards include: In 1992, then-Governor President Bill Clinton appointed Michael O'Donnell as an "Arkansas Traveler"; he also has had induction into Kappa Omicron Nu Family and Consumer Sciences Honor Society (1991); inducted into Psi Chi Psychology Honor Society (1997); selected as the Coons-Farrar Lecturer for Harding University (1992); selected as the President B. Garrison Lecturer for Henderson State University (1993); a Fine Arts Lecturer on Fathering and the Media for Lander University (1994); selected as the Dr. Bruce Everist Endowed Lecturer for Louisiana Tech University. He was invited in 2002 by then-Prime Minister Goh Chok Tong to be the keynote speaker of Singapore’s National Week of the Family.

In 2012, he was selected as a Catholic Press Association Award-Winner for his monthly column, Family Matters in The Colorado Catholic Herald.
