= One and One (musical) =

1978 musical comedy

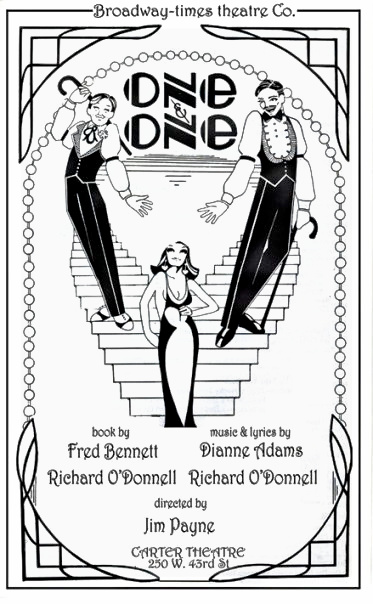
- Off-Broadway Poster
- Music: Dianne Adams and Richard O'Donnell
- Lyrics: Dianne Adams and Richard O'Donnell
- Book: Fred Bennett and Richard O'Donnell
- Productions: 1978 Off-Broadway
- Awards: 3 ASCAP Awards

One & One is an American 1970s ASCAP award-winning original off-Broadway musical comedy by Dianne Adams (music and lyrics), Fred Bennett (book), and Richard O'Donnell (book, music and lyrics).

== Production ==
One & One is a musical comedy that was produced by the Broadway-Times Theatre, Co.. Musical numbers were staged by Roger Braun, musical direction was by Dianne Adams, and the production was directed by Jim Payne. It opened November 15, 1978 at The Carter Theatre, 250 West 43rd Street in the heart of Times Square.

One & One previewed in New York City at the Carter Theatre (formally the Bert Wheeler Theatre) for over six months before officially opening on November 15, 1978. On opening night, Dianne Adams was 19, Richard O’Donnell was 22, and Fred Bennett was 24 years old.

One & One officially launched the Broadway-Times Theatre Company, dedicated to producing original musicals.

== Synopsis ==
One & One tells the story of a fading song and dance team Majeski & O’Reily that are forced to take on a woman partner to boost their notoriety. An old childhood friend, Julie Allyn, has blossomed into a talented beauty; they both fall in love with her with disastrous results. Through the decline of Vaudeville to the rise of the big Hollywood musicals, One & One is an homage to American entertainment with “...as good a score as any on Broadway today.”

== History ==
In 1976, while attending Mansfield University, Dianne Adams (music and lyrics), Fred Bennett (book), and Richard O’Donnell (book, music, and lyrics) met, all sharing their adoration for the bygone years of Vaudeville, Burlesque, and the great MGM musicals.

In 1978, their musical comedy One & One was officially produced off-Broadway and went on to receive three ASCAP Special Awards in 1978 and one in 1979, under the category of musical theater.

== Broadway production ==
One & One was slated for Broadway, produced by Duff Boardman & Associates, Theatre Now, Inc., general managers; and budgeted at one million dollars. For the Broadway backers audition, unknown actor Nathan Lane recorded the role of Jeff O’Riely. Tap legend Miriam Nelson was signed to direct and choreograph. Due to costs, the show never hit the Great White Way.

== Musical numbers ==
Act I

- "Let Us Take You Back" - Full company
- "Honky Tonk Lady" - Mutt & Jeff
- "One & One" - Mutt & Jeff
- "Don't Let It Get You Down" - Zimon, Mutt & Jeff
- "If You Can Prove I'm In Love" - Julie
- "On The Road Again" - Julie, Mutt & Jeff
- "Opening Night" - Julie, Mutt & Jeff
- "Dancer" - Jeff & Julie
- "If You Can Prove I'm In Love (reprise)" - Julie

Act II

- "One & One (reprise)" - Mutt & Jeff
- "Here's To Hollywood" - Peter & Company
- "Female!" - Julie, Mutt & Jeff
- "Julie (I Love You)" - Peter, Mutt & Jeff
- "Don't Let It Get You Down (reprise)" - Zimon & Julie
- "Lonely Song & Dance Man" - Jeff
- "Military Man" - Sarge & Company
- "Honky Tonk Lady (reprise)" - Mutt
- "Looking To The Sky" - Mutt
- "Lonely Song & Dance Man (reprise)" - Mutt
- "One & One" - Mutt & Jeff, Full Company

== Roles and cast information ==
Original off-Broadway cast

- Mutt Majeski - Peter Boynton
- Jeff O’Reily - Alan Nicholson
- Julie Allyn - Karen Kruger
- Oscar - Norman Goldenberg
- Sarge - Sharon Ann Murray
- Emmy (Mavis) - Marisa Post
- Peter (MC, Soldier) - David Bell
- Belmont (Sailor) - David Morton
- Toni (USO girl) - Anny Degange
- Bill (Hawkins, Soldier) - Robert Putnam
- Mike (Chuck) - David Strassman

Replacements:

- Mutt Majeski - Scott Bodie
- Julie Allyn - Carole-Ann Scott

Understudies:

- Mutt Majeski - David Morton, Scott Bodie
- Jeff O’Reily - Robert Putnam
- Julie Allyn - Marisa Post, Carole-Ann Scott
- Sarge - Jane Ann Ford
