= Richard O'Donnell (playwright) =

American dramatist

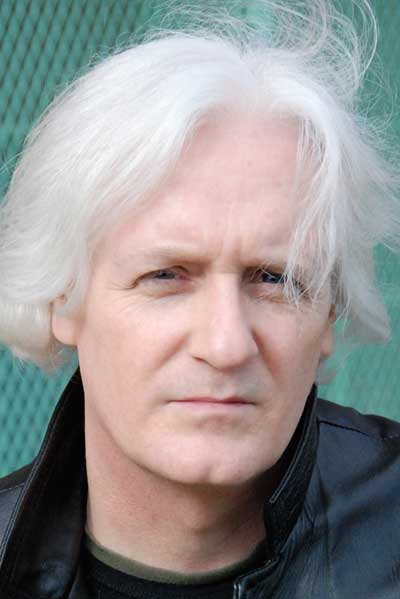
- Born: June 17, 1956 (age 70); Bryn Mawr, Pennsylvania
- Occupations: Actor, writer, comic, producer
- Years active: 1976–present
- Notable work: New Age Vaudeville; The TV Dinner Hour; One & One; Elmore & Gwendolyn Putts; New Variety; R. Rated; The Kreep; Black Pearl Cabaret
- Spouse: Vera Conroy (m. 1988–1992)
- Partner: Amy McKenzie (1982–1987)
- Children: 3

Richard O'Donnell (born June 17, 1956) is an American playwright, composer, lyricist, poet, actor, and stand-up comic. He has worked and lived in New York City and Chicago, where he has written and performed for the stage and television. O'Donnell co-wrote the ASCAP award-winning Off-Broadway musical comedy One & One, and Radio City Music Hall's Manhattan Showboat. He founded the New Age Vaudeville theatre company, the New Variety cabaret, the Black Pearl Cabaret, and St. John's Conservatory Theater. As a stand-up comic, he was the executive producer and host of the Fox, Chicago comedy variety television show R. Rated.

== Early life and education ==
Richard O'Donnell began in the entertainment industry as a professional ventriloquist. While in Jr. high school, he ran away with the Sells & Gray 3-ring tent circus at the age of 15, sleeping in the back of a truck that transported their elephants, Bessie and Anna May. O'Donnell was eventually forced to return home to finish school.

In 1974, he won a full scholarship to attend the Pennsylvania Governor's School for the Arts at Bucknell University, where he studied theatre under Broadway actress, dancer, and playwright Dr. Glory Van Scott.

In 1975, O'Donnell graduated from Penncrest High School, Media, Pennsylavania. While attending Penncrest, he studied theatre arts and dance under Judy Roman.

== Career ==
=== New York, New York ===
==== One & One ====
In 1978, at age 22, O'Donnell co-authored the book, music, and lyrics for the musical comedy One & One that played the Carter Theatre, in the Carter Hotel at 250 West 43rd street. It opened Off-Broadway on November 15, 1978, and O'Donnell won three American Society of Composers, Authors, and Publishers (ASCAP) Awards, shared with Dianne Adams (Vocal Arranger, A Gentleman's Guide to Love and Murder).

==== Manhattan Showboat ====
In 1979, for Radio City Music Hall, O'Donnell co-wrote with Scott Bodie Manhattan Showboat produced by Robert Yani, which celebrated over 100 years of American entertainment. It featured musical direction and arrangements by Tony Award-winning conductor Donald Pippin, and John Corry of The New York Times wrote, "Three Cheers! It is slick and attractive, even witty. It has style."

==== The Double R ====
In the 1980s, billed as "The Double R" comedy duo, in collaboration with screenwriter Richard LaGravenese, O'Donnell co-wrote and consecutively performed in several Off-Off-Broadway productions including Spare Parts, Blood-brothers, and Entrees at the 78th Street Theatre Lab, the Lion Theatre, and West Bank Cafe. The Double R were regular guests on the Linda Lichtman Comedy Hour, WNBC Radio, 30 Rockefeller Plaza.

On the college circuit, they opened for Leon Redbone and further developed their work in stand-up comedy clubs such as New York City's Comedy Cellar and Yuk Yuk's in Toronto. While working with O'Donnell, LaGravenese discovered he had a knack for writing dialogue.

=== Fish Creek, Wisconsin ===
==== Comedy Cabaret ====
In 1983, while living in New York City, O'Donnell was contracted by Tony Award-winning producer James B. McKenzie to create an after-show revue to complement evening performances of the Peninsula Players in Fish Creek, Wisconsin. The Comedy Cabaret, produced by Amy McKenzie and O'Donnell returned for a follow-up season in 1985 with O'Donnell's comedy revue, Dr. Funny Bones, presented by New Age Vaudeville in its own 75-seat theater at the Glidden Lodge resort, Baileys Harbor, WI.

==== Peninsula Players ====
While working the Comedy Cabaret, O'Donnell also took to the main stage at Peninsula Players, starring in title roles of Larry Shue's The Nerd and The Foreigner. Both comedies were given two-week extended runs because of ticket demands.

In 1984, for the Peninsula Player's 50th Anniversary, O'Donnell was featured on the cover of the Chicago Tribune Magazine.

==== Wish Wisconsin ====
In 1998, while living in Chicago, O'Donnell was commissioned to write the book, music, and lyrics for a new musical play entitled Wish Wisconsin, to celebrate the state's 150th birthday. Directed and produced by Amy McKenzie, it opened on January 2, in the Fish Creek Town Hall Auditorium. Songs included "Wish", "So Blessed", and "Oh!, Wisconsin".

=== Chicago, Illinois ===
==== New Age Vaudeville ====
In 1983, O'Donnell co-founded (with Amy McKenzie) the professional Actor's Equity theater company New Age Vaudeville (1984–1987). Throughout its run, O'Donnell produced, wrote, composed, choreographed, and acted in numerous productions with actors Amy McKenzie, Bobby McGuire, Caroline Schless, Del Close, Lisa Keefe, Megan Cavanagh, Michael Dempsey, Peter Neville, Todd Erickson, and Tom Purcell (executive producer of The Late Show with Stephen Colbert).

==== CrossCurrents ====
New Age Vaudeville was the first resident theatre company in CrossCurrents history. It was located at 3207 N. Wilton Ave. Noteworthy productions included O'Donnell's musical comedies An Evening With Elmore & Gwendolyn Putts, The Neighbors Next Door and The TV Dinner Hour (the later featured iO, formerly ImrovOlympic, founder Del Close as The Rev. Thing of the First Generic Church of What's His Name). Rick Kogan of the Chicago Tribune hailed both productions as "Among the most polished and clever productions of the season, a pair of devilishly inventive and challenging shows that won over critics and audiences."

==== Stand-up comedy ====
As a stand-up comic, billed as R. O'Donnell, he headlined numerous comedy clubs throughout the 1980s and 90s, including Zanies (where his headshot still hangs on the wall), the Chicago Improv, and Catch A Rising Star, and the Funny Firm where he was a regular headliner and also featured for such national comics as Brian Regan, Rick Overton and Bill Hicks.

==== New Variety ====
In the 1990s, O'Donnell co-executive produced and hosted the New Variety, which played, among other venues, at the 500-seat Chicago Improv Comedy Club. It ran for over two years, and was responsible for changing a faltering three-ring comedy presentation into a successful variety format.

The New Variety, which was hailed by the Chicago Tribune as "a cabaret for the 90's," was a fast-paced, ever-changing volley of acts that included award-winning jugglers, fire-eaters, comics, and sketch comedy groups including the all-girl Nude Coffee, the all-gay The Boys in the Bathroom, and the all-improv Upright Citizens Brigade.

==== Fox TV comedy variety shows ====
===== Twisted =====
O'Donnell produced and directed comedy segments for the 1993 New Year's Eve special Twisted, which aired on Fox TV, Chicago featuring Matt Besser (Comedy Central's Upright Citizens Brigade). He also wrote and directed commercials for McDonald's, Toyota, Jiffy Lube, and Ameritech, starring Besser and stand-up comic Michelle Garb in a stylistic homage to the works of Ernie Kovacs.

===== R. Rated =====
In 1999, as R. O'Donnell, he executive produced, wrote, and hosted R. Rated, which aired late night on Fox TV in Chicago. This comedy variety show included short works by the Annoyance Theatre featuring Rachel Dratch (Saturday Night Live), Mick Napier (The Second City), Tim Kazurinsky (Saturday Night Live), and Stephnie Weir (MADtv), among many other independent film and video makers.

=== Journalism and blogging ===
==== Stop Smiling magazine ====
O'Donnell has written for such national publications as Entertainment Weekly and Stop Smiling as well as having served under publisher J. C. Gabel as editor-at-Large for the latter.

==== Static Multimedia E-zine ====
He served as editor-at-large for cultural ezine Static Multimedia from 2004 to 2012. He also wrote a daily horror column titled Kreep's Korner and The Horror under his pen name B. R. Kreep.

For Halloween, October 31, 2008, O'Donnell's Kreep Blog on Static Multimedia and Super Unleaded Design was the cover story for the Chicago Tribune Movies page Screen Scene titled "Kreep-ing Along Poetically". It chronicled the history of his blog and podcast The Kreep, that reviewed horror films in poetic verse. It accredited his daughter Valia for encouraging him to go public with his Kreep character and poems.

In 2008, O’Donnell's blog The Kreep received a Coraline handmade box, numbered 46/50, assembled by the stop-motion animation team at Laika films, honoring their favorite bloggers.

==== B. R. Kreep ====
B. R. Kreep (a.k.a. The Kreep) is O'Donnell's pen name. He has a Gothic blog entitled The Kreep. This persona, according to Robert K. Elder of the Chicago Tribune, is, “…a Gothic poet and illustrator in the tradition of Edward Gorey.”

As B. R. Kreep, O'Donnell has penned numerous poems called Kreeplets as well as having written and composed over half a dozen full-scale musical comedies including An Evening With The Kreep, Kreepshow, Kreepmas, Mr. Scrooge, Twist, Kreepy Hollow and Alice Isn't All There.

=== Port Townsend, Washington ===
==== Poetry Scream ====
O'Donnell produced and hosted (sometimes dressed as The Kreep) the Poetry Scream on July 30, 2010. Now an ongoing event, it features five poets on stage, Thursdays at the Boiler Room in Port Townsend, Washington.

==== Black Pearl Cabaret ====
In 2012, O'Donnell founded the Black Pearl Cabaret with the mission to recruit a professional troupe of actors, variety artists and musicians to perform original works of a Gothic and macabre nature.

===== An Evening With The Kreep =====
In October 2012, Black Pearl Cabaret opened An Evening With The Kreep, a musical comedy with book, music, and lyrics accredited to O'Donnell's nom de plume B. R. Kreep. The show featured the Kreep's poetry and songs, and summoned a variety of haunting characters from the Kreep's darkest dreams.

===== Kreepmas =====
On December 20, 2012, the musical comedy Kreepmas opened. A Gothic and macabre twist on the Charles Dickens classic A Christmas Carol, it has a book, music, and lyrics by B. R. Kreep. Characters included The Kreep performed by O'Donnell, Albert T. Krumb performed by Jason "Ares" Altamirano, Kreepy H. Krawler performed by cellist Aidan McClave, Thaddeus Plum performed by Joey Ripely, Matilda Pift performed by Misha Cassella-Blackburn, and the two-headed Twipple Twins, Twinkle & Dinkle, performed by Cassella-blackburn and Ripley.

===== Bite Me! =====
On February 14, 2013, Black Pearl Cabaret opened Bite Me! at the Pope Marine Building. It is a musical comedy spoof on the famed vampire film Twilight. The book, music, and lyrics were by O'Donnell.

===== Kreepshow =====
On March 29, 2013, O'Donnell's Kreepshow was presented for an open-ended run. A 90-minute Gothic musical comedy cabaret, it played weekends at the historic Manresa Castle. Characters include B. R. Kreep performed by O'Donnell, Parthenia Goste performed by Misha Cassella-blackburn, Jack Frost performed by Jason Altamirano, and Kreepy H. Krawler performed by cellist Aidan McClave.

Steve Treacy, contributing theatre critic to the Port Townsend Leader, praised O'Donnell's artistry, “His writing, directing, acting and warbling abilities conspire to make him a quadruple threat. Even his spoken poems, especially “Little Annie Orkle,” are sparkling (no mean feat for that musty old art form).”

In a “Best Local Theater of 2013” article published in the PT Leader Arts Section, "Kreepshow," a Gothic comedy cabaret conjuring some spiritual denizens of our Victorian seaport,” was listed as one of the favorite locally written plays penned by Brazillia R. Kreep. Other nods included one of the standout acting performances by R O’Donnell as The Kreep, as well as outstanding achievements in directing and choreography (O’Donnell) and costuming (Lynne Casella.)

=== Ogdensburg, New York ===
==== St. John's Conservatory Theater ====
In 2014, O'Donnell founded the St. John's Conservatory Theater (SJCT), a professional troupe of actors, variety artists, and musicians. His vision was to create educational, inspirational, and professional opportunities for local artists of all ages while presenting original works based on folklore, literature, and fairy tales.

===== Alice Isn't All There =====
On October 10, 2014, at the St. John's Parish Theater the musical comedy Alice Isn’t All There opened. It was a 90-minute musical comedy with book, music, and lyrics by O'Donnell and accredited to his pen name B. R. Kreep. It is an adaptation of Lewis Carroll's classic Alice's Adventures in Wonderland.

===== Alice Isn’t All There re-staged =====
On June 3, 2016 Alice Isn't All There opened with an extended book, music, and lyrics by O'Donnell and accredited to his pen name B. R. Kreep.

===== A Kreepy Christmas Carol =====
On December 6, 2014 A Kreepy Christmas Carol, a musical comedy adaptation on the Dickens classic A Christmas Carol opened. It has a book, music, and lyrics by O'Donnell and accredited to his pen name B. R. Kreep.

===== Mr. Scrooge =====
Mr. Scrooge, a musical comedy adaptation of Dickens' A Christmas Carol, was a re-staging of O'Donnell's musical A Kreepy Christmas Carol with book, music, and lyrics accredited to his pen name B. R. Kreep.

Mr. Scrooge, with O'Donnell in the title role, opened December 15, 2017 at the multi-million-dollar, all-digital George Hall Theater, and opened again the following year on December 21, 2018 both for a limited runs.

===== Orchard of Hide & Seek =====
On July 9, 2015, the musical comedy Orchard of Hide & Seek opened. It was written, composed, and directed by O’Donnell.

===== Orchard of Hide & Seek re-staged =====
O'Donnell's musical Orchard of Hide & Seek was re-staged at the George Hall Theater. It opened June 16, 2017 for a limited run.

===== Kreepy Hallow =====
On October 16, 2015, The Kreep's musical comedy Kreepy Hallow with a book, music, and lyrics by O'Donnell and accredited to his pen name B. R. Kreep, and opened for a limited run. An adaptation of Washington Irving's classic short story "The Legend of Sleepy Hollow", it was also produced and directed by O'Donnell.

===== Twist =====
On October 7, 2016, O'Donnell's musical comedy Twist, an adaptation of Dickens' Oliver Twist opened for a limited. The production had a book, music, and lyrics by O'Donnell and accredited to his pen name B. R. Kreep, and was also executive produced and directed by O'Donnell.

===== Twist re-staged =====
On October 8, 2017 Twist opened for a limited run at the George Hall theater. The title role received a gender twist from Oliver to Olivia, something O'Donnell has established as a sort of signature with his adaptations (see Kreepy Hollow). The production was executive produced and directed by O'Donnell.

===== Kreepy Hollow =====
On October 26, 2017 Kreepy Hollow (renamed from Kreepy Hallow) was re-staged at the George Hall Theater for a limited run. The Ichabod Crane character received a gender change and renamed Ichaboda. It was executive produced and directed by O’Donnell.

== Personal life ==
O'Donnell is the father of Valia Dee, Tim, and Rich. He is the identical twin brother of Michael A. O'Donnell.

== Honors and awards ==
O’Donnell has received three ASCAP (1978) Music Awards – Off-Broadway Musical One & One (shared with Dianne Adams).

O’Donnell's blog The Kreep received an honorary Coraline handmade box, numbered 46/50.
