= New Variety =

NEW VARIETY
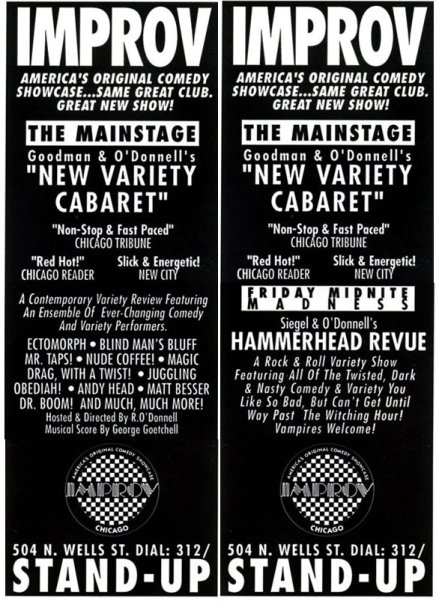
- New Variety Improv ad
- Company: Goodman & O'Donnell
- Genre: variety stand-up comedy jazz blues sketch comedy improv
- Show type: touring / clubs
- Location: Chicago Improv

Creative team
- Produced by: Thom Goodman, R. O'Donnell, Scott Siegel
- Directed & Staged by: R. O'Donnell
- Musical Director: Vince Willis; George Goetchell
- Production Design: Scott Siegel & O'Donnell

Other information
- Years Active: 1992-94

The New Variety was an American cabaret created and produced by Thomas Goodman and Richard O'Donnell. Active in the years 1992–1994, it was a fast-paced, ever-changing volley of acts that included jugglers, fire-eaters, stand-up comics, singers, musicians, and sketch comedy troupes.

== History ==
In February 1992, producers Thomas Goodman (founder of CrossCurrents Cabaret) and R. O’Donnell (co-founder of New Age Vaudeville) teamed up to present the New Variety, located at 400 N. Clark, downtown Chicago. Modeled after the vaudeville variety shows of the ‘20s and '30s, the New Variety presented an evening’s worth of acts that included jugglers, fire-eaters, comics, singers, musicians, and sketch comedy troupes.

=== Venues ===
==== New Variety Cabaret ====
The original location of the New Variety was the upstairs of the Italian restaurant Bellagio. Built specifically for the show, the cabaret was an elegant and intimate 100-seat theater, revealing a sophisticated art deco-style decor. The audience sat at round black tables with green and black chairs around a small black-and-white checkered stage, slightly raised.

Hailed by the June Sawyer of the Chicago Tribune as a cabaret for the 90s, the bill included artistic director and host Richard O'Donnell (billed as "R."), jazz band the Vince Willis Trio, juggler Andy Head, drummer Donny DeMarco Jr., tap dancer Ayrie King, stand-up comedy by John Tamborino, and saxophonist Sarah Underwood, followed by a crowning performance by the blues chanteuse Barbara LeShoure.

==== Improv Comedy Club ====
In August, 1993, the New Variety moved to the Chicago Improv, at 504 N. Wells, a 400-seat theater in which audience members sat at long tables in a room about the size of a high school cafeteria. Scott Seigel re-designed the original look of the stage to accommodate the New Variety's edgier feel.

The new venue allowed for changing a faltering 3-ring comedy presentation into a successful variety format. The New Variety now offered a more streamlined, commercial show. Acts included artistic director & host R. O’Donnell, stand-up comics such as Paul Gilmartin), Kevin Rogers, and Steve Seagren; and sketch comedy troupes including the all-girl Nude Coffee, the all-gay The Boys in the Bathroom, and the all-improv The Upright Citizens Brigade. Dr. Boom (who literally blew things up on stage) was the highlight of the evening.

== Regular Acts ==
- R. O'Donnell (host)
- Matt Besser
- Boys in the Bathroom
- Dr. Boom
- Ectomorph (Darren Bodeker, Bart Heird and Jim Kopsian)
- Andy Head
- Ayrie "Mr. Taps" King
- Nude Coffee
- Kevin Rogers
- Steve Seagren
- The Sound (a cappella group) (Paul Mabin, Greg Vaden, Kevin Kent and Keevin Peuse)
- John Tamborino
- Obediah Thomas
- Sarah Underwood
- Upright Citizens Brigade (Matt Besser, Ian Roberts, Ali Farahnakian, Adam McKay, Rick Roman, and Horatio Sanz)
- Vince Willis Trio
