= Black Pearl Cabaret =

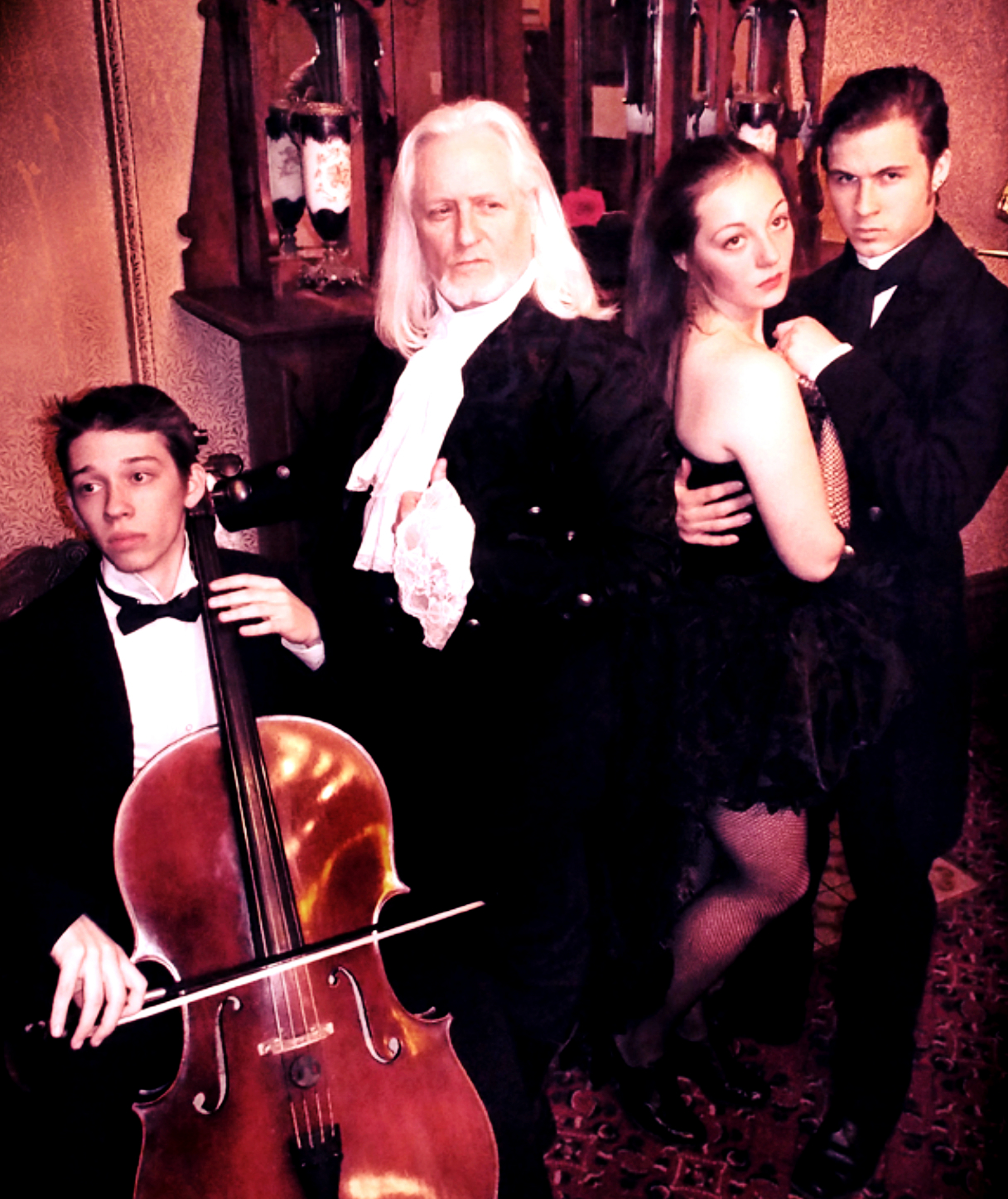
- Aidan McClave as Kreepy H. Krawler, R. O'Donnell as The Kreep, Misha Cassella-Blackburn as Parthenia Goste, and Ares Altamirano as Jack Frost
- Formation: 2012
- Type: Theatre group
- Purpose: Cabaret Theater
- Location: Port Townsend Washington
- Members: DJ Adams; Jason (Ares) Altamirano; Holly Stone Cabe; Alanna Dailey; Misha Cassella-blackburn; Aidan McClave; Amy McKenzie (Assoc. producer); R. O'Donnell; Marla Overman; Thomas Overman; Joey Ripley; Amanda Steurer
- Artistic director: Richard O'Donnell
- Website: blackpearlcabaret.wordpress.com

Black Pearl Cabaret is an American troupe of actors, variety artists, and musicians founded by Richard O'Donnell. They performed only original musical comedies of a Gothic, humorous and macabre nature, and were located in Port Townsend, Washington.

== History ==
Black Pearl Cabaret originally opened at the Undertown Coffee and Wine Bar, situated literally undertown at 211 Taylor St., in the heart of the picturesque Victorian seaport, Port Townsend, Washington, in October 2012. Later, they relocated above ground to the Victorian Manresa Castle at 651 Cleveland St, Port Townsend, WA.

== Theatrical Genre ==
Black Pearl Cabaret genres: musical theatre, satire, interactive theatre, improvisational theatre, variety show, circus, and vaudeville. BPC incorporated these genres in all-original musical comedies penned by Richard O'Donnell under his pen name B. R. Kreep.

== Productions ==
- An Evening with the Kreep - book, music, lyrics by B. R. Kreep
- Kreepmas - book, music, lyrics by B. R. Kreep
- Bite Me! A Twilight Musical Satire - book, music, lyrics by Richard O'Donnell
- Kreepshow - book, music, lyrics by B. R. Kreep

== The Undertown Productions ==
=== An Evening With The Kreep ===
Black Pearl Cabaret presented An Evening With The Kreep, a 90-minute theatrical with book, music, and lyrics accredited to Richard O'Donnell's pen name B. R. Kreep. It was presented by the Black Pearl Cabaret on October 25–27, 2012.

An Evening With The Kreep featured poetry and song and summons a variety of haunting characters from the Kreep's darkest dreams. Characters included The Kreep performed by O'Donnell, Parthenia Goste performed by Alanna Dailey, Jack Frost performed by Jason Altamirano, Ms. Autumn performed by Holly Stone-Cabe, and Kreepy H. Krawler performed by cellist Aidan McClave.

Songs included Welcome To My Lighthouse, See Me, Wish Myself, I'm Lamenting, and Halloween. The production was directed by Amanda Steurer.

=== Kreepmas ===
Kreepmas is a Gothic, macabre twist on the Charles Dickens’ classic “A Christmas Carol" with book, music, and lyrics accredited to Richard O'Donnell's pen name B. R. Kreep. It was presented on December 20–23, 2012.

Characters included The Kreep performed by R O'Donnell, Albert T. Krumb performed by Jason "Ares" Altamirano, Kreepy H. Krawler performed by cellist Aidan McClave, Thaddeus Plum performed by Joey Ripely, Matilda Pift performed by Misha Cassella-blackburn and the two-headed Twipple Twins, Twinkle & Dinkle, performed by Cassella-blackburn and Ripley.

Kreepmas included Cellist arrangements by Aidan McClave, costumes designed by O'Donnell and built by Mara Palmen, stage managed and by D.J. Adams. Songs included Kreepmas Celebration, Drink Up For Kreepmas, I'm the Ghost of Been There Done That, The Bells, Why Not For Me, and We Wish You a Merry Kreepmas. The production was produced and directed by O'Donnell.

== The Pope Marine Building Production ==
=== Bite Me! ===
Black Pearl Cabaret presented "Bite Me," a musical spoof on the vampire film Twilight with book, music, and lyrics by Richard O’Donnell. It was presented on February 14, 15, 16, 2013 at the Pope Marine Building on the pier in Port Townsend, WA.. Characters included Joey Ripley as Willy White, Misha Cassella-Blackburn as Ella Bran, Thomas Overman as Otis Bran, Ares Altamirano as Billy Sullen, Aidan McClave as Brody Sullen, R O’Donnell as Dr. Sullen, and Marla Overman as Asthma Sullen. Costumes were by Lynne Cassella-Blackburn, Set by Thomas Overman, stage managed by D.J. Adams, and directed and produced by Richard O’Donnell. Songs included Dear Diary, Sparkly, Like Me, So Very Hard To Be, and Bite Me.

== Manresa Castle Production ==
=== Kreepshow ===
Kreepshow is a 60-minute Gothic musical comedy cabaret with book, music, and lyrics accredited to Richard O'Donnell's pen name B. R. Kreep. It opened for an open-ended run on March 29, 2013, at the historic Manresa Castle in Port Townsend, WA. Characters include The Kreep performed by R O'Donnell, Parthenia Goste performed by Misha Cassella-blackburn, Jack Frost performed by Jason Altamirano, and Kreepy H. Krawler performed by cellist Aidan McClave. Songs include Welcome to My Castle, See Me, How I Miss the Circus, I'm Lamenting, and Kreepy Things. The production is produced and directed by O’Donnell, costumes and props by Lynne Cassella-blackburn, and stage managed by D. J. Adams.

Steve Treacy, contributing theatre critic to the Port Townsend Leader wrote of the troupe's skills that, “Overall the group’s singing and dancing numbers, including “I’m Lamenting” and “Creepy Things,” round out one's “good to be alive” evening.” He went on to praise The Kreep, saying, “His writing, directing, acting and warbling abilities conspire to make him a quadruple threat. Even his spoken poems, especially “Little Annie Orkle,” are sparkling (no mean feat for that musty old art form).”

In a “Best Local Theater of 2013” article published in the PT Leader Arts Section, "Kreepshow," a Gothic comedy cabaret conjuring some spiritual denizens of our Victorian seaport,” was listed as one of the favorite locally written plays penned by Brazillia R. Kreep. Other nods included one of the standout acting performances by R O’Donnell as The Kreep, as well as outstanding achievements in directing and choreography (O’Donnell) and costuming (Lynne Casella.)
