= Journal of Family Theory and Review =

- Discipline: Family studies
- Language: English
- Edited by: Libby Balter Blume

Publication details
- History: 2009-present
- Publisher: Wiley-Blackwell on behalf of the National Council on Family Relations
- Frequency: Quarterly

Standard abbreviations
- ISO 4: J. Fam. Theory Rev.

Indexing
- ISSN: 1756-2570 (print); 1756-2589 (web)
- LCCN: 2009214790
- OCLC no.: 712801407

Links
- Journal homepage; Online access; Online archive

The Journal of Family Theory and Review is a quarterly peer-reviewed academic journal published by Wiley-Blackwell on behalf of the National Council on Family Relations. Established in 2009 by founding editor Robert M. Milardo, the current editor-in-chief is Libby Balter Blume (University of Detroit Mercy). The Journal of Family Theory & Review has been accepted for its initial Web of Science ranking and impact factor in the Social Sciences Citation Index. The first impact factor will be reported in 2016, a two-year impact factor based on the journal's 2013 and 2014 volumes.

JFTR publishes original contributions in all areas of family theory, including new advances in theory development, reviews of existing theory, and analyses of the interface of theory and method, as well as integrative and theory-based reviews of content areas, and book reviews. Consistent with its mission, JFTR does not publish empirical reports with the exception of meta-analyses of content areas.

The journal draws from a broad range of the social sciences, including family studies, sociology, developmental psychology, social psychology, communications, gerontology, gender studies, and health. Families are viewed broadly and inclusively to include individuals of varying ages and genders, sexual orientations, ethnicities, and nationalities.

The Journal of Family Theory and Review has a blog, a Facebook page, and a Twitter account designed to facilitate the exchange and sharing of the thoughtful discussions of issues regarding family theory, integrative ideas, and methods. Family scholars, media and the general public are invited to participate in rigorous, thoughtful conversations. In 2015 the journal began to explore the development of digital scholarship and formed a board of scholars to develop strategies for engaging the public and a wider range of professionals.
