= National Council on Family Relations =

Nonprofit organization in Saint Paul, United States

- Abbreviation: NCFR
- Formation: 1938
- Founders: Paul Sayre; Ernest Burgess; Sidney E. Goldstein
- Type: Professional organization
- Legal status: Non-profit
- Professional title: Certified Family Life Educator (CFLE)
- Headquarters: Minneapolis, Minnesota
- Members: Almost 3,000 (2018)
- Board President: Anisa M. Zvonkovic
- Executive Director: Diane L. Cushman
- Website: www.ncfr.org
- Formerly called: National Conference on Family Relations

The National Council on Family Relations (NCFR) is an American nonprofit, multidisciplinary learned society dedicated to research on all aspects of the family. Founded in 1938 as the National Conference on Family Relations, it was renamed to its current name in 1948. Its current executive director is Diane L. Cushman. It publishes three peer-reviewed journals in association with Wiley-Blackwell: the Journal of Marriage and Family, Family Relations, and the Journal of Family Theory & Review.

The Ernest W. Burgess Award and the Reuben Hill Award awarded by NCFR are recognized as the most prestigious awards in the field of sociology of family.
