= Funeral March of a Marionette =

1872/1879 composition by Charles Gounod

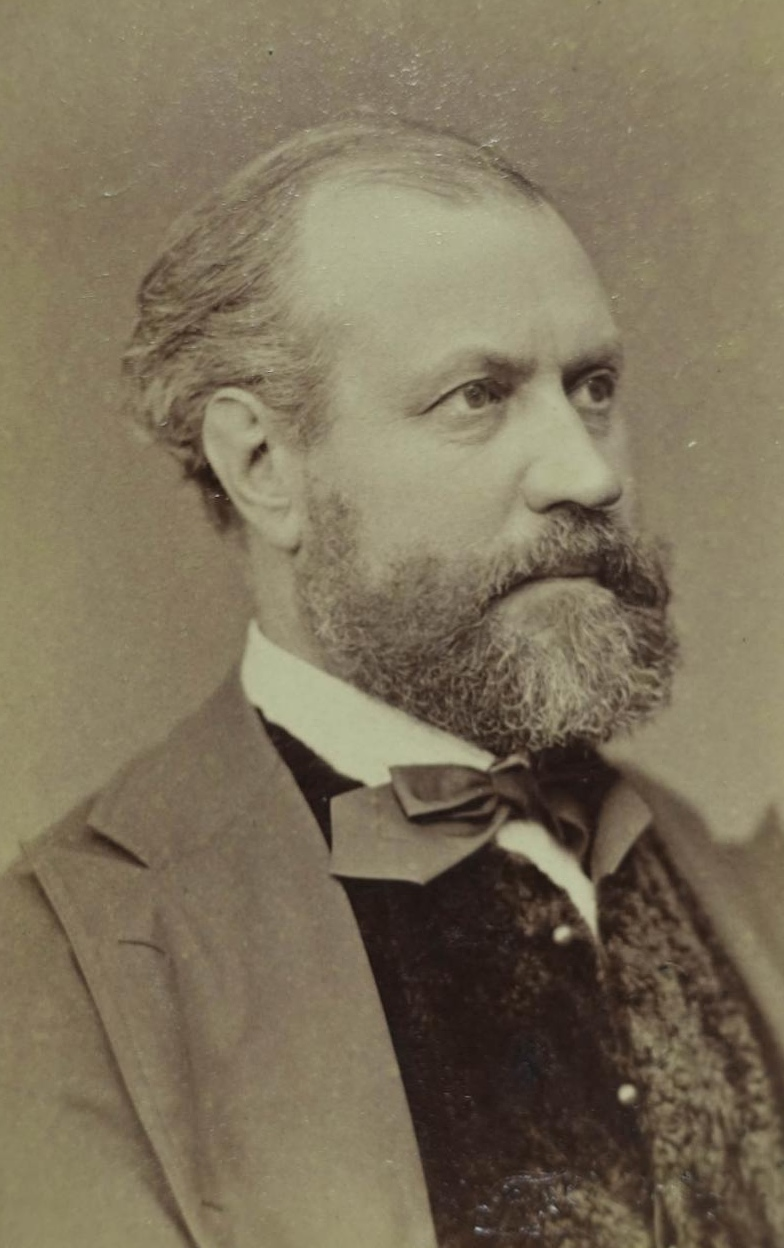
Charles Gounod ca. 1870

Funeral March of a Marionette
MIDI based rendition

"Funeral March of a Marionette" (French: Marche funèbre d'une marionnette) is a short piece by Charles Gounod. It was originally written for solo piano in 1872 and orchestrated in 1879. It is perhaps best known as the theme music for the television program Alfred Hitchcock Presents.

== Background ==
While residing in London between 1871 and 1872, Gounod started to write a suite for piano called Suite burlesque. After completing this piece, Gounod abandoned the rest of the suite. The piece was dedicated to Madame Viguier, a pianist and the wife of Alfred Viguier, the first violin in the Orchestre de la Société des Concerts du Conservatoire. In 1879, he orchestrated the piece with piccolo, flute, two oboes, two clarinets in A, two bassoons, two horns in D, two trumpets in A, three trombones, ophicleide, timpani, bass drum, cymbals, triangle, and a string section. The work is in the key of D minor with a central section in D major; the time signature is 6/8.

== Storyline ==
This storyline underlies the "Funeral March of a Marionette":

- The Marionette has died in a duel.
- The funeral procession commences (D minor).
- A central section (D major) depicts the mourners taking refreshments before returning to the funeral march (D minor).

Additionally, these inscriptions are found throughout the score:

- La Marionnette est cassée!!! (The marionette is broken!!!)
- Murmure de regrets de la troupe (Murmurs of regret from the troupe)
- Le Cortège (The procession)
- Ici plusieurs des principaux personnages de la troupe s'arrêtent pour se rafraîchir (Here many of the principal personages stop for refreshments)
- Retour à la maison (Return to the house)

== Use in films and television ==
The music was used to accompany at least four films in the late 1920s:

- Sunrise: A Song of Two Humans (1927; silent), directed by F. W. Murnau
- Habeas Corpus (1928; silent), with Laurel and Hardy
- Welcome Danger (1929), Harold Lloyd's first sound film
- Hell's Bells (1929), a Walt Disney Silly Symphony cartoon

Alfred Hitchcock had heard the music in the 1927 film Sunrise: A Song of Two Humans. In 1955, when choosing the theme music for his television series Alfred Hitchcock Presents, he remembered the effect that "Funeral March of a Marionette" had on him. Through Hitchcock's program, the music achieved its widest audience, although few people would have been able to identify the composer or title. The series continued for 10 years, and the theme music appeared in five versions by as many arrangers, in 1955, 1960, 1962, 1963, and 1964; the last version was arranged by Bernard Herrmann, who transposed the piece up a third. The "Funeral March of a Marionette" was one of eight compositions that Hitchcock selected to take to a fictional desert island on the 1959 BBC radio program, Desert Island Discs.
