= Degree completion program =

A degree completion program is an undergraduate academic program, most frequently found in the United States and Canada, that is offered within an established university but designed for non-traditional students. Degree completion programs are typically structured to allow persons who previously completed a substantial portion of the requirements for an undergraduate degree, but who have been separated from the university setting for a period of time, to complete the credit requirements needed to earn a bachelor's degree (B.A.), either at an accelerated pace, or a flexible schedule. The difference between credits previously earned, and those required for the award of a B.A., are made-up through a variety of methods depending on the sponsoring institution, but typically include a combination of traditional university courses and credit for prior learning through assessments like CLEP examinations.

== Examples ==
- Georgetown University bills its degree completion program as designed for students who were "meaning to complete" their bachelor's degree, but for whom "life, work and other obligations got in the way". Applications are accepted from working adults who have completed one or two years of university courses which can be transferred onto the potential student's Georgetown transcript. A series of evening and weekend classes fills the gap between credits earned and those required for a bachelor's degree.
- The degree completion program at the University of the Pacific is open to applicants who have completed 70-credits of university level course work. Once enrolled, students take a twice-weekly, evening class over the course of four semesters; those who successfully complete the 15-month instructional sequence are awarded a Bachelor of Arts in Liberal Studies.
- Colorado State University offers a degree completion program in psychology. Students can transfer up to 90 credits of coursework taken at another university before completing the final 30 credits required for a B.A. degree through distance learning psychology courses at Colorado State.
- University of San Francisco offers a Bachelor of Science in Management to working professionals who are interested in completing their degree. Students who have completed at least 60 semester credits may apply to the program and can earn their degree in as little as 23 months. Students take two courses each semester, and studies include accounting, finance, marketing, organizational behavior and theory, analytics, technology, logistics, and other core competencies.
- University of Nebraska–Lincoln offers an online Bachelor of Science degree completion program in applied science. Students select from a broad range of courses across the College of Agriculture and Natural Resources, in addition to the credits they've already earned, to tailor a degree to their career goals. This program provides a convenient and flexible career path for those in the military, currently employed, returning to college or transferring from a two-year college.
