= List of Benet Academy alumni =

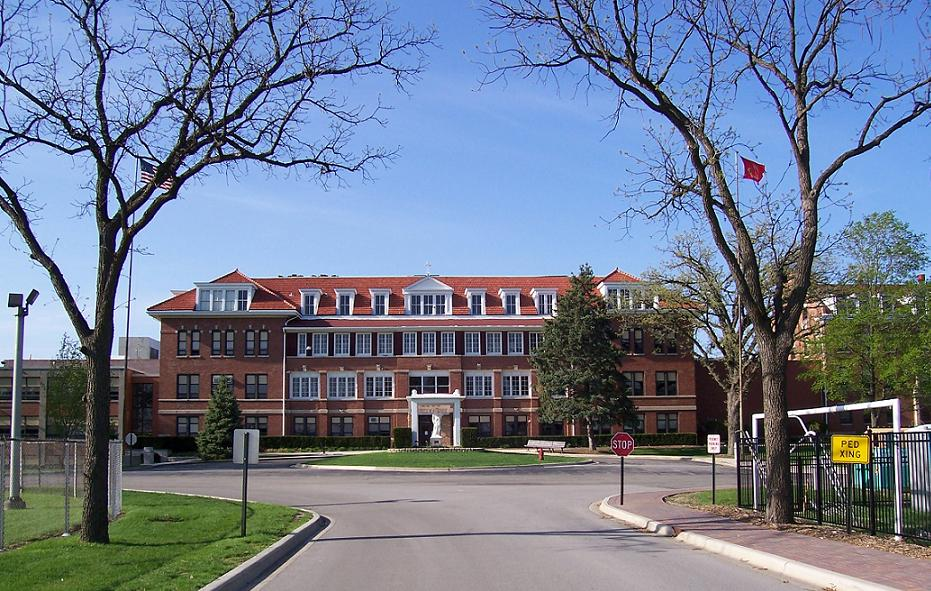
Front entrance to Benet Academy on St. Joseph Circle

Benet Academy is a college-preparatory Benedictine high school in Lisle, Illinois, United States, overseen by the Catholic Diocese of Joliet. Since its founding in 1888, notable alumni have included Olympic athletes, professional American football players, winners of Grammy and Academy Awards, and a former Illinois attorney general.

An alumni directory compiled in 1937 listed alumni who were members of the clergy, businessmen, physicians, educators, attorneys, musicians, and journalists. For the 2010–11 school year, 1,333 students were enrolled at Benet.

Most students come from Lisle, Downers Grove, and Naperville, but students expected to graduate in 2013 came from 65 schools and 34 municipalities in DuPage and surrounding counties.

Admission is competitive and primarily based on the High School Placement Test, a standardized test by Scholastic Testing Service, taken in January of applicants' eighth grade year (around age 13). The Chicago Sun-Times ranked Benet one of the top ten high schools in the Chicago area in 2003, and in 1999 Benet was one of two high schools in DuPage County, and 100 high schools nationwide, featured as an "Outstanding American High School" by U.S. News & World Report.

Formerly known as the all-boys St. Procopius College and Academy, the school began to offer a remedial course, or a course designed to bring underprepared students to competency, to only two students on March 2, 1887. Enrollment grew to 30 high school students by 1947. The academy began to operate independently from the college in 1957. The all-girls Sacred Heart Academy, founded in 1926, operated nearby. Due to dwindling enrollment and funding, St. Procopius Academy and Sacred Heart Academy merged in 1967 to form Benet Academy.

== Alumni ==
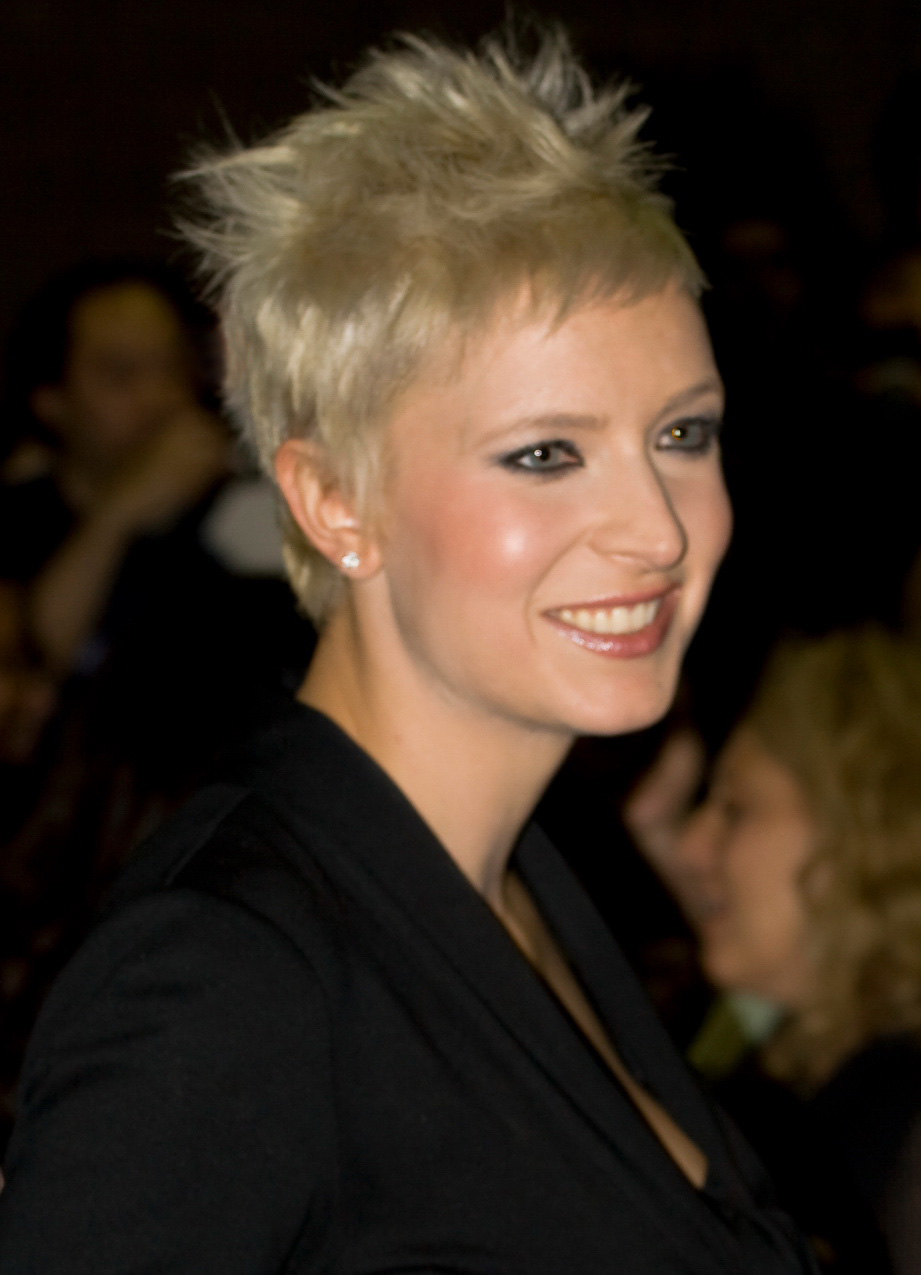
Diablo Cody, Academy-Award-winning screenwriter and author

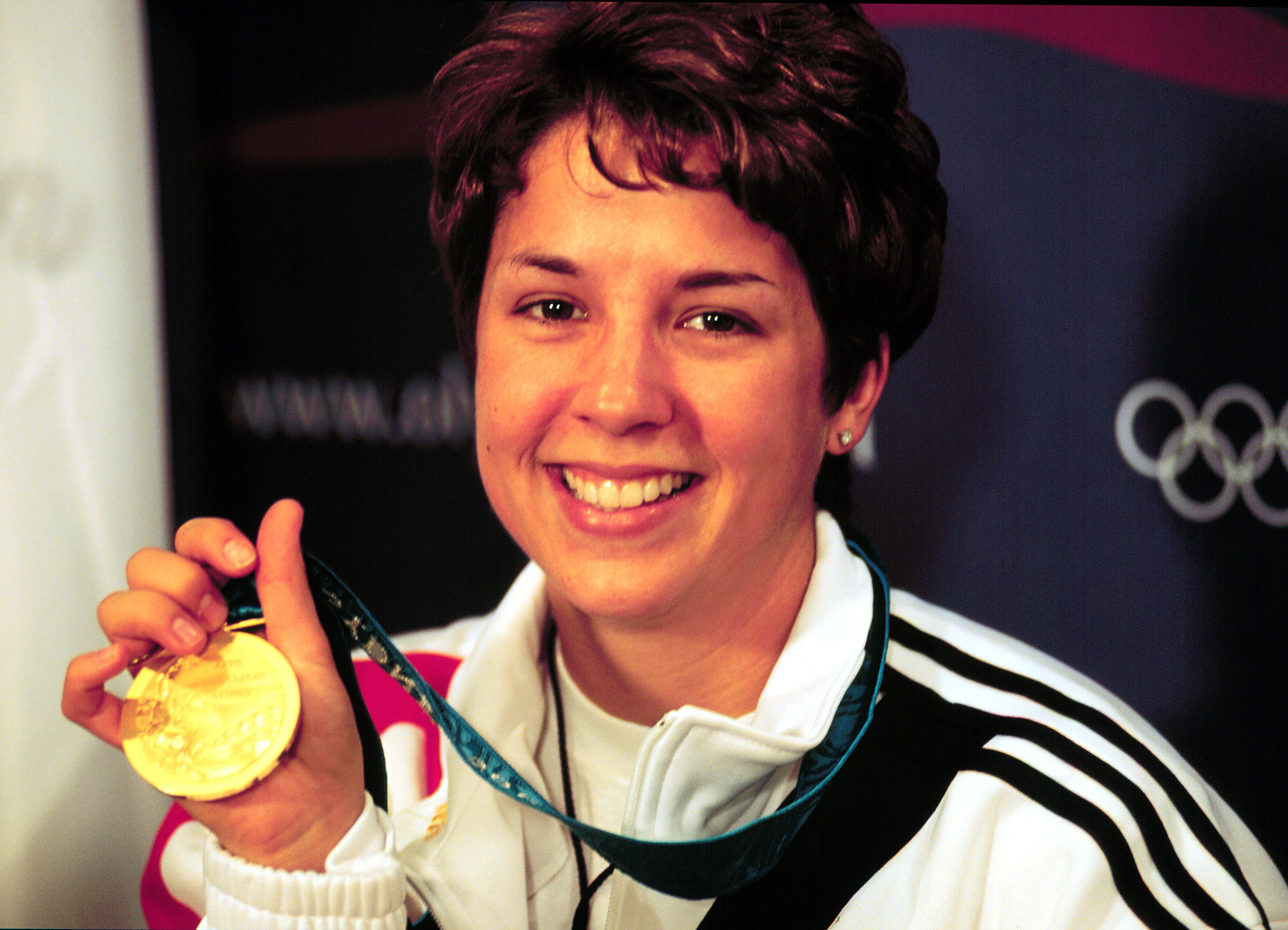
Nancy Johnson, Olympic gold medalist in air rifle

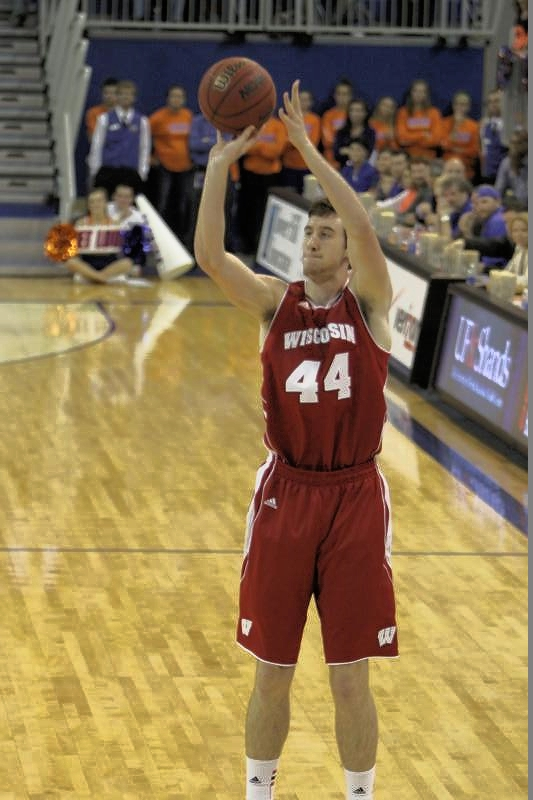
Frank Kaminsky, current NBA player, while playing for the University of Wisconsin

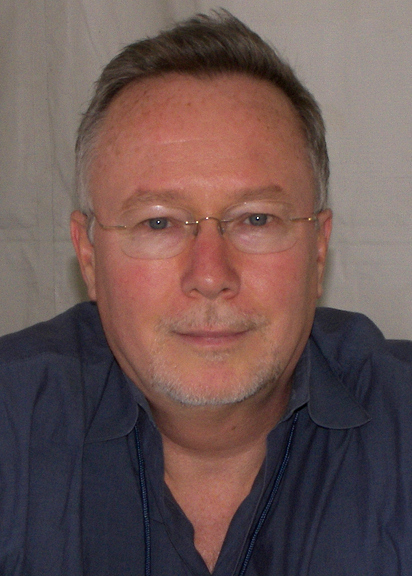
James McManus, professional poker player

Name	Graduated	Known for	Ref.
Kerry Abello	2017	Professional soccer player for Orlando Pride	
Robert Barron	1978	Priest of the Catholic Church, author, scholar, and professor of theology at the University of Saint Mary of the Lake, auxiliary bishop of the Archdiocese of Los Angeles	
Steve Baumgartner	1969	Former professional American football player who played defensive end for the New Orleans Saints and the Houston Oilers	
Dave Bickler	1971	Grammy-winning rock singer and former lead singer of the group Survivor, who also sang the rock star role in Bud Light's award-winning ad campaign "Real Men of Genius"	
Joan Biskupic	1974	USA Today journalist who covers the US Supreme Court and wrote biographies of Sandra Day O'Connor and Antonin Scalia	
Steven M. Biskupic	1979	Former U.S. attorney for the Eastern District of Wisconsin	
Diablo Cody	1996	Oscar-winning screenwriter of Juno	
Robert J. Conrad	1976	Chief judge of the US District Court for the Western District of North Carolina	
Mark DeCarlo	1980	Actor in The Adventures of Jimmy Neutron: Boy Genius and Sex Sells: The Making of Touché also hosted the game show Studs	
Kathleen Doyle	2016	Basketball player at the University of Iowa (2016–2020); Big Ten Player of the Year in 2020; silver medalist with the US national team at the 2019 Pan American Games; WNBA draftee as 14th overall pick by Indiana Fever	
Cameron Esposito	2000	Stand-up comic, actor known for Take My Wife on Seeso	
Meagen Fay	1975	Actress and former Second City comedian who has appeared on television programs including The Drew Carey Show	
Marita Geraghty	1980	Television and film actress; appearances include CSI: Crime Scene Investigation, Seinfeld, and The Luck of the Irish, Groundhog Day, Don Juan DeMarco and Heidi Chronicles	
Nancy Johnson	1992	Won the gold medal in the women's 10 metre air rifle at the 2000 Summer Olympics	
Frank Kaminsky	2011	Current center for KK Partizan and consensus national player of the year in NCAA Division I men's basketball in 2014–15	
Mike Lee	2005	Professional boxer 2010–present; record 21–0 (2018)	
Dan LeFevour	2005	Quarterback for Central Michigan University; later played for his hometown Chicago Bears and in the Canadian Football League	
John Lynch	1960	President and CEO of the Broadcast Company of the Americas; former linebacker for the Pittsburgh Steelers	
Justin McCareins	Did not graduate	Studied at Benet as a freshman only during the 1993–1994 school year; later played as a wide receiver for the Tennessee Titans and New York Jets; graduated from Naperville North High School	
James McManus	1969	Professional poker player and author of Positively Fifth Street	
Porter Moser	1986	Head coach of men's basketball at Loyola University Chicago; former head coach at Illinois State University and University of Arkansas at Little Rock	
Ben Murphy	1960	Actor best known for his work on the television series Alias Smith & Jones	
Dan Proft	1990	Political commentator and candidate in the 2010 Illinois gubernatorial election	
Jim Ryan	1964	Former Illinois attorney general and candidate in the 2010 Illinois gubernatorial election	
Greta Salpeter	2006	Lead singer and pianist for the band The Hush Sound	
Molly Schaus	Did not graduate	Studied at Benet as a freshman only during the 2002–2003 school year; later competed in the US women's ice hockey team in the 2010 Winter Olympics; graduated from Deerfield Academy in Massachusetts	
