= An Evening with Elmore and Gwendolyn Putts, the Neighbors Next Door =

1986 play by Richard O'Donnell

An Evening with Elmore and Gwendolyn Putts, The Neighbors Next Door
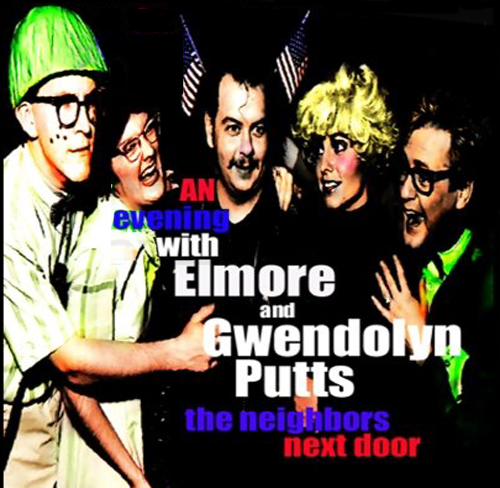
- Todd Erickson, Megan Cavanagh, Bobby McGuire, Caroline Schless, Richard O'Donnell
- Company: New Age Vaudeville
- Genre: Musical Comedy; Improvisation; Slapstick
- Show type: Open-run
- Date of premiere: October 31, 1986
- Final show: June 13, 1987
- Location: Crosscurrents, Chicago; Comedy Cabaret, Wis.

Creative team
- Producers: McKenzie & O'Donnell
- Director: Amy McKenzie
- Book Music Lyrics: Richard O'Donnell
- Production Design: Peter Neville

Other information
- Years Active: 1983-87

An Evening With Elmore and Gwendolyn Putts, The Neighbors Next Door is an American musical comedy, with a book, music, and lyrics by Richard O'Donnell, directed by Amy McKenzie, and performed by the New Age Vaudeville theater company in Chicago.

== History ==
=== Baileys Harbor, Wisconsin ===
An Evening with Elmore and Gwendolyn Putts, The Neighbors Next Door was originally staged at the Comedy Cabaret at the Glidden Lodge Resort in Baileys Harbor, Wisconsin, summer 1986 by New Age Vaudeville.

=== Chicago, Illinois ===
In the fall of 1986, The members of New Age Vaudeville relocated to Chicago, to be the first resident theatre company at the acclaimed CrossCurrents cabaret, 3206 N. Wilton Street.

Their first production, An Evening with Elmore and Gwendolyn Putts, The Neighbors Next Door officially premiered in Chicago at the CrossCurrents upstairs cabaret theater, October 31, 1986.

== Production ==
An Evening With Elmore and Gwendolyn Putts, The Neighbors Next Door is written by Richard O'Donnell, and was performed by the New Age Vaudeville Theater Co., members of Actors' Equity Association (AEA). The set and props were designed by NAV member Peter Neville, and the production was produced and directed by Amy McKenzie.

Because of her pregnancy, Amy McKenzie, who originated the role of Pamela, was replaced by Chicago actress Caroline Schless.

An Evening with Elmore and Gwendolyn Putts, The Neighbors Next Door was also praised for its originality by Chicago Tribune critic Rick Kogan, who wrote, "Nowhere are there jokes about yuppies, Harold Washington or the CTA. Instead, New Age Vaudeville seeks (and most of the time succeeds) to push the limits of what we have become to accept too easily as 'cabaret comedy.'" He called it "something of a Charles Addams cartoon ..." and said that the play "... displays a variety of comedic forms–from mime to slapstick, one-liners to thoughtful satirical jabs." Lawrence Bommer of the Chicago Reader said that the play has a "wizardry in blending 50's sitcom norms with comic impersonations."

== Play Synopsis ==
An Evening with Elmore and Gwendolyn Putts, The Neighbors Next Door, is a musical comedy farce that reveals one late afternoon in the life of a suburban family of nerds. The Putts are so dysfunctional, in fact, that when victimized and held captive by a home invader, a crazed biker named "Helmet Head" they thwart his plans to rob them and instead recruit him into their family.

== Roles and cast ==
=== Wisconsin ===
(+ denotes member of A.E.A.)

- Elmore Putts - Richard O'Donnell+
- Gwendolyn Putts - Megan Cavanagh+
- Clifford Putts - Todd Erickson
- Mel "Helmet Head" Farley - Bobby McGuire
- Pamela - Amy Mckenzie+

=== Chicago ===
(+ denotes member of A.E.A.)

- Elmore Putts - Richard O'Donnell+
- Gwendolyn Putts - Megan Cavanagh+
- Clifford Putts - Todd Erickson
- Mel "Helmet Head" Farley - Bobby McGuire
- Pamela - Caroline Schless
