= Bunhead =

Bunhead or Bunheads may refer to:

- Bunheads, an American comedy-drama television series created by Amy Sherman-Palladino and Lamar Damon
- BunHead Records, an imprint Kim Petras used to release music as an independent artist
- Princess Bunhead, a character from Thumb Wars and a parody of Princess Leia from Star Wars
