= Sex Sells =

"Sex sells" is a phrase alluding to the use of sex in advertising in order to help sell a particular product or service through sex appeal.

Sex Sells may also refer to:

- Sex Sells: The Making of Touché, 2005 comedy film
- "Sex Sells", 2021 song by Lovejoy from Are You Alright?

== See also ==
- CexCells, album by Blaqk Audio
- Sex cells
