= Peninsula Players =

Wisconsin summer theater

Peninsula Players Theatre
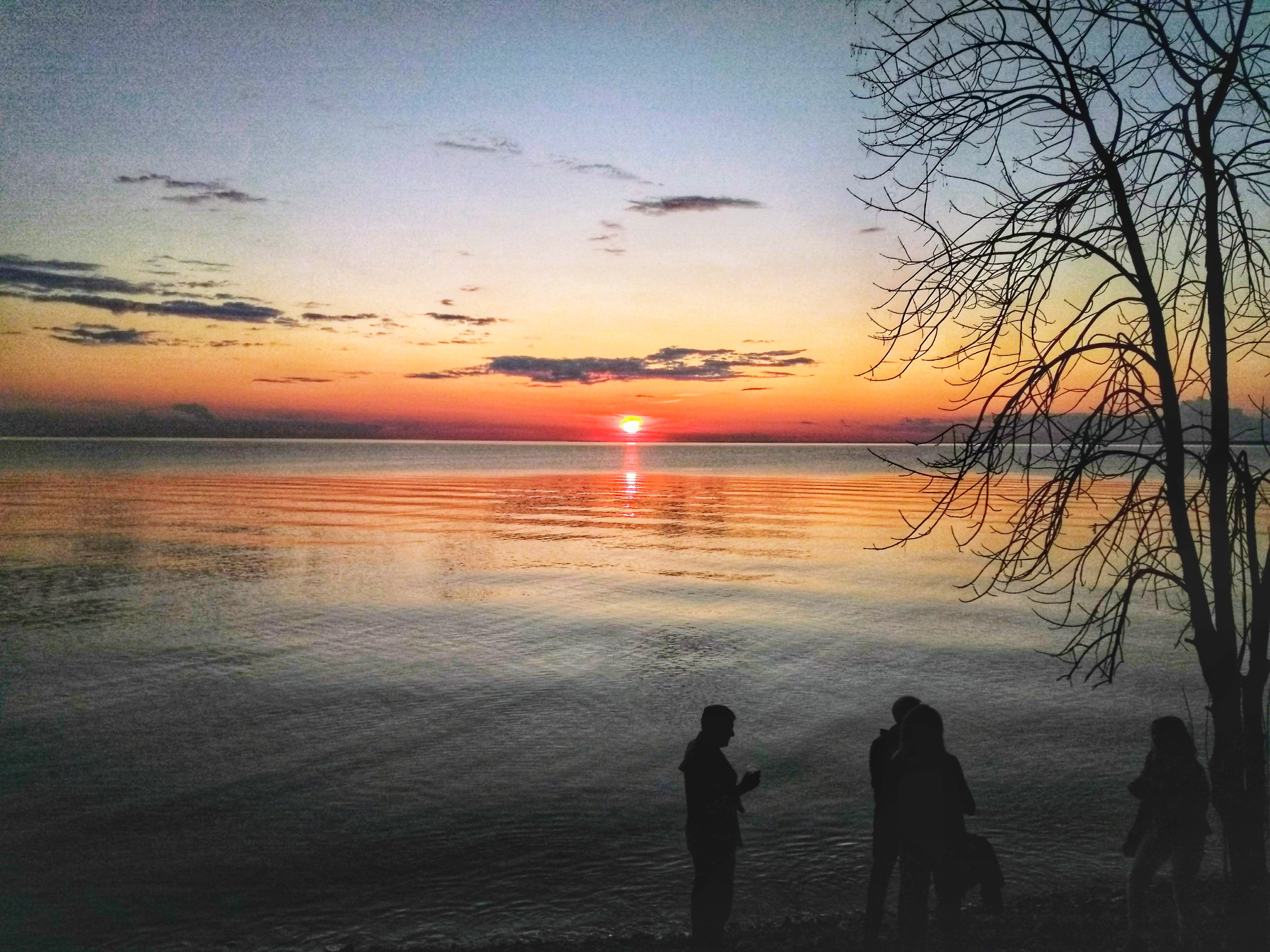
- Sunset at the Peninsula Players Theatre
- Formation: 1935
- Type: Theatre group
- Purpose: Summer Stock
- Location: Fish Creek, WI
- Members: Actors Equity Association
- Artistic director: Linda Fortunato

Peninsula Players Theatre is a summer theater located in Fish Creek, Wisconsin. Founded in 1935 by Richard and Caroline Fisher, it is known as "America's Oldest Professional Resident Summer Theatre."

== History ==
Peninsula Players Theatre was founded in 1935 by the brother and sister team of Caroline and Richard Fisher in a garden behind the Bonnie Brook motel in Fish Creek, Wisconsin. In 1937 the Fishers moved the newly founded theater to the recently vacated 22-acre (89,000 m^{2}) Wildwood Boys Camp, along the shores of Green Bay between the towns of Egg Harbor and Fish Creek. There they built a barn-like proscenium stage house for an audience sitting under the stars. This is the present site of the theater.

The original Peninsula Players stage was built with the help of Samuel Wanamaker, an American film director and actor who is credited as the person most responsible for the modern recreation of Shakespeare's Globe Theatre in London.

In 1946 a canvas tent was erected over the audience to provide some shelter from inclement weather, and in 1957 a new audience pavilion with open sides was built as a permanent structure. In 1960, the Fishers sold the theater at public auction, where it was purchased by Kenneth Carroad, a lawyer from New York City.

Carroad asked long-time “Player”, James B. McKenzie, to oversee business operations as producer. McKenzie accepted and in 1962 assisted in forming the Peninsula Players Theatre Foundation, Inc., a non-profit organization created to operate the theater. In 1978 Carroad sold the property to the McKenzies, who maintained ownership until 1993, when the Peninsula Players Theatre Foundation purchased the property.

Todd Schmidt organized more improvements for the Players, such as a new theatre and stage house, improved actor housing, new public restroom facilities, expanded and upgraded rehearsal and storage areas, a computerized box office, and new gardens.

== Executive Producers ==
- Caroline and Richard Fisher - 1935-1953
- Caroline Fisher and Rodion Rathbone - 1953-1962
- James B. McKenzie - 1962-2001
- Todd Schmidt - 2000-2007

== Artistic Directors and Resident Directors ==
- Caroline and Richard Fisher (Artistic Directors) 1935-1960
- Richard Fisher (Resident Director)
- Leo Lucker (Resident Director) 1955
- Jeanne Bolan (Resident Director) 1957-1976
- Bob Thompson (Resident Director/Artistic Director) 1953-57 and 1976-91
- Greg Vinkler (Resident Director/Artistic Director) 1997-2021
- Linda Fortunato (Resident Director/Artistic Director) 2021-

== General Managers and Managing Directors ==
- Caroline and Richard Fisher (General Managers) 1935-1953
- Caroline Fisher and Rodion Rathbone (General Managers) 1953-1962
- Tom Birmingham (General Manager) 1960-1984
- John Walker (General Manager) 1984-1986
- Todd Schmidt (General Manager/Executive Producer) 1993-2007
- Brian Kelsey - (Managing Director) 2008-

== Guest directors ==
- William Ball
- Maurice Gnesin
- Amy McKenzie
- Tom Mula
- Nancy Simon

== New stage house ==
In the fall of 2005 the Players ended their season early and demolition and construction began on a new stage house. The new stage house, which opened in the summer of 2006, has a full fly tower, a grass roof, cushioned seats, and solid walls that can be raised and lowered based on weather conditions. The new theater also has a radiant heated floor that allows performances well into October.

== Direct from Broadway ==
The Peninsula Players were known for getting the rights to Neil Simon plays not long after they opened on Broadway. Through executive producer Jim McKenzie’s association with Emanuel "Manny" Azenberg, Simon’s Broadway producer, he was able to negotiate the Midwest premières of a majority of Simon’s plays from 1963 through 1986.

Simon's “Biloxi Blues” made its Players debut on July 29, 1986, months after closing on Broadway. McKenzie gave Nancy Simon, Neil’s daughter, her first opportunity to direct when he produced the Peninsula Players production in 1986. In 1987, Biloxi Blues was re-staged by Nancy Simon at the Westport Country Playhouse in Connecticut where McKenzie also served as executive producer.

== Fall season ==
In 1981, actors John Walker, Pamela Gaye, Amy McKenzie, and a small troupe of artisans from the Players created the first Fall season. The play Children of a Lesser God, with Walker and Gaye in the principal roles was presented. James McKenzie remained executive producer until his death in 2001. The fall season continued with an additional play that opened after the end of the traditional summer theatre season.

== Comedy Cabaret ==
In 1983, while in New York City, executive producer Jim McKenzie contracted Amy McKenzie and Richard O'Donnell to create an after-show revue to complement evening performances at the Players. The Comedy Cabaret, produced by Amy McKenzie and written by O'Donnell, opened the summer of 1984. The Comedy Cabaret eventually opened in Chicago as New Age Vaudeville whereby they "won over critics and audiences."

== The Play's the Thing ==
In February 2010, Artistic Director Greg Vinkler established a winter play reading series The Play's the Thing, produced in coordination with Door County Reads. It is performed at Björklunden, the northern campus of Lawrence University in Baileys Harbor.

== Actor's Equity Association ==
Actors at Peninsula Players are members of Actors' Equity, the union of professional actors and stage managers.

== Awards ==
Peninsula Players received the 2014 Governor's Award for Arts, Culture and Heritage.

== Notable alumni ==
- René Auberjonois
- Megan Cavanagh
- Kip Cohen
- Pamela Gaye Walker
- Stacy Keach, Sr.
- Harvey Korman
- James B. McKenzie
- Amy McKenzie
- Jessie Mueller
- Richard O'Donnell
- Bob Thompson
- Ralph Waite
- John Walker
