= Amy McKenzie =

American producer, director, and actress (born 1959)

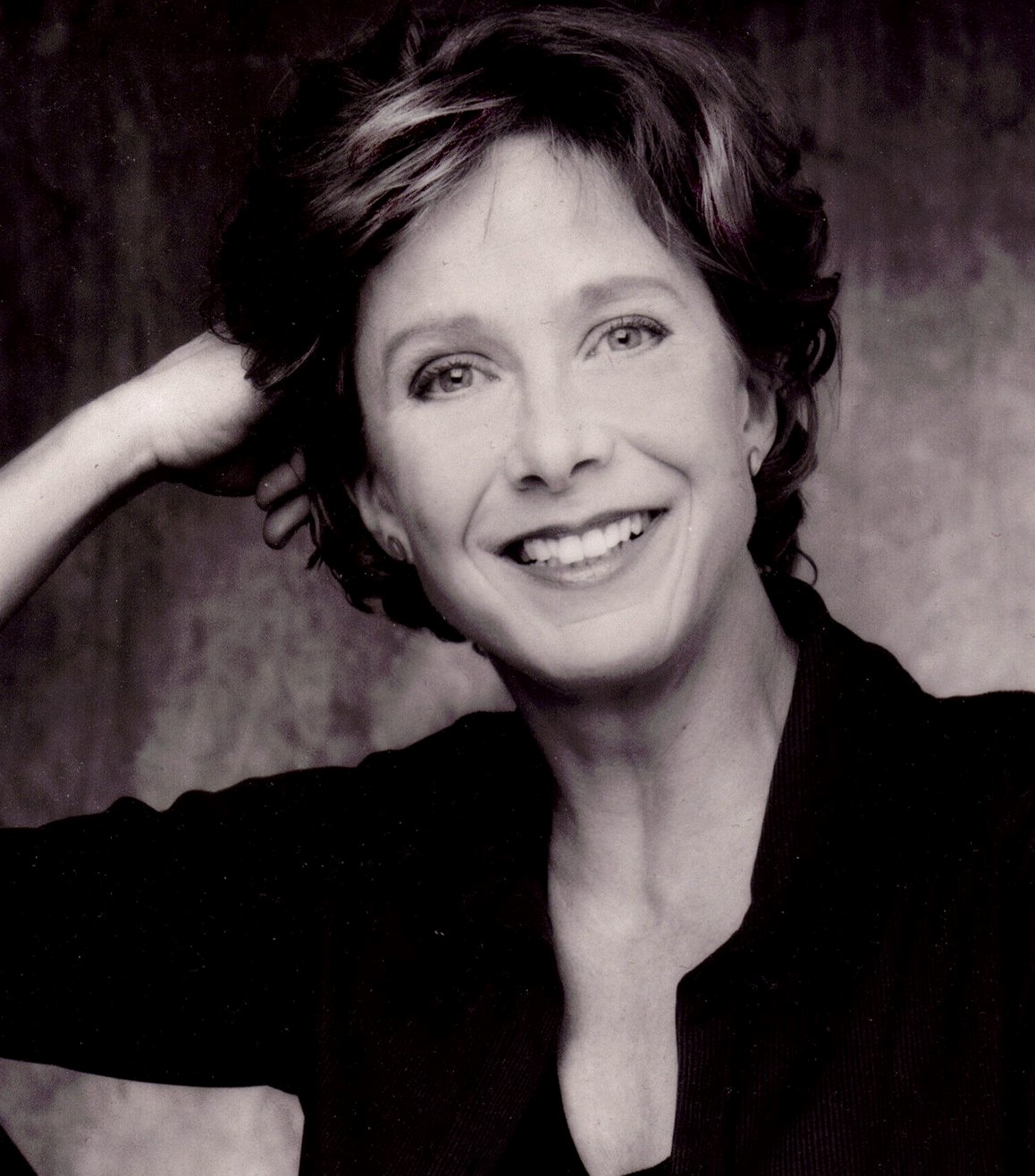
- McKenzie 2019
- Born: August 2, 1959 (age 66); Appleton, Wisconsin
- Occupation(s): Producer, director, actress
- Years active: 1972–present
- Notable work: New Age Vaudeville, The TV Dinner Hour, An Evening with Elmore & Gwendolyn Putts, the Neighbors Next Door

Amy McKenzie (born August 2, 1959) is an American producer, director, and actress. She is one of the founders of the New Age Vaudeville theatre company and the Third Avenue Playhouse.

== Biography ==
=== Career ===
McKenzie has worked and lived in Seattle, New York, Los Angeles, San Francisco, and Chicago, where she has produced and performed for the stage and television. She co-founded the New Age Vaudeville theater company as well as co-producing and directing their biggest cult hits, An Evening With Elmore & Gwendolyn Putts, The Neighbors Next Door and The TV Dinner Hour, both written by Richard O’Donnell and featuring herself, O’Donnell, Megan Cavanagh, Todd Erickson, Bobby McGuire, Peter Neville, Michael Dempsey, Lisa Keefe, Caroline Schless, Tom Purcell (writer for The Colbert Report) and Del Close. Rick Kogan of the Chicago Tribune hailed both productions as "Among the most polished and clever productions of the season, a pair of devilishly inventive shows that won over critics and audiences alike."

McKenzie has directed and acted in numerous productions at the Peninsula Players, America's oldest residential summer theater, as well as founding and producing their fall season in the early 1980s. She was on the board of directors for the Peninsula Players (before, during, and after its restoration) for over a decade, and was Artistic Founding Director of the Third Avenue Playhouse in Sturgeon Bay, Wisconsin, whereby she helped to convert an old movie house into a state-of-the-art performing arts theater.

In 1998, McKenzie produced and directed the new musical comedy Wish Wisconsin, written by Richard O’Donnell to celebrate the state's 150th birthday. It opened on January 2, in the Fish Creek Town Hall Auditorium in Door County, Wisconsin. Songs included "Wish", "So Blessed", and the show-stopper "Oh!, Wisconsin".

== Notable works ==
All credits are as producer/director, unless otherwise specified.

- An Evening With Elmore & Gwendolyn Putts, The Neighbors Next Door
- The TV Dinner Hour
- Dr. FunnyBones’ Carnival of Life
- Just Visiting (also co-writer)
- Wish Wisconsin

== Personal life ==
McKenzie is the daughter of Broadway theatrical producer James B. McKenzie.
