= Mark DeCarlo =

American actor, comedian, and travel

- DeCarlo with wife Yeni Álvarez in 2026
- Born: Chicago, Illinois, U.S.
- Education: University of California
- Occupations: Actor; comedian; television presenter; internet personality; foodie expert
- Years active: 1988–present
- Spouse: Yeni Álvarez (m. 2012)
- Website: markdecarlo.com

Mark DeCarlo is an American actor, television host, comedian, travel, internet personality, and foodie expert. He is mostly known for being a contributor to the WLS-TV morning show Windy City Live, a locally produced Chicago program that replaced The Oprah Winfrey Show in 2011. DeCarlo has been awarded three local Emmy Awards for his work on Windy City Live.

DeCarlo's first major media exposure came in 1991 when he became host of the dating game show Studs. He is also known for providing the voice of Hugh Neutron, Jimmy Neutron's father in The Adventures of Jimmy Neutron, Boy Genius for Nickelodeon, as well as portraying Alec Berg in the Seinfeld episode, “The Face Painter” in 1995. DeCarlo authored “A Fork on the Road: 400 Cities, 1 Stomach” which is a comedic travelogue & cook book published by Lyons Press.

DeCarlo rose to influencer-style fame on the internet in July 2021 when the character he voiced, Hugh Neutron, regained a cult meme following, attempted to get the Jimmy Neutron character into the Nickelodeon All-Star Brawl video game.

== Career ==
=== Acting ===
Prior to Studs, DeCarlo was a host on the cable network MovieTime before it became E! Entertainment Television. Early in his career, DeCarlo was a contestant on Sale of the Century, winning $115,257 in cash and prizes in 1985, and Tic Tac Dough in 1990. He also guest-starred as himself in an episode of Jonas and is now a regular on Windy City Live, a local morning show in the Chicago market.

DeCarlo hosted two more TV shows, Fox's extreme game show, Big Deal, and FX's late night talk show The X Show. He appeared on the game show Street Smarts in 2002, playing against Mark L. Walberg as part of a "Game Show Showdown", and lost the game with $1 to Walberg's $2. Since it was a charity episode, he still earned $500 for the M.S. Society of America. In 2005, DeCarlo starred in Sex Sells: The Making of Touché.

DeCarlo appeared on an episode of the show Interior Therapy with Jeff Lewis on Bravo that aired May 16, 2012. He co-hosted the TV series THIS vs THAT that premiered internationally in November 2012. He also had a small role on HBO's Curb Your Enthusiasm. In 2013, he hosted EconomicalECO, a how-to series that popularized ways to radically reduce the cost of living by choosing economical American products.

On a 1992 episode of Studs, DeCarlo hosted Ronald Goldman, at the time an aspiring actor who become well known two years later after being murdered along with Nicole Brown Simpson in Los Angeles on June 12, 1994, which led to the arrest and Trial of O.J. Simpson.

=== Voice-over acting ===
DeCarlo was the voice of Hugh Neutron on the Nickelodeon animated series The Adventures of Jimmy Neutron, Boy Genius. His voice over career includes roles in Back at the Barnyard, Planet Sheen, Johnny Bravo, Handy Manny and the Thumb series of comedies: Thumb Wars, BaTThumb and Thumbtanic.

=== Travel & foodie expert ===
DeCarlo hosted the Travel Channel's Taste of America with Mark DeCarlo for two seasons in 2004 and 2005, and is also known as the host of the early 1990s dating game show, Studs and the short-lived 1996 game show Big Deal.

In September 2022, DeCarlo and his wife, Yeni Álvarez, resumed travel for their podcast, A Fork on the Road, which they began in 2017 but set aside due to the COVID-19 pandemic.

=== Internet icon ===
DeCarlo hosts an internet sitcom called The Boffo the Bear Show, via Facebook Live and YouTube. Mark portrays a pompous blue bear in Hollywood who runs his own interview talk show and game show. The realtime-CGI technology created for Boffo was programmed by Julian Sarmiento, Global Director of Virtual Production and Real-Time at FuseFX. Mark has held several interview panels with his Boffo character using this technology at Comic-Con conventions.

On July 13, 2021, GameMill Entertainment announced Nickelodeon All-Star Brawl, a platform-fighter video game for Fall 2021. The same day as the announcement trailer, the hashtag "#HughNation" and Hugh Neutron began to trend on Twitter, as memes of Mark's character becoming a playable fighter in the video game circulated. What started as a joke began to build a serious cult following for DeCarlo's character to be included. As a result, a Discord server for DeCarlo's fanbase got DeCarlo himself involved, in which he fueled the community's desire for the character to be added. DeCarlo further interacted with his fans by reading submitted memes via Twitter, and later through his Cameo page.

On May 13, 2022, GameMill Entertainment released a reveal trailer for Nickelodeon All-Star Brawl's newest DLC fighters, including Hugh Neutron, which DeCarlo and his fanbase had been rallying for since the game's reveal. On August 5th, 2022, Hugh Neutron released as a paid downloadable fighter for the game. On the DLC's release day, DeCarlo and Debi Derryberry commentated a Nickelodeon All-Star Brawl tournament, consisting of twelve online content creators.

== Personal life ==
DeCarlo graduated from Benet Academy high school in 1980. He later graduated from UCLA. He married voice actress Yeni Álvarez on November 24, 2012. Being a Chicago native, he is also an avid Chicago Cubs fan as well and is often seen wearing various Cubs merch.

== Filmography ==
=== Films ===
Year	Title	Role	Notes
1988	Frankenstein General Hospital	Dr. Skip	
1992	Buffy the Vampire Slayer	Coach	
1994	Angel 4: Undercover	Joel Hemmert	
1994	Saved by the Bell: Wedding in Las Vegas	Freddie Silver	
1997	Three Days	God	
1997	Santa vs. the Snowman	Security Elf (voice)	
1999	A Fare to Remember	Jack	
1999	Thumb Wars: The Phantom Cuticle	Black Helmet Man (voice)	
1999	A Wake in Providence	Vinnie	
2000	Thumbtanic	The Interviewer, TV Anchor, Elvis, Lookout #2, Rich Man at Dinner, 'Shuffle Board Finals?' (voice)	
2001	Bat Thumb	Fred, Narrator, Bank Depositor, Millionaire (voice)	
2001	Jimmy Neutron: Boy Genius	Hugh Neutron, Arena Guard, Pilot (voice)	
2002	Reality School	Lazlo "Ted" Wozzeck	
2002	Santa vs. the Snowman 3D	Security Elf 1#, Flippy (voice)	
2002	The Godthumb	Thummy, Don Bazzarzini, Wartz (voice)	
2002	Black Hole	Malone	
2004	Raising Genius	Officer Hunter	
2004	Reality School	Style Coach	
2004	Raising Helen	Hockey Rabbi	
2005	Mobsters and Mormons	Carmine "The Beans" Pasquale / George Cheeseman	
2006	The Ant Bully	Fly who has Wings (Voice)	
2008	Immigrants (L.A. Dolce Vita)	Additional voices	English version only
2011	Johnny Bravo Goes to Bollywood	Jeeves	
2013	Summoned	Richardson	
2014	Finders Keepers	Ken Stevens	
2014	A Christmas Mystery	Harvey	
2016	Quackerz	Dancer	
2017	Fifty Shades Darker	News Anchor	
2017	The Babymoon	Fabrice	
2019	4L	Alain (voice)	English version
2020	Ballbuster	Earl	
2021	616 Wilford Lane	Micheal	Also executive producer
2021	Aliens on Halloween	Commander Jerek	
2022	A Cloud So High	Detetice Albert Trishelle	
2023	Amy's F**k It List	Mr. Dalmer	
2024	Pinocchio	Coot, Carlo (Voice)	Also co-writer and producer
2024	Shrek 2 Retold	Hugh Neutron (Voice)	

Scource iMDb

=== Television ===
Year	Title	Role	Notes
1987	The New Leave It to Beaver	Banjo Player	Episode: "A Slice of Life"
1990	Babes	Tony	Episode: "Everything but Love"
1991	Parker Lewis Can't Lose	Himself	Episode: "Aging Gracefully" (Uncredited)
1991-1993	Studs	Himself	Host
1992	Harry and the Hendersons	Tony Lane	Episode: "The Outing"
1992	The Ben Stiller Show	Himself	Episode: "With Flea"
1993	Matlock	Billy Joe Walker	Episode: "The Last Laugh"
1994	Burke's Law	Tom Keats	Episode: "Who Killed Skippy's Master"
1994	Goodnight America	---	executive producer
1995	Seinfeld	Alec Berg	Episode: "The Face Painter"
1995	High Tide	Larry Brisken	Episode: "Bikini Patrol"
1995-1996	Duckman	Unknown (Voice)	Episodes: "Papa Oom M.O.W. M.O.W." "Exile in Guyville"
1997	Boy Meets World	Brett McInerny	Episode: "Quiz Show"
1997	Rugrats	Rob Hackett (Voice)	Episode: "America's Wackiest Home Movies/The 'Lympics"
1997	Aaahh!!! Real Monsters	Pitch Monster (Voice)	Episode: "Side by Side/Hooked on Phobics"
1997	You Wish	Cable Repairman	Episode: "Holloween"
1997-1999	Tracey Takes On	Guy Lamel	Episodes: "Vegas," "Dating"
2001	Curb Your Enthusiasm	Albert Mayo	Episode: "Shaq"
2002-2006	The Adventures of Jimmy Neutron, Boy Genius	Hugh Neutron, General Ernest Abercrombie, Mayor Quador, Baby Eddie Neutron, Additional Voices (Voice)	Main Role, Also performed songs, "Basking the Warmth," and "Pule Song" in "Holly Jolly Jimmy"
2004	Oliver Beene	Buddy Fotaine	Episode: "Idol Chatter"
2004-2006	The Jimmy Timmy Power Hour	Hugh Neutron (voice)	TV Movie
2005-	Taste of America	---	Host
2006	Las Vegas	Storm Reno	Episode: "And Here's Mike with the Weather"
2006	The Ant Bully (TV Shorts)	Ant #1, Fly who has Wings (Voice)	Episode: "Hot Enough for You?" "World Wide Web"
2006	Malcolm in the Middle	Announcer	Episode: "Bomb Shelter"
2007-2008	Back at the Barnyard	Bingo the Chimpanzee, Bee #1, Chubs, Mr. Jinks, Mayor Termite (Voice)	4 Episodes
2007-2009	Family Guy	Lennie Briscoe, Dr. Jake Houseman (Voice)	Episodes: "Padre de Familia," "FOX-y Lady"
2008	Wizards of Waverly Place	Cupid (voice)	Episode: "Baby Cupid"
2011	Planet Sheen	Brain Flower (Voice)	Episode: "Washing My Sheen/Stuck in the Riddle with You"
2011-2012	Handy Manny	Lefty (Voice)	Episode: "The Tools New Team," "Hank's Birthday"
2012	The Middle	Mr. Morrison	Episode: "The Second Act"
2014	Baby Daddy	Frankie DeLuca	Episode: "Send in the Clowns"
2015	The Thundermans	Chili D. Williams	Episode: "Give Me a Break Up"
2016	Hidden America with Jonah Ray	Harold Perez	Episode: "Los Angeles: All That Glitters Is Not Gold"
2018	Lucifer	Chance	Episode: "The Last Heartbreak"
2018	For The People	Anchor	Episode: "Everybody's a Superhero"
2018	Mexiguin	Warden Payne (Voice)	Episode: "Prison Penguins"
2020	The Rookie	Teddy's Father	Episode: "Casualties"
2020-2021	Boffo the Bear Show	Boffo, Hugh Neutron (Voice)	Main Role, also Writer, and Director
2021-	Ronstadt	T.O.O.L	6 Episodes, Podcast
2023	The Loud House	Bosley (Voice)	Episode: "Road Trip: Bringing Down the House/Road Trip: Mountain Hard Pass"

=== Video games ===
Year	Title	Role	Notes
2001	Jimmy Neutron: Boy Genius (PC)	Hugh Neutron	
2002	Jimmy Neutron vs. Jimmy Negatron	Hugh Neutron, Narrator	
2002	Jimmy Neutron Boy Genius (Console)	Hugh Neutron, Oobar, Elite Guard	
2004	The Adventures of Jimmy Neutron Boy Genius: Attack of the Twonkies	Hugh Neutron	
2021	Nickelodeon All-Star Brawl	Hugh Neutron	
2023	Nickelodeon All-Star Brawl 2	Hugh Neutron	
2026	Mewgenics	Cats	Creature role
2026	Grand Theft Auto VI	The Local Population	
