= Big Deal (game show) =

- Presented by: Mark DeCarlo
- Narrated by: John Cramer
- Country of origin: United States
- No. of seasons: 1
- No. of episodes: 6

Production
- Running time: 60 minutes
- Production companies: Stone-Stanley Productions; New World Entertainment

Original release
- Network: FOX
- Release: September 1 – October 6, 1996

Related
- Let's Make a Deal

Big Deal is an American television game show that aired in 1996 on the Fox network. The show is an adaptation of Let's Make a Deal. It was hosted by Mark DeCarlo and packaged by Stone-Stanley Productions, with swing group Big Bad Voodoo Daddy as the house band.

Due to low ratings, it lasted six episodes (only three of which were seen in their entirety by East Coast viewers, due to NFL doubleheaders). It was announced in TV Guide that the series would return for 1997, in a half-hour format with Heidi Mark joining DeCarlo as co-host, but ultimately never returned to the schedule.

== Format ==
The show's format followed that of Let's Make a Deal; however, stunts similar to those featured on Truth or Consequences were also played. Some of these stunts were played in order to earn a smaller prize, which could then be gambled for an unknown behind a curtain or a box, and other stunts awarded different prizes based on how well (or how poorly) the contestant performed.

Some of the games played involved the contestants participating in the studio itself:

- A contestant was hooked to a giant "skill crane" and given the appropriate oversized grabbers, with which they had to retrieve large teddy bears while being raised and lowered by their partner. Each bear represented a money amount or a prize, and the contestant could retrieve as many or as few of the bears as they wanted. However, one bear had a human inside of it, and attempting to grab this bear would "scare" it, the bear would run away, and the team lost everything.
- Contestants had to listen to a popular song being sung by a fat lady, a Wagnerian Valkyrie performed by Anne-Marie Bosche' Clinkenbeard (and thus butchered from its original form); guessing the song correctly won a prize.
- A contestant was positioned on top of a small "building', and a chimpanzee was placed on an identical "building" in a "man vs. monkey" game. In a tribute to King Kong, the man raced the chimp to swat toy airplanes out of the "sky" (actually suspended from modified ceiling fans that rotated). Beating the monkey won the prize.
- Couples raced to launch small teddy bears at a spiked wall with a slingshot; the couple "killing" the most bears won a prize.
- DeCarlo once asked if anyone in the studio audience wanted to "kill" the show's enormous frog mascot (actually a large prop built onstage in the stunt area). Then he selected someone from the audience, who had 30 seconds to shovel pennies onto a scale. After the time ran out, the player had the option of either taking a bribe or seeing if he had shoveled at least 200 pounds (91 kg) of pennies onto the scale. Success meant that the player won a large prize, plus as much money as shoveled onto the scale. Whether the player took the bribe or played for the large prize, if there was at least 200 pounds of pennies on the scale, a giant anvil was dropped onto the frog.

Notable to many of these stunts was the overt destruction by the contestant to his own property in an attempt to win a better prize. Examples of such stunts included:

- Throwing baseballs at the windows of one's house in order to win new furnishings (and new windows) for the home;
- Destroying one's own automobile with a sledgehammer – the contestant had 60 seconds, and at the end of that time, if the car was judged by an insurance appraiser – (Tim Davis from SCA Appraisal Company) to be totaled, (Note: According to California law at the time, the car was considered totaled if the damage exceeded 75% of the Kelley Blue Book value of the car.) the contestant won a brand new car;
- Dropping one's own possessions (such as TV sets, golf clubs, etc.) off of a crane onto a giant tic-tac-toe board; getting three in a row won a larger prize package.

While DeCarlo played up the fact that losing one of these games resulted in nothing more than a tragic loss, a disclaimer at the end of every episode stated that contestants who damaged their own possessions would be reimbursed money according to the value of their belongings before they were destroyed.

The Big Deal of the evening was played like earlier versions of Let's Make a Deal. DeCarlo would go back into the audience and invite contestants who had won something to trade their prize(s) in for a shot at the Big Deal, starting with the top winner and working downward. After two players were selected, they were presented with three large screens, one of which contained the Big Deal, a prize package usually worth more than any other prize offered that day. The top winner got first selection, and the contents of each of the three screens were revealed, usually in ascending order.

== Proposed revival ==
In 1998, Buena Vista Television (now Disney Media and Entertainment Distribution) wanted to revive Let's Make a Deal with Gordon Elliott as host, planning to launch it for syndication in the fall 1999 season, but the planned revival never made it to air.

Let's Make a Deal eventually resurfaced on NBC in primetime in 2003 with Billy Bush as host, but this was version cancelled due to low ratings. The show was then revived again in daytime on CBS in 2009 with Wayne Brady as host.
