= New Age Vaudeville =

American theater troupe

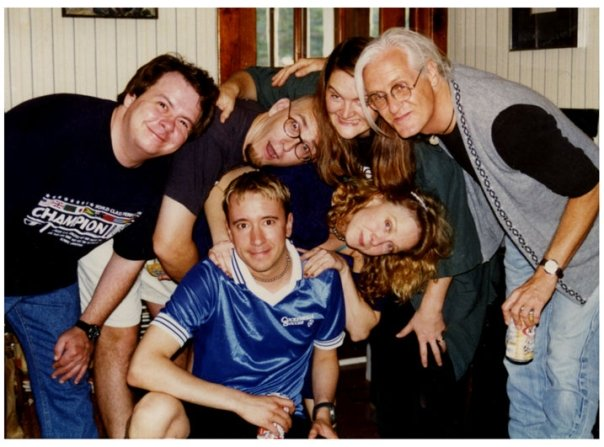
- New Age Vaudeville with Bobby McGuire, Todd Erickson, Peter Neville, Megan Cavanagh, Amy Mckenzie, and Richard O'Donnell
- Notable work: An Evening with Elmore & Gwendolyn Putts - The Neighbors Next Door; The TV Dinner Hour; Dr. Funny Bones; Just Visiting

Comedy career
- Years active: 1983–1987
- Medium: Theatre; Television video
- Genres: Sketch comedy Musical Theatre; Improvisation

New Age Vaudeville was an American professional theater troupe founded by Richard O'Donnell and Amy McKenzie, and was part of the Chicago comedy boom of the 1980s.

== History ==
=== Peninsula Players' Comedy Cabaret ===
In New York City, March 1983, Peninsula Players’ producer, James B. McKenzie contracted Amy McKenzie and Richard O'Donnell to create, develop and perform in an after-show revue at the Peninsula Players in Fish Creek, Wisconsin.

Billed as the Comedy Cabaret, it featured sketch comedy, improvisation, song, and dance performed by members of the Peninsula Players to a late night audience.

=== New Age Vaudeville ===
The Comedy Cabaret returned to Door County the following summer billed as New Age Vaudeville, in its own 75-seat theatre at the summer resort Glidden Lodge in Baileys Harbor, WI.

=== Chicago and CrossCurrents cabaret ===
In the fall of 1986, Richard O’Donnell and Amy McKenzie relocated their theater company to Chicago. New Age Vaudeville established a residency at CrossCurrents cabaret, 3206 N. Wilton. They were contracted by owner Thomas Goodman, who stated, "Not only does New Age Vaudeville christen our new performance space...they are the first resident group in our history."

Throughout their 4-year run, O'Donnell co-produced and wrote while McKenzie co-produced and directed numerous productions starring themselves and actors Megan Cavanagh, Todd Erickson, Bobby McGuire, Peter Neville, Michael Dempsey, Caroline Schless, Lisa Keefe, Tom Purcell, and Del Close.

== Cult-hits ==
Sited by The Chicago Tribune as "...a rarity, an ensemble`s ensemble, they gained a reputation for their wizardry in blending 50’s sitcom norms with comic impersonations. An Evening with Elmore & Gwendolyn Putts - The Neighbors Next Door and The TV Dinner Hour (featuring Del Close on video improvising as The Rev. Thing of the first Generic Church of what's-his-name) were among their biggest cult-hits. Rick Kogan of the Chicago Tribune hailed both works as "Among the most polished and clever productions of the season, a pair of devilishly inventive and challenging shows that won over critics and audiences.

== Notable works ==
An Evening with Elmore & Gwendolyn Putts - The Neighbors Next Door (book, music, lyrics: Richard O'Donnell)
The TV Dinner Hour (book, music, lyrics: Richard O'Donnell with additional material by Del Close as Rev. Thing)
Dr. FunnyBones’ Carnival of Life (book, music, lyrics: Richard O'Donnell)
Just Visiting (book, music, lyrics: Megan Cavanagh, Richard O'Donnell, Amy McKenzie, Todd Erickson, Bobby McGuire, Peter Neville, and Tom Purcell)

== Members ==
(*denotes original member) (+denotes member of A.E.A.)

- Megan Cavanagh*+
- Michael Dempsey
- Del Close+
- Todd Erickson*
- Uncle Jake*
- Janet Klutterman*
- Lisa Keefe
- Bobby McGuire*
- Amy McKenzie*+
- Peter Neuville*
- Tom Purcell
- Richard O’Donnell*+
- Caroline Schless
- Larry Zambello*
- Thomas Goodman

== Noted Accomplishments ==
Successfully negotiated an Actors' Equity (AEA) cabaret contract in Chicago: Ticket sales vs. drink revenue, whereby drink revenue, owned by the owners of the bar were not included in ticket sale revenue while establishing actor's weekly compensation.

New Age Vaudeville were the first resident theatre group in the history of the CrossCurrents cabaret in Chicago.

One a few comedy troupes in Chicago to use video monitors playing scripted and improvised pre-taped intros and fillers.
