= Megan Cavanagh (actress) =

American actress

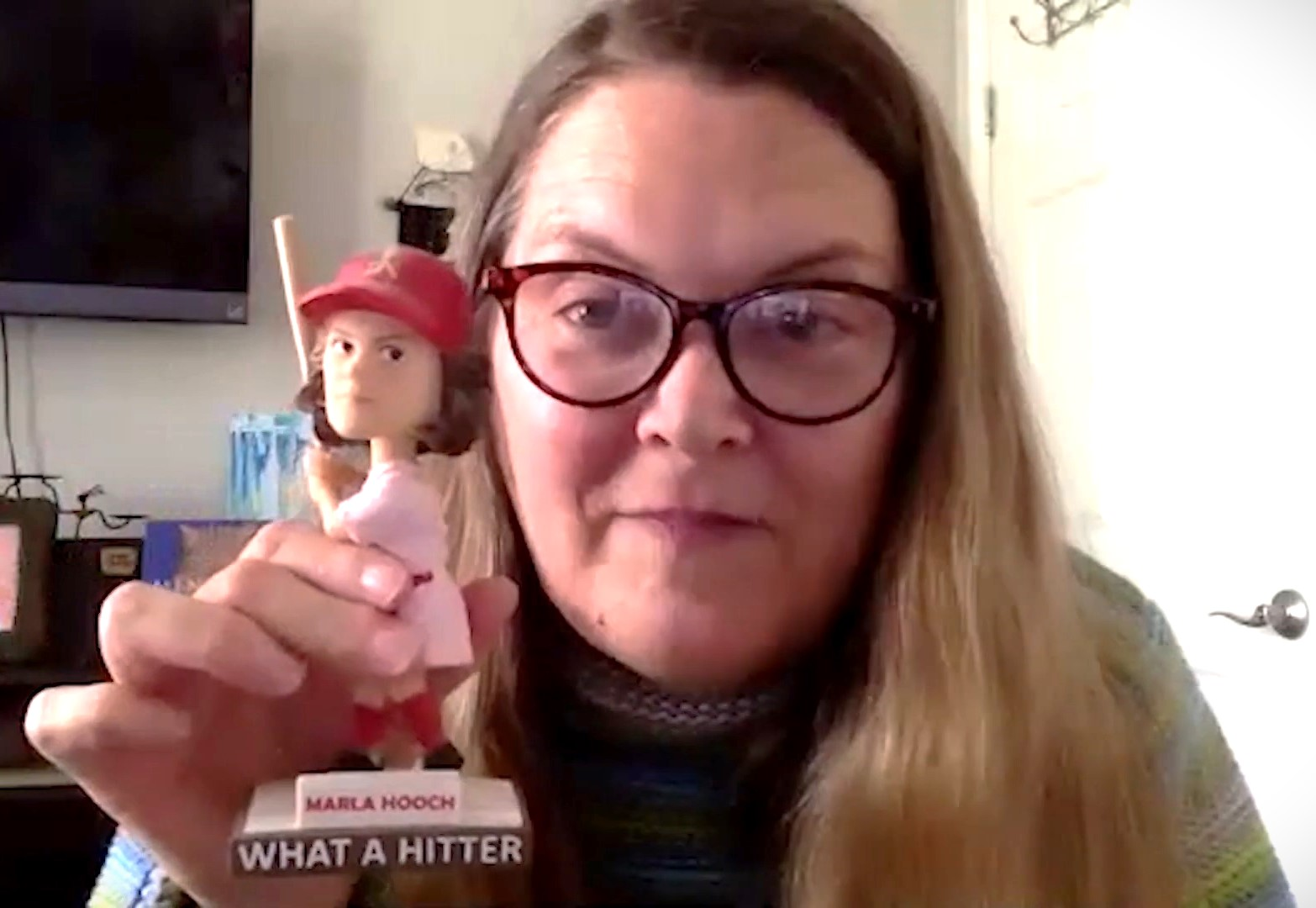
- Cavanagh with A League of Their Own bobblehead in 2021
- Born: 1960 (age 65–66); Chicago, Illinois, U.S.
- Occupation: Actress
- Years active: 1984–present

Megan Cavanagh (born 1960) is an American actress. She is known voicing Judy Neutron in the animated film Jimmy Neutron: Boy Genius (2001), and its television series The Adventures of Jimmy Neutron, Boy Genius.

== Early life and education ==
Cavanagh was born in 1960 in Chicago, the daughter of Jim and Rita. Raised in River Forest along with her four siblings, Cavanagh went to Oak Park and River Forest High School, graduating at 16 in 1977. She attended Rosary College in River Forest (now Dominican University), graduating in January 1982.

== Career ==
=== Film ===
Cavanagh made her film debut in Penny Marshall's A League of Their Own (1992), co-starring with Tom Hanks, Geena Davis, Madonna, Rosie O'Donnell and Lori Petty. Film critic Vincent Canby of The New York Times praised the film, writing: "A League of Their Own is one of the year's most cheerful, most relaxed, most easily enjoyable comedies. It's a serious film that's lighter than air, a very funny movie that manages to score a few points for feminism in passing." He went on to list Cavanagh as among "the excellent supporting players" of the movie, as did film critic Jonathan Rosenbaum of the Chicago Reader.

Following her silver screen debut, Cavanagh was cast in supporting roles in two Mel Brooks comedies, as Broomhilde in Robin Hood: Men in Tights (1993) and as Essie in Dracula: Dead and Loving It (1995). Other films include supporting roles in For Richer or Poorer (1997), starring Tim Allen, Kirstie Alley, and Jay O. Sanders, and Disney's That Darn Cat (1997) starring Christina Ricci and Doug E. Doug.

She voiced Judy Neutron and Sasha Vortex in the 2001 Oscar-nominated animated feature Jimmy Neutron: Boy Genius.

=== TV ===
Cavanagh was featured in the short-lived second season of Bob (1993), and appeared in the recurring role of Trudy McHale (from 1998 to 1999), who marries Al Borland in the series' finale of the sitcom Home Improvement (1991–99) starring Tim Allen, Patricia Richardson and Earl Hindman.

Openly lesbian, Cavanagh starred in Exes and Ohs (2007), a lesbian comedy on Logo TV.

She reprised the role of Judy Neutron in The Adventures of Jimmy Neutron, Boy Genius and several TV movies including The Jimmy Timmy Power Hour, Jimmy Neutron: Win, Lose and Kaboom, The Jimmy Timmy Power Hour 2: When Nerds Collide and The Jimmy Timmy Power Hour 3: The Jerkinators. She also voiced Slog in Tak and the Power of Juju and Hilary Higgenbottom in The Mighty B!.

She appears in one episode of the American sitcom Friends as Luisa, an animal control officer who was the ex-classmate of Rachel (Jennifer Aniston) and Monica (Courteney Cox).

Cavanagh makes an appearance in the fourth episode of the third season of Will & Grace ("Girl Trouble") as Terry.

=== Stage ===
Cavanagh returned to the stage in 2004 as Earth Mother in Menopause: The Musical.

In 2009, Cavanagh portrayed the medium Madame Arcati in High Spirits, a musical with book, lyrics, and music by Hugh Martin and Timothy Gray, based on the play Blithe Spirit by Noël Coward. 42nd Street Moon's production was staged at the Eureka Theater (215 Jackson St.) in San Francisco, which was well received. San Francisco theater critic Chad Jones wrote: "On Broadway, [Angela] Lansbury is said to be divine in the role, but 42nd Street Moon has a real secret weapon here: Megan Cavanagh...Cavanagh is hilarious and heartfelt."

=== Chicago ===
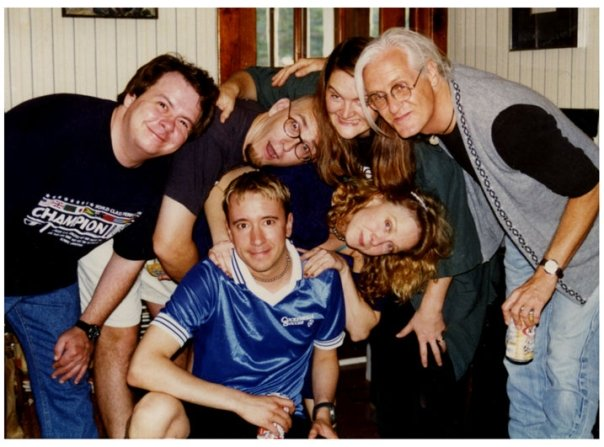
Cavanagh, at top center, pictured with the New Age Vaudeville theater group in 1995

Cavanagh was an original member (1984–1987) of the professional theatre troupe New Age Vaudeville (formerly the Comedy Cabaret) founded by Richard O'Donnell and Amy McKenzie. An Actor's Equity (AEA) theatre troupe, the Comedy Cabaret landed a summer residence at Peninsula Players in Fish Creek, Wisconsin, where it developed works for a predominantly tourist trade and then relocated to their winter home in Chicago at CrossCurrents. Throughout her tenure, Megan Cavanagh (who thus earned her Actors' Equity union card) starred in numerous productions including the cult-hits An Evening with Elmore & Gwendolyn Putts - The Neighbors Next Door and The TV Dinner Hour (the latter featured IO Theater founder Del Close). Rick Kogan of the Chicago Tribune hailed both productions as "Among the most polished and clever productions of the season, a pair of devilishly inventive and challenging shows that won over critics and audiences".

== Filmography ==
=== Film ===
Year	Title	Role	Director	Notes
1992	A League of Their Own	Marla Hooch	Penny Marshall	
1993	Robin Hood: Men in Tights	Broomhilde	Mel Brooks	
1994	Junior	Willow	Ivan Reitman	
1994	I Love Trouble	Mrs. Delores Beekman	Charles Shyer	
1995	Dracula: Dead and Loving It	Essie	Mel Brooks	
1995	Ripple	Gail	Jonathan Segal	Short
1997	That Darn Cat	Lu	Bob Spiers	
1997	For Richer or Poorer	Levinia Yoder	Bryan Spicer	
1998	Meet the Deedles	Mo	Steve Boyum	
1998	The Thin Pink Line	Mrs. Ledbetter	Joe Dietl & Michael Irpino	
1998	Ted	Girl Next Door	Gary Ellenberg	
1998	Runaway Rocketboy!	Judy Neutron/VOX (voices)	John A. Davis	Short
1999	A Walk in the Park	Nurse	Alan Berger	
2000	Thumbtanic	The Servant / Rich Woman / The Wife (voices)	Todd Portugal	Short
2001	Jimmy Neutron: Boy Genius	Judy Neutron/VOX (voices)	John A. Davis	
2001	Three Shots	Megan	Gene Wolande	Short
2002	Bug	Meter Maid	Phil Hay & Matt Manfredi	
2002	The Ten Rules	Chris One	Lee Friedlander	Short
2002	The Blair Thumb	Stressy	Todd Portugal	Short
2002	The Godthumb	Bea / Conceited / Old Italian Woman	David Bourla	Short
2003	Wasabi Tuna	Megan	Lee Friedlander	
2003	Give or Take an Inch	Virginia	Lee Friedlander	Short
2004	Raising Genius	Charlene Hobbs	Linda Voorhees & Bess Wiley	
2005	Miss Congeniality 2: Armed and Fabulous	Shirley	John Pasquin	
2005	Getting to Know You	Samantha	Liz Lachman	Short
2007	Big Stan	Parole Board	Rob Schneider	
2008	The Last Page	Crazy Jennifer	Kevin Acevedo	Short
2012	Scrooge & Marley	Ghost of Christmas Present	Richard Knight Jr. & Peter Neville	
2014	Girltrash: All Night Long	Officer Margie	Alexandra Kondracke	
2015	The Birthday	Masked Woman #2	Brenna Malloy	Short
2018	Freelancers Anonymous	June	Sonia Sebastián	
2019	Thumb Wars Episode IX: The Thighs of Skywalker	General Bunhead	Steve Oedekerk	
TBA	The Adventures of Pinocchio	Additional Voices	Viktor Lakisov	

=== Television ===
Year	Title	Role	Director	Notes
1992	Condition: Critical	Helene	Jerrold Freedman	TV movie
1993	Murder of Innocence	Bonnie Stevens	Tom McLoughlin	TV movie
1993	A League of Their Own	Marla Hooch	Ted Bessell, Tom Hanks	6 episodes
1993	Bob	Chris Szelinski	Michael Zinberg	8 episodes
1994	Tales from the Crypt	Sister Mary What's Her Name	Roland Mesa	Episode: "Operation Friendship"
1995	Friends	Luisa Gianetti	Peter Bonerz	Episode: "The One Where the Monkey Gets Away"
1995	Brotherly Love	Lotus	Terry Hughes	Episode: "The Comic Con"
1996	Roseanne	Party Guest	Gail Mancuso	Episode: "Becky Houser, M.D.
1996–97	The Real Adventures of Jonny Quest	Julia / Kelly (voices)	Davis Doi	6 episodes
1997	ER	Darlene	Richard Thorpe	Episode: "Obstruction of Justice"
1997	Life's Work	Officer Colleen McManus	Michael Lessac	Episode: "Ride Along"
1998	Maggie	Yoli	Michael Zinberg	Episode: "Just Shoot Him"
1998–99	Home Improvement	Trudy McHale	Andrew Tsao, Peter Bonerz	5 episodes
1999	Thumb Wars	Fighter Pilot #2 (voice)	Steve Oedekerk	TV Short
1999	Smart Guy	Coach Frayda	Joe Regalbuto	Episode: "I Was a Teenage Sports Wife"
2000	Will & Grace	Terry	James Burrows	Episode: "Girl Trouble"
2000	The Expendables	Prison Warden	Janet Meyers	TV movie
2000–01	Jimmy Neutron: Boy Genius shorts	Judy Neutron/VOX (voices)	John A. Davis	4 episodes
2002	The West Wing	Voting Shortcut	Lesli Linka Glatter	Episode: "Election Night"
2002	The Bold and the Beautiful	Caller #2	Michael Stich	1 episode
2002	Boston Public		Arlene Sanford	Episode: "Chapter Forty-Six"
2002–06	The Adventures of Jimmy Neutron, Boy Genius	Judy Neutron/VOX (voices)	John A. Davis, Keith Alcorn	43 episodes
2003	John Doe	Madeline	Bryan Spicer	Episode: "Family Man"
2003	Just Shoot Me!	Marjorie	Pamela Fryman	Episode: "My Fair Finchy"
2004	Win, Lose and Kaboom	Judy Neutron/Mrs. Vortex (voices)	Mike Gasaway	TV movie
2004–06	The Jimmy Timmy Power Hour	Judy Neutron (voice)	Butch Hartman	TV Mini-Series
2004	Attack of the Twonkies	Judy Neutron (voice)	Keith Alcorn	TV movie
2007–08	Tak and the Power of Juju	Slog (voice)	Jim Schumann, Heiko Von Drengenberg	6 episodes
2007–11	Exes and Ohs	Chris	Gary Harvey, James Genn	14 episodes
2008–11	The Mighty B!	Hilary Higgenbottom (voice)	Larry Leichliter, Erik Wiese	9 episodes
2009	Back at the Barnyard	Brunhilda (voice)	Todd Grimes & T.J. Sullivan	Episode: "Pig Amok/Sun Cow"
2013–14	Winx Club	Queen Luna (voice)	Iginio Straffi	6 episodes
2015	Harvard Court	Juliet	Alexis J. Estevez	Episode: "The Keys"
2019	Drunk History	Penny Marshall	Derek Waters	Episode: "Baseball"
2020	The Loud House	Stern Fan/Hockey Fan (voices)		Episode: "On Thin Ice/Room and Hoard"
2022	Cars on the Road	Mae Pillar-Durev / Bella Cadavre (voices)		2 episodes

=== Video games ===
Year	Title	Role	Director	Notes
2001	Jimmy Neutron: Boy Genius	Judy Neutron/VOX/Benny	Mark Bradshaw	
2002	Jimmy Neutron vs. Jimmy Negatron	Judy Neutron/VOX	Mark Bradshaw	
2004	EverQuest II	Feodra Iceslayer / Blacksmith Hegrenn / Gretta Steinbeard	James D. Mortellaro	
2004	The Adventures of Jimmy Neutron Boy Genius: Attack of the Twonkies	Judy Neutron		
2012	Hitman: Absolution	Additional voices	Tore Blystad & Peter Fleckenstein	
2013	Star Trek	Additional voices		
