= The TV Dinner Hour =

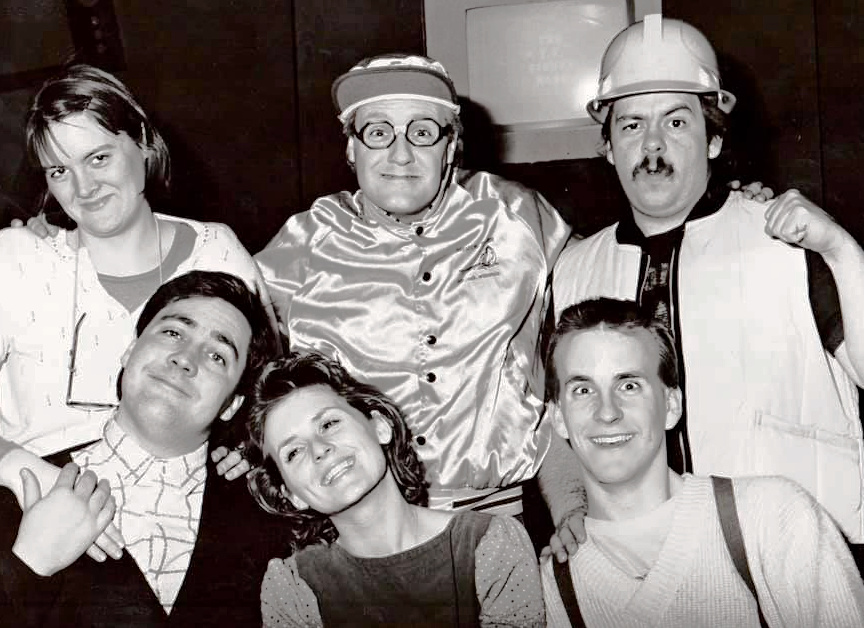
- (L-R) Megan Cavanagh, Michael Dempsey, Lisa Keefe, Richard O’Donnell, Todd Erickson, and Bobby McGuire
- Company: New Age Vaudeville
- Genre: Sketch Comedy; Musical Comedy; Improvisation; Slapstick
- Show type: Open-run
- Date of premiere: March 10, 1987
- Final show: June 13, 1987
- Location: Crosscurrents, Chicago; Comedy Cabaret, Wis.

Creative team
- Producers: McKenzie & O'Donnell
- Director: Amy McKenzie
- Book Music Lyrics: Richard O'Donnell
- Production Design Videographer: Peter Neville
- Guest Star: Del Close

Other information
- Years Active: 1983-87

The TV Dinner Hour is an American sketch comedy review written by Richard O’Donnell, directed by Amy McKenzie, and performed by the New Age Vaudeville theater company in Chicago.

== History ==
=== Glidden Lodge resort ===
The TV Dinner Hour, has a book, music, and lyrics by Richard O'Donnell. In the summer of 1986, it was originally produced and staged by Amy McKenzie, and featured the New Age Vaudeville comedy troupe at the Glidden Lodge resort in Baileys Harbor, Wisconsin.

=== Chicago, CrossCurrents ===
On March 10, 1987, It officially premiered at the CrossCurrents' cabaret theater, 3206 N. Wilton St., Chicago, Illinois.

The TV Dinner Hour was one of the cult hits of the Chicago comedy boom of the 1980s.

== Production ==
=== Principal creative team ===
The TV Dinner Hour was performed by the New Age Vaudeville Theater Co., members of Actor’s Equity Association (AEA). The set, props and videos were shot by NAV production designer Peter Neville, and produced by McKenzie and O'Donnell.

=== Kogan reviews ===
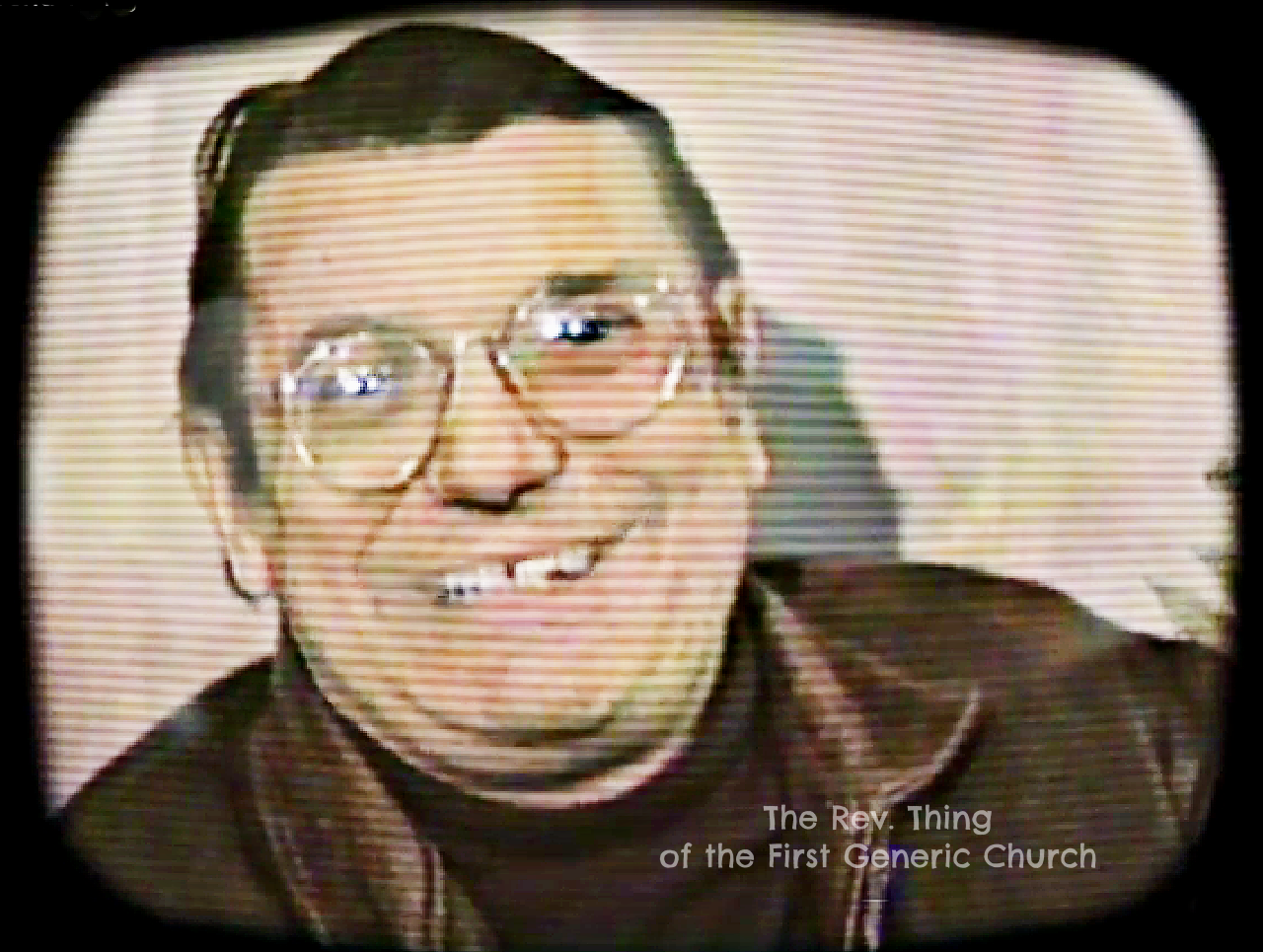
Del Close as the Rev. Thing in The TV Dinner Hour

The TV Dinner Hour had a successful run and was praised by Rick Kogan of the Chicago Tribune as "...a great show, uproariously funny and searingly intelligent." He went on to write that New Age Vaudeville's talent was in presenting "...such TV fare as game shows, rock videos, sitcoms, kiddie shows, religious programs, and horror movies [that were] transformed into fodder for devilish fun."

Kogan continued, stating, "Improv guru Del Close had a spectacular running routine as the Rev. Thing of the First Generic Church of What's-His-Name". He also hailed the production as "Marvelously written by Richard O`Donnell and snappily directed by Amy McKenzie," and praising the ensemble, writing, "The TV Dinner hour included bravura comic acting by Megan Cavanagh, Bobby McGuire, Todd Erickson, O`Donnell and newcomers to New Age Vaudeville, Michael Dempsey and Lisa Keefe."

In conclusion, Kogan surmised that both productions, An Evening with Elmore & Gwendolyn Putts and The TV Dinner Hour (running concurrently), were, "Among the most polished and clever productions of the season, a pair of devilishly inventive and challenging shows that won over critics and audiences."

== Cast ==
=== Wisconsin ===
(+denotes member of A.E.A.)

- Megan Cavanagh+
- Todd Erickson
- Dennis Kennedy+
- Amy McKenzie+
- Bobby McGuire
- Richard O’Donnell+

=== Chicago ===
(+denotes member of A.E.A.)

- Megan Cavanagh+
- Del Close+
- Michael Dempsey
- Todd Erickson
- Lisa Keefe
- Bobby McGuire
- Richard O’Donnell+
