= Westport Country Playhouse =

Theater in Westport, Connecticut, U.S.

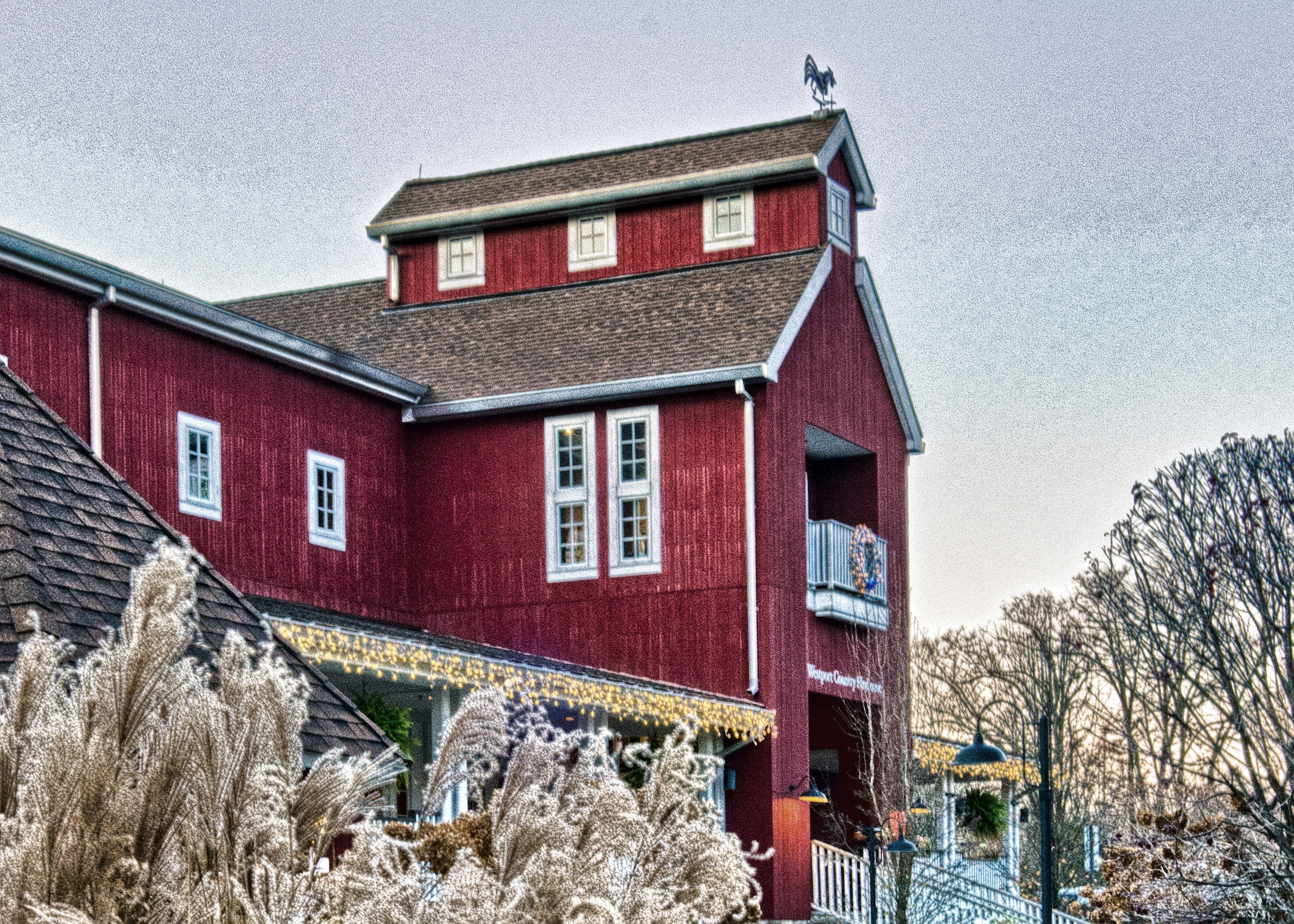
- Westport Country Playhouse
- Interactive map of Westport Country Playhouse
- Address: 25 Powers Court; Westport, Connecticut 06880; USA
- Coordinates: 41.1416°N 73.3548°W
- Capacity: 578
- Type: Regional theatre

Construction
- Opened: 29 June 1931
- Architect: Edwin Howard

Website
- www.westportplayhouse.org

Westport Country Playhouse is a not-for-profit regional theater in Westport, Connecticut.

It was founded in 1931 by Lawrence Langner, a New York theater producer. Langner remodeled an 1830s tannery with a Broadway-quality stage.

== History ==
=== Construction and early use ===
The building that now houses Westport Country Playhouse was originally constructed in 1835 as a tannery by R&H Haight, owned by Henry Haight. Charles H. Kemper acquired the tannery from Henry Haight's widow in 1866 and subsequently renamed the business C.H. Kemper Co.

In 1930, the former tannery, which had been unused since the 1920s, was purchased for $14,000 by Lawrence Langner. Cleon Throckmorten, a Broadway designer, was commissioned to renovate the interior of the building.

=== Grand opening ===
On June 29, 1931, the curtain went up on the first production at the Westport Country Playhouse. The Playhouse quickly became an established stop on the New England "straw hat circuit" of summer stock theaters.

=== Twentieth century ===
In the 1940s, the Westport Country Playhouse began its apprentice program for young theater professionals. Over the years, Westport Country Playhouse apprentices have included composer/lyricist Stephen Sondheim, screenwriter Frank Perry, television host Sally Jesse Raphael, composer Mary Rodgers, actor Cary Elwes, and actress Tammy Grimes. The educational apprenticeship programs are still running.

The Westport Country Playhouse closed due to World War II from 1942 to 1945. In the late 1940s and 1950s, the Westport Country Playhouse's successes included world premieres of William Inge's Come Back, Little Sheba and Horton Foote's The Trip to Bountiful, both of which went on to Broadway.

Since the Langners stepped down in 1959, the administration has included James B. McKenzie from 1959 to 2000, and actress Joanne Woodward, wife of actor Paul Newman, who served as artistic director from 2000 through 2005, following an 18-month, multi-million dollar renovation. Newman remained a part-owner of a restaurant next to the theatre until his death in 2008. The Playhouse became a non-profit in 1973.

=== Present day ===
The theater is under the artistic direction of Mark Shanahan.

Charity Navigator awarded its top 4-star charity rating to the Playhouse in recognition of its strong financial health and commitment to accountability and transparency.

== Building ==
=== Campaign for a New Era ===
The Campaign for a New Era was the fundraising effort by the Westport Country Playhouse to help pay for its $30.6 million, 18-month renovation from 2003 to 2005. Donations of more than $1,000 are recognized within the Westport Country Playhouse's lobby and production programs. Some of the largest donations came from the State of Connecticut, the Devlin Foundation, the Lucille Lortel Foundation, Elisabeth & Stanley Morten, and Joanne Woodward & Paul Newman.

Woodward and executive director Alison Harris led a $30.6 million renovation, transforming the old barn into a modern, year-round theatre facility. The renovated theatre reopened in 2005. At Woodward's suggestion, a piece of the original stage floor was placed at the dressing room entrance to give a little extra luck to the actors. Woodward stepped down from her job in January 2006, and was followed by actor, opera and theatre director, and playwright Tazewell Thompson serving through the 2007 season. Woodward and Newman continued to contribute to the Westport Country Playhouse's "Campaign for a New Era".

=== Seating ===
The Westport Country Playhouse currently has a total of 578 seats. This is the seating capacity before the renovation. The seats are now individual and cushioned, as opposed to the former wooden pews, while retaining the historic look of the former pews. Further, fewer of the current seats are considered "limited view" since the renovation.

The 578 seats are distributed as follows:

- 424 orchestra
  - 234 center orchestra
  - 93 house left orchestra
  - 97 house right orchestra
- 154 mezzanine
  - 118 center mezzanine
  - 18 left mezzanine boxes
  - 18 right mezzanine boxes

Several seats in both the orchestra and mezzanine can be removed or modified to be wheelchair accessible.

=== Stage ===
- Stage:
  - Height: 3 feet 2 inches (0.97 m) above house floor
  - Depth: 26 feet 2 inches (7.98 m) deep from plaster line to back wall, 2 feet 1 inch (0.64 m) apron below plaster line, 28 feet 3 inches (8.61 m) total depth
  - Wing Space: 13 feet 6 inches (4.11 m) clear stage right, 24 feet 6 inches (7.47 m) clear stage left
- Proscenium:
  - Height: 15 feet 3 inches (4.65 m) above stage floor
  - Width: 32 feet 9 inches (9.98 m) wide
- Orchestra pit:
  - Depth: 9 feet 3 inches (2.82 m) below stage floor

The Playhouse's fly gallery

== Education ==
Of the hundreds of interns and apprentices who have passed through the Playhouse's educational programs, several have gone on to attain notoriety. Some graduates include Stephen Sondheim, Frank Perry, Tammy Grimes, Sally Jessy Raphael, Mary Rodgers, and Christina Crawford. A large number of Playhouse interns and apprentices have made careers in the theatre or in related activities.

=== Joanne Woodward Internship Program ===
The program is named in honor of Joanne Woodward, co-artistic director. The Westport Country Playhouse provides summer and school year internships to students ages 19 and older from around the country.

The interns are entrusted with considerable responsibilities and treated as staff members while they engage in an intensive learning experience. Each intern is hired for a specific position, but are expected to work as a team and pitch in where necessary, including, but not limited to, running crew, ushering, concessions and parking.

Applicants must be serious minded, highly motivated and able to commit a minimum of twelve weeks, with long working hours as many as 7 days a week. Applicants should be college students, graduate students or recent graduates, with basic training and experience in theatre already completed, prepared to take the next step towards a professional theatre career.

The rehearsal room of the Playhouse

== Notable performers ==
Many notable performers have enhanced the Westport Country Playhouse stage from 1930 to the present, including such well-known names as Billie Burke, Liza Minnelli, Eartha Kitt, Gene Wilder, Paul Newman, James Earl Jones, Jane Curtin, Ruth Gordon, Kitty Carlisle, Henry Fonda, Hume Cronyn, Jessica Tandy, Olivia de Havilland, Eva Gabor, Johanna Day, Robert Sean Leonard, Michael Allinson, and Jane Fonda.

== Technical ==
=== Fly system ===
Prior to the 2003-2005 renovation, the "Old Barn" was still a "hemp house"- with steel pipe battens suspended from fiber ropes, counterweighted by canvas sandbags. The supporting grid in the fly loft was constructed of heavy wood timbers. Stagehands operated that fly system from a gallery located stage right, above the stage manager's podium.

The Westport Country Playhouse currently has a counterweight fly system currently employing 22 battens, with space for future installations. The height from the stage to the grid is 40 feet (12 m), with an effective fly range from 3 feet 10 inches (1.17 m) to 38 feet (12 m). Each arbor is 6 feet tall with a capacity for 1,200 pounds (540 kg). The locking rail is on the stage right wall, and the loading bridge is 32 feet 3 inches (9.83 m) above the stage floor.

Although the fly system and grid are designed for loads to be hung parallel to the proscenium, smaller loads can be hung perpendicular using cables independent of the actual arbor system. These have to be flown in and out manually from the grid, so perpendicularly hung loads are generally stationary during performances.

Some stage lighting instruments of the Playhouse

=== Lighting ===
Lighting is controlled from a Strand 520 console in a control booth at the back of the house. For technical rehearsals, a control position can be set up in the center of the theatre.

The Westport Country Playhouse's stage lighting instruments include:

- 2 – ETC Source Four 19° ERS
- 61 – ETC Source Four 26° ERS
- 58 – ETC Source Four 36° ERS
- 24 – ETC Source Four 50° ERS
- 18 – Altman 6 inch 500w Fresnels
- 7 – Altman 1 kW triple unit far cycs
- 42 – PAR 64
- 7 – T-6 six cell, three circuit, 4-foot 6 inches
- 6 – Birdies

Color scrollers, irises, top hats, and barn doors (all lighting instrument attachments) are also available. On-stage film and projection equipment are only available through special arrangement.
