= Studs (game show) =

American television game show

- Genre: Game show
- Developed by: Howard Schultz; Michael Metzger
- Presented by: Mark DeCarlo
- Country of origin: United States
- Original language: English
- No. of seasons: 3

Production
- Executive producer: Howard Schultz
- Producer: Laura Gelles
- Camera setup: Multi-camera
- Running time: 22–24 minutes
- Production companies: Fox Television Studios; FA Productions; 20th Television (1992–1993)

Original release
- Network: Syndication
- Release: March 11, 1991 – September 3, 1993

Studs is an American television game show that was produced by Fox Television Studios for syndication to local television stations. The series premiered on March 11, 1991, as a midseason series, did well enough in its run to be renewed for a full season, and aired for two more full seasons until September 3, 1993. The show was hosted by former game show contestant and comedian Mark DeCarlo, in one of his first TV hosting jobs.

The show follows a format similar to those of The Dating Game and Love Connection, although it provoked more controversy because the questions used relied more heavily on sexual innuendo and double entendre.

== Gameplay ==
Before each show, two men go on blind dates with the same three women. All five then appear on the show together, where the men answer questions about their dates and about the women in a succession of rounds. Correct guesses score them "stuffed hearts", and whoever has the most hearts at the end of the game is crowned "Ultimate Stud".

In the first round, on alternating turns, each man is shown three different statements from the women on a certain aspect about themselves (first impression, looks, romantic connection, etc.). The man chooses one statement and guesses which of the three women said it. If he answers correctly, he wins a stuffed heart to place somewhere on his person and is then given another guess from the remaining two statements; if incorrect, he gets nothing and his turn ends.

For the second round, the women were asked a series of questions prior to taping about the men (Example: "Which one is more likely to wear their beeper to bed?"); the men alternate guessing which man the women chose for each question; each correct guess scores another heart.

Near the end, each man reveals which of the women they want to go out with again, and where he would like to take her on their "dream date", after which each woman reveals their choice (as an added twist, the women also have the option of choosing neither man). If one man's choice and the woman's choice match, they get to go on their "dream date", with all expenses paid. If both men match their choices, the one with more stuffed hearts wins the date; in the rare event that both men have the same number of hearts and both their choices match, they are both declared winners.

=== Special episodes ===
The show occasionally features variations on the normal theme:

- In some episodes the genders were reversed, with two women dating the same three men; these episodes were alternatively titled "Studettes".
- Some men who did not win on earlier episodes were brought back for another chance, while others who became audience favorites, regardless of prior outcome, were also brought back.
- The show also taped some spring break episodes on-location at Universal Studios in Orlando, Florida.
- Jim Perry made a brief appearance at the beginning of one episode; Perry hosted Sale of the Century in 1985 when DeCarlo was a champion contestant.

== Reception ==
Although the show earned high ratings among younger viewers during its run, it was canceled to make room for The Chevy Chase Show, which lasted only five weeks.

== Notable contestants ==
- Ron Goldman appeared as a contestant in 1992, two years before he was murdered (along with Nicole Brown Simpson) in 1994.
- Three daughters of Illinois Republican congressman and presidential candidate Phil Crane appeared on the show in 1992.
- Tami Roman of The Real World: Los Angeles and Basketball Wives appeared as a contestant twice. Her second appearance occurred while The Real World was filming and the fourth episode of this season of The Real World showed her on her dates for and clips from her second appearance on Studs.
- Comedian Chris Hardwick appeared as a contestant in season 2, episode 31.

== Episode status ==
Some episodes of the series are currently available for streaming online on FAST and AVOD services Pluto TV and Tubi (both the game show and Tubi are owned by Fox Corporation).

== International broadcasts ==
British channel Sky One purchased Studs in 1992 and heavily promoted the show. However, Studs was unsuccessful in Britain; The Sunday Times reported Studs, along with Sky's other recent imports, Chances and E Street, "all did poorly with UK viewers".

The show was also screened in New Zealand, late weeknights on TV2 in the early 1990s. In Australia, it aired on Network 10.

== International version ==
An equally short-lived Spain version of the show title as Contacto con Tacto (Contact with Touch) hosted by Bertin Osbourne aired on Telecinco from 1992 until 1994.

== Merchandise ==
A board game was manufactured by TDC Games in 1992.
