= Thumb Wars =

1999 American Parody film

- Directed by: Steve Oedekerk
- Written by: Steve Oedekerk
- Produced by: Steve Oedekerk; Tom Koranda; Paul Marshal
- Starring: Steve Oedekerk; Ross Shafer; Mark DeCarlo; Rob Paulsen; Paul Greenberg; Andrea Fears; Megan Cavanagh
- Cinematography: Mike DePrez
- Edited by: Mike DePrez
- Music by: Robert Folk
- Production company: O Entertainment
- Distributed by: Icestorm Entertainment; Image Entertainment (United States, DVD); Revolver Entertainment (UK)
- Release dates: May 18, 1999; October 2, 2008 (DVD Re-release)
- Running time: 29 minutes
- Country: United States
- Language: English

Thumb Wars: The Phantom Cuticle is a 1999 short film directed by Steve Oedekerk. Using dressed up and coifed thumbs as puppets, Oedekerk created a parody of Star Wars, with characters like Loke Groundrunner, Princess Bunhead, Oobeedoob Benubi, Hand Duet, Crunchaka, Beeboobeep, Prissypeo, Black Helmet Man and Gabba the Butt. It is the first film in the Thumbs! series. Thumb Wars debuted on American television May 18, 1999, on UPN. It had its cable premiere on Cartoon Network on October 2, 2008 (and again on October 2, 2009) to promote the 2008 Clone Wars series that premiered the next day. The TV version provided a trimmed down version of the film. It was also re-released in 2002 alongside Thumbtanic as the Thumb Wars/Thumbtanic Thumb Double Feature on VHS and DVD. In 2005, the filmettes were again released together as a UMD Video on the PlayStation Portable system.

The film is produced by O Entertainment and was released on May 18, 1999.

The films stars voice actors Steve Oedekerk, Ross Shafer, Mark DeCarlo, Rob Paulsen, Paul Greenberg, Andrea Fears, and Megan Cavanagh. Steve Oedekerk, Mark DeCarlo, Rob Paulsen, and Megan Cavanagh also worked on the film Jimmy Neutron: Boy Genius, as well as the TV show that ran from 2002-2006 also done with O Entertainment.

== Storyline ==
The 29-minute film opens with a parody of Star Wars' "A long time ago..." phrase: "If there were thumbs in space and they got mad at each other there would be... THUMB WARS."

The film then cuts to rolling text flying into the distance, as in Star Wars: "It is a time of great unrest in the Universe. Using the nail side of the power of the Thumb, the Evil Thumbpire has taken a stronghold in the Sacul region of the Egroeg sector. The Thumbellion Resistance Fighters have retreated to a hidden base. The Thumbpire is constructing a big dangerous weapon thing with enough fire power to blow stuff up. If the Thumbellion can destroy the big dangerous weapon thing, they will live and the good side of the thumb will reign. If they don't there can be no sequels. No sequels means no merchandising, no fan clubs, no freaky guys at conventions that have way too much free time and no clear desire to date girls. Victory is imperative!"

Opening scenes depict Black Helmet Man capturing Princess Bunhead and killing Thumbellion soldiers. On the surface of the planet below, Loke Groundrunner whines to his aunt and uncle about wanting to be of use to someone. His uncle consoles him. "Well you're plenty useful here Loke. The harvest is soon and you'll be getting help! I bought a couple of digits today from the freaky little hooded creatures. The big one is sort of effeminate and annoying, and I think the little one has an amputee inside!" Loke runs off in a huff and meets up with the man with the silliest name in the galaxy: Oobedoob Scoobi-Doobi Benubi. At Oobedoob's place, they view a hologram of Princess Bunhead. She informs them that Black Helmet Man is building a "big, dangerous weapon thing" and that she needs their help. Loke and Oobedoob look up her holographic dress. After they viewed the message, they came back to Loke's house to find that his uncle Soondead and aunt Gonnabiteit have been 'clipped' by Black Helmet Man's troops. Loke determines to go and fight this evil menace.

At the Cantina, Loke and Oobedoob meet up with Crunchy and Hand Duet. Hand tells them, "A one armed man killed my wife Sabrina, a working girl. Now I'm a fugitive and in clear and present danger. I should be presumed innocent but they're playing patriot games with me. Raiders. Regarding Henry. Blade Runner. Air Force One..."

Loke and Oobedoob pay Hand and Crunchy in "girly giggles" at Hand's request, to save his skin from Gabba the Butt. The group boards Hand's ship Hand's Hand and set off to save Princess Bunhead and the galaxy. They are caught in a tractor beam outside of the Thumb Star which can spin planets. Once on the space station, Oobedoob and Black Helmet Man engage in a final duel, which Oobedoob is tricked into losing. Princess Bunhead appears and says, "I escaped somehow. Let's go." The team, minus Oobedoob, flee. However, Oobedoob's voice can be heard in Loke's head saying that he is still there "in spirit." Loke mentions that he considers this to be "kinda creepy".

The group hides in an asteroid where Loke meets Master Puppet. Master Puppet agrees to train Loke in the ways of The Thumb. After a training session, which Loke ends up failing miserably, Master Puppet (deeply humored by Loke's bumbling) dubs him a Thumb Master.

The group travels to the Thumbellion base to regroup for the final attack on the Thumb Star. They learn that there is a button on the station designed to blow the entire thing up, much to the confusion of Princess Bunhead. The Thumbellion fleet launches an attack on the station. This sets the stage for the final confrontation between Loke Groundrunner and Black Helmet Man atop Loke's Finger-wing fighter. It is then that Black Helmet Man reveals: "Loke, I am your... mother!" and throws his cape back to reveal a pink dress. Hand's Hand appears and knocks Black Helmet Man off into space. As he floats into space, Black Helmet Man calls out to Loke by yelling, "Just wait till your father gets home!"

When Loke proudly proclaims that he will use the Power of the Thumb to hit the destruct button, Oobedoob's voice is heard saying to use the ship's targeting system, as "that's what it's there for." Loke fires a missile which hits the button and the giant thumb is destroyed.

The last scene shows the cast at a Chili Cookoff, along with Master Puppet (visibly controlled by a puppeteer) and the ghost of Oobedoob. The film ends with a voiceover from Oobedoob: "The Thumb will be with you...always."

== Production ==
The production for Thumb Wars started in 1997 with Steve Oedekerk, Paul Marshal, Tom Koranda, Mark DeCarlo and Jim Jackman. In 1998, the production for Thumb Wars developed more seriously into filming. The production started filming in Los Angeles, California in the California suburbs.

== Running gags ==
Throughout the movie different characters will ask Loke to touch tongues. First to do so is Oobedoob, requiring the act to "seal the training's beginning" and "make it all official", followed by Master Puppet asking for the same in order to train Loke in the ways of the Thumb.

As a running gag between all of the Thumbs! featurettes, a one-eyed thumb appears in each one; in Thumb Wars, the one-eyed thumb is the bartender at the cantina.

== Releases ==
Thumb Wars was first released on VHS, and then again with additional features, including character bios, commentary, and a 'Gabba the Butt' interview, on DVD.

It is also available as part of the Thumb Wars/Thumbtanic Double Feature on DVD and UMD for the PlayStation Portable, released by O Entertainment and Image Entertainment. This disc features the two Thumbation filmettes Thumbtanic and Thumb Wars in that order. It also includes wraparound footage of The Thumbersons. Despite including the cast interviews from Thumbtanic and the Gabba the Butt interview and Character Bios from Thumb Wars, the film lacks the commentary available on the single-film releases.

== See also ==
- Thumbs!
