= James B. McKenzie =

American theater producer (1926–2002)

- Born: May 1, 1926; Appleton, Wisconsin
- Died: February 20, 2002 (aged 75); Norwalk, Connecticut
- Occupation: Producer
- Known for: Westport Country Playhouse; American Conservatory Theater; Peninsula Players
- Children: 4

James B. McKenzie (May 1, 1926, Appleton, Wisconsin – February 20, 2002) was an American theater producer best known for heading the Westport Country Playhouse, the American Conservatory Theater, and the Peninsula Players.

== Career ==
A native of Appleton, Wisconsin, McKenzie worked all over the United States as a stage manager, press agent, actor, stagehand, producer, and general manager. In the professional theatre, his career spanned more than half a century, during which he worked on over 2,000 productions. He was the producer or general manager of numerous regional theatres, including the famed Westport Country Playhouse in Westport, CT, Paper Mill Playhouse in Millburn, NJ, the American Conservatory Theater in San Francisco, CA, the Peninsula Players Theatre in Fish Creek, WI, Mineola (Long Island) Playhouse and the Royal Poinciana Playhouse in Palm Beach, FL. McKenzie produced over 60 national and international tours, including tours of Russia, Japan, and South America. In the early 1950s, he helped create over 100 original live television shows for NBC, and later produced seven television plays for PBS.

He also co-owned the Merrill-McKenzie advertising agency.

He received his BA from the University of Iowa and his MA from Columbia University. He served in the U.S. Navy in the Pacific during World War II.

== Broadway ==
For Broadway, McKenzie co-produced three original plays, including And Miss Reardon Drinks a Little starring Julie Harris and Estelle Parsons, which opened on Feb 25, 1971. The Girl in the Freudian Slip, written by William F. Brown and directed by Marc Daniels and starring Susan Brown, Bruce Hyde, and Marjorie Lord, opened May 18, 1967. In November 14, 1972, he co-produced The Secret Affairs of Mildred Wild starring Maureen Stapleton and Florence Stanley.

Written by Paul Zindel and directed by Melvin Bernhardt And Miss Reardon Drinks a Little received two Tony Award® nominations. Tony Award® Best Actress in a Play nomination went to Estelle Parsons for her portrayal of Catherine Reardon, and Rae Allen won the 1971 Tony Award® Best Featured Actress in a Play for her performance of Fleur Stein.

== American Conservatory Theater ==
McKenzie was ACT's chief administrator from 1969 to 1985, helping to steer the company through its precarious years under founder and general director William Ball. It was said that McKenzie's practical instincts and placid good nature formed an essential counterweight to Ball's mercurial temperament.

McKenzie's production of Hair at the Geary Theater in 1969 was credited with saving ACT from financial ruin. As a producer he elevated the company's financial state with a 15-month run of Godspell and imported productions of The Elephant Man, Don't Bother Me, I Can't Cope as well as mounting numerous other touring productions to San Francisco.

== Westport Country Playhouse ==
In 1930, the playhouse was founded by American theater legend Lawrence Langner and his wife, Armina Marshall. They purchased a 100-year-old cow barn in an apple orchard in Westport. They commissioned designer Cleon Throckmorton to transform the barn's interior into a theatre. In 1931, the first production at the Westport Country Playhouse was presented. Over its history, more than 700 plays have been produced, and almost four million people have attended. Performers included Helen Hayes, Henry Fonda, Ethel Barrymore, Tyrone Power, Jessica Tandy, Gene Kelly, and Tallulah Bankhead. More than 75 original works premiered at the theater and were produced on Broadway.

McKenzie was Executive Producer for the Westport Country Playhouse for 41 years, beginning in 1959. He resigned on January 1, 2000, to focus on commercial theatre, and continued as executive producer of the Peninsula Players Theatre Foundation in Wisconsin and the presidency of CORST (Council of Summer Resident Theatres).

== Peninsula Players ==
In 1946, a canvas tent was erected over the audience to shelter them from the weather, and in 1957, a pavilion with open canvas sides was built as a permanent structure. In 1960, the theater was sold at public auction and purchased by Kenneth Carroad. Long-time “Player”, James B. McKenzie, was hired to oversee business operations as producer. McKenzie went on to form the Peninsula Players Theatre Foundation, Inc., a non-profit organization created to operate the theater. In 1978, Carroad sold the property to McKenzie, who maintained ownership until 1993, when the Peninsula Players Theatre Foundation purchased the theater. McKenzie remained executive producer until he died in 2001

== Organizations ==
McKenzie was an active member of the League of American Theatres and Producers, vice president of the Council of Stock Theaters, president of the Council of Resident Summer Theaters, executive producer of the Connecticut Theater Foundation, a trustee of the Actors' Equity Association Pension and Health Fund, a member of the Association of Theatrical Press Agents and Managers, the Actors' Equity Association and the International Alliance of Theatrical Stage Employees.

== Death ==
James B. McKenzie died on Feb. 20, 2002, in Norwalk, Connecticut, after a battle with cancer and pneumonia. He was 75.

== Awards and honors ==
McKenzie was the recipient of the St. Mary Alumni Achievement Award, the Conservator of American Arts Award, the Connecticut Critics Circle Award for Outstanding Contribution to Theatre, and was presented with a Lifetime Achievement Award by the Town of Westport in 1998.

The American Conservatory Theater, which Mr. McKenzie led from 1962 to 1982, was awarded the Tony Award® for best regional theater in 1979.

== Personal ==
He is the father of David McKenzie, Kevin McKenzie, Amy McKenzie, and Agatha Barrows Kerr.
