= Tom Purcell =

American television writer and producer

- Occupations: Writer, Producer
- Years active: 1986–present
- Notable work: The Colbert Report and The Late Show with Stephen Colbert

Tom Purcell is an American television writer and producer who is notable for his work with Stephen Colbert on The Colbert Report and The Late Show with Stephen Colbert. He is the winner of seven Primetime Emmy Awards.

== Early life and education ==
Tom Purcell grew up in St. Joseph, Michigan, just north of South Bend, Indiana, and graduated from St. Joseph High School. While attending St. Josephs', he started writing comedy at 15 years old, having his own comedy column and serving as features editor for his high school comedy newspaper called The Wind Up.

In 1985, Purcell graduated with a Bachelor of Arts from Loyola University in Chicago.

After college, Purcell took a job at Loyola's law library to pay the bills while working on his comedy routine and attending improvisation classes at The Second City in Chicago.

In the summer of 1987, Purcell wrote and performed with the resident theatre company New Age Vaudeville.

== Career ==
From 1997 to 2000, while living in Los Angeles, Purcell served as story editor and writer for the Cosby TV series. He went on to write for such television shows as Grounded for Life, Run of the House, and The Daily Show.

In 2005, Purcell relocated to New York City, being hired as a writer for The Colbert Report on Comedy Central and then in 2015 followed his boss to CBS's The Late Show with Stephen Colbert.

Purcell most recently served as an executive producer of The Late Show, where he oversees the show's writers and helps write and polish Colbert's material. Purcell has said that he often relies on his Catholic, Jesuit education from Loyola University while working for Colbert, who is known for using Catholic humor.

As of 2021, he is the winner of 7 Primetime Emmy awards.

== Awards ==
- 2013 Emmy, Nominee, Writing for a variety series (Colbert Report)
- 2014 Emmy, Winner, Writing for a variety series (Colbert Report)
- 2015 Writers Guild of America, Nominee, Comedy/variety (including talk) -- series:(Colbert Report)
- 2015 Producers Guild of America, Nominee, Outstanding Producer of Live Entertainment & Talk Television (The Colbert Report)
