= Thumbs! =

Series of short parody films developed by Steve Oedekerk

Thumbs! is a collective term for the O Entertainment short films created by Steve Oedekerk using "Thumbation" technology, a process which combines live-action thumbs and superimposition of the voice actors' faces. The first short, Thumb Wars, was created as a television special and spawned the rest of the series.

Each featurette is available on DVD, with exclusive extra footage on the Thumb Wars/Thumbtanic Thumb Double Feature. The entire series is available in a box set called All Thumbs, which does not include the Double Feature or The Thumbersons short.

Half of the shorts have aired on Cartoon Network, before the show or film being parodied air, such as Thumb Wars (for Star Wars: The Clone Wars) and Bat Thumb (for airings of Batman & Robin). Frankenthumb aired around Halloween 2008.

== Filmettes ==

- Thumb Wars: The Phantom Cuticle (1999) (parody adaptation of Star Wars)
- The Godthumb (2001) (parody adaptation of The Godfather)
- Bat Thumb (2001) (parody adaptation of the Batman movie series)
- Frankenthumb (2002) (parody adaptation of Frankenstein)
- The Blair Thumb (2002) (parody adaptation of The Blair Witch Project)
- Thumbtanic (2002) (parody adaptation of Titanic)
- Thumb Debate '08! is a six-minute parody of the presidential debates between Barack Obama and John McCain during the 2008 presidential election.
- Thumb Wars: The Thighs of Skyskipper is a spoof of Star Wars: The Rise of Skywalker and a sequel to Thumb Wars: The Phantom Cuticle. Initially planned to be released on May 4th 2023, its release has been pushed back due to a new partnership with a "Major Studio". It serves as Oedekerk's first project following his hiatus due to the failure and poor reception of Planet Sheen.

== Shorts ==
- The Thumbersons, a small short, came with the Thumb Wars/Thumbtanic Thumb Double Feature.

== Collections ==
- "Thumb Wars/ Thumbtanic Thumb Double Feature" is the only double feature of Thumbs! available. It includes "Thumb Wars" and "Thumbtanic". It also comes with the exclusive short "The Thumbersons". In 2005, it was released for the PlayStation Portable's UMD Video.
- "All Thumbs!" is a boxed set containing "Thumb Wars", "Thumbtanic", "The Godthumb", "Bat Thumb", "Frankenthumb", and "Blair Thumb" on DVD. The short "The Thumbersons" was omitted. This is because the "Thumb Wars/ Thumbtanic Thumb Double Feature" wasn't included, rather two separate DVDs for the two filmettes.
